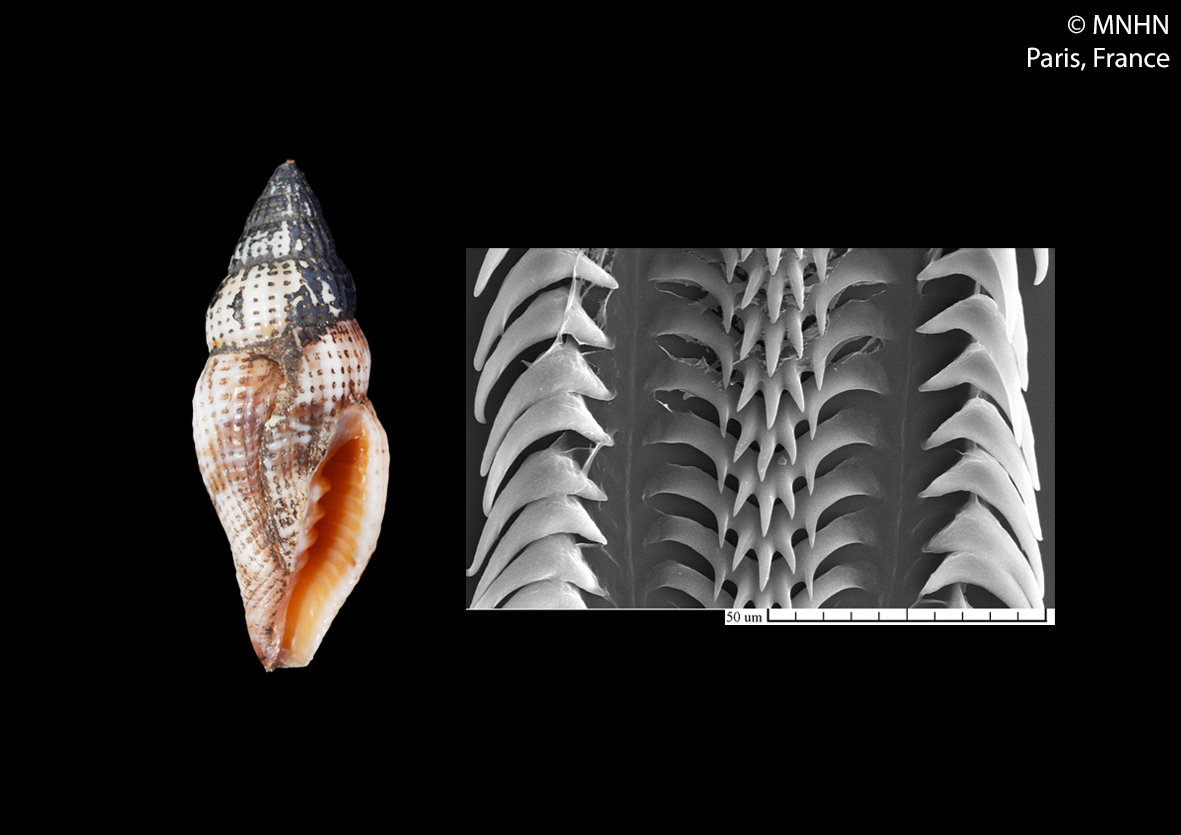
- Shell of Nodicostellaria laterculata

Scientific classification
- Kingdom: Animalia
- Phylum: Mollusca
- Class: Gastropoda
- Subclass: Caenogastropoda
- Order: Neogastropoda
- Superfamily: Turbinelloidea
- Family: Costellariidae
- Genus: Nodicostellaria; Petuch, 1987

Type species
- Costellaria kaicherae Petuch, 1979

Synonyms
- Vexillum (Nodicostellaria) Petuch, 1987

= Nodicostellaria =

Genus of gastropods

Nodicostellaria is a genus of sea snails, marine gastropod mollusks, in the family Costellariidae, the ribbed miters.

== Species ==
Species within the genus Nodicostellaria include:

- † Nodicostellaria jonesae Petuch, 1991
- Nodicostellaria kaicherae (Petuch, 1979)
- Nodicostellaria laterculata (G. B. Sowerby II, 1874)

Synonyms

- Nodicostellaria crassa (Simone, 1995): synonym of Bathythala crassa (Simone, 1995)
- Nodicostellaria kremerae Petuch, 1987: synonym of Bathythala kremerae (Petuch, 1987)
- Nodicostellaria lixa (Petuch, 1979): synonym of Nodicostellaria kaicherae (Petuch, 1979) (junior subjective synonym)
