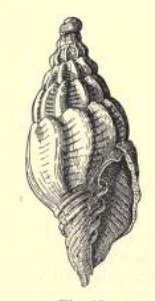
- Drawing of shell of Vexillum pilsbryi (holotype)

Scientific classification
- Kingdom: Animalia
- Phylum: Mollusca
- Class: Gastropoda
- Subclass: Caenogastropoda
- Order: Neogastropoda
- Superfamily: Turbinelloidea
- Family: Costellariidae
- Genus: Vexillum
- Species: V. pilsbryi

Binomial name
- Vexillum pilsbryi (Hedley, 1899)

Synonyms
- Turricula pilsbryi Hedley, 1899 (original combination); Vexillum (Pusia) pilsbryi (Hedley, 1899) ·

= Vexillum pilsbryi =

Species of gastropod

Vexillum pilsbryi is a species of small sea snail, marine gastropod mollusk in the family Costellariidae, the ribbed miters.

The Australian Faunal Directory considers this species as a synonym of Vexillum rubrum, itself a synonym of Atlantilux rubra (Broderip, 1836).

== Description ==
The length of the shell attains 6 mm, its diameter 2 mm.

(Original description) The shell has a fusiform shape. Its colour is orange-buff, with a rosy apex. The shell contains five whorls, plus the protoconch.

Sculpture: on the body whorl are six roundly swelling arcuate ribs, which arise at the suture and terminate at the basal constriction, but disappear on the final half whorl. The anti- penultimate whorl has thirteen ribs. On ascending the spire, the ribs become comparatively more prominent, and on the earliest whorl are sharply constricted and angled at their upper third. On each whorl they alternate with those above and below. Between the ribs appear delicate and evenly-spaced, spiral grooves. Seven or eight broad, close, flat-topped lyrae are obliquely wound around the base. The protoconch is two-whorled, globose, projecting on the right side, smooth. Anteriorly a spiral groove forecasts the constriction of a later whorl. In the unique specimen the outer lip is broken. The columella bears a tubercle at the posterior angle, it is then excavated. The moderately straight columella carries four, con spicuous, projecting plaits. A callus is spread over the preceding whorl. The throat is on its outer wall corrugated by a dozen raised spiral lines.

== Distribution ==
This marine species occurs off Tuvalu (on the western slope of Funafuti Atoll).
