= Atlantilux =

Scientific classification
- Kingdom: Animalia
- Phylum: Mollusca
- Class: Gastropoda
- Subclass: Caenogastropoda
- Order: Neogastropoda
- Superfamily: Turbinelloidea
- Family: Costellariidae
- Genus: Atlantilux; Huang, 2015

Type species
- Mitra exigua C. B. Adams, 1845

Genus of sea snails

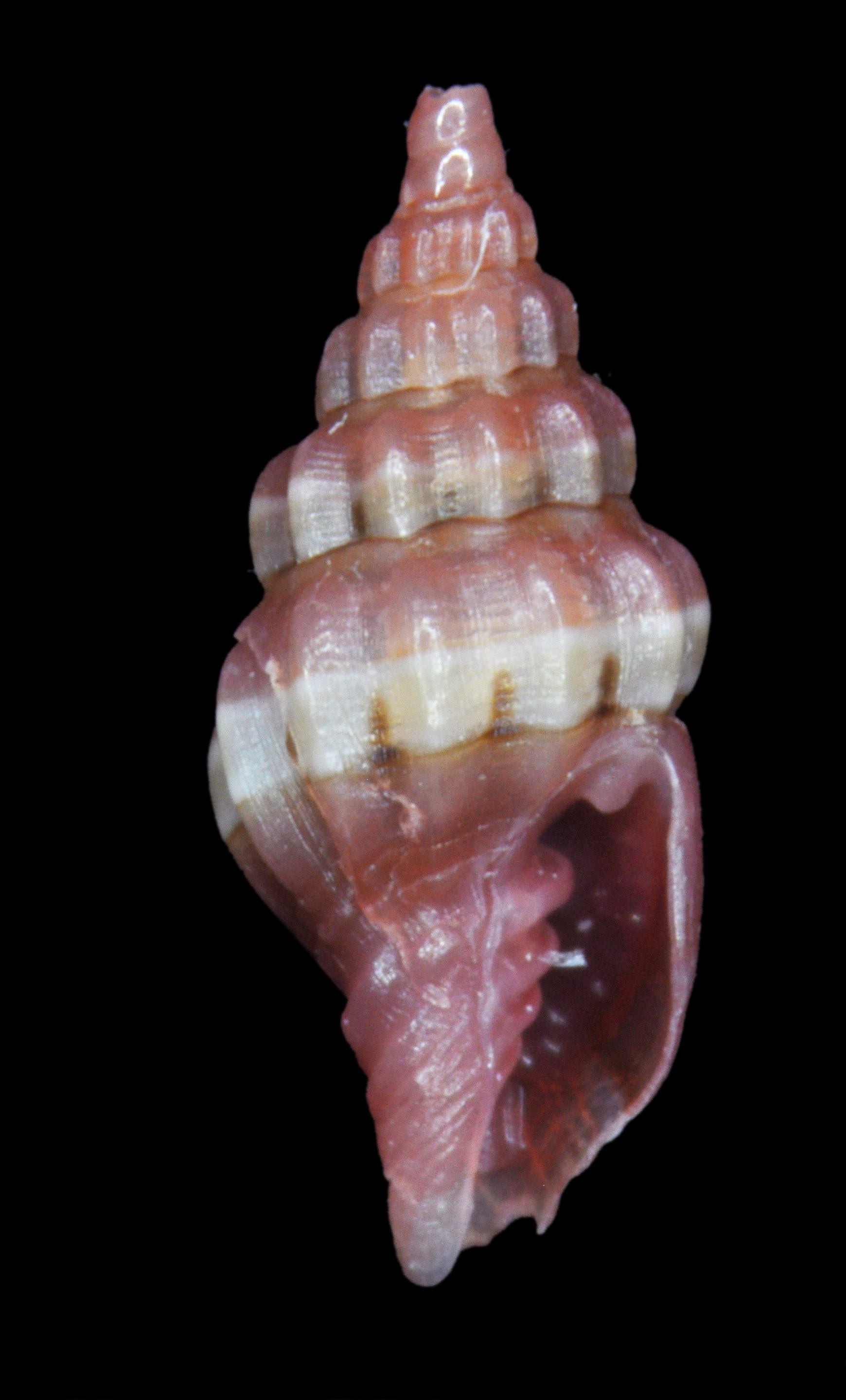
Atlantilux rubra

Atlantilux is a genus of sea snails, marine gastropod mollusks, in the family Costellariidae, the ribbed miters.

== Species ==
Species within the genus Atlantilux include:

- Atlantilux ampla Huang, 2015
- Atlantilux gemmata (G. B. Sowerby II, 1874)
- Atlantilux hanleyi (Dohrn, 1861)
- Atlantilux narcisselli Huang, 2015
- Atlantilux puella (Reeve, 1845)
- Atlantilux sykesi (Melvill, 1925)

Synonyms

- Atlantilux exigua (C. B. Adams, 1845): synonym of Pusia exigua (C. B. Adams, 1845)
- Atlantilux nodospicula (Cernohorsky, 1970): synonym of Pilgrivexillum nodospiculum (Cernohorsky, 1970) (superseded combination)
- Atlantilux rubra (Broderip, 1836): synonym of Pacifilux rubra (Broderip, 1836) (superseded combination)
