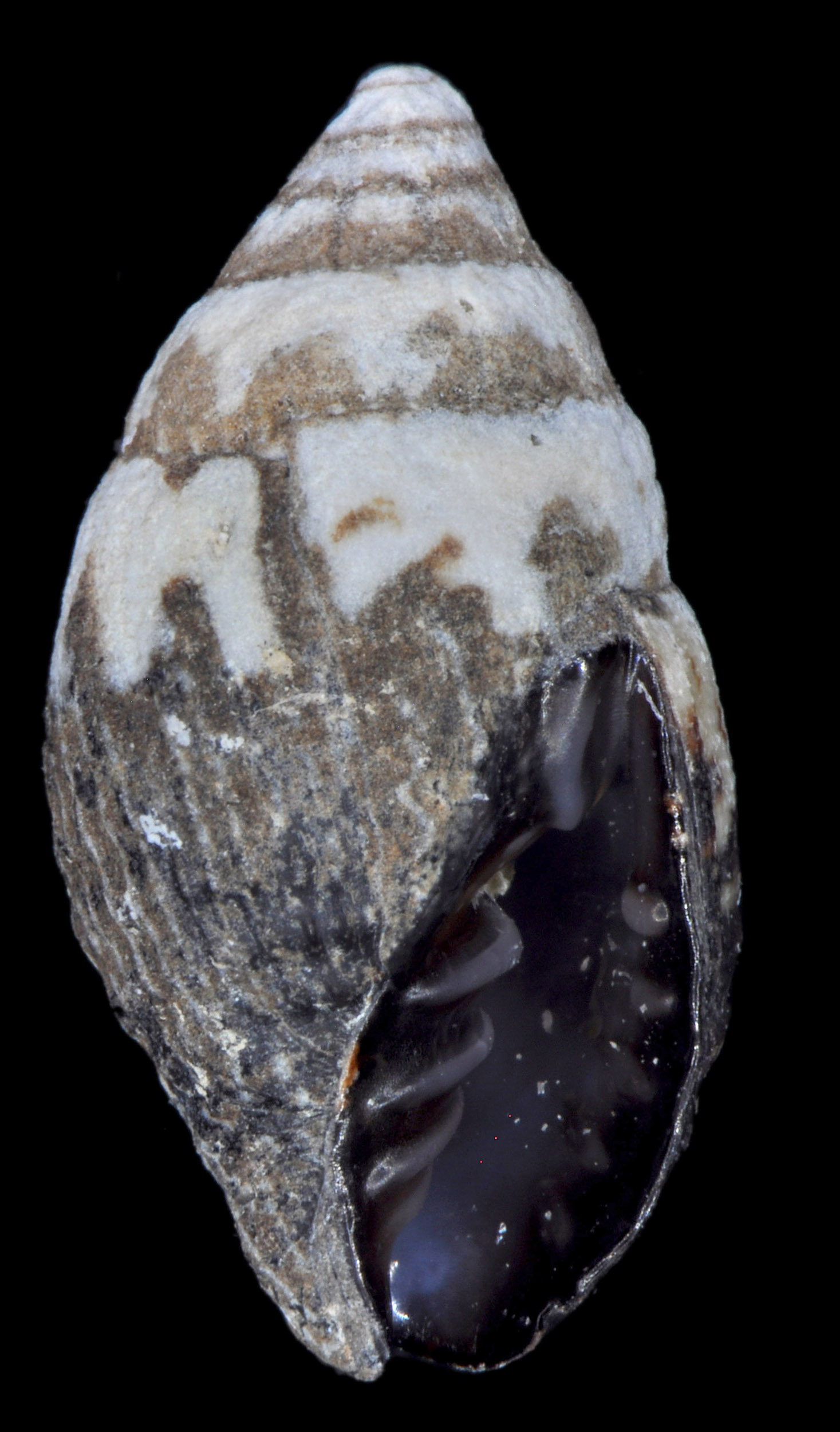
- Shell of Atlantilux puella (specimen at MNHN, Paris)

Scientific classification
- Kingdom: Animalia
- Phylum: Mollusca
- Class: Gastropoda
- Subclass: Caenogastropoda
- Order: Neogastropoda
- Superfamily: Turbinelloidea
- Family: Costellariidae
- Genus: Atlantilux
- Species: A. puella

Binomial name
- Atlantilux puella (Reeve, 1845)

Synonyms
- Mitra albomaculata G. B. Sowerby II, 1874; Mitra puella Reeve, 1845; Vexillum (Pusia) puella (Reeve, 1845); Vexillum puella (Reeve, 1845)

= Atlantilux puella =

Species of gastropod

Atlantilux puella is a species of sea snail, a marine gastropod mollusk, in the family Costellariidae, the ribbed miters.
