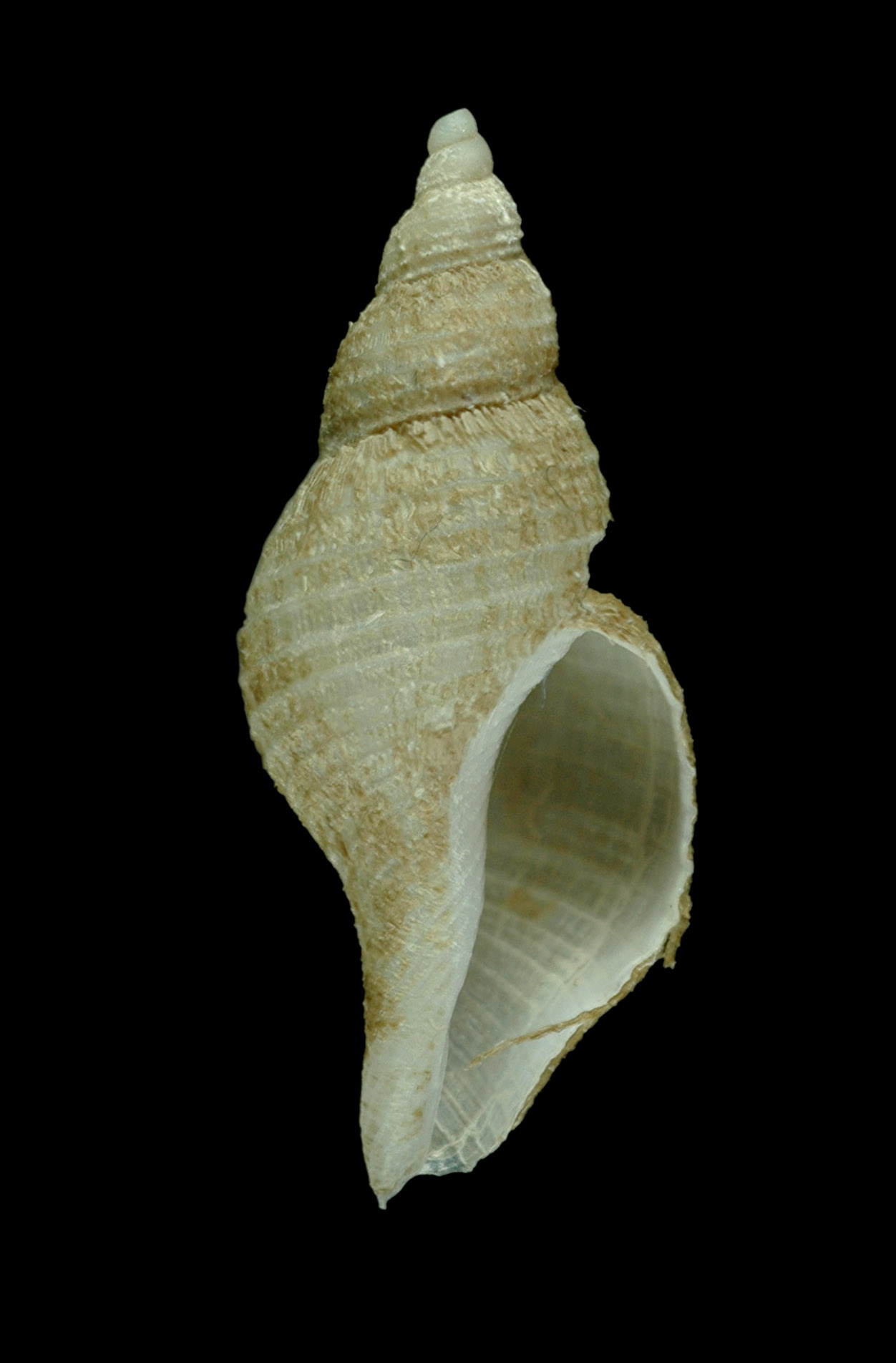
- Shell of Ceratoxancus elongatus (specimen at MNHN, Paris)

Scientific classification
- Kingdom: Animalia
- Phylum: Mollusca
- Class: Gastropoda
- Subclass: Caenogastropoda
- Order: Neogastropoda
- Family: Costellariidae
- Genus: Ceratoxancus
- Species: C. elongatus

Binomial name
- Ceratoxancus elongatus Sakurai, 1958

= Ceratoxancus elongatus =

Species of gastropod

Ceratoxancus elongatus is a species of sea snail, a marine gastropod mollusk in the family Costellariidae.

== Distribution ==
This marine species occurs off Antarctica.
