= Ceratoxancus teramachii =

Scientific classification
- Kingdom: Animalia
- Phylum: Mollusca
- Class: Gastropoda
- Subclass: Caenogastropoda
- Order: Neogastropoda
- Family: Costellariidae
- Genus: Ceratoxancus
- Species: C. teramachii

Binomial name
- Ceratoxancus teramachii Kuroda, 1952

Species of gastropod

Ceratoxancus teramachii is a species of sea snail, a marine gastropod mollusk in the family Costellariidae.
