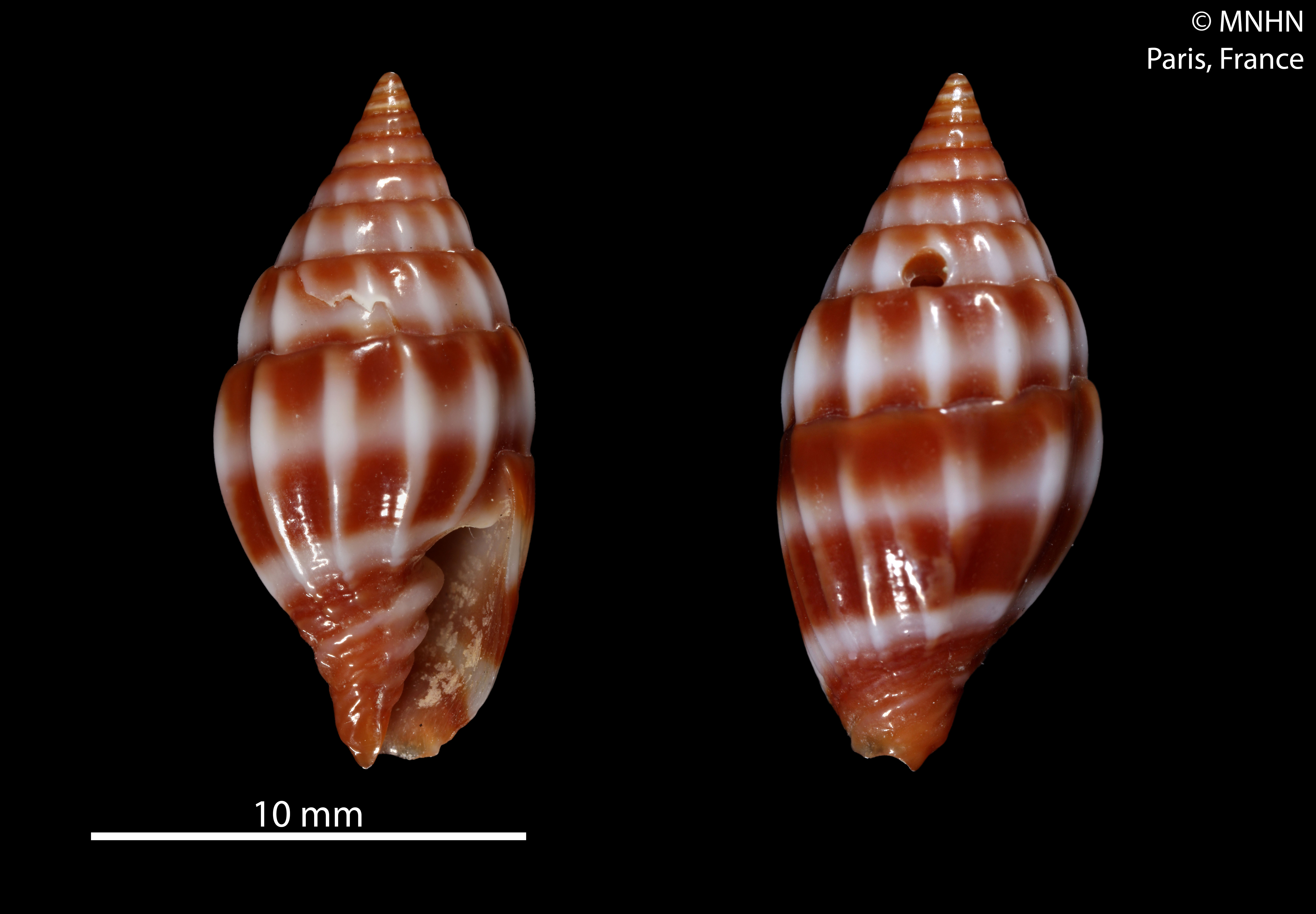
- Shell of Protoelongata thorssoni (paratype at MNHN, Paris)

Scientific classification
- Kingdom: Animalia
- Phylum: Mollusca
- Class: Gastropoda
- Subclass: Caenogastropoda
- Order: Neogastropoda
- Superfamily: Turbinelloidea
- Family: Costellariidae
- Genus: Protoelongata
- Species: P. thorssoni

Binomial name
- Protoelongata thorssoni (Poppe, Guillot de Suduiraut & Tagaro, 2006)

Synonyms
- Pusia thorssoni G.T. Poppe, E.G. Guillot de Suduiraut & S.P. Tagaro, 2006; Vexillum (Pusia) thorssoni Poppe, E. Guillot de Suduiraut & Tagaro, 2006 ·; Vexillum thorssoni Poppe, E. Guillot de Suduiraut & Tagaro, 2006

= Protoelongata thorssoni =

Species of gastropod

Protoelongata thorssoni is a species of small sea snail, marine gastropod mollusk in the family Costellariidae, the ribbed miters.

== Description ==
The length of the shell attains 14.3 mm.

== Distribution ==
This marine species occurs off the Philippines.
