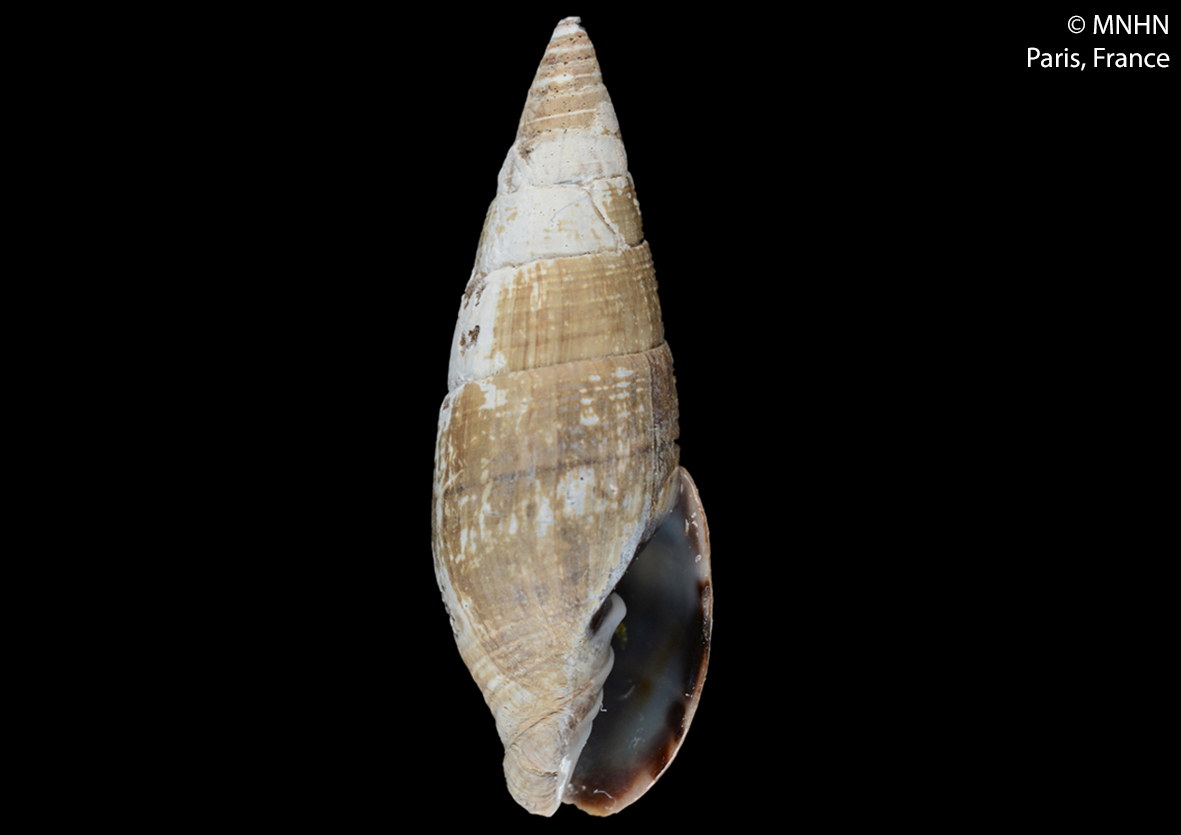
- Shell of Turriplicifer australis (specimen at MNHN, Paris)

Scientific classification
- Kingdom: Animalia
- Phylum: Mollusca
- Class: Gastropoda
- Subclass: Caenogastropoda
- Order: Neogastropoda
- Superfamily: Turbinelloidea
- Family: Costellariidae
- Genus: Turriplicifer
- Species: T. australis

Binomial name
- Turriplicifer australis (Swainson, 1820)

Synonyms
- Mitra australis Swainson, 1820; Mitra vincentiana Verco, 1896 junior homonym (not Cossmann, 1881); Vexillum (Pusia) australe (Swainson, 1820); Vexillum (Pusia) australe (Swainson, 1820)

= Turriplicifer australis =

Species of gastropod

Turriplicifer australis is a species of sea snail, a marine gastropod mollusk, in the family Costellariidae, the ribbed miters.

== Description ==
The length of the shell attains 37.7 mm.

The smooth shell is polished. It is brown, with a broad yellowish band stained with chestnut.

The shell is turreted, with dark brown bands and cinnamon-spotted white bands.

== Distribution ==
This marine species is endemic to Australia: South Australia, Tasmania, Victoria, Western Australia.
