= Protoelongata rubrotaeniata =

Scientific classification
- Kingdom: Animalia
- Phylum: Mollusca
- Class: Gastropoda
- Subclass: Caenogastropoda
- Order: Neogastropoda
- Superfamily: Turbinelloidea
- Family: Costellariidae
- Genus: Protoelongata
- Species: P. rubrotaeniata

Binomial name
- Protoelongata rubrotaeniata (Herrmann, Stossier & Salisbury, 2014)

Synonyms
- Vexillum (Protoelongata) rubrotaeniatum Herrmann, Stossier & Salisbury, 2014; Vexillum rubrotaeniatum Herrmann, Stossier & Salisbury, 2014

Species of gastropod

Protoelongata rubrotaeniata is a species of sea snail, a marine gastropod mollusk, in the family Costellariidae, the ribbed miters.
