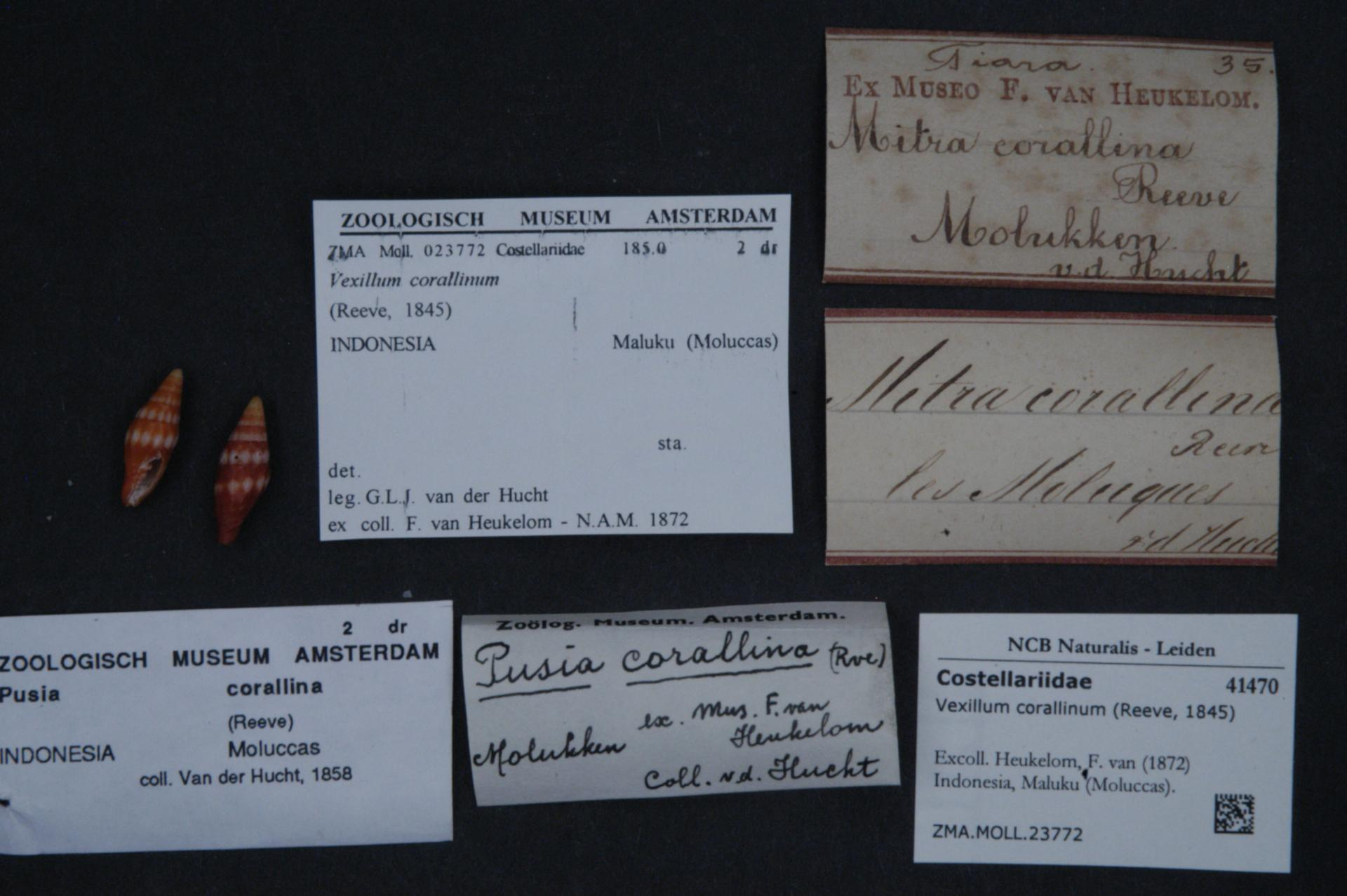
- Shell of Vexillum corallinum (specimen at Naturalis Biodiversity Center)

Scientific classification
- Kingdom: Animalia
- Phylum: Mollusca
- Class: Gastropoda
- Subclass: Caenogastropoda
- Order: Neogastropoda
- Superfamily: Turbinelloidea
- Family: Costellariidae
- Genus: Protoelongata
- Species: P. corallina

Binomial name
- Protoelongata corallina (Reeve, 1845)

Synonyms
- Mitra corallina Reeve, 1845; Pusia corallina (Reeve, 1845); Vexillum (Protoelongata) corallinum (Reeve, 1845); Vexillum (Pusia) corallinum (Reeve, 1845); Vexillum corallinum (Reeve, 1845)

= Protoelongata corallina =

Species of gastropod

Protoelongata corallina, common name the coral mitre, is a species of sea snail, a marine gastropod mollusk, in the family Costellariidae, the ribbed miters.

== Description ==
(Original description) The shell is somewhat fusiform, polished and a little recurved at the base. The whorls are transversely obsoletely striated and longitudinally plicately ribbed. Its colour is amber or coral red, the ribs whitish. The columella is four-plaited.

== Distribution ==
This marine species occurs off the Philippines.
