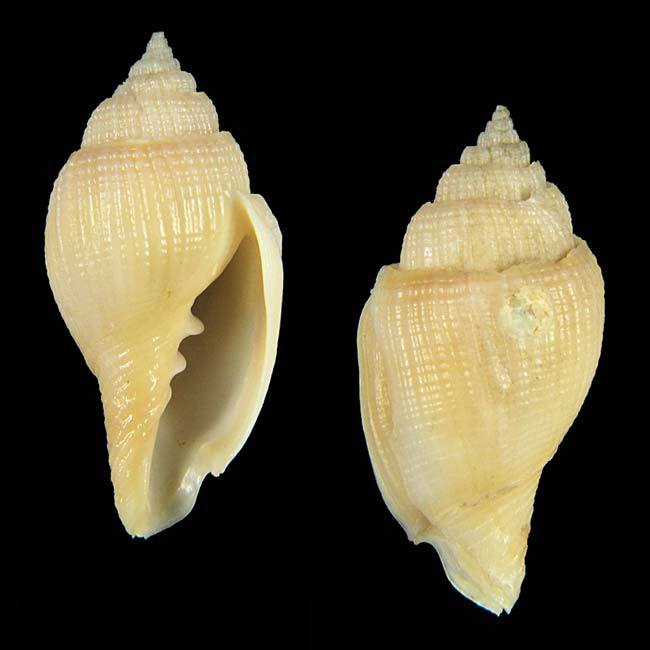

Scientific classification
- Kingdom: Animalia
- Phylum: Mollusca
- Class: Gastropoda
- Subclass: Caenogastropoda
- Order: Neogastropoda
- Family: Costellariidae
- Genus: Ceratoxancus
- Species: C. lorenzi

Binomial name
- Ceratoxancus lorenzi Poppe, Tagaro & Sarino, 2012

= Ceratoxancus lorenzi =

Species of gastropod

Ceratoxancus lorenzi is a species of sea snail, a marine gastropod mollusk in the family Costellariidae.

== Distribution ==
This marine species occurs off the Philippines.

== Original description ==
- Poppe G.T., Tagaro S.P. & Sarino J.C. (2012) A new Ceratoxancus (Gastropoda: Ptychatractidae), from the Philippines. Visaya 3(5): 29-32. [March 2012].
