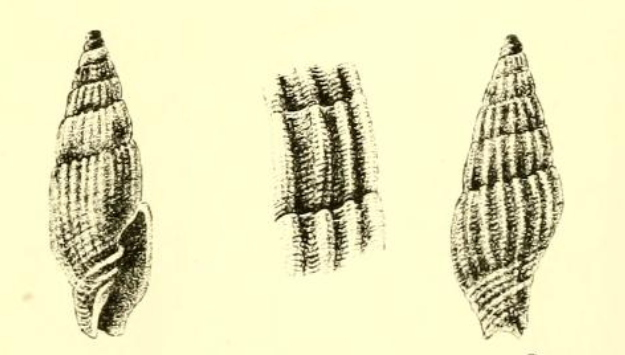
- Shell of Turriplicifer apicitinctus (holotype)

Scientific classification
- Kingdom: Animalia
- Phylum: Mollusca
- Class: Gastropoda
- Subclass: Caenogastropoda
- Order: Neogastropoda
- Superfamily: Turbinelloidea
- Family: Costellariidae
- Genus: Turriplicifer
- Species: T. apicitinctus

Binomial name
- Turriplicifer apicitinctus (Verco, 1896)

Synonyms
- Turricula apicitincta Verco, 1896; Vexillum (Costellaria) apicitinctum (Verco, 1896); Vexillum apicitinctum (Verco, 1896)

= Turriplicifer apicitinctus =

Species of gastropod

Turriplicifer apicitinctus is a species of sea snail, a marine gastropod mollusk, in the family Costellariidae, the ribbed miters.

== Description ==
The length of the shell attains 1120 mm; its breadth, 3.5 mm.; length of the aperture, 4.5 mm.; width, 1 mm.

(Original description) The turretted shell is fusiform, rather thin and shining. The spire consists of eight whorls, including the protoconch. The protoconch is distinct dextral and consists of two whorls, excentric, sometimes slightly mammillate, smooth. The suture is well marked, pinkish brown, retaining its color in the dead white shell, and prettily tinting its apex. The spire-whorls are sloping, scarcely convex, the convexity varying in different individuals. The sculpture of the shell is longitudinally finely costate throughout. The ribs are most valid in the earlier whorls, about 35 in the penultimate, slightly nodulated at the posterior suture, wider than the interstices in the earlier whorls, narrower in the later, rounded, rather broader than high The sutures are distinctly impressed. There are numerous transverse lines, three in the penultimate whorl, flattened, wider than the interstices which are scarcely more than incisions, crossing the ribs, but less valid there than in the intervening furrows. In the first three whorls, just below the suture (the distance increasing gradually in successive whorls) a well-marked transverse furrow cuts off a row of subsutural nodules from the ribs. In the fourth whorl this is less marked, and the other spiral furrows become nearly equal to it, gradually diminishing in depth towards the centre of the whorl. The body whorl is subconvex, the convexity varying slightly in different specimens, contracted just below the periphery. The ongitudinal plicae are numerous, close-set, irregular in size and distance, degenerating into marked incremental striae towards the aperture. The spiral incisions are well marked below the suture to the middle of the whorl, obsolete in front of this, though still visible under the lens. Five or six valid spiral furrows over the contracted part behind the notch. The aperture is obliquely elongately oval. The outer lip is nearly straight in the upper two-thirds, then bent to the left at an angle of 135°; simple, acute.The columella is straight for one-half its extent, then slightly bent to the left. Four plicae, sometimes the last forms the margin of the siphonal canal, sometimes is distinctly above it, equidistant, well marked, sometimes ceasing at the margin of the callus of the inner lip, which is sharply defined and at the lower part free, so as to form a minute rimate perforation with the varix of the notch. The siphoanl canal is wide, short, scarcely reflected and distinctly notched.

Ornament: the color is greyish-white, a broad indistinct pinkish-brown subsutural band, maculated at intervals with deeper brown patches. In some examples only these are visible. On the body whorl three indistinct fine bands either continuous or composed of brown dots, the highest of which appears on the spire-whorls, the lowest may be continuous over the anterior part of the shell from a little above the columellar plicae. When dead, the shell is nearly pure white with a pinkish tip, and faint brownish maculations.

== Distribution ==
This marine species is endemic to South Australia.
