= Protoelongata loyaltyensis =

Scientific classification
- Kingdom: Animalia
- Phylum: Mollusca
- Class: Gastropoda
- Subclass: Caenogastropoda
- Order: Neogastropoda
- Superfamily: Turbinelloidea
- Family: Costellariidae
- Genus: Protoelongata
- Species: P. loyaltyensis

Binomial name
- Protoelongata loyaltyensis (Hervier, 1897)

Synonyms
- Mitra (Pusia) loyaltyensis Hervier, 1897; Vexillum (Protoelongata) loyaltyense (Hervier, 1897); Vexillum (Pusia) loyaltyense (Hervier, 1897); Vexillum loyaltyense (Hervier, 1897)

Species of gastropod

Protoelongata loyaltyensis is a species of sea snail, a marine gastropod mollusk, in the family Costellariidae, the ribbed miters.

== Description ==
The length of the shell attains 13 mm.

== Distribution ==
This marine species occurs off Lifou, Loyalty Islands.
