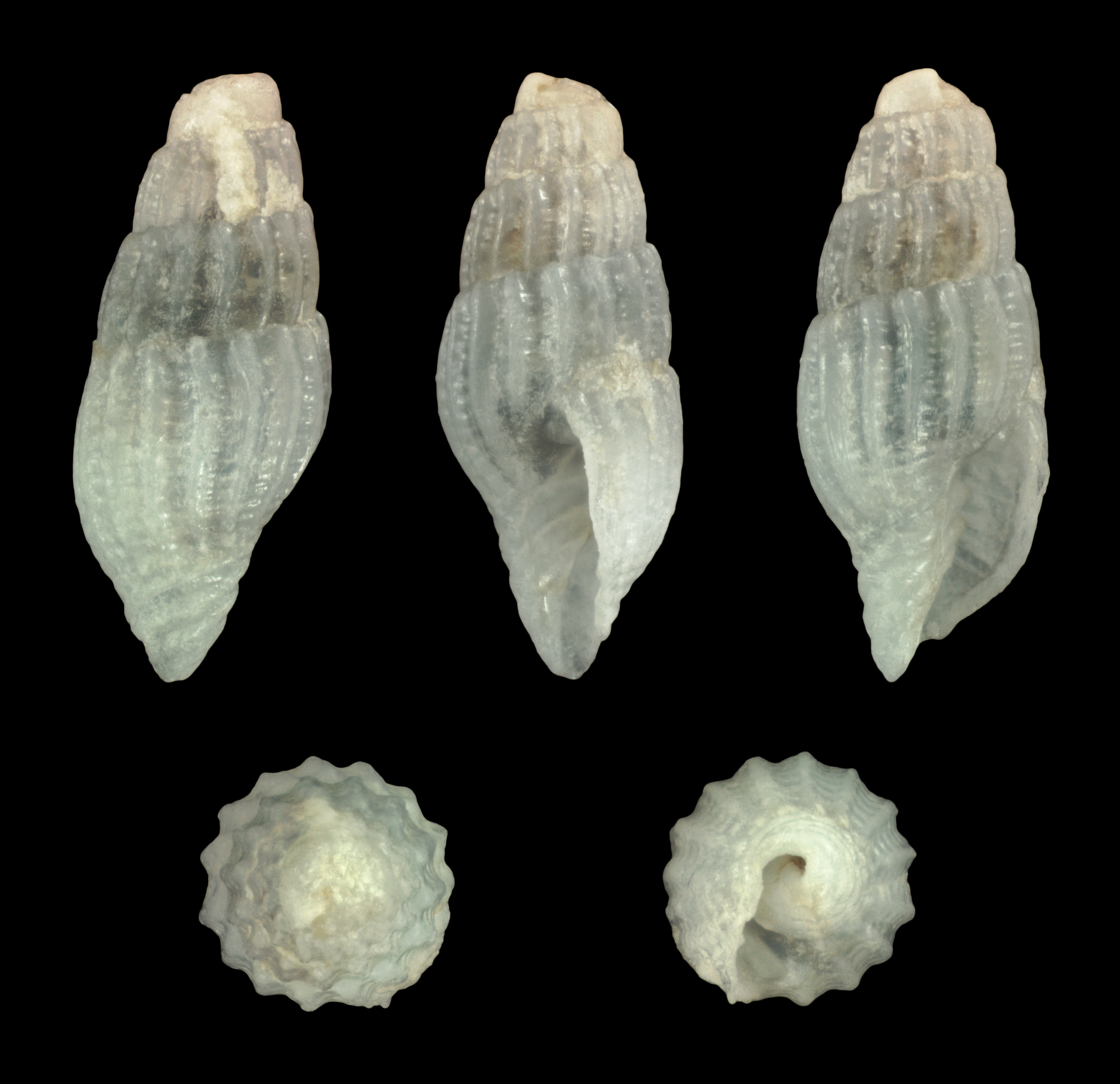
- A shell of Pilgrivexillum castum

Scientific classification
- Kingdom: Animalia
- Phylum: Mollusca
- Class: Gastropoda
- Subclass: Caenogastropoda
- Order: Neogastropoda
- Family: Costellariidae
- Genus: Pilgrivexillum
- Species: P. castum

Binomial name
- Pilgrivexillum castum (H. Adams, 1872)

Synonyms
- Mitra hastata G. B. Sowerby II, 1874; Turricula (Thala) casta H. Adams, 1872; Turricula casta H. Adams, 1872 (original combination); Vexillum (Costellaria) albatum Cernohorsky, 1988; Vexillum (Costellaria) castum (H. Adams, 1872); Vexillum (Costellaria) sagamiense (Kuroda & Habe, 1971); Vexillum albatum Cernohorsky, 1988; Vexillum castum (H. Adams, 1872) superseded combination

= Pilgrivexillum castum =

Species of gastropod

Pilgrivexillum castum is a species of small sea snail, marine gastropod mollusk in the family Costellariidae, the ribbed miters.

== Homonymy ==
Sowerby II, 1874 introduced the new replacement name Mitra hastata for Turricula casta H. Adams, 1872 non Voluta casta Gmelin, 1791, both of which he placed in Mitra, but Sowerby's name is preoccupied by M. hastata Karsten, 1849. Since the replacement name is no longer in use and the taxa are no longer considered congeneric (Gmelin's taxon is now called Scabricola casta), Adams' name should be used (ICZN Article 59.3).

== Description ==
The length of the white shell attains 8.5 mm, its diameter 3 mm.

(Original description in Latin of Vexillum castum) The white shell is rather thin and has an elongated, spindle-like shape. It is sculpted with curved, lengthwise folds, and the spaces between these folds are grooved crosswise. The spire is elongated and consists of ten scarcely convex whorls that are slightly knobby near the top. The body whorl abruptly narrows toward the front. The columella has three folds, the siphonal canal is slightly extended and curved backward, and the outer lip is sharp and simple.

== Distribution ==
This species occurs in the Red Sea; in the Indo-west and Central Pacific: from the Persian Gulf to the Society Islands and Hawaii and the Kermadec Islands; also off Papua New Guinea and Queensland (Australia).
