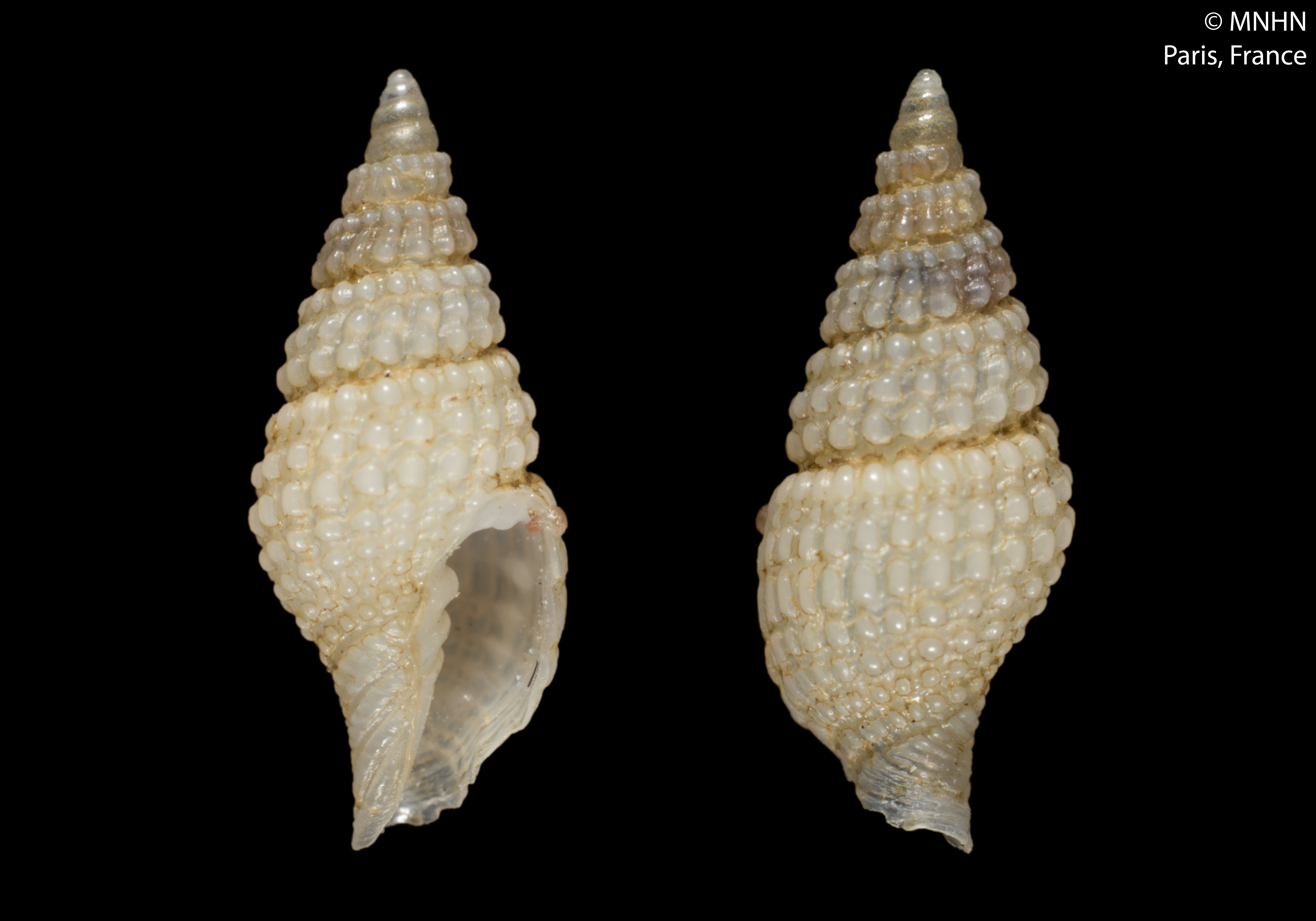
- Shell of Pilgrivexillum altisuturatum (holotype at MNHN, Paris)

Scientific classification
- Kingdom: Animalia
- Phylum: Mollusca
- Class: Gastropoda
- Subclass: Caenogastropoda
- Order: Neogastropoda
- Superfamily: Turbinelloidea
- Family: Costellariidae
- Genus: Pilgrivexillum
- Species: P. altisuturatum

Binomial name
- Pilgrivexillum altisuturatum (Chino & Herrmann, 2014)

Synonyms
- Vexillum (Costellaria) altisuturatum Chino & Herrmann, 2014; Vexillum altisuturatum Chino & Herrmann, 2014

= Pilgrivexillum altisuturatum =

Species of gastropod

Pilgrivexillum altisuturatum is a species of sea snail, a marine gastropod mollusk, in the family Costellariidae, the ribbed miters.

== Description ==
The length of the shell attains 5.2 mm.

== Distribution ==
This marine species occurs off the Philippines, Indonesia and the Solomon Islands.
