= Turriplicifer esperancensis =

Scientific classification
- Kingdom: Animalia
- Phylum: Mollusca
- Class: Gastropoda
- Subclass: Caenogastropoda
- Order: Neogastropoda
- Superfamily: Turbinelloidea
- Family: Costellariidae
- Genus: Turriplicifer
- Species: T. esperancensis

Binomial name
- Turriplicifer esperancensis (Marrow, 2013)

Synonyms
- Mitra (Mitra) esperancensis Marrow, 2013; Mitra esperancensis Marrow, 2013

Species of gastropod

Turriplicifer esperancensis is a species of sea snail, a marine gastropod mollusk, in the family Costellariidae, the ribbed miters.
