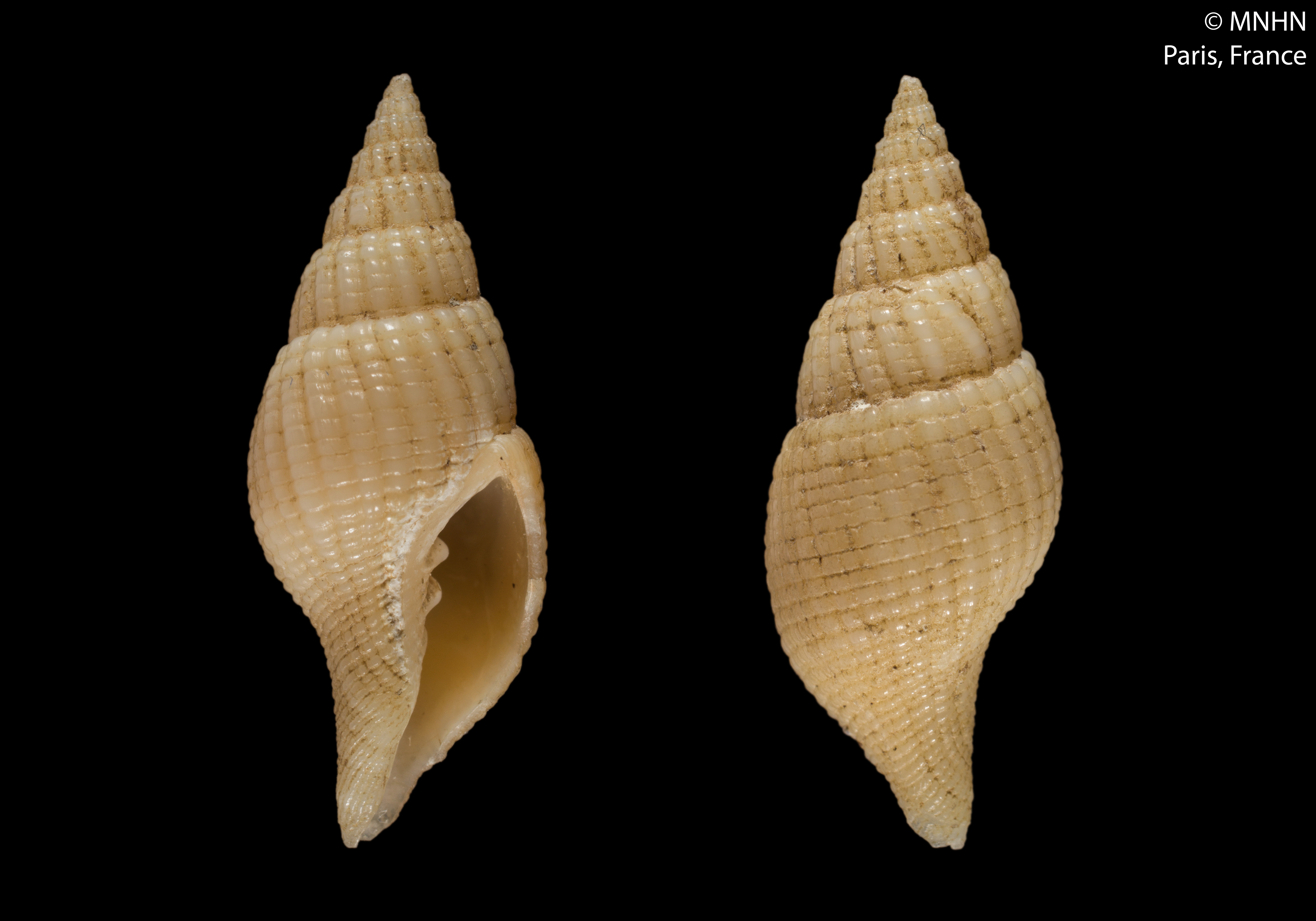
- Shell of Ceratoxancus melichrous (holotype at MNHN, Paris)

Scientific classification
- Kingdom: Animalia
- Phylum: Mollusca
- Class: Gastropoda
- Subclass: Caenogastropoda
- Order: Neogastropoda
- Family: Costellariidae
- Genus: Ceratoxancus
- Species: C. melichrous

Binomial name
- Ceratoxancus melichrous Kantor & Bouchet, 1997

= Ceratoxancus melichrous =

Species of gastropod

Ceratoxancus melichrous is a species of sea snail, a marine gastropod mollusk in the family Costellariidae.

== Distribution ==
This marine species occurs off New Caledonia.
