= Atlantilux narcisselli =

Scientific classification
- Kingdom: Animalia
- Phylum: Mollusca
- Class: Gastropoda
- Subclass: Caenogastropoda
- Order: Neogastropoda
- Superfamily: Turbinelloidea
- Family: Costellariidae
- Genus: Atlantilux
- Species: A. narcisselli

Binomial name
- Atlantilux narcisselli Huang, 2015

Species of gastropod

Atlantilux narcisselli is a species of sea snail, a marine gastropod mollusk, in the family Costellariidae, the ribbed miters.

== Distribution ==
This species occurs in San Blas.
