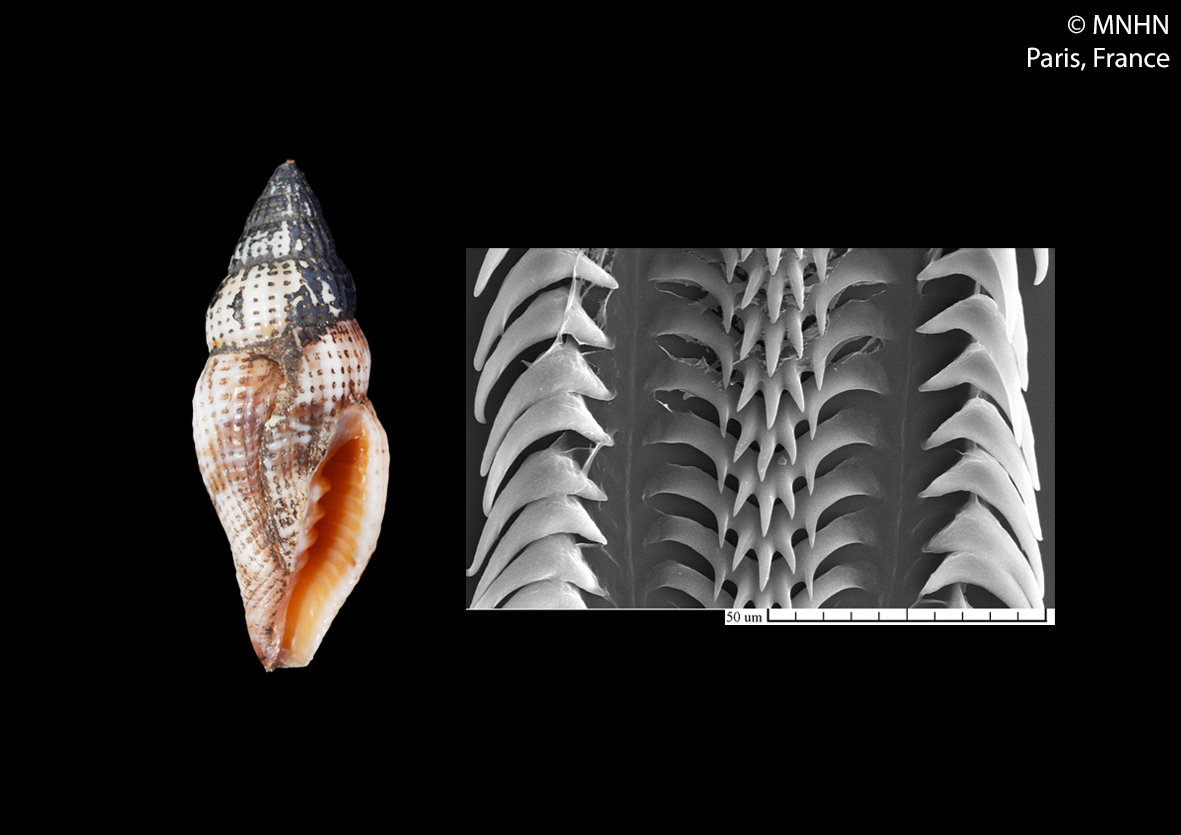
- Nodicostellaria laterculata (specimen at MNHN, Paris)

Scientific classification
- Kingdom: Animalia
- Phylum: Mollusca
- Class: Gastropoda
- Subclass: Caenogastropoda
- Order: Neogastropoda
- Superfamily: Turbinelloidea
- Family: Costellariidae
- Genus: Nodicostellaria
- Species: N. laterculata

Binomial name
- Nodicostellaria laterculata (G. B. Sowerby II, 1874)

Synonyms
- Mitra laterculata G. B. Sowerby II, 1874; Mitra oriflavens Melvill, 1925 junior subjective synonym; Vexillum (Costellaria) laterculatum (G. B. Sowerby II, 1874); Vexillum laterculatum (G. B. Sowerby II, 1874)

= Nodicostellaria laterculata =

Species of gastropod

Nodicostellaria laterculata is a species of sea snail, a marine gastropod mollusk, in the family Costellariidae, the ribbed miters.

== Description ==
The fusiform shell is cancellated. The spire is as long as the aperture. The whorls are angular. The body whorl is acuminated anteriorly, ornamented in the middle with a broad band bordered at each edge with tile-like spots. The aperture is ridged within.

== Distribution ==
This marine species occurs off Guadeloupe.
