= Atlantilux sykesi =

Scientific classification
- Kingdom: Animalia
- Phylum: Mollusca
- Class: Gastropoda
- Subclass: Caenogastropoda
- Order: Neogastropoda
- Superfamily: Turbinelloidea
- Family: Costellariidae
- Genus: Atlantilux
- Species: A. sykesi

Binomial name
- Atlantilux sykesi (Melvill, 1925)

Synonyms
- Mitra (Pusia) sykesi Melvill, 1925 (basionym); Mitra moisei McGinty, 1955 junior subjective synonym; Pusia sykesi (Melvill, 1925); Vexillum (Pusia) sykesi (Melvill, 1925) ·; Vexillum moisei (J.C. Melvill, 1925)

Species of gastropod

Atlantilux sykesi is a species of small sea snail, marine gastropod mollusk within the family Costellariidae, the ribbed miters.

== Description ==
The length of the shell attains 9 mm.

== Distribution ==
Atlantilux sykesi can be found in Aruba, Belize, Bonaire, the Caribbean Sea, Costa Rica, Cuba, the Gulf of Mexico, the Lesser Antilles, and Panama; also off Brazil.
