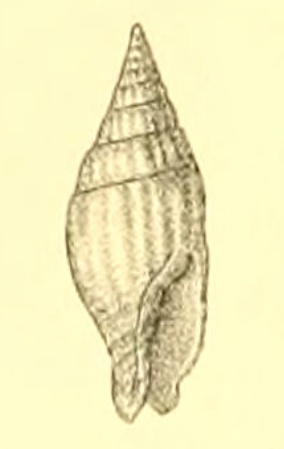
- Drawing of a shell of Protoelongata xerampelina

Scientific classification
- Kingdom: Animalia
- Phylum: Mollusca
- Class: Gastropoda
- Subclass: Caenogastropoda
- Order: Neogastropoda
- Superfamily: Turbinelloidea
- Family: Costellariidae
- Genus: Protoelongata
- Species: P. xerampelina

Binomial name
- Protoelongata xerampelina (Melvill, 1895)

Synonyms
- Mitra xerampelina Melvill, 1895; Vexillum (Protoelongata) xerampelinum (Melvill, 1895); Vexillum xerampelinum (Melvill, 1895)

= Protoelongata xerampelina =

Species of gastropod

Protoelongata xerampelina is a species of sea snail, a marine gastropod mollusk, in the family Costellariidae (the ribbed miters).

== Description ==
Originally described as Mitra xerampelina, this is a somewhat shining, dark-red shell, cylindraceous, much attenuate and black towards the apex. It contains ten whorls. It is longitudinally costate, the ribs compressed, and is transversely finely striate. The last three whorls are more or less ventricose. The siphonal canal is slightly produced and recurved. In the type specimen, the epidermis is still adherent to the interstices of the body whorl, between the ribs.

== Distribution ==
This marine species occurs off Aden.
