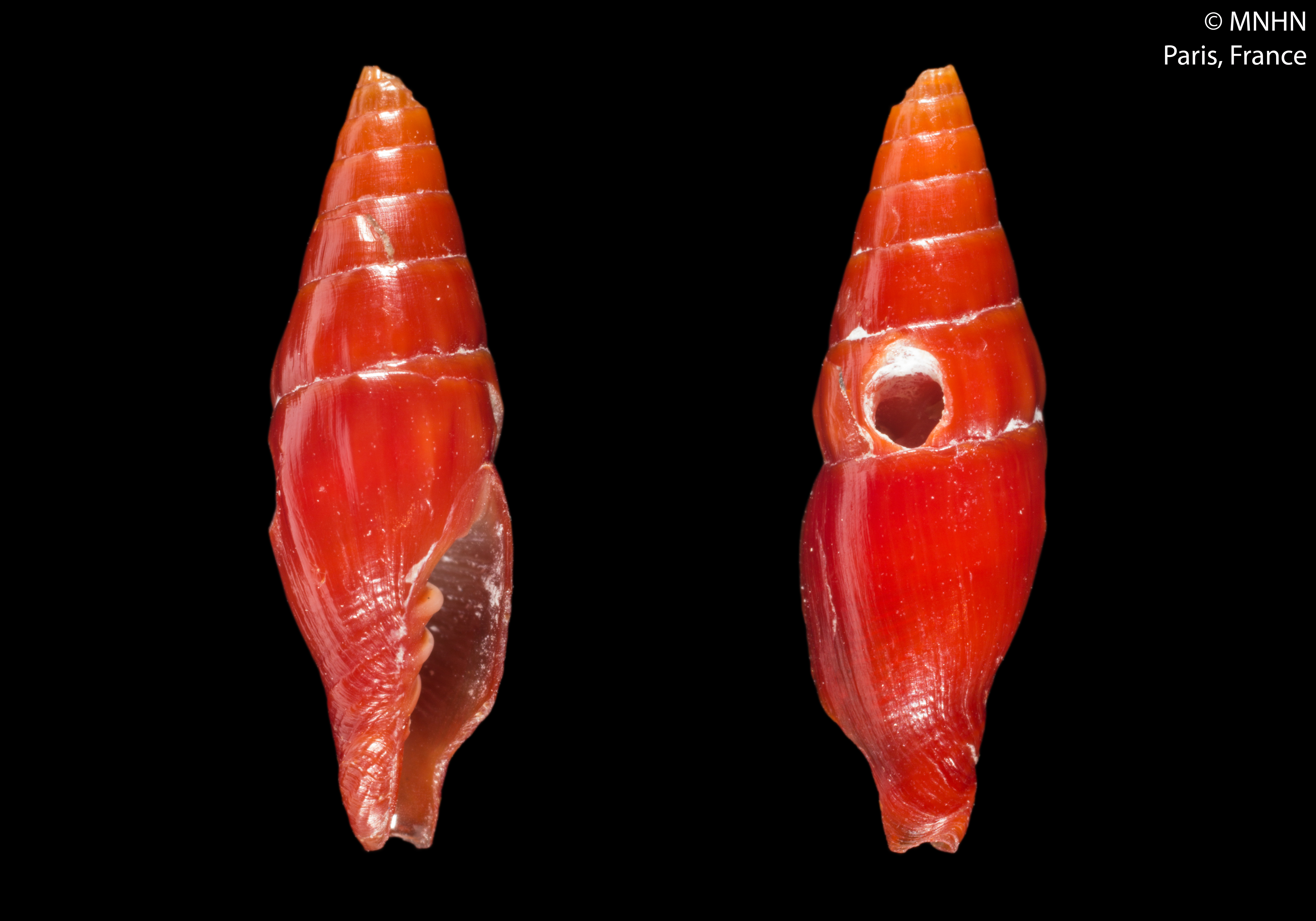
- Shell of Protoelongata dekkersi (holotype at MNHN, Paris)

Scientific classification
- Kingdom: Animalia
- Phylum: Mollusca
- Class: Gastropoda
- Subclass: Caenogastropoda
- Order: Neogastropoda
- Superfamily: Turbinelloidea
- Family: Costellariidae
- Genus: Protoelongata
- Species: P. dekkersi

Binomial name
- Protoelongata dekkersi (Herrmann, Stossier & Salisbury, 2014)

Synonyms
- Vexillum (Protoelongata) dekkersi Herrmann, Stossier & Salisbury, 2014; Vexillum dekkersi Herrmann, Stossier & Salisbury, 2014

= Protoelongata dekkersi =

Species of gastropod

Protoelongata dekkersi is a species of sea snail, a marine gastropod mollusk, in the family Costellariidae, the ribbed miters.
