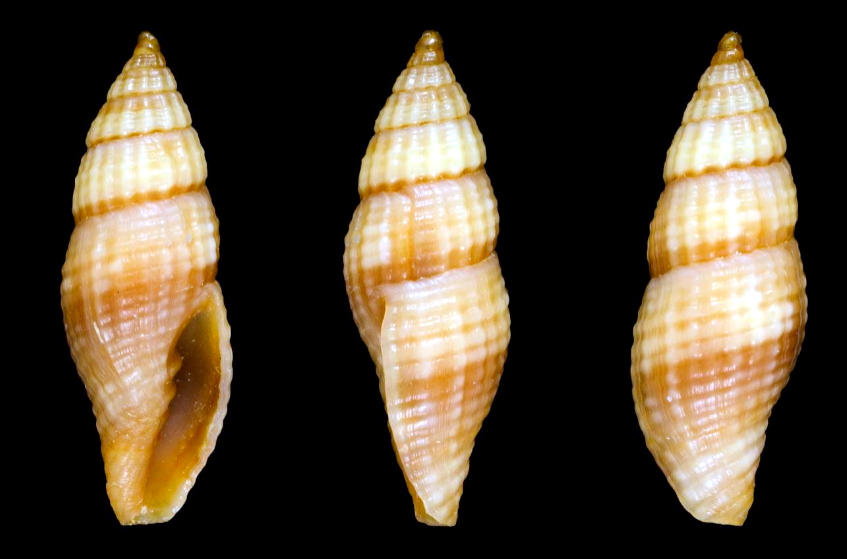
- Nodicostellaria kaicherae (specimen at the Smithsonian Institution)

Scientific classification
- Kingdom: Animalia
- Phylum: Mollusca
- Class: Gastropoda
- Subclass: Caenogastropoda
- Order: Neogastropoda
- Superfamily: Turbinelloidea
- Family: Costellariidae
- Genus: Nodicostellaria
- Species: N. kaicherae

Binomial name
- Nodicostellaria kaicherae (Petuch, 1979)

Synonyms
- Costellaria kaicherae Petuch, 1979; Vexillum (Costellaria) kaicherae Petuch, 1979 superseded combination; Vexillum (Costellaria) lixa Petuch, 1979; Vexillum (Nodicostellaria) kaicherae (Petuch, 1979); Vexillum lixa Petuch, 1979

= Nodicostellaria kaicherae =

Species of mollusc

Nodicostellaria kaicherae is a species of sea snail, a marine gastropod mollusk, in the family Costellariidae, the ribbed miters.

== Description ==
The only reported location of Nodicostellaria kaicherae is in the Atlantic Ocean just east of the Caribbean Sea and off the northeast coast of Venezuela.
