= Pilgrivexillum sagamiense =

Scientific classification
- Kingdom: Animalia
- Phylum: Mollusca
- Class: Gastropoda
- Subclass: Caenogastropoda
- Order: Neogastropoda
- Superfamily: Turbinelloidea
- Family: Costellariidae
- Genus: Pilgrivexillum
- Species: P. sagamiense

Binomial name
- Pilgrivexillum sagamiense (Kuroda & T. Habe, 1971)

Synonyms
- Pusia sagamiensis Kuroda & T. Habe, 1971 superseded combination; Vexillum (Costellaria) sagamiense (Kuroda & T. Habe, 1971) superseded

Species of gastropod

Pilgrivexillum sagamiense is a species of sea snail, a marine gastropod mollusk, in the family Costellariidae, the ribbed miters.

== Distribution ==
This marine species occurs in Sagami Bay, Japan.
