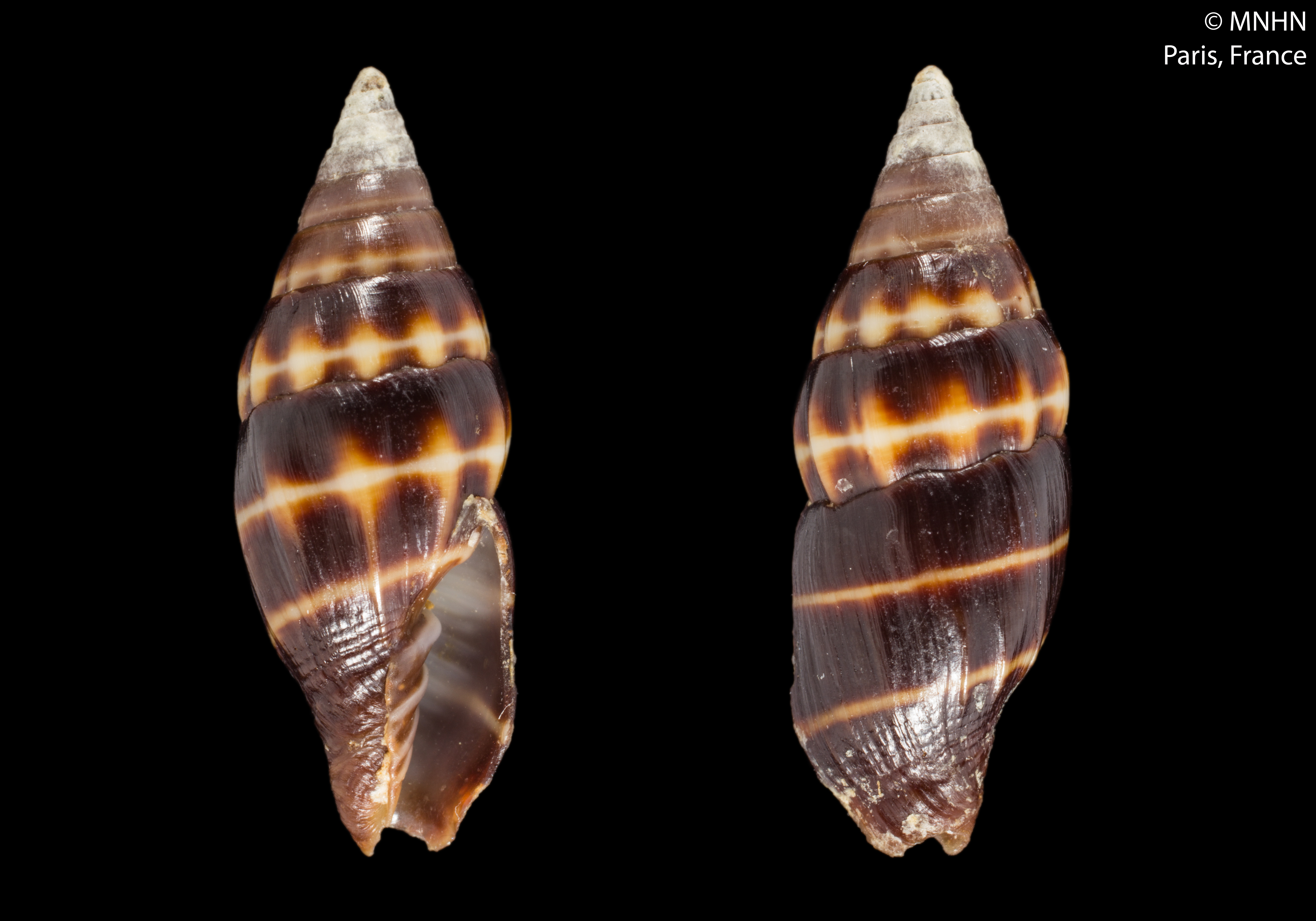
- Shell of Protoelongata heleneae (holotype at MNHN, Paris)

Scientific classification
- Kingdom: Animalia
- Phylum: Mollusca
- Class: Gastropoda
- Subclass: Caenogastropoda
- Order: Neogastropoda
- Superfamily: Turbinelloidea
- Family: Costellariidae
- Genus: Protoelongata
- Species: P. heleneae

Binomial name
- Protoelongata heleneae (Herrmann, Stossier & Salisbury, 2014)

Synonyms
- Vexillum (Protoelongata) heleneae Herrmann, Stossier & Salisbury, 2014; Vexillum heleneae Herrmann, Stossier & Salisbury, 2014

= Protoelongata heleneae =

Species of gastropod

Protoelongata heleneae is a species of sea snail, a marine gastropod mollusk, in the family Costellariidae, the ribbed miters.

== Description ==
The length of the shell attains 11 mm.

== Distribution ==
This marine species occurs off Guam.
