= Pacifilux andreiae =

Scientific classification
- Kingdom: Animalia
- Phylum: Mollusca
- Class: Gastropoda
- Subclass: Caenogastropoda
- Order: Neogastropoda
- Superfamily: Turbinelloidea
- Family: Costellariidae
- Genus: Pacifilux
- Species: P. andreiae

Binomial name
- Pacifilux andreiae (Gori & R. Salisbury, 2024)

Synonyms
- Vexillum andreiae Gori & Salisbury, 2024 superseded combination

Species of sea snail

Pacifilux andreiae is a species of sea snail, a marine gastropod mollusk, in the family Costellariidae, the ribbed miters.

== Distribution ==
This marine species occurs off Dhofar, Oman.
