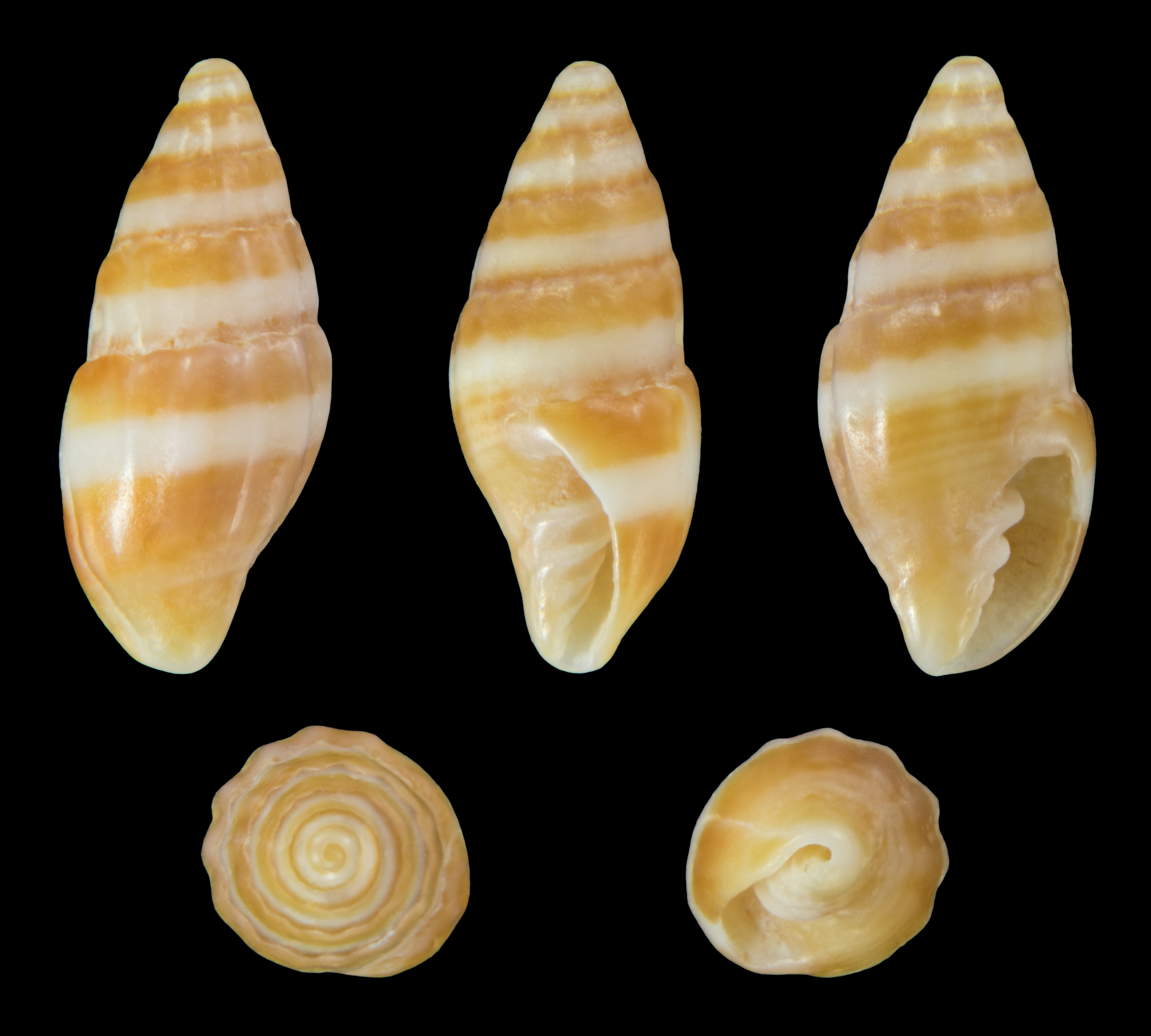

Scientific classification
- Kingdom: Animalia
- Phylum: Mollusca
- Class: Gastropoda
- Subclass: Caenogastropoda
- Order: Neogastropoda
- Superfamily: Turbinelloidea
- Family: Costellariidae
- Genus: Protoelongata
- Species: P. bilineata

Binomial name
- Protoelongata bilineata (Reeve, 1845)

Synonyms
- Mitra bilineata Reeve, 1845; Vexillum (Protoelongata) bilineatum (Reeve, 1845); Vexillum (Pusia) bilineatum (Reeve, 1845); Vexillum bilineatum (Reeve, 1845)

= Protoelongata bilineata =

Species of gastropod

Protoelongata bilineata is a species of sea snail, a marine gastropod mollusk, in the family Costellariidae, the ribbed miters.
