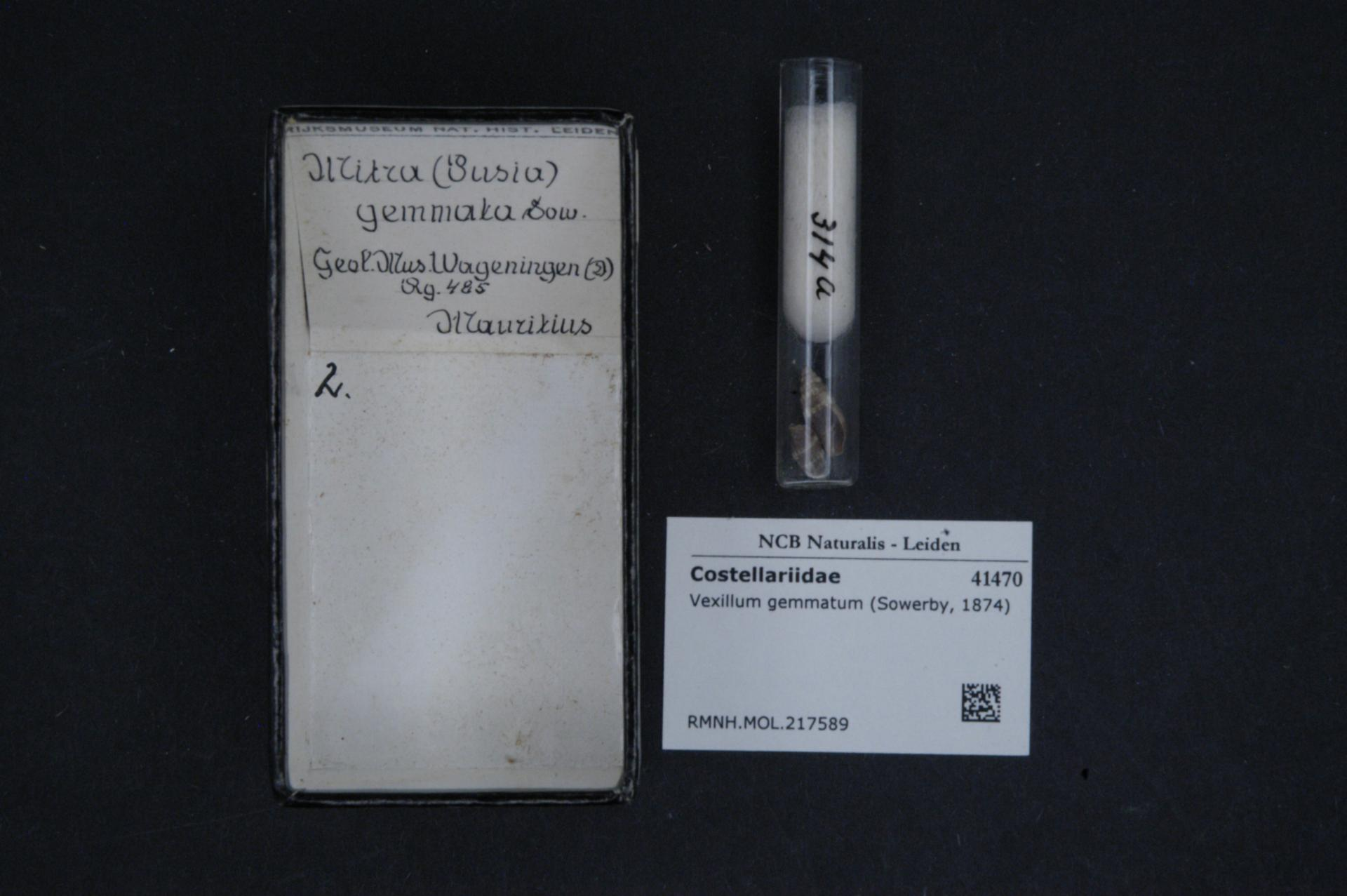

Scientific classification
- Kingdom: Animalia
- Phylum: Mollusca
- Class: Gastropoda
- Subclass: Caenogastropoda
- Order: Neogastropoda
- Superfamily: Turbinelloidea
- Family: Costellariidae
- Genus: Atlantilux
- Species: A. gemmata

Binomial name
- Atlantilux gemmata (G. B. Sowerby II, 1874)

Synonyms
- Mitra albocincta C. B. Adams, 1845 (ambiguous senior synonym); Mitra gemmata G. B. Sowerby II, 1874; Pusia gemmata (G. B. Sowerby II, 1874); Vexillum gemmatum (G. B. Sowerby II, 1874)

= Atlantilux gemmata =

Species of gastropod

Atlantilux gemmata is a species of sea snail, a marine gastropod mollusk, in the family Costellariidae, the ribbed miters.

== Description ==
(Original description) The small shell is rather fusiform. It is brown and smooth. The spire is as long as aperture. The whorls are rather angular, ribbed above the middle. The ribs are jewelled with oval white spots.
