= Suluspira rosenbergi =

Scientific classification
- Kingdom: Animalia
- Phylum: Mollusca
- Class: Gastropoda
- Subclass: Caenogastropoda
- Order: Neogastropoda
- Superfamily: Turbinelloidea
- Family: Costellariidae
- Genus: Suluspira
- Species: S. rosenbergi

Binomial name
- Suluspira rosenbergi (Poppe, Guillot de Suduiraut & Tagaro, 2006)

Synonyms
- Visaya rosenbergi Poppe, Guillot de Suduiraut & Tagaro, 2006

Species of gastropod

Suluspira rosenbergi is a species of sea snail, a marine gastropod mollusk, in the family Costellariidae, the ribbed miters.
