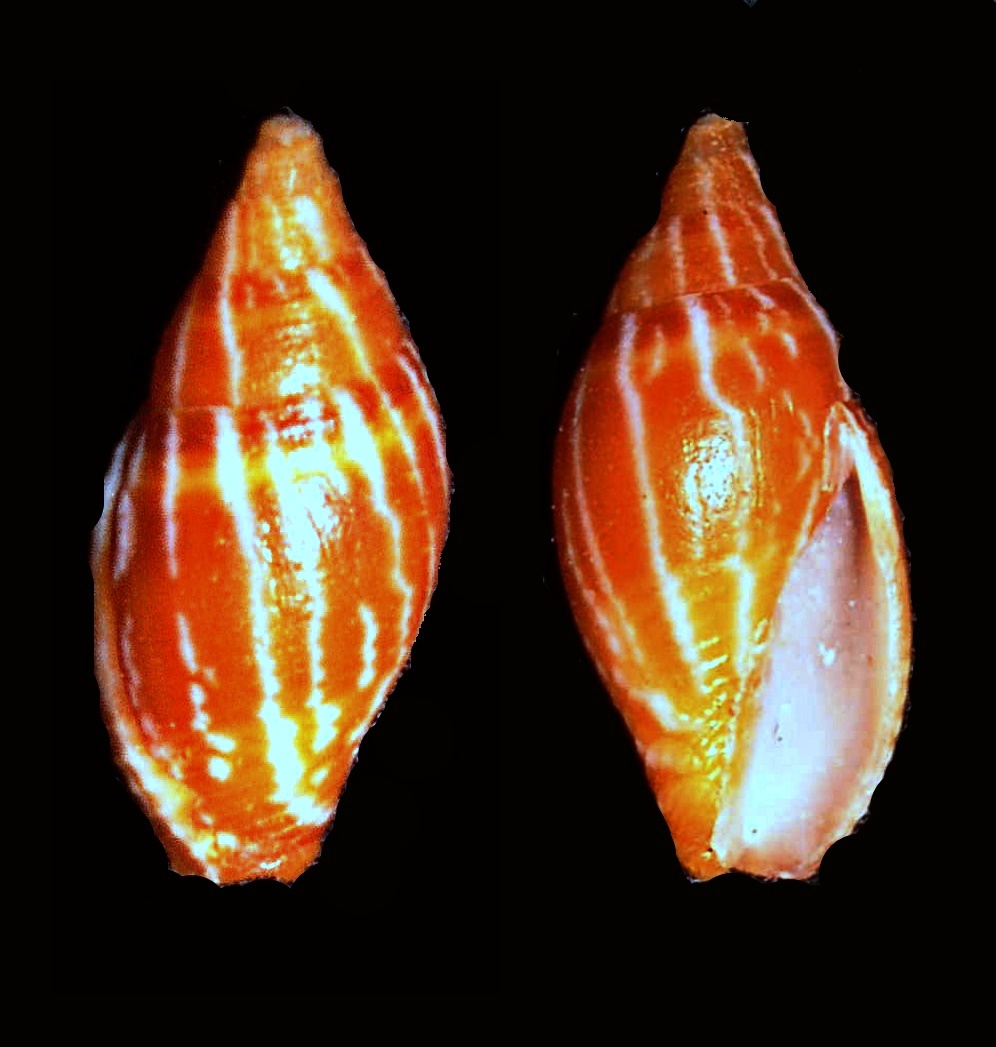
- Shell of Vexillum consanguineum

Scientific classification
- Kingdom: Animalia
- Phylum: Mollusca
- Class: Gastropoda
- Subclass: Caenogastropoda
- Order: Neogastropoda
- Superfamily: Turbinelloidea
- Family: Costellariidae
- Genus: Vexillum
- Species: V. consanguineum

Binomial name
- Vexillum consanguineum (Reeve, 1845)

Synonyms
- Mitra consanguinea Reeve, 1845

= Vexillum consanguineum =

Species of gastropod

Vexillum consanguineum, common name the kindred mitre, is a species of sea snail, a marine gastropod mollusk, in the family Costellariidae, the ribbed miters.

== Description ==
The length of the shell attains 14.5 mm.

(Original description) The shell is ovate, rather solid and stout. It is contracted towards the base. The spire is obtusely rounded. The shell is transversely very finely striated with punctures, longitudinally closely plicate!y ribbed. The ribs are granose at the lower part. The shell is dark red. The whorls are encircled round the middle with a row of small round white spots. The columella is four-plaited.

== Distribution ==
This marine species occurs off the Philippines.
