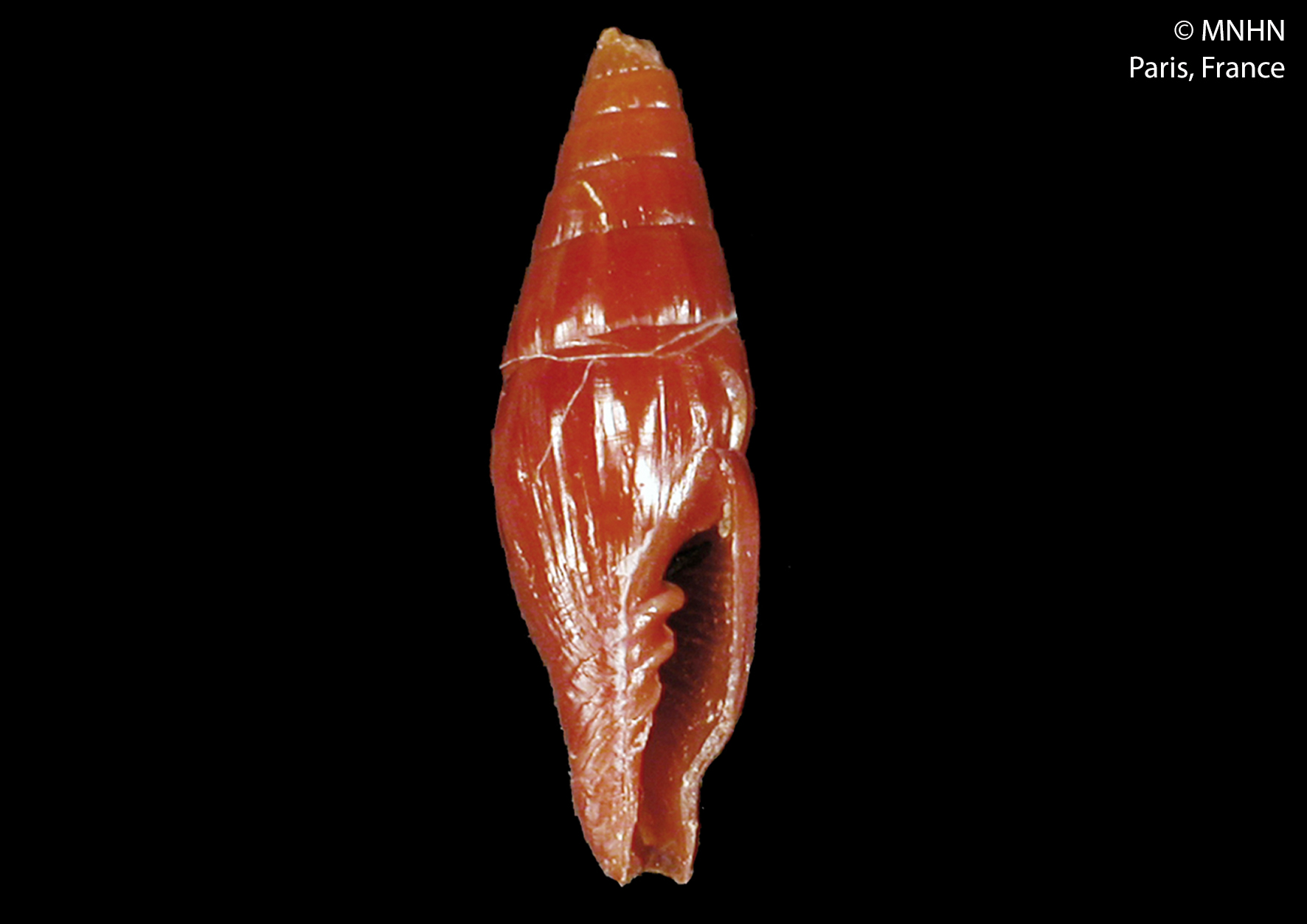
- Shell of Protoelongata dekkersi (holotype at MNHN, Paris)

Scientific classification
- Kingdom: Animalia
- Phylum: Mollusca
- Class: Gastropoda
- Subclass: Caenogastropoda
- Order: Neogastropoda
- Superfamily: Turbinelloidea
- Family: Costellariidae
- Genus: Protoelongata; Herrmann, Stossier & Salisbury, 2014

Type species
- Vexillum (Protoelongata) dekkersi Herrmann, Stossier & R. Salisbury, 2014

Synonyms
- Vexillum (Protoelongata) Herrmann, Stossier & Salisbury, 2014

= Protoelongata =

Genus of gastropods

Protoelongata is a genus of sea snails, marine gastropod molluscs, in the family Costellariidae, the ribbed miters.

== Species ==
Species within the genus Protoelongata include:

- Protoelongata bilineata (Reeve, 1845)
- Protoelongata corallina (Reeve, 1845)
- Protoelongata dekkersi (Herrmann, Stossier & Salisbury, 2014)
- Protoelongata heleneae (Herrmann, Stossier & Salisbury, 2014)
- Protoelongata loyaltyensis (Hervier, 1897)
- Protoelongata rubrotaeniata (Herrmann, Stossier & Salisbury, 2014)
- Protoelongata thorssoni (Poppe, E. Guillot de Suduiraut & Tagaro, 2006)
- Protoelongata xerampelina (Melvill, 1895)
