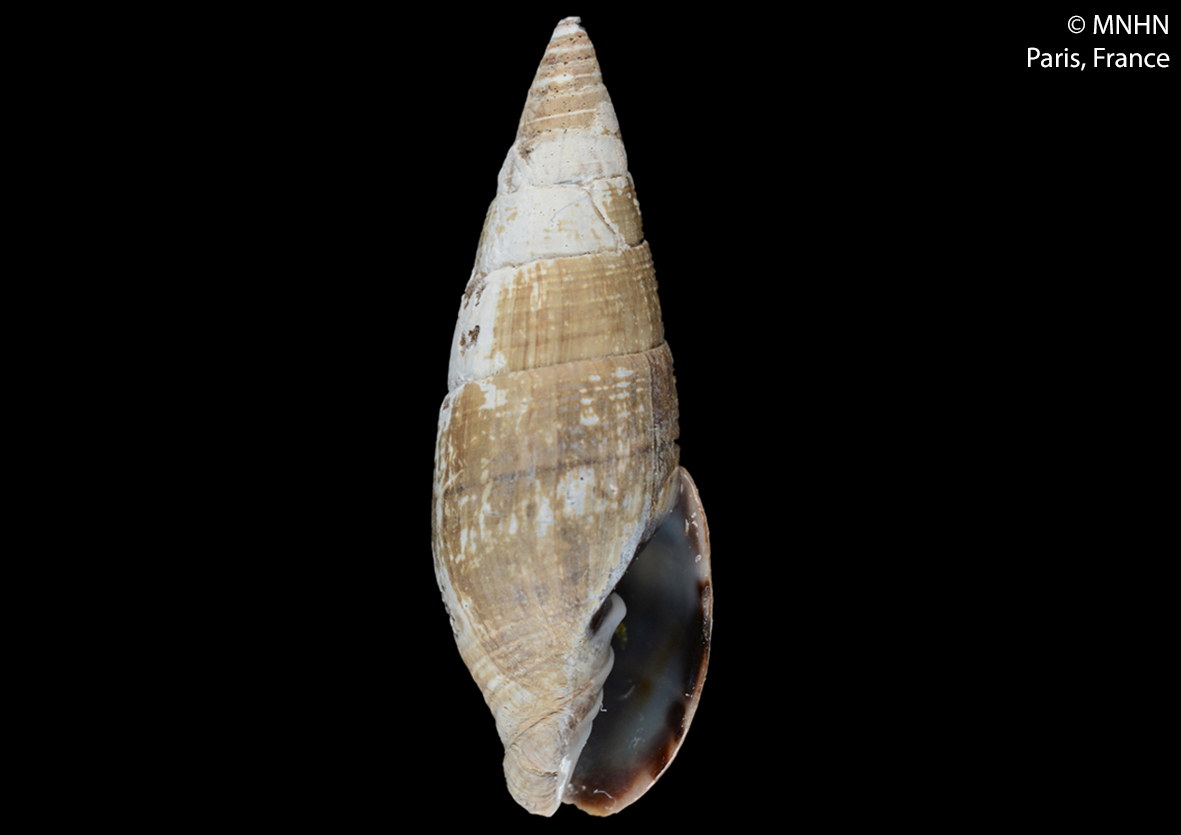
- Shell of Turriplicifer australis

Scientific classification
- Kingdom: Animalia
- Phylum: Mollusca
- Class: Gastropoda
- Subclass: Caenogastropoda
- Order: Neogastropoda
- Superfamily: Turbinelloidea
- Family: Costellariidae
- Genus: Turriplicifer; Fedosov, Marrow, Herrmann & Bouchet, 2017

Type species
- Mitra australis Swainson, 1820

= Turriplicifer =

Genus of gastropods

Turriplicifer is a genus of sea snails, marine gastropod mollusks, in the family Costellariidae, the ribbed miters.

== Species ==
Species within the genus Turriplicifer include:

- Turriplicifer apicitinctus (Verco, 1896)
- Turriplicifer australis (Swainson, 1820)
- Turriplicifer esperancensis (Marrow, 2013)
