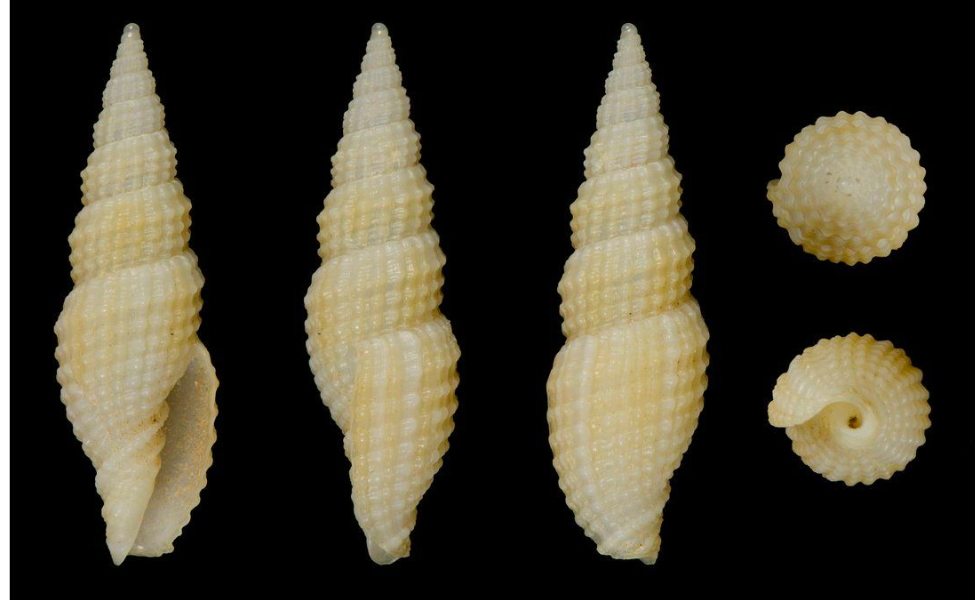
- Shell of Bathythala kremerae (holotype at the Smithsonian Institution)

Scientific classification
- Kingdom: Animalia
- Phylum: Mollusca
- Class: Gastropoda
- Subclass: Caenogastropoda
- Order: Neogastropoda
- Superfamily: Turbinelloidea
- Family: Costellariidae
- Genus: Bathythala
- Species: B. kremerae

Binomial name
- Bathythala kremerae (Petuch, 1987)

Synonyms
- Nodicostellaria kremerae Petuch, 1987 superseded combination; Vexillum (Nodicostellaria) kremerae (Petuch, 1987)

= Bathythala kremerae =

Species of gastropod

Bathythala kremerae is a species of sea snail, a marine gastropod mollusk, in the family Costellariidae, the ribbed miters.

== Description ==
Original description: "General shell form and sculpture as for genus; shoulder angled; spiral and axial cords large, with intersections producing uniform beaded surface; color pale tan with darker tan cloudings; interior of aperture pale tan."

== Distribution ==
Locus typicus: "Off Puerto Fijo, Paraguana Peninsula, Gulf of Venezuela, Venezuela."
