= Bathythala crassa =

Scientific classification
- Kingdom: Animalia
- Phylum: Mollusca
- Class: Gastropoda
- Subclass: Caenogastropoda
- Order: Neogastropoda
- Superfamily: Turbinelloidea
- Family: Costellariidae
- Genus: Bathythala
- Species: B. crassa

Binomial name
- Bathythala crassa (Simone, 1995)

Synonyms
- Nodicostellaria crassa (Simone, 1995) superseded combination; Thala crassa (Simone, 1995); Vexillum (Nodicostellaria) crassum (Simone, 1995)

Species of gastropod

Bathythala crassa is a species of sea snail, a marine gastropod mollusk, in the family Costellariidae, the ribbed miters.

== Distribution ==
This species occurs off the southern coast of Brazil.
