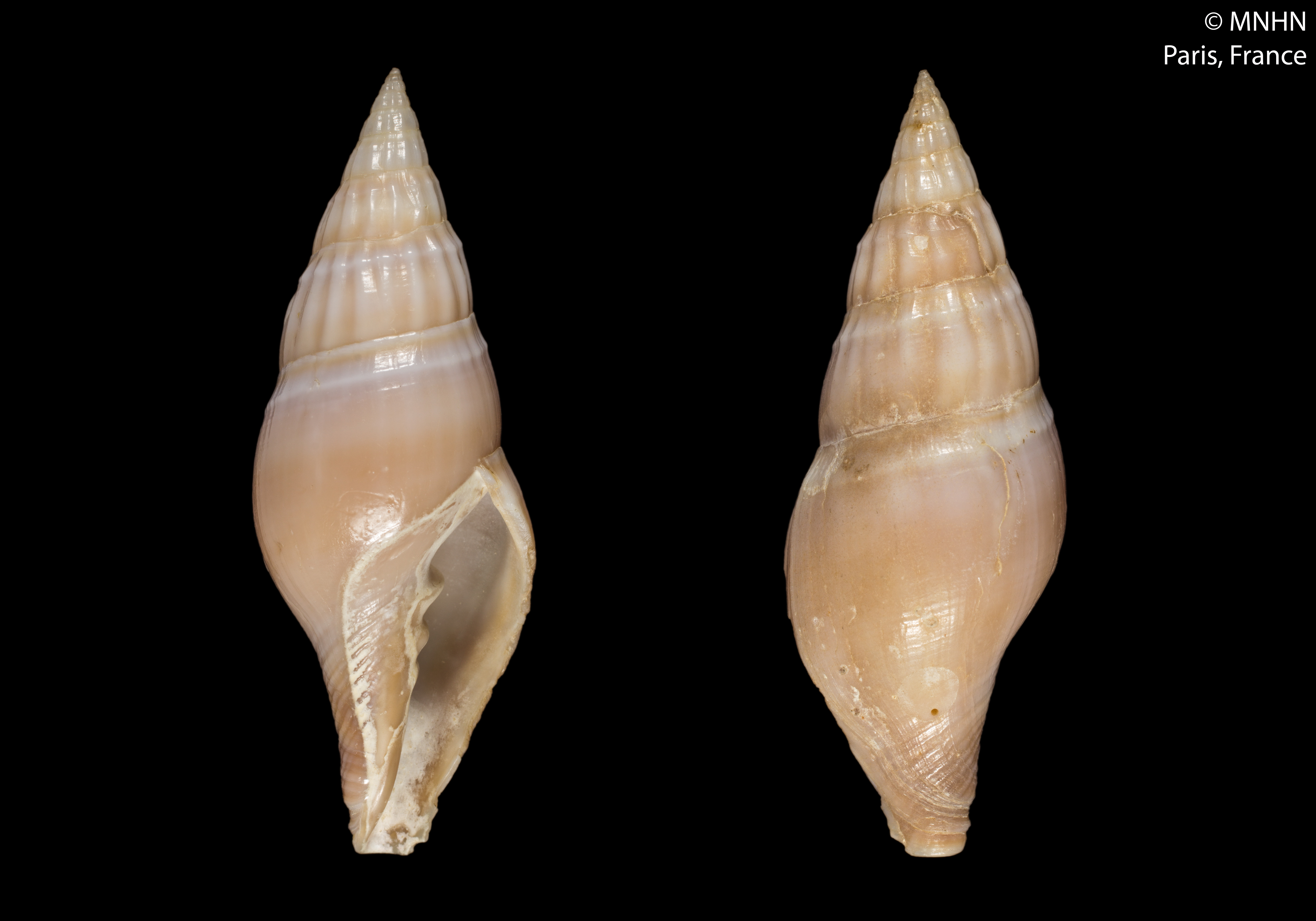
- Shell of Ceratoxancus basileus

Scientific classification
- Kingdom: Animalia
- Phylum: Mollusca
- Class: Gastropoda
- Subclass: Caenogastropoda
- Order: Neogastropoda
- Superfamily: Turbinelloidea
- Family: Costellariidae
- Genus: Ceratoxancus; Kuroda, 1952

Type species
- Ceratoxancus teramachii Kuroda, 1952

= Ceratoxancus =

Genus of gastropods

Ceratoxancus is a genus of sea snails, marine gastropod mollusks in the family Costellariidae.

== Species ==
Species within the genus Ceratoxancus include:

- Ceratoxancus basileus Kantor & Bouchet, 1997
- Ceratoxancus elongatus Sakurai, 1958
- Ceratoxancus leios Kantor & Bouchet, 1997
- Ceratoxancus lorenzi Poppe, Tagaro & Sarino, 2012
- Ceratoxancus melichrous Kantor & Bouchet, 1997
- Ceratoxancus niveus Kantor & Bouchet, 1997
- Ceratoxancus teramachii Kuroda, 1952

== Classification ==
Biota > Animalia (Kingdom) > Mollusca (Phylum) > Gastropoda (Class) > Caenogastropoda (Subclass) > Neogastropoda (Order) > Turbinelloidea (Superfamily) > Costellariidae (Family) > Ceratoxancus (Genus)
