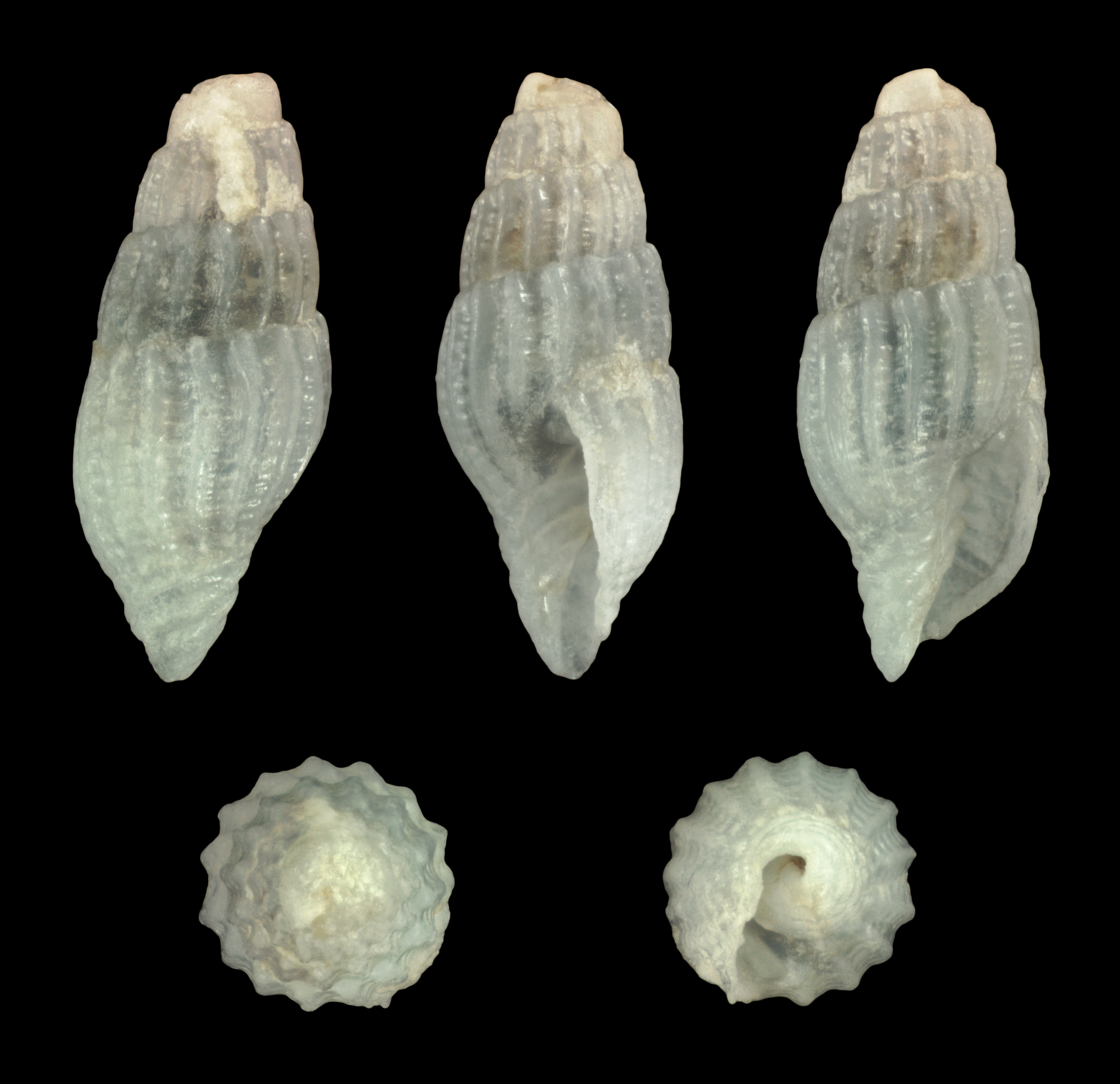
- Shell of Pilgrivexillum castum

Scientific classification
- Kingdom: Animalia
- Phylum: Mollusca
- Class: Gastropoda
- Subclass: Caenogastropoda
- Order: Neogastropoda
- Superfamily: Turbinelloidea
- Family: Costellariidae
- Genus: Pilgrivexillum; Fedosov, Bouchet, Dekkers, Gori, S.-I Huang, Kantor, Lemarcis, Marrow, Ratti, Rosenberg, R. Salisbury, Zvonareva & Puillandre, 2025

Type species
- Pilgrivexillum corbariae Fedosov, Bouchet, Dekkers, Gori, S.-I Huang, Kantor, Lemarcis, Marrow, Ratti, Rosenberg, R. Salisbury, Zvonareva & Puillandre, 2025

= Pilgrivexillum =

Genus of gastropods

Pilgrivexillum is a genus of small to medium-sized sea snails, marine gastropod molluscs in the family Costellariidae.

== Species ==
- Pilgrivexillum altisuturatum (Chino & Herrmann, 2014)
- Pilgrivexillum castum (H. Adams, 1872)
- Pilgrivexillum corbariae Fedosov, Bouchet, Dekkers, Gori, S.-I Huang, Kantor, Lemarcis, Marrow, Ratti, Rosenberg, R. Salisbury, Zvonareva & Puillandre, 2025
- Pilgrivexillum nodospiculum (Cernohorsky, 1970)
- Pilgrivexillum sagamiense (Kuroda & T. Habe, 1971)
