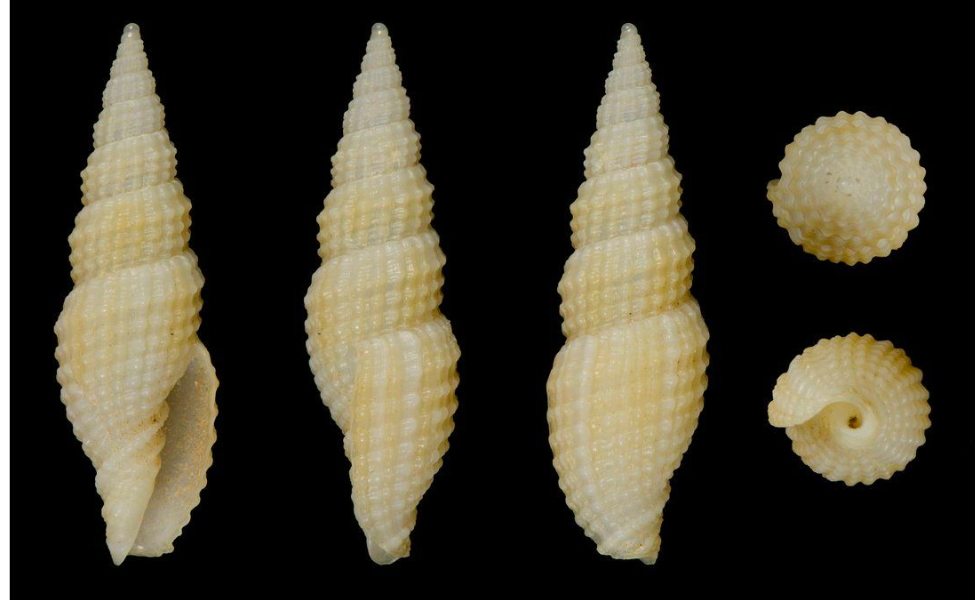
- Shell of Bathythala kremerae

Scientific classification
- Kingdom: Animalia
- Phylum: Mollusca
- Class: Gastropoda
- Subclass: Caenogastropoda
- Order: Neogastropoda
- Superfamily: Turbinelloidea
- Family: Costellariidae
- Genus: Bathythala; Fedosov, Bouchet, Dekkers, Gori, S.-I Huang, Kantor, Lemarcis, Marrow, Ratti, Rosenberg, R. Salisbury, Zvonareva & Puillandre, 2025

Type species
- Bathythala antea Fedosov, Bouchet, Dekkers, Gori, S.-I Huang, Kantor, Lemarcis, Marrow, Ratti, Rosenberg, R. Salisbury, Zvonareva & Puillandre, 2025

= Bathythala =

Genus of gastropods

Bathythala is a genus of small to medium-sized sea snails, marine gastropod molluscs in the family Costellariidae.

== Species ==
- Bathythala antea Fedosov, Bouchet, Dekkers, Gori, S.-I Huang, Kantor, Lemarcis, Marrow, Ratti, Rosenberg, R. Salisbury, Zvonareva & Puillandre, 2025
- Bathythala crassa (Simone, 1995)
- Bathythala kremerae (Petuch, 1987)

== Distribution ==
These species are found in deep waters of the Caribbean Sea and off Brazil.
