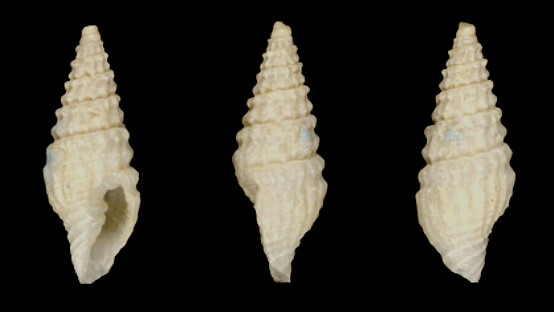
- Shell of Pilgrivexillum nodospiculum (specimen at the Smithsonian Institution)

Scientific classification
- Kingdom: Animalia
- Phylum: Mollusca
- Class: Gastropoda
- Subclass: Caenogastropoda
- Order: Neogastropoda
- Superfamily: Turbinelloidea
- Family: Costellariidae
- Genus: Pilgrivexillum
- Species: P. nodospiculum

Binomial name
- Pilgrivexillum nodospiculum (Cernohorsky, 1970)

Synonyms
- Atlantilux nodospicula (Cernohorsky, 1970); Vexillum (Costellaria) nodospiculum Cernohorsky, 1970; Vexillum nodospiculum Cernohorsky, 1970

= Pilgrivexillum nodospiculum =

Species of gastropod

Pilgrivexillum nodospiculum is a species of sea snail, a marine gastropod mollusk, in the family Costellariidae, the ribbed miters.

== Distribution ==
This marine species occurs off the Philippines.
