= Pacifilux =

Scientific classification
- Kingdom: Animalia
- Phylum: Mollusca
- Class: Gastropoda
- Subclass: Caenogastropoda
- Order: Neogastropoda
- Superfamily: Turbinelloidea
- Family: Costellariidae
- Genus: Pacifilux; Fedosov, Bouchet, Dekkers, Gori, S.-I Huang, Kantor, Lemarcis, Marrow, Ratti, Rosenberg, R. Salisbury, Zvonareva & Puillandre, 2025

Type species
- Tiara rubra Broderip, 1836

Genus of gastropods

Pacifilux is a genus of small to medium-sized sea snails, marine gastropod molluscs in the family Costellariidae.

== Species ==
- Pacifilux andreiae (Gori & R. Salisbury, 2024)
- Pacifilux rubra (Broderip, 1836)
