= Suluspira =

Scientific classification
- Kingdom: Animalia
- Phylum: Mollusca
- Class: Gastropoda
- Subclass: Caenogastropoda
- Order: Neogastropoda
- Superfamily: Turbinelloidea
- Family: Costellariidae
- Genus: Suluspira; Fedosov, Herrmann & Bouchet, 2017

Synonyms
- Visaya Poppe, Guillot de Suduiraut & Tagaro, 2006

Genus of gastropods

Suluspira is a genus of sea snails, marine gastropod mollusks, in the family Costellariidae, the ribbed miters.

== Species ==
Species within the genus Suluspira include:

- Suluspira rosenbergi (Poppe, Guillot de Suduiraut & Tagaro, 2006)
