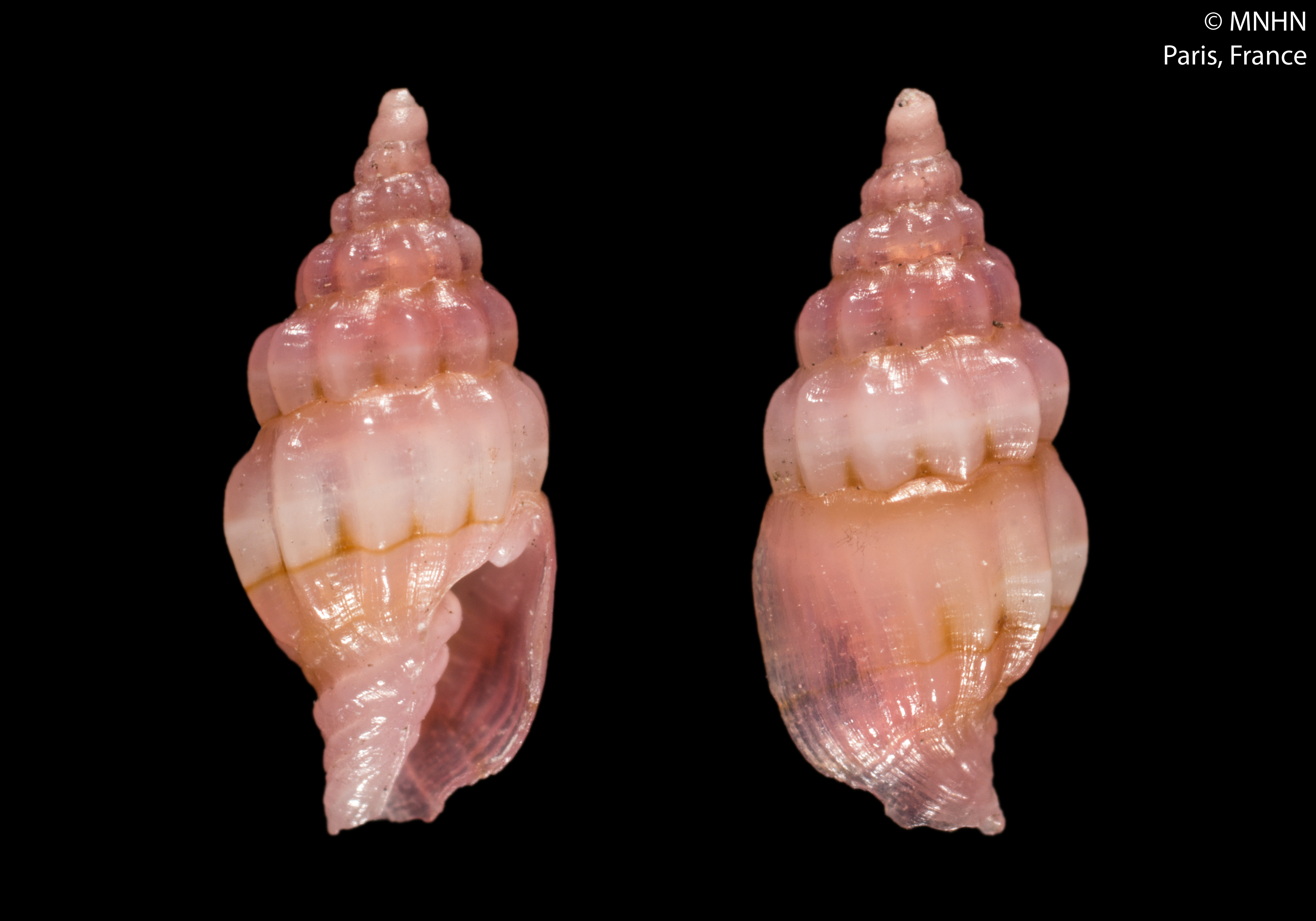
- Shell of Pacifilux rubra (lectotype at MNHN, Paris)

Scientific classification
- Kingdom: Animalia
- Phylum: Mollusca
- Class: Gastropoda
- Subclass: Caenogastropoda
- Order: Neogastropoda
- Superfamily: Turbinelloidea
- Family: Costellariidae
- Genus: Pacifilux
- Species: P. rubra

Binomial name
- Pacifilux rubra (Broderip, 1836)

Synonyms
- Atlantilux rubra (Broderip, 1836) superseded combination; Mitra (Pusia) rhodochroa Hervier, 1897; Tiara rubra Broderip, 1836; Vexillum (Pusia) rubrum (Broderip, 1836); Vexillum rhodochroa (Hervier, 1897); Vexillum rubrum (Broderip, 1836)

= Pacifilux rubra =

Species of sea snail

Pacifilux rubra is a species of sea snail, a marine gastropod mollusk, in the family Costellariidae, the ribbed miters.

== Description ==
(Original description in Latin of Tiara rubra) This minute, red-and-white banded shell is characterized by longitudinal ribbing crossed by extremely fine striations. Anatomically, it is distinguished by a slightly reflexed siphonal canal and a four-plaited columella.

== Distribution ==
This marine species occurs off New Caledonia and Queensland, Australia.
