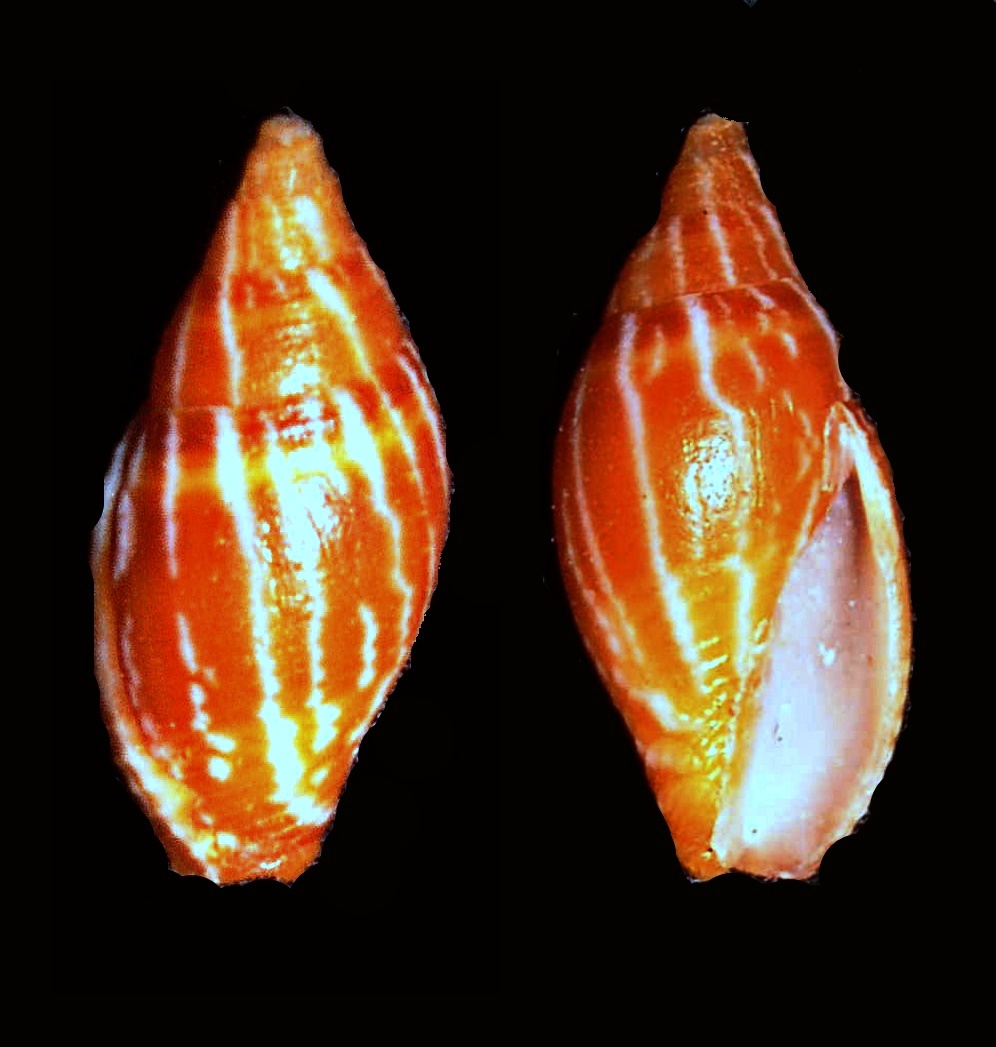
- Two shells of Vexillum consanguineum

Scientific classification
- Kingdom: Animalia
- Phylum: Mollusca
- Class: Gastropoda
- Subclass: Caenogastropoda
- Order: Neogastropoda
- Superfamily: Turbinelloidea
- Family: Costellariidae; MacDonald, 1860

Type genus
- Costellaria Swainson, 1840

Diversity
- about 640 recent species

Synonyms
- Pusiinae Habe, 1961; Vexillidae Thiele, 1929

= Costellariidae =

Family of sea snails

Costellariidae sometimes called the "ribbed miters" is a taxonomic family of minute to medium-sized predatory sea snails, marine gastropod mollusks. This family of snails is also sometimes referred to as Vexillum miters. The main family of miter shells however is Mitridae, a closely related group.

The monophyly of this family has been confirmed.

== Taxonomy ==
This family was previously sometimes known as Vexillidae.

Latiromitra (from family Ptychatractidae) has been found to be closely related to Costellariidae in the molecular phylogeny analysis by Fedosov & Kantor (2010).

== Description ==
The shell ranges from small to medium-sized, with an elongate shape that is typically fusiform, elongate-fusiform, or turriform. The protoconch is glossy and smooth, usually multispiral and narrowly conical, though it can sometimes be paucispiral and bulbous. The shell often features a high spire, a very narrow aperture, and a well-developed siphonal canal. The distinct suture is either impressed or canaliculated. The sculpture primarily consists of well-developed axial ribs, which can vary from rounded and widely spaced folds to dense, sharp ribs. While these axial ribs may become less pronounced or be overtaken by spiral elements on adult whorls, they remain prominent on earlier teleoconch whorls. The outer lip generally has three or four strong columellar folds, with the adapical fold usually being the strongest. A callus is typically present on the parietal side. There is no operculum.

Although their shape resembles that of the Mitridae, these shells are more closely related to the Muricidae.

== Distribution ==
Species of this genus are found in the tropical and temperate waters of the Indo-Pacific, usually at depths between 0 mm and 200 m.

== Genera ==
Genera within the family Costellariidae include:

- Alisimitra Fedosov, Herrmann & Bouchet, 2017
- †Antithala Harzhauser & Landau, 2021
- Atlantilux S.-I Huang, 2015
- Austromitra Finlay, 1927
- Bathythala Fedosov, Bouchet, Dekkers, Gori, S.-I Huang, Kantor, Lemarcis, Marrow, Ratti, Rosenberg, R. Salisbury, Zvonareva & Puillandre, 2025
- † Bellardithala Harzhauser & Landau, 2021
- Canaripusia Fedosov, Bouchet, Dekkers, Gori, S.-I Huang, Kantor, Lemarcis, Marrow, Ratti, Rosenberg, R. Salisbury, Zvonareva & Puillandre, 2025
- Caribbonus Fedosov, Bouchet, Dekkers, Gori, S.-I Huang, Kantor, Lemarcis, Marrow, Ratti, Rosenberg, R. Salisbury, Zvonareva & Puillandre, 2025
- Ceratoxancus Kuroda, 1952
- Cernohorskyola Fedosov, Bouchet, Dekkers, Gori, S.-I Huang, Kantor, Lemarcis, Marrow, Ratti, Rosenberg, R. Salisbury, Zvonareva & Puillandre, 2025
- Costapex Fedosov, Herrmann & Bouchet, 2017
- Ebenomitra Monterosato, 1917
- Eupusia Fedosov, Bouchet, Dekkers, Gori, S.-I Huang, Kantor, Lemarcis, Marrow, Ratti, Rosenberg, R. Salisbury, Zvonareva & Puillandre, 2025
- † Fedosovia Harzhauser & Landau, 2021
- Kilburniola Fedosov, Bouchet, Dekkers, Gori, S.-I Huang, Kantor, Lemarcis, Marrow, Ratti, Rosenberg, R. Salisbury, Zvonareva & Puillandre, 2025
- Latiromitra Locard, 1897
- Mitromica S. S. Berry, 1958
- Nodicostellaria Petuch, 1987
- Orphanopusia Fedosov, Herrmann & Bouchet, 2017
- Pacifilux Fedosov, Bouchet, Dekkers, Gori, S.-I Huang, Kantor, Lemarcis, Marrow, Ratti, Rosenberg, R. Salisbury, Zvonareva & Puillandre, 2025
- Pilgrivexillum Fedosov, Bouchet, Dekkers, Gori, S.-I Huang, Kantor, Lemarcis, Marrow, Ratti, Rosenberg, R. Salisbury, Zvonareva & Puillandre, 2025
- Ponderiola Fedosov, Bouchet, Dekkers, Gori, S.-I Huang, Kantor, Lemarcis, Marrow, Ratti, Rosenberg, R. Salisbury, Zvonareva & Puillandre, 2025
- Protoelongata Herrmann, Stossier & R. Salisbury, 2014
- Pusia Swainson, 1840 - It is either a distinct genus or a subgenus of Vexillum
- Suluspira Fedosov, Herrmann & Bouchet, 2017
- Thala H. Adams & A. Adams, 1853
- Thaluta Rosenberg & Callomon, 2003
- Tosapusia Azuma, 1965
- Turricostellaria Petuch, 1987
- Turriplicifer Fedosov, Marrow, Herrmann & Bouchet, 2017
- Vexillena Fedosov, Herrmann & Bouchet, 2017
- Vexillum Röding, 1798 - synonym: Turricula Fabricius, 1823 non Schumacher, 1817

== Synonyms ==
- Arenimitra Iredale, 1929: synonym of Vexillum Röding, 1798
- † Balcomitra H. J. Finlay, 1927: synonym of Austromitra H. J. Finlay, 1926
- Callithea Swainson, 1840: synonym of Vexillum Röding, 1798 (Invalid: junior homonym of Callithea Feisthamel, 1835; Pulchritima is a replacement name)
- Costellaria Swainson, 1840: synonym of Vexillum Röding, 1798
- Cyomesus Quinn, 1981: synonym of Latiromitra Locard, 1897 (junior subjective synonym)
- † Micromitra Bellardi, 1888 †: synonym of † Bellardithala Harzhauser & Landau, 2021 (invalid: junior homonym of Micromitra Meek, 1873 [Brachiopoda]; Bellardithala is a replacement name)
- Mitropifex Iredale, 1929: synonym of Vexillum Röding, 1798
- Okinawavoluta H. Noda, 1980: synonym of Latiromitra Locard, 1897
- Pulchritima Iredale, 1929: synonym of Vexillum Röding, 1798
- Subfamily Pusiinae Habe, 1961: synonym of Costellariidae MacDonald, 1860
- Pusiolina Cossmann, 1921 is a synonym of Pusia (Ebenomitra) Monterosato, 1917 represented as Pusia Swainson, 1840
- Tiara Swainson, 1831: synonym of Vexillum Röding, 1798
- Tongsuapusia S.-I Huang, 2015: synonym of Tosapusia M. Azuma, 1965
- Turricula H. Adams & A. Adams, 1853 (not to be confounded with Turricula Schumacher, 1817 ) : synonym of Vexillum Röding, 1798
- Uromitra Bellardi, 1887: synonym of Vexillum (Costellaria) Swainson, 1840: synonym of Vexillum Röding, 1798
- Visaya Poppe, Guillot de Suduiraut & Tagaro, 2006: synonym of Suluspira Fedosov, Herrmann & Bouchet, 2017 (invalid: junior homonym of Visaya Ahyong, 2004; Suluspira is a replacement name)
- Vulpecula Blainville, 1824: synonym of Vexillum Röding, 1798
- Zierliana Gray, 1847: synonym of Vexillum Röding, 1798

== Ecology ==
carnivorous.
