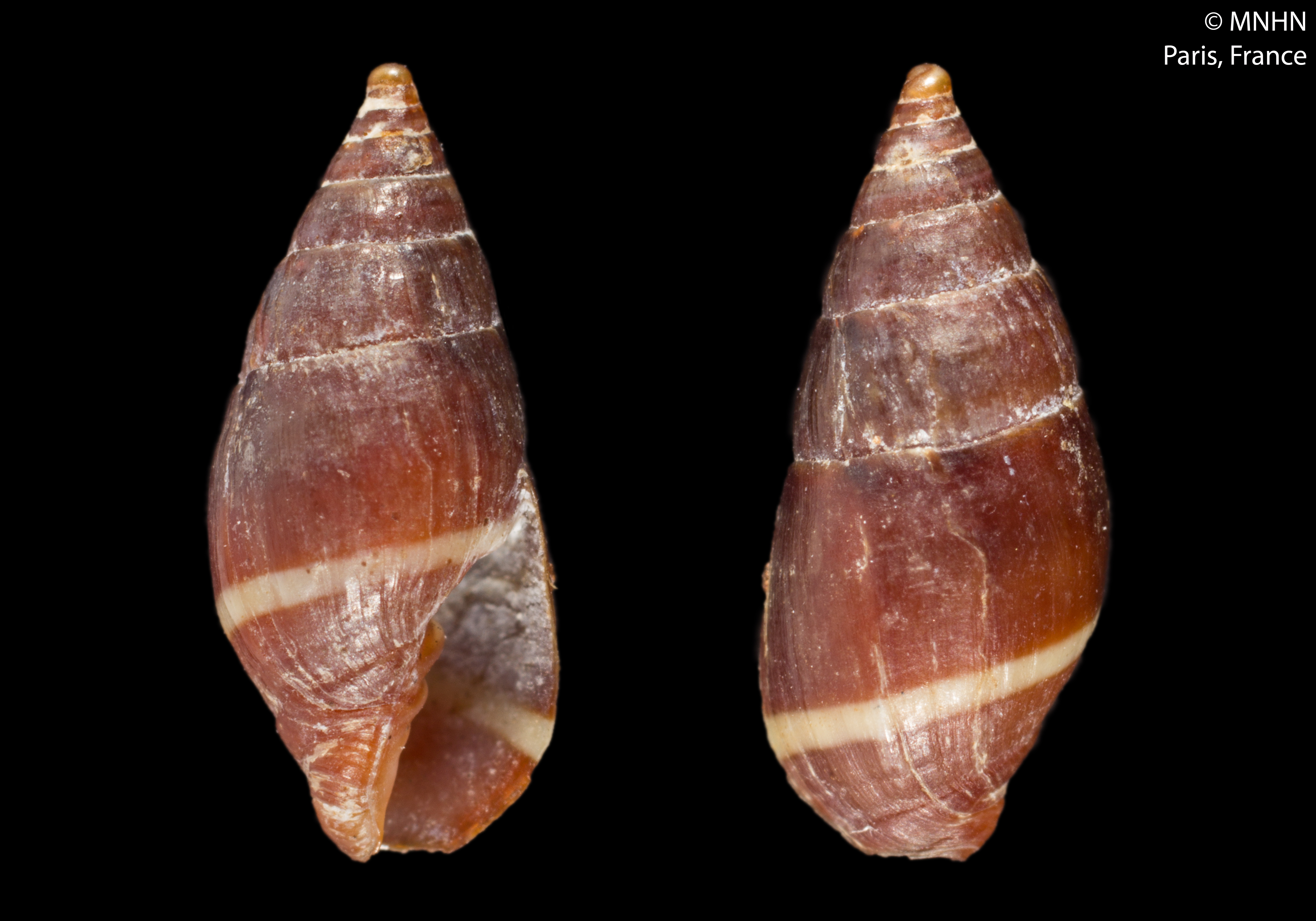
- Shell of Pusia microzonias

Scientific classification
- Kingdom: Animalia
- Phylum: Mollusca
- Class: Gastropoda
- Subclass: Caenogastropoda
- Order: Neogastropoda
- Superfamily: Turbinelloidea
- Family: Costellariidae
- Genus: Pusia; Swainson, 1840

Type species
- Mitra microzonias Lamarck, 1811

Species
- See text

Synonyms
- Ebenomitra Monterosato, 1917 · accepted, alternate representation (rank disputed); Mitra (Ebenomitra) Monterosato, 1917 · unaccepted; Mitra (Pusia) Swainson, 1840 · unaccepted; Pusia (Ebenomitra) Monterosato, 1917· accepted, alternate representation; † Pusia (Exilipusiolina) H.-J. Wang, 1982 · accepted, alternate representation; Pusia (Pusia) Swainson, 1840· accepted, alternate representation; Pusia (Vexillena) Fedosov, Herrmann & Bouchet, 2017· accepted, alternate representation; Pusiola Monterosato, 1912 (invalid: junior homonym of Pusiola Wallengren, 1863 [Lepidoptera]; Pusiolina is a replacement name); Pusiolina Cossmann, 1921 unaccepted; Tiara (Pusia) Swainson, 1840 (original rank); Turricula (Pusia) Swainson, 1840 · unaccepted; Turricula (Uromitra) Bellardi, 1887 · unaccepted; Vexillum (Pusia) Swainson, 1840 unaccepted; Vexillum (Pusiolina) Cossmann, 1921 unaccepted; Vulpecula (Pusia) Swainson, 1840 unaccepted

= Pusia =

Genus of gastropods

Pusia is a genus of sea snails, marine gastropod mollusks in the family Costellariidae.

== Species ==
Species within the genus Pusia include:

- Pusia alarum S.-I Huang, 2023
- Pusia anabelae F. Fernandes, 1992
- † Pusia ardjunoi Beets, 1941
- Pusia articulata (Reeve, 1845)
- † Pusia aturensis Lozouet, 2021
- Pusia aurae S.-I Huang, 2023
- † Pusia avellana (Bellardi, 1887)
- † Pusia avellanella (Boettger, 1906)
- † Pusia baluki Landau, Harzhauser, İslamoğlu & C. M. Silva, 2013
- † Pusia brevior (Friedberg, 1911)
- † Pusia cheribonensis (K. Martin, 1895)
- Pusia chickcharneora (W. G. Lyons & Kaicher, 1978)
- † Pusia cognata (Bellardi, 1887)
- † Pusia confunda Harzhauser & Landau, 2021
- † Pusia conoidea C.-H. Hu & X.-F. Lee, 1991
- † Pusia crassiornata Biskupič & Z. Kovács, 2025
- Pusia cubana (Aguayo & Rehder, 1936)
- Pusia dahlia Fedosov, Bouchet, Dekkers, Gori, S.-I Huang, Kantor, Lemarcis, Marrow, Ratti, Rosenberg, R. Salisbury, Zvonareva & Puillandre, 2025
- † Pusia degrangei (Peyrot, 1928)
- Pusia dermestina (Lamarck, 1811)
- † Pusia druyvesteyni (Koperberg, 1931)
- † Pusia emmae (Yokoyama, 1920)
- Pusia epiphanea Rehder, 1943
- † Pusia escheri Beets, 1941
- Pusia exigua (C. B. Adams, 1845)
- † Pusia falsitranssylvanica Harzhauser & Landau, 2021
- Pusia hansenae (Cernohorsky, 1973)
- † Pusia hastata (Karsten, 1849)
- Pusia hendersoni (Dall, 1927)
- Pusia histrio (Reeve, 1844)
- Pusia hutia Fedosov, Bouchet, Dekkers, Gori, S.-I Huang, Kantor, Lemarcis, Marrow, Ratti, Rosenberg, R. Salisbury, Zvonareva & Puillandre, 2025
- Pusia hypatiae (Pallary, 1912)
- Pusia ivanmarrowi Marrow, 2017
- Pusia marrowi (Cernohorsky, 1973)
- † Pusia meganodosa MacNeil, 1961 †
- † Pusia menkrawitensis Beets, 1941
- † Pusia micra H.-J. Wang, 1982
- Pusia microzonias (Lamarck, 1811)
- Pusia monilifera (C. B. Adams, 1850)
- † Pusia moravica (R. Hoernes & Auinger, 1880)
- † Pusia multicostata H.-J. Wang, 1982 (homonym of Pusia multicostata (Broderip, 1836), synonym of Vexillum multicostatum (Broderip, 1836) )
- † Pusia oorti (Koperberg, 1931)
- † Pusia palmulleri Biskupič & Z. Kovács, 2025
- Pusia paolinii Gori, Rosado & R. Salisbury, 2019
- †Pusia paraleucozona (Boettger, 1906)
- † Pusia pseudomoravica Biskupič & Z. Kovács, 2025
- † Pusia pseudorecticosta (O. Boettger, 1906)
- Pusia pulchella (Reeve, 1844)
- † Pusia pyrenaica (Peyrot, 1928)
- Pusia quokka Marrow, 2024
- Pusia savellii Poppe & Tagaro, 2026
- † Pusia schafferi (Csepreghy-Meznerics, 1933)
- † Pusia semiplicata (Peyrot, 1928)
- Pusia simoneae Marrow, 2017
- † Pusia subpyrenaica Lozouet, 2021
- Pusia trophonia (Dall, 1889)
- Pusia variata (Reeve, 1845)
- Pusia versicolor Marrow, 2017
- † Pusia vexans (O. Boettger, 1902)
- † Pusia virodunensis Lozouet, 2021
- Pusia voluta Marrow, 2017
- Pusia zebrina (d'Orbigny, 1840)

== Synonyms ==
- Pusia amabilis: synonym of Vexillum (Pusia) amabile (Reeve, 1845)
- Pusia angeloamatii Amati, 2024: synonym of Ebenomitra angeloamatii (Amati, 2024)
- Pusia aureolata: synonym of Vexillum (Pusia) aureolatum (Reeve, 1844)
- Pusia balutensis (Herrmann, 2009): synonym of Vexillena balutensis (Herrmann, 2009)
- Pusia bernhardina (Röding, 1798): synonym of Condylomitra bernhardina (Röding, 1798)
- Pusia bibsae (Nowell-Usticke, 1969): synonym of Vexillum catenatum (Broderip, 1836)
- Pusia callipicta Sarasúa, 1978: synonym of Vexillum articulatum (Reeve, 1845) (junior secondary homonym of Vexillum callipictum Woodring, 1928: Vexillum (Pusia) josefinae Sarasúa, 1985 is a replacement name)
- Pusia cancellaroides( Anton, 1838): synonym of Vexillum (Pusia) cancellarioides (Anton, 1838)
- Pusia chibaensis Salisbury & Rosenberg, 1999: synonym of Vexillum (Pusia) chibaense (Salisbury & Rosenberg, 1999)
- Pusia choslenae (Cernohorsky, 1982): synonym of Vexillena choslenae (Cernohorsky, 1982)
- Pusia crocata (Lamarck, 1811): synonym of Vexillum (Pusia) crocatum (Lamarck, 1811)
- Pusia dautzenbergi (Poppe, Guillot de Suduiraut & Tagaro, 2006): synonym of Vexillena dautzenbergi (Poppe, E. Guillot de Suduiraut & Tagaro, 2006)
- Pusia ebenus (Lamarck, 1811): synonym of Ebenomitra ebenus (Lamarck, 1811)
- Pusia elliscrossi (Rosenberg & R. Salisbury, 1991): synonym of Vexillena elliscrossi (Rosenberg & R. Salisbury, 1991)
- Pusia epiphanea Rehder, 1943: synonym of Vexillum epiphaneum (Rehder, 1943) (original combination)
- Pusia gemmata (G. B. Sowerby II, 1874): synonym of Atlantilux gemmata (G. B. Sowerby II, 1874)
- Pusia granum (Forbes, 1844): synonym of Ebenomitra granum (Forbes, 1844)
- Pusia jenyai Fedosov, Herrmann & Bouchet, 2017: synonym of Vexillena jenyai (Fedosov, Herrmann & Bouchet, 2017)
- Pusia johnwolffi (Herrmann & R. Salisbury, 2012): synonym of Vexillena johnwolffi (Herrmann & R. Salisbury, 2012)
- Pusia karpathoensis Nordsieck, 1969 : synonym of Mitromorpha karpathoensis (Nordsieck, 1969)
- Pusia lauta (Reeve, 1845): synonym of Eupusia lauta (Reeve, 1845)
- † Pusia leucozona (Andrzejowski, 1830): synonym of † Ebenomitra leucozona (Andrzejowski, 1830) (superseded combination)
- Pusia multicostata: synonym of Vexillum (Pusia) multicostatum (Broderip, 1836)
- Pusia muriculata: synonym of Mitra (Nebularia) bernhardina (Röding, 1798)
- Pusia nodulita Sarasúa, 1978: synonym of Vexillum catenatum (Broderip, 1836)
- Pusia osiridis (Issel, 1869): synonym of Orphanopusia osiridis (Issel, 1869)
- Pusia pardalis: synonym of Vexillum (Pusia) pardale (Küster, 1840)
- Pusia patula (Reeve, 1845): synonym of Vexillum patulum (Reeve, 1845)
- Pusia sagamiensis Kuroda & Habe, 1971: synonym of Vexillum castum (H. Adams, 1872): synonym of Pilgrivexillum sagamiense (Kuroda & T. Habe, 1971)
- Pusia savignyi (Payraudeau, 1826): synonym of Ebenomitra savignyi (Payraudeau, 1826)
- Pusia splendidula Sarasúa, 1975: synonym of Vexillum variatum (Reeve, 1845)
- † Pusia transsylvanica (Boettger, 1902): synonym of † Pusia falsitranssylvanica Harzhauser & Landau, 2021 (unaccepted > junior homonym, junior homonym of Mitra transsylvanica Hoernes & Auinger 1880; Pusia falsitranssylvanica is a replacement name)
- Pusia tricolor (Gmelin, 1791): synonym of Ebenomitra tricolor (Gmelin, 1791) (superseded combination)
- Pusia tuberosa: synonym of Mitra tuberosa Reeve, 1845
- Pusia vassardi Fedosov, Herrmann & Bouchet, 2017: synonym of Eupusia vassardi (Fedosov, Herrmann & Bouchet, 2017)
- Pusia venusta Sarasúa, 1978: synonym of Vexillum pulchellum (Reeve, 1844)
- Pusia vicmanoui (H. Turner & Marrow, 2001): synonym of Vexillena vicmanoui (H. Turner & Marrow, 2001)
- Pusia voncoseli Poppe, Tagaro & Salisbury, 2009:synonym of Vexillum voncoseli (Poppe, Tagaro & R. Salisbury, 2009
