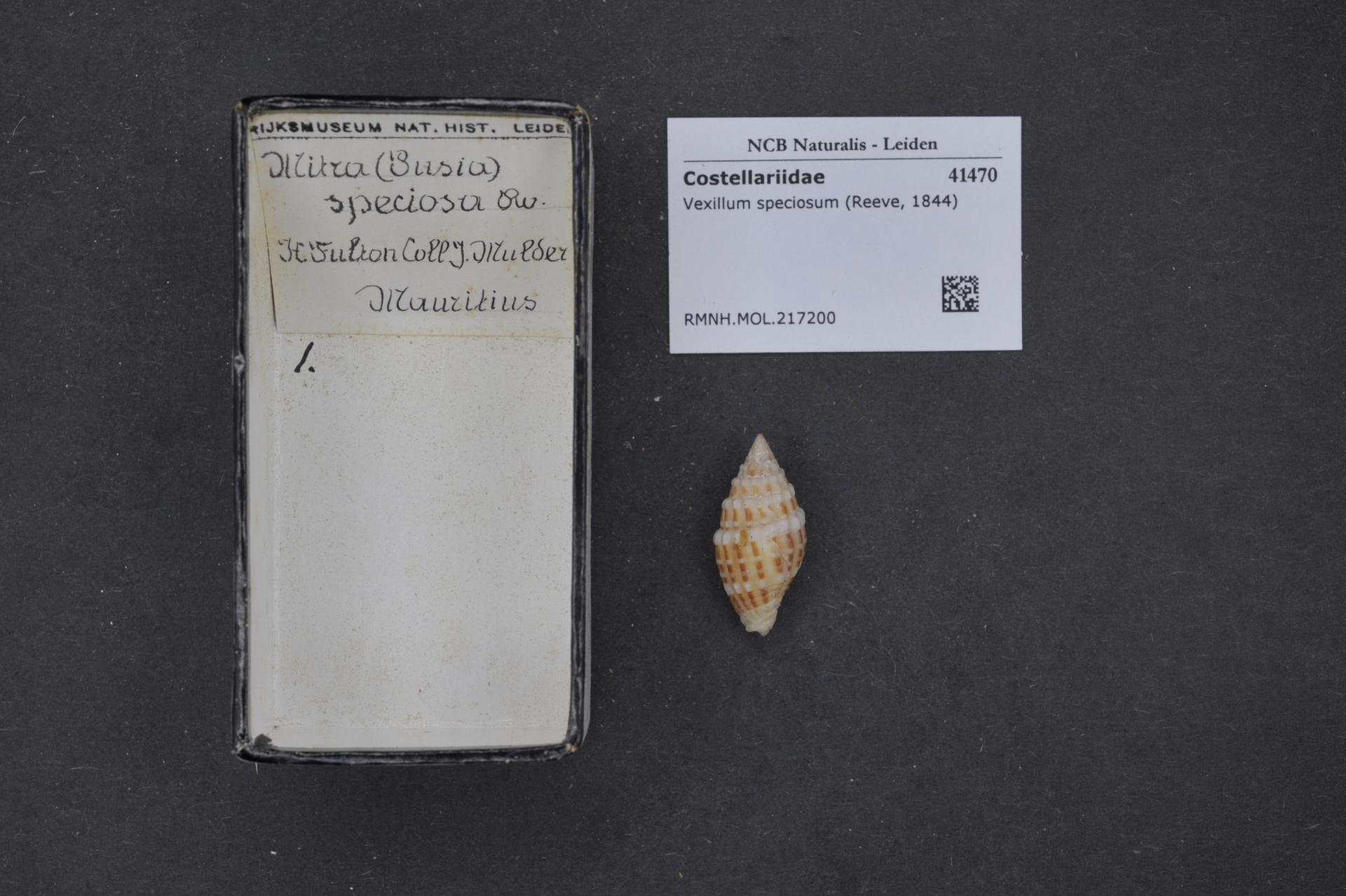
- Shell of Vexillum speciosum (specimen at Naturalis Biodiversity Center)

Scientific classification
- Kingdom: Animalia
- Phylum: Mollusca
- Class: Gastropoda
- Subclass: Caenogastropoda
- Order: Neogastropoda
- Superfamily: Turbinelloidea
- Family: Costellariidae
- Genus: Vexillum
- Species: V. speciosum

Binomial name
- Vexillum speciosum (Reeve, 1844)

Synonyms
- Mitra speciosa Reeve, 1844; Mitra pusio Philippi, R.A., 1850; Pusia pusio (L.A. Reeve, 1844); Pusia trizonalis (L.A. Reeve, 1844); Vexillum trizonalis Dautzenberg, Ph., 1935

= Vexillum speciosum =

Species of gastropod

Vexillum speciosum, common name : the specious mitre, is a species of small sea snail, marine gastropod mollusk in the family Costellariidae, the ribbed miters.

== Description ==
The shell size varies between 15 mm and 22 mm.

(Original description) The shell is stoutly ovate, attenuated at both ends. It is transversely impressly striated and longitudinally ribbed, the ribs rather flat, granulated towards the base. The shel lis pinkish white, ribs stained with a very broad brown or purple-brown band, the apex pink. The columella is four-plaited, uppermost plate much the largest.

This shell, at first glance, has very much the appearance of Vexillum pulchellum, but upon closer examination it will be observed that the dark band which encircles the one is painted on the ribs only, whilst in the other it appears in the interstices only.

== Distribution ==
This species occurs in the Indian Ocean off Mozambique, Réunion, Mauritius, Chagos and the Mascarene basin; also off the Philippines, Hawaii, Tuamotu Archipelago and Australia (Northern Territory, Queensland, Western Australia).
