= Pusia monilifera =

Scientific classification
- Kingdom: Animalia
- Phylum: Mollusca
- Class: Gastropoda
- Subclass: Caenogastropoda
- Order: Neogastropoda
- Superfamily: Turbinelloidea
- Family: Costellariidae
- Genus: Pusia
- Species: P. monilifera

Binomial name
- Pusia monilifera (C. B. Adams, 1850)

Synonyms
- Mitra monilifera C. B. Adams, 1850 · unaccepted (original combination); Vexillum moniliferum (C. B. Adams, 1850); Vexillum (Pusia) moniliferum (C. B. Adams, 1850) ·

Species of gastropod

Pusia monilifera is a species of small sea snail, marine gastropod mollusk in the family Costellariidae, the ribbed miters.

== Description ==
The length of the shell attains 4.32 mm, its diameter 2.79 mm.

(Original description) The shape of the shell is somewhere between a fusiform and rhomboidal. The shell is brownish black, with a white spiral band which is a little above the suture, and which is small and indistinct on the upper whorls and increases with the progress of growth, and which is dilated into spots on the ribs. The shell has rather acute longitudinal ribs, about fourteen on each whorl, and numerous excessively minute unequal raised spiral lines, which are larger at the anterior extemity, and more nodulous on the ribs. They have anteriorly a broad well impressed groove, which commences in the aperture above the plaits, and contracts the general form. The apex is acute. The spire shows nearly rectilinear outlines. The contains eight or nine whorls, rather convex, with a rather deep suture. The columella has four plaits.

== Distribution ==
This marine species occurs off Jamaica.
