= Pusia quokka =

Scientific classification
- Kingdom: Animalia
- Phylum: Mollusca
- Class: Gastropoda
- Subclass: Caenogastropoda
- Order: Neogastropoda
- Family: Costellariidae
- Genus: Pusia
- Species: P. quokka

Binomial name
- Pusia quokka Marrow, 2024

Species of gastropod

Pusia quokka is a species of small sea snail, marine gastropod mollusk in the family Costellariidae, also known as the ribbed miters.

== Distribution ==
This species is endemic to Australia and occurs in Western Australia.
