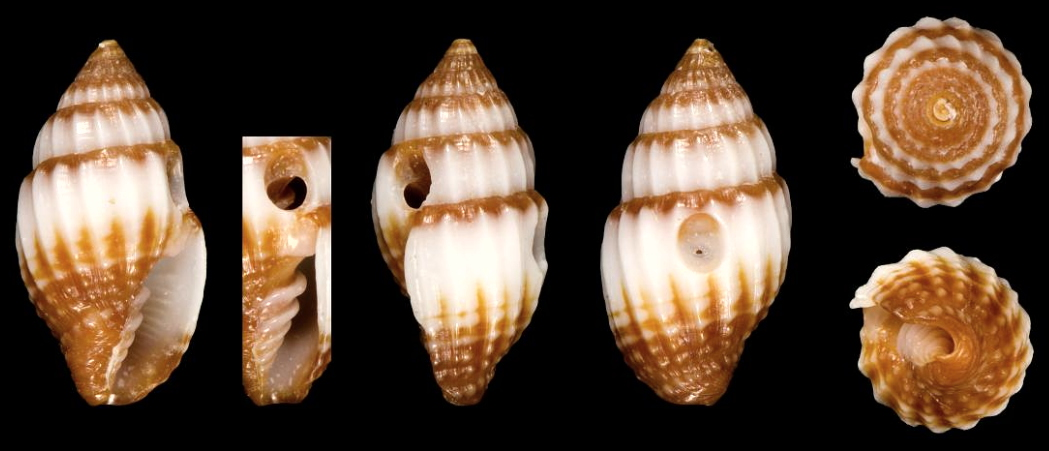
- Shell of Pusia chickcharneora (holotype at the Smithsonian Institution)

Scientific classification
- Kingdom: Animalia
- Phylum: Mollusca
- Class: Gastropoda
- Subclass: Caenogastropoda
- Order: Neogastropoda
- Family: Costellariidae
- Genus: Pusia
- Species: P. chickcharneora

Binomial name
- Pusia chickcharneora (Lyons & Kaicher, 1978)

Synonyms
- Vexillum chickcharneorum W.G. Lyons & S.D. Kaicher, 1978; Vexillum (Pusia) chickcharneorum Lyons & Kaicher, 1978

= Pusia chickcharneora =

Species of gastropod

Pusia chickcharneora is a species of small sea snail, marine gastropod mollusk in the family Costellariidae, the ribbed miters.

== Description ==
The length of the shell attains 9.4 mm.

== Distribution ==
This marine species occurs off the Bahamas.
