= Orphanopusia festa =

Scientific classification
- Kingdom: Animalia
- Phylum: Mollusca
- Class: Gastropoda
- Subclass: Caenogastropoda
- Order: Neogastropoda
- Superfamily: Turbinelloidea
- Family: Costellariidae
- Genus: Orphanopusia
- Species: O. festa

Binomial name
- Orphanopusia festa (Reeve, 1845)

Synonyms
- Mitra festa Reeve, 1845 (original combination); Vexillum (Pusia) festum (Reeve, 1845) ·; Vexillum festum (Reeve, 1845) superseded combination

Species of gastropod

Orphanopusia festa, common name the pleasant mitre, is a species of small sea snail, marine gastropod mollusk in the family Costellariidae, the ribbed miters.

== Description ==
(Original description) The shell is pyramidally ovate, longitudinally obtusely ribbed. The interstices between the ribs are transversely cancellated. The shell is ivory-white. The body whorl is encircled with a broad olive-ash belt, indistinctly dotted with white. The columella is four-plaited.

== Distribution ==
This marine species occurs off the Philippines.
