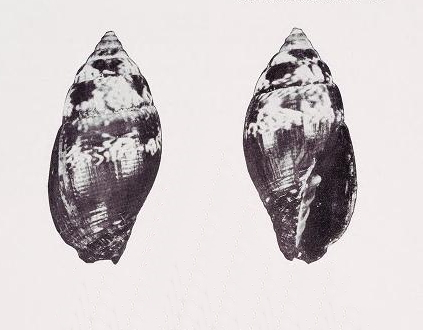
- Shell of Pusia marrowi (holotype)

Scientific classification
- Kingdom: Animalia
- Phylum: Mollusca
- Class: Gastropoda
- Subclass: Caenogastropoda
- Order: Neogastropoda
- Superfamily: Turbinelloidea
- Family: Costellariidae
- Genus: Pusia
- Species: P. marrowi

Binomial name
- Pusia marrowi (Cernohorsky, 1973)

Synonyms
- Pusia (Pusia) marrowi (Cernohorsky, 1973); Vexillum (Pusia) marrowi Cernohorsky, 1973; Vexillum marrowi Cernohorsky, 1973

= Pusia marrowi =

Species of gastropod

Pusia marrowi is a species of sea snail, a marine gastropod mollusk, in the family Costellariidae, the ribbed miters.

== Description ==
(Original description) The shell is small, measuring between 7.0 mm and 21.0 mm in length. It is generally ovate or occasionally elongate-ovate in form and is notably solid. The coloration ranges from brown to purplish-brown, and the shell is ornamented with an irregular, white presutural transverse band along with small or large white flecks. Within the aperture, the color is brown near the edge of the outer lip, transitioning to violet or purplish deeper inside. The parietal wall is brown, while the columellar folds appear bluish-white or violet.

The teleoconch consists of 4 to 6 short, convex whorls, and the protoconch is composed of 1.25 to 2.25 smooth nuclear whorls. The sutures are sharply incised and distinct. The surface is sculptured with slender and occasionally angulate axial ribs, which number between 15 and 28 on the penultimate whorl and 1 to 20 on the body whorl.

Additionally, slender and often flattened, irregular spiral striae encircle the whorls; these number 5 to 14 on the penultimate whorl and 8 to 17 on the body whorl, in addition to 7 to 13 oblique basal cords. The interstices of the spiral cords are minutely punctate, which gives the impression that they are finely striate.

The aperture is longer than the spire, remains moderately wide, and is lirate within. The outer lip is convex and becomes constricted anteriorly. While the parietal wall is glazed, the lower half of the columella is calloused and features four distinct, oblique folds. Finally, the siphonal canal is straight and short, terminating in a distinct but moderately shallow siphonal notch.

== Distribution ==
This marine species is endemic to Australia and occurs off Western Australia.
