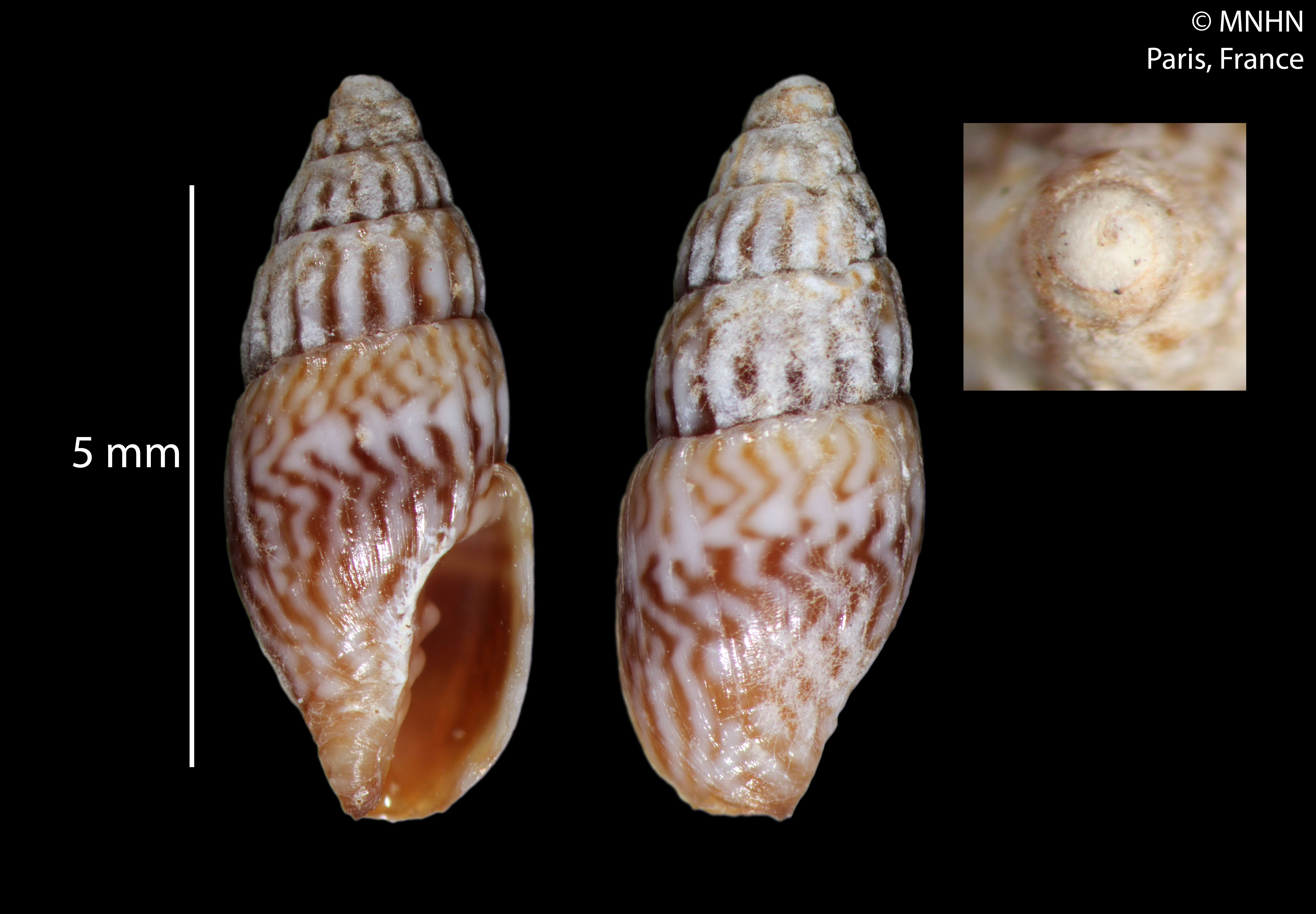
- Shell of Pusia zebrina (paratype at MNHN, Paris)

Scientific classification
- Kingdom: Animalia
- Phylum: Mollusca
- Class: Gastropoda
- Subclass: Caenogastropoda
- Order: Neogastropoda
- Family: Costellariidae
- Genus: Pusia
- Species: P. zebrina

Binomial name
- Pusia zebrina (d'Orbigny in Webb & Berthelot, 1839)

Synonyms
- Mitra capillata Gould, 1850; Mitra semen Reeve, 1845; Mitra zebrina d'Orbigny, 1840 (original combination); Strigatella georgi F. Nordsieck, 1975; Vexillum (Pusia) zebrinum (d'Orbigny, 1840); Vexillum zebrinum (d'Orbigny, 1840)

= Pusia zebrina =

Species of gastropod

Pusia zebrina is a species of small sea snail, marine gastropod mollusk in the family Costellariidae, the ribbed miters.

== Description ==
The length of the shell attains 14 mm.

(Original description in French) The shell is oblong and slightly elongated, with a smooth surface throughout except near the siphonal canal. In that area, one can observe about ten striae, in the middle of which an obtuse ridge appears, corresponding to the large tooth on the columella. The spire is elongated and conical, composed of six slightly convex whorls that are barely separated by a faint suture. The aperture is very narrow and is marked by three folds on the columella, followed by a callosity on the side of the spire. The outer lip is thickened and adorned with numerous protruding teeth; the tooth closest to the spire is the largest and is distinguished from the others by its prominent projection.

The shell is entirely a chestnut-brown tint with a slight violet hue. This color becomes paler at the suture and the aperture, where small, equally spaced whitish lines wave longitudinally in a fairly regular pattern.

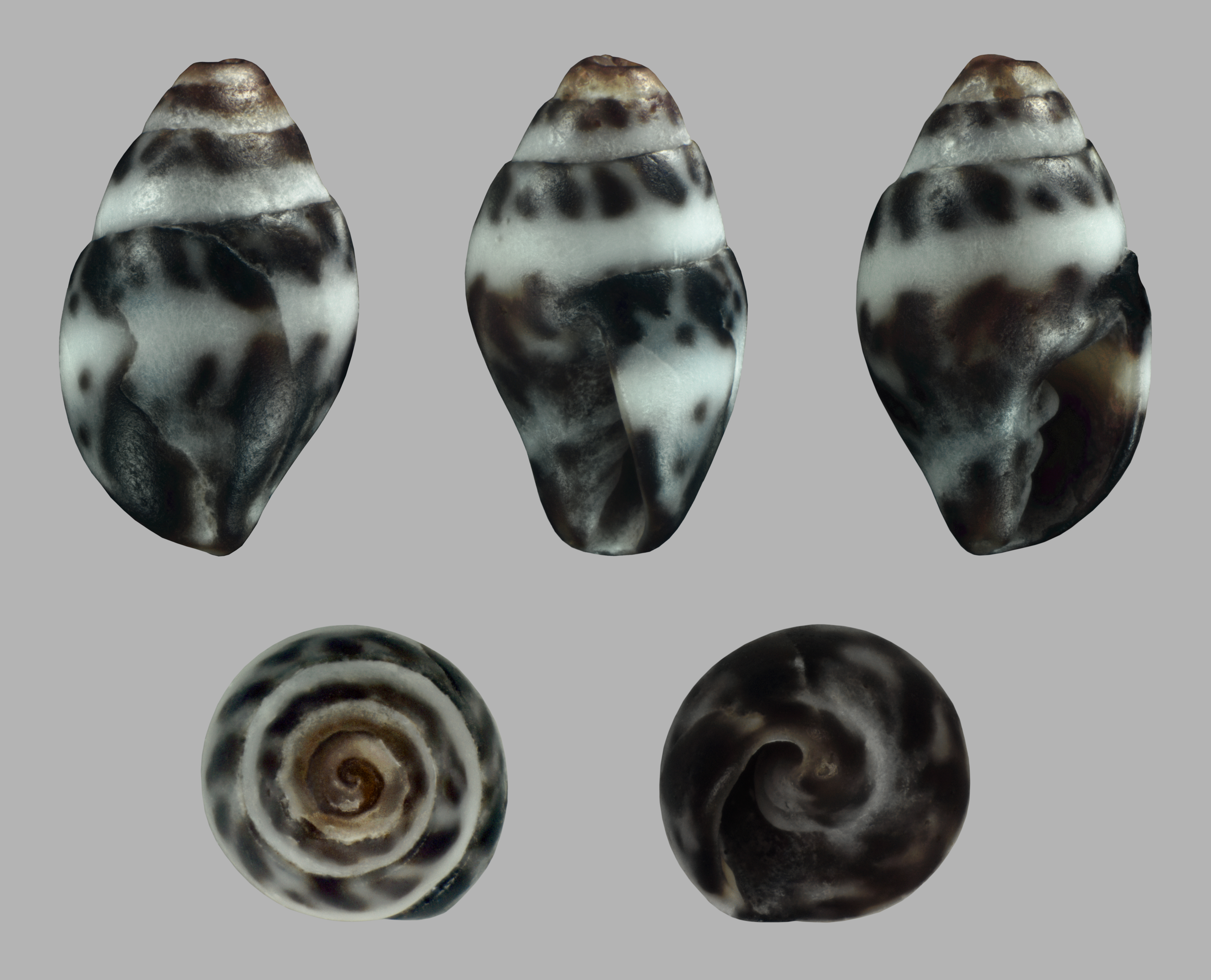
Spotted form

Striped form

== Distribution ==
This marine species occurs off the Canary Islands and Morocco.
