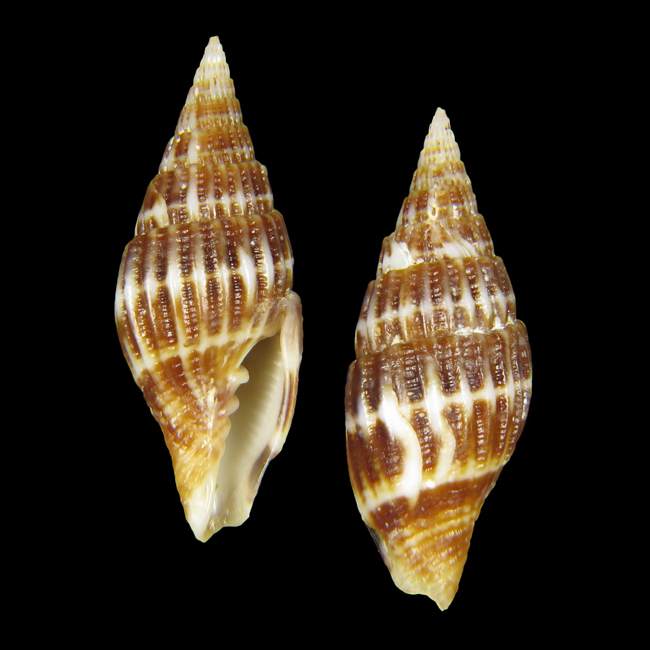
- Shell of Vexillena dautzenbergi

Scientific classification
- Kingdom: Animalia
- Phylum: Mollusca
- Class: Gastropoda
- Subclass: Caenogastropoda
- Order: Neogastropoda
- Superfamily: Turbinelloidea
- Family: Costellariidae
- Genus: Vexillena; Fedosov, Herrmann & Bouchet, 2017

Type species
- Vexillum (Costellaria) balutense Herrmann, 2009

Species
- See text

Synonyms
- Pusia (Vexillena) Fedosov, Herrmann & Bouchet, 2017 superseded rank

= Vexillena =

Genus of gastropods

Vexillena is a genus of sea snails, marine gastropod mollusks in the family Costellariidae.

== Species ==
- Vexillena balutensis (Herrmann, 2009)
- Vexillena choslenae (Cernohorsky, 1982)
- Vexillena dautzenbergi (Poppe, E. Guillot de Suduiraut & Tagaro, 2006)
- Vexillena elliscrossi (Rosenberg & R. Salisbury, 1991)
- Vexillena jenyai (Fedosov, Herrmann & Bouchet, 2017)
- Vexillena johnwolffi (Herrmann & R. Salisbury, 2012)
- Vexillena vicmanoui (H. Turner & Marrow, 2001)
