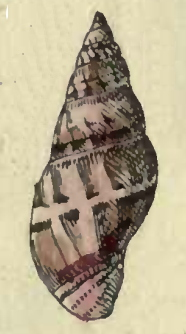
- Drawing of a shell of Pusia articulata

Scientific classification
- Kingdom: Animalia
- Phylum: Mollusca
- Class: Gastropoda
- Subclass: Caenogastropoda
- Order: Neogastropoda
- Superfamily: Turbinelloidea
- Family: Costellariidae
- Genus: Pusia
- Species: P. articulata

Binomial name
- Pusia articulata (Reeve, 1845)

Synonyms
- Mitra articulata Reeve, 1845; Pusia callipicta Sarasúa, 1978 (junior secondary homonym of Vexillum callipictum Woodring, 1928: Vexillum (Pusia) josefinae Sarasúa, 1985 is a replacement name); Vexillum (Pusia) articulatum (Reeve, 1845); Vexillum (Pusia) josefinae Sarasúa, 1985; Vexillum (Pusiolina) arestum Rehder, 1943; Vexillum arestum (Rehder, 1943); Vexillum articulatum (Reeve, 1845) superseded combination

= Pusia articulata =

Species of gastropod

Pusia articulata, common name the articulated mitre, is a species of small sea snail, marine gastropod mollusk in the family Costellariidae, the ribbed miters.

== Description ==
The length of the shell attains 11.4 mm.

(Original description) The shell is shortly fusiform and somewhat ventricose. The whorls are smooth, longitudinally rather obsoletely plicated, slightly tubercled in the middle. The shell is pale pinkish scarlet, encircled with a small white brown-articulated zone. The columella is four-plaited.

The shell is pale pinkish scarlet, encircled with a small white brown articulated zone.

== Distribution ==
This species occurs in the Gulf of Mexico off Louisiana.
