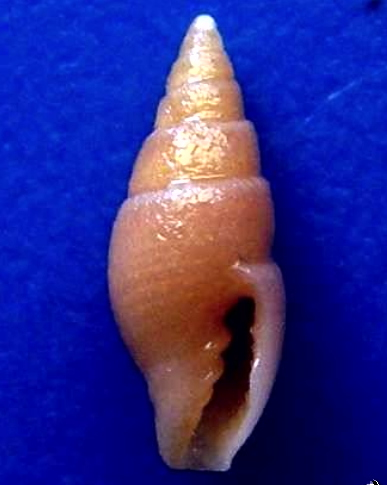
- Shell of Pusia hypatiae

Scientific classification
- Kingdom: Animalia
- Phylum: Mollusca
- Class: Gastropoda
- Subclass: Caenogastropoda
- Order: Neogastropoda
- Family: Costellariidae
- Genus: Pusia
- Species: P. hypatiae

Binomial name
- Pusia hypatiae (Pallary, 1913)

Synonyms
- Uromitra hypatiae Pallary, 1912; Vexillum haifensis (P.M. Pallary, 1912); Vexillum hypatiae (Pallary, 1912) superseded combination

= Pusia hypatiae =

Species of gastropod

Pusia hypatiae is a species of small sea snail, marine gastropod mollusk in the family Costellariidae, the ribbed miters.

== Description ==
The length of the shell attains 9 mm, its diameter 3 mm.

(Original description in Latin) The shell is glossy and elongated. The whorls are slightly convex and somewhat stepped, and they are ornamented with extremely fine longitudinal striae, which are visible only under a lens (to the unaided eye, the surface appears smooth and shiny). The columella bears three folds at the base. The outer lip is internally folded. The color of the shell is brown.

== Distribution ==
This marine species occurs off Turkey and Egypt.
