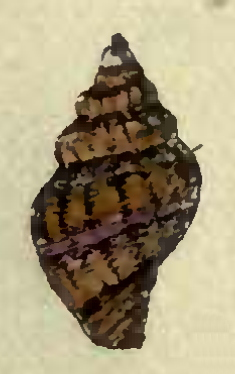
- Drawing of a shell of Pusia histrio

Scientific classification
- Kingdom: Animalia
- Phylum: Mollusca
- Class: Gastropoda
- Subclass: Caenogastropoda
- Order: Neogastropoda
- Superfamily: Turbinelloidea
- Family: Costellariidae
- Genus: Pusia
- Species: P. histrio

Binomial name
- Pusia histrio (Reeve, 1844)

Synonyms
- Mitra ansulata Sowerby II & Sowerby III, 1874; Mitra hayesae Nowell-Usticke, 1959 junior subjective synonym; Mitra histrio Reeve, 1844 (original combination); Vexillum (Pusia) histrio (Reeve, 1844); Vexillum histrio (Reeve, 1844) superseded combination

= Pusia histrio =

Species of gastropod

Pusia histrio, common name the harlequin miter, is a species of small sea snail, a marine gastropod mollusk in the family Costellariidae, the ribbed miters.

== Description ==
The length of the shell attains 19 mm.

(Original description) The ovate shell has a short spire. It is longitudinally ribbed with the ribs rather obtuse and granulated towards the base. The interstices are transversely striated. The shell is bright scarlet, the sutures are black, sometimes clouded with black, encircled with a narrow black and a white belt. The columella is four-plaited.

(Described as Mitra ansulata) The shell is somewhat truncated, brown and smooth. The obtuse spire is as long as the aperture. The whorls are obtusely angular and ornamented with a chain-like row of oval white spots.

== Distribution ==
This species occurs in the western Atlantic Ocean.
