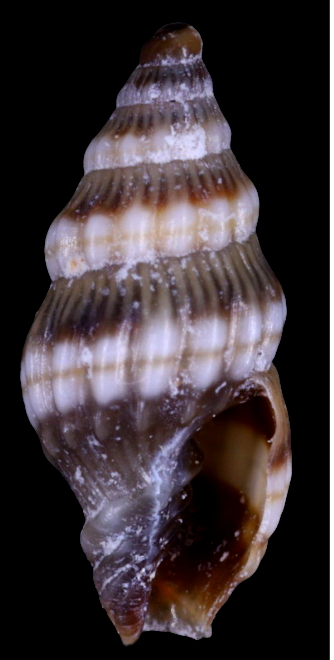
- Shell of Pusia exigua (specimen at MNHN, Paris)

Scientific classification
- Kingdom: Animalia
- Phylum: Mollusca
- Class: Gastropoda
- Subclass: Caenogastropoda
- Order: Neogastropoda
- Superfamily: Turbinelloidea
- Family: Costellariidae
- Genus: Pusia
- Species: P. exigua

Binomial name
- Pusia exigua (C. B. Adams, 1845)

Synonyms
- Atlantilux exigua (C. B. Adams, 1845) superseded combination; Mitra antiguaensis Nowell-Usticke, 1971; Mitra exigua C. B. Adams, 1845; Mitra hanleyi Dohrn, 1862 (not G.B. Sowerby II, 1874); Mitra minutus Nowell-Usticke, 1969 junior subjective synonym; Mitra roseocaudata G. B. Sowerby II, 1874; Vexillum (Pusia) exiguum (C. B. Adams, 1845); Vexillum exiguum (C. B. Adams, 1845); Vexillum hanleyi (Dohrn, 1862)

= Pusia exigua =

Species of gastropod

Pusia exigua is a species of sea snail, a marine gastropod mollusk, in the family Costellariidae, the ribbed miters.

It was classified by C. B. Adams in 1845.

== Description ==
(Original description in Latin) The shell is very small, possessing an oval-elongated shape and a whitish color. It consists of six whorls, which are structured with numerous small ribs on the upper portion and broad ribs on the lower portion.

The upper parts of the whorls are a dark, blackish-purple, while the lower parts are spotted with brown. The body whorl is sculpted on its lower half in the same manner as the upper half. The siphonal canal is notably short.

Dimensions: Total Length: 0.13 in (approx. 3.3 mm); spire Length: 0.075 in (approx. 1.9 mm).

== Distribution ==
This species occurs in the Caribbean Sea off Jamaica and Guadeloupe.
