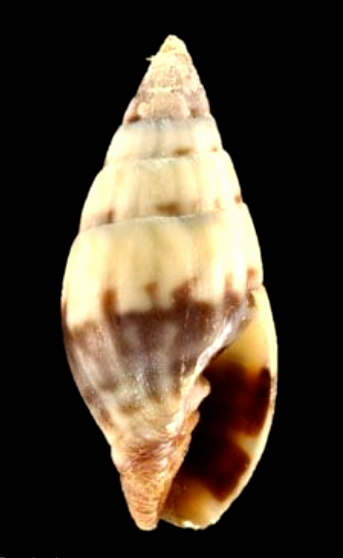
- Shell of Pusia hansenae (specimen at the Natural History Museum Rotterdam)

Scientific classification
- Kingdom: Animalia
- Phylum: Mollusca
- Class: Gastropoda
- Subclass: Caenogastropoda
- Order: Neogastropoda
- Superfamily: Turbinelloidea
- Family: Costellariidae
- Genus: Pusia
- Species: P. hansenae

Binomial name
- Pusia hansenae (Cernohorsky, 1973)

Synonyms
- Pusia (Pusia) hansenae (Cernohorsky, 1973); Vexillum (Pusia) hansenae Cernohorsky, 1973; Vexillum hansenae Cernohorsky, 1973

= Pusia hansenae =

Species of gastropod

Pusia hansenae is a species of sea snail, a marine gastropod mollusk, in the family Costellariidae, the ribbed miters.

== Description ==
The length of the shell varies between 6 mm and 21 mm.

(Original description) The shell is variable in form, appearing either ovate or fusiformly-elongate, and is notably solid in its construction. The base color varies from bluish-white to steel-grey. The spire whorls are show at the sutures a turret-like, dark olive-green narrow band, which appears as a series of small quadrate spots. The lower two-thirds of the body whorl are dark olive-green, though this area is interrupted in places by narrow, broken bluish-white bands of the protruding base color. At the periphery, the dark olive-green zone features a turret-like border.

The aperture is greenish-brown and is occasionally cream-banded. While the columellar folds are white or grey, the parietal wall is dark olive-green. The teleoconch consists of 4 to 6 convex whorls, and the protoconch is composed of 1 to 1.5 smooth and slightly globose nuclear whorls.

The surface is sculptured with broad, irregular, and ill-developed flattish axial folds. These folds number between 12 and 21 on the penultimate whorl and 2 to 15 on the body whorl. Although the spiral sculpture is not visible to the naked eye, the base of the body whorl possesses 6 to 14 oblique spiral cords. The sutures are narrowly incised.

The aperture is narrow and is equal in height to, or slightly longer than, the spire. It is lirate within, though these lirae are occasionally obsolete. The outer lip is moderately thickened, simple, and regularly convex. The columella is only thinly glazed and is equipped with four prominent, oblique folds that decrease in size toward the anterior. Finally, the siphonal canal is short and straight, terminating in a moderately shallow siphonal notch.

== Distribution ==
This marine species occurs off Western Australia.
