= Pusia savellii =

Scientific classification
- Kingdom: Animalia
- Phylum: Mollusca
- Class: Gastropoda
- Subclass: Caenogastropoda
- Order: Neogastropoda
- Family: Costellariidae
- Genus: Pusia
- Species: P. savellii

Binomial name
- Pusia savellii Poppe & Tagaro, 2026

Species of gastropod

Pusia savellii is a species of small sea snail, marine gastropod mollusk in the family Costellariidae, also known as the ribbed miters.

== Distribution ==
This species occurs off the coast of Senegal.
