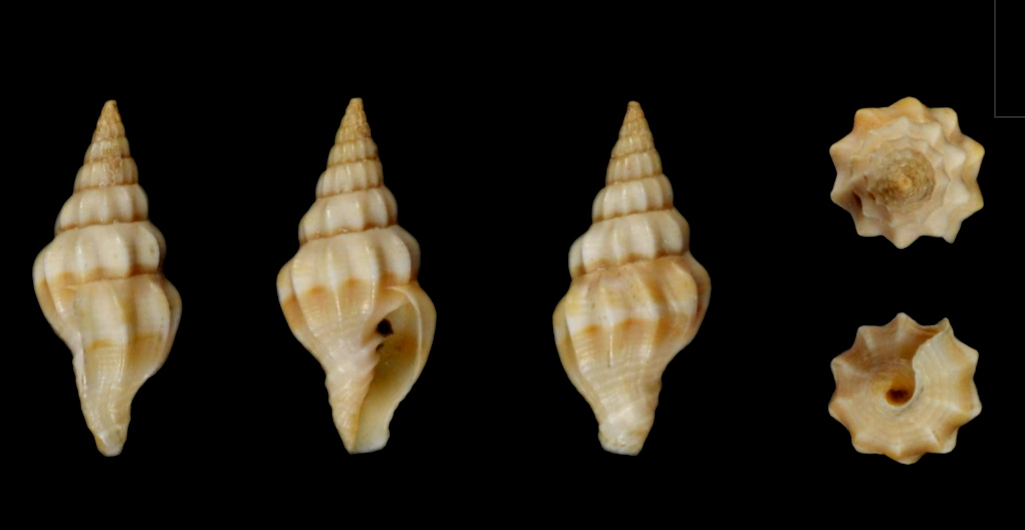
- Shell of Pusia hendersoni (specimen at the Smithsonian Institution)

Scientific classification
- Kingdom: Animalia
- Phylum: Mollusca
- Class: Gastropoda
- Subclass: Caenogastropoda
- Order: Neogastropoda
- Superfamily: Turbinelloidea
- Family: Costellariidae
- Genus: Pusia
- Species: P. hendersoni

Binomial name
- Pusia hendersoni (Dall, 1927)

Synonyms
- Mitra hendersoni Dall, 1927 superseded combination; Vexillum (Costellaria) hendersoni (Dall, 1927) superseded combination; Vexillum hendersoni (Dall, 1927) superseded combination

= Pusia hendersoni =

Species of gastropod

Pusia hendersoni is a species of sea snail, a marine gastropod mollusk, in the family Costellariidae, the ribbed miters.

== Description ==
The length of the shell is 17 mm; the length of the body whorl is 10 mm; and the maximum diameter is 6 mm.

(Original description) The shell is small, consisting of about seven whorls, excluding approximately three small, smooth, brownish whorls in the protoconch. Its color is whitish, with a brownish base that becomes darker near the periphery, where it appears as a narrow brown band just behind the suture on the spire.

The axial sculpture consists of (on the body whorl, about ten) rather sharp, nearly vertical ribs with wider interspaces, which become obsolete near the siphonal canal. The spiral sculpture consists of (on the penultimate whorl, about eight) rather feeble, flattish threads that are stronger and more widely spaced toward the canal, from which they are separated by a distinct sulcus. The siphonal canal bears two or three much stronger spiral threads.

The periostracum is pale and fibrous. The suture is distinct but not deep. The aperture is narrow; the outer lip is sharp and is lirate internally; the columella has three plaits; and the siphonal canal is moderately differentiated and slightly recurved.

== Distribution ==
This marine species occurs off Georgia, USA; also in the Caribbean Sea and the Gulf of Mexico; also off Bermuda.
