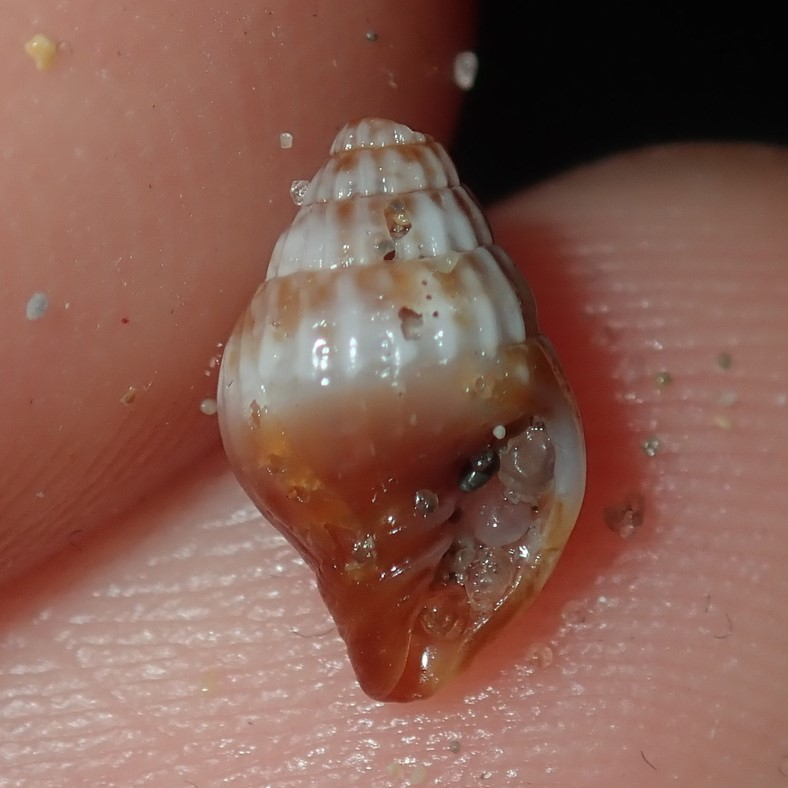

Scientific classification
- Kingdom: Animalia
- Phylum: Mollusca
- Class: Gastropoda
- Subclass: Caenogastropoda
- Order: Neogastropoda
- Superfamily: Turbinelloidea
- Family: Costellariidae
- Genus: Pusia
- Species: P. simoneae

Binomial name
- Pusia simoneae Marrow, 2017

= Pusia simoneae =

Species of gastropod

Pusia simoneae is a species of sea snail, a marine gastropod mollusk, in the family Costellariidae, the ribbed miters.

== Distribution ==
This species occurs in Western Australia.
