= Pusia paolinii =

Scientific classification
- Kingdom: Animalia
- Phylum: Mollusca
- Class: Gastropoda
- Subclass: Caenogastropoda
- Order: Neogastropoda
- Superfamily: Turbinelloidea
- Family: Costellariidae
- Genus: Pusia
- Species: P. paolinii

Binomial name
- Pusia paolinii Gori, Rosado & R. Salisbury, 2019

Synonyms
- Pusia (Pusia) paolinii Gori, Rosado & R. Salisbury, 2019 alternative representation

Species of gastropod

Pusia paolinii is a species of sea snail, a marine gastropod mollusk, in the family Costellariidae, the ribbed miters.

== Distribution ==
This marine species occurs off Oman
