= Pusia brevior =

Scientific classification
- Kingdom: Animalia
- Phylum: Mollusca
- Class: Gastropoda
- Subclass: Caenogastropoda
- Order: Neogastropoda
- Family: Costellariidae
- Genus: Pusia
- Species: †P. brevior

Binomial name
- †Pusia brevior (Friedberg, 1911)

Synonyms
- † Turricula recticosta var. brevior Friedberg, 191; † Vexillum brevior (Friedberg, 1911) superseded combination

Species of gastropod

Pusia brevior is an extinct species of sea snail, a marine gastropod mollusk, in the family Costellariidae, the ribbed miters.

== Distribution ==
Fossils of this marine species were found in Miocene strata in Poland and Slovakia.
