= Pusia aurae =

Scientific classification
- Kingdom: Animalia
- Phylum: Mollusca
- Class: Gastropoda
- Subclass: Caenogastropoda
- Order: Neogastropoda
- Superfamily: Turbinelloidea
- Family: Costellariidae
- Genus: Pusia
- Species: P. aurae

Binomial name
- Pusia aurae S.-I Huang, 2023

Species of gastropod

Pusia aurae is a species of sea snail, a marine gastropod mollusk, in the family Costellariidae, the ribbed miters.

== Distribution ==
This marine species occurs of Taiwan.
