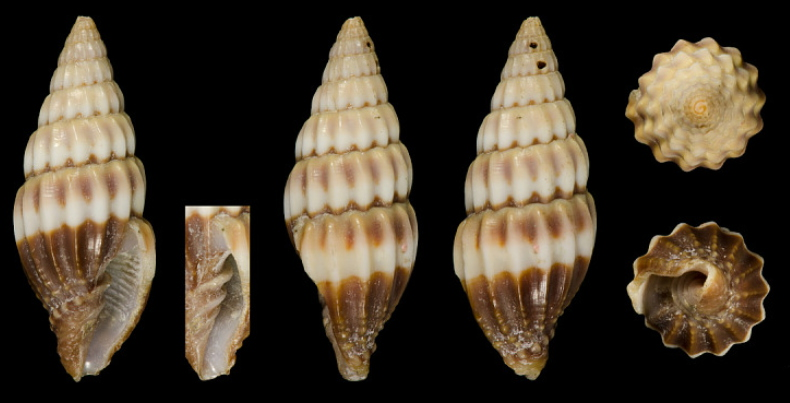
- Shell of Pusia epiphanea (holotype at the Smithsonian Institution)

Scientific classification
- Kingdom: Animalia
- Phylum: Mollusca
- Class: Gastropoda
- Subclass: Caenogastropoda
- Order: Neogastropoda
- Family: Costellariidae
- Genus: Pusia
- Species: P. epiphanea

Binomial name
- Pusia epiphanea Rehder, 1943

Synonyms
- Vexillium epiphaneum Rehder, 1943 (superseded combination); Vexillum (Pusia) epiphaneum (Rehder, 1943)

= Pusia epiphanea =

Species of gastropod

Pusia epiphanea is a species of small sea snail, marine gastropod mollusk in the family Costellariidae, the ribbed miters.

== Description ==
The length of the shell varies between 9 mm and 17 mm.

== Distribution ==
This marine species occurs in the Caribbean Sea and off Bermuda.
