= Pusia versicolor =

Scientific classification
- Kingdom: Animalia
- Phylum: Mollusca
- Class: Gastropoda
- Subclass: Caenogastropoda
- Order: Neogastropoda
- Superfamily: Turbinelloidea
- Family: Costellariidae
- Genus: Pusia
- Species: P. versicolor

Binomial name
- Pusia versicolor Marrow, 2017

Species of gastropod

Pusia versicolor is a species of sea snail, a marine gastropod mollusk, in the family Costellariidae, the ribbed miters.

It was one of four new species of Pusia described from Western Australia by Michael Marrow in 2017.

== Description ==
The length of the shell attains 9.7 mm.

== Distribution ==
This species occurs in Western Australia (state).
