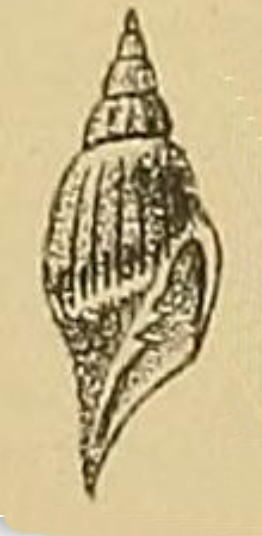
- Original image of a shell of Canaripusia zythochroa

Scientific classification
- Kingdom: Animalia
- Phylum: Mollusca
- Class: Gastropoda
- Subclass: Caenogastropoda
- Order: Neogastropoda
- Family: Costellariidae
- Genus: Canaripusia
- Species: C. zythochroa

Binomial name
- Canaripusia zythochroa (Melvill, 1888)

Synonyms
- Mitra zythochroa Melvill, 1888 superseded combination; Vexillum zythochroa (Melvill, 1888) superseded combination

= Canaripusia zythochroa =

Species of gastropod

Canaripusia zythochroa is a species of small sea snail, marine gastropod mollusk in the family Costellariidae, the ribbed miters.

== Description ==
The length of the shell attains 10 mm, its diameter 5 mm.

(Original description) The shell is oblong and acuminate, becoming somewhat attenuated toward the ends. The spire is spindle-shaped. The surface is ornamented with longitudinal ribs that become plicate at the suture; the ribs themselves are smooth, while the spaces between them are obscurely striated. The shell is yellowish-tawny in color and is marked by a white band. The columella bears five folds.
