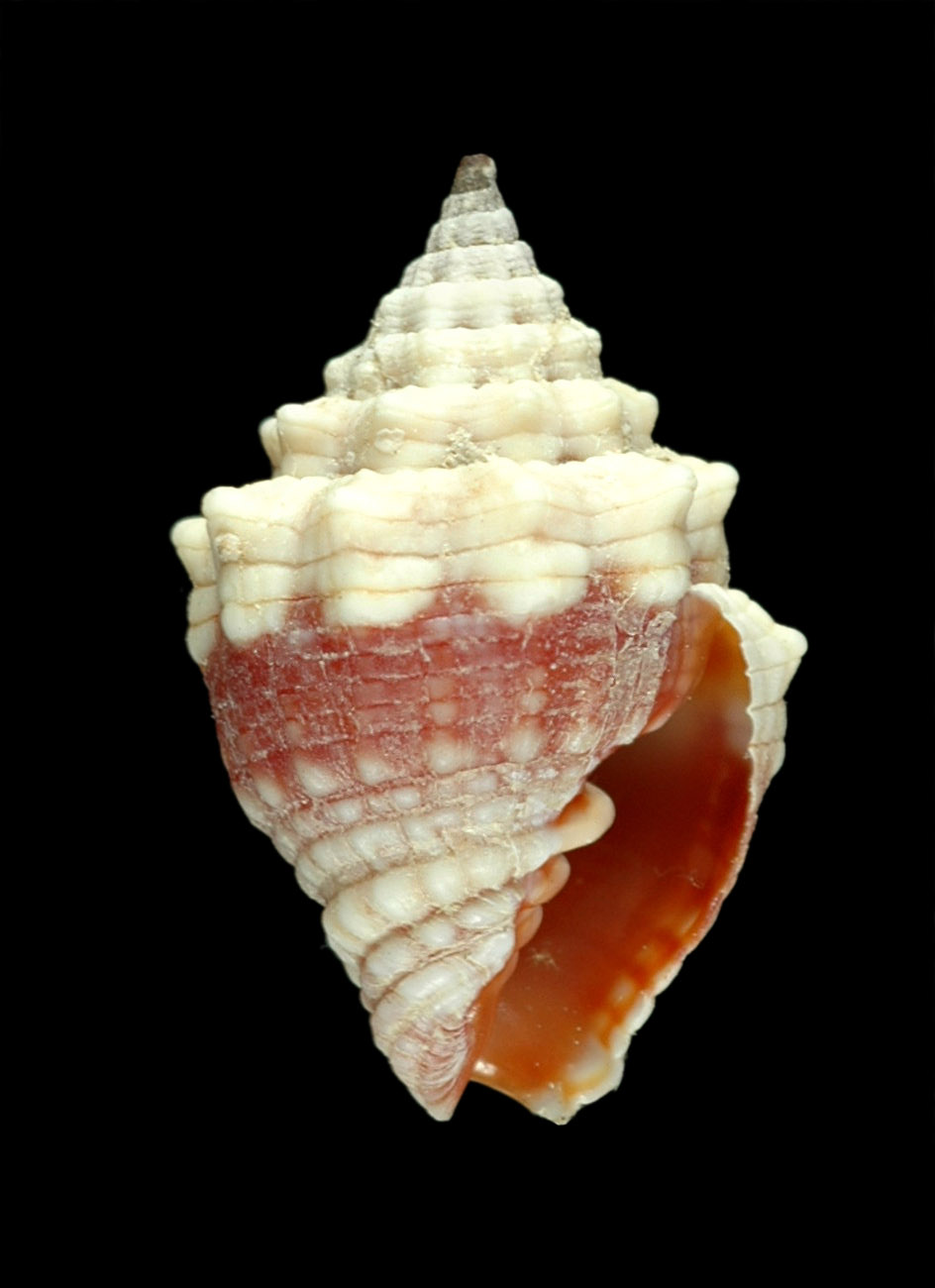
- Shell of Orphanopusia patriarchalis (specimen at MNHN, Paris)

Scientific classification
- Kingdom: Animalia
- Phylum: Mollusca
- Class: Gastropoda
- Subclass: Caenogastropoda
- Order: Neogastropoda
- Superfamily: Turbinelloidea
- Family: Costellariidae
- Genus: Orphanopusia; Fedosov, Herrmann & Bouchet, 2017

Type species
- Voluta patriarchalis Gmelin, 1791

= Orphanopusia =

Genus of gastropods

Orphanopusia is a genus of sea snails, marine gastropod mollusks, in the family Costellariidae, the ribbed miters.

== Species ==
Species within the genus Orphanopusia include:

- Orphanopusia festa (Reeve, 1845)
- Orphanopusia osiridis (Issel, 1869)
- Orphanopusia patriarchalis (Gmelin, 1791)
