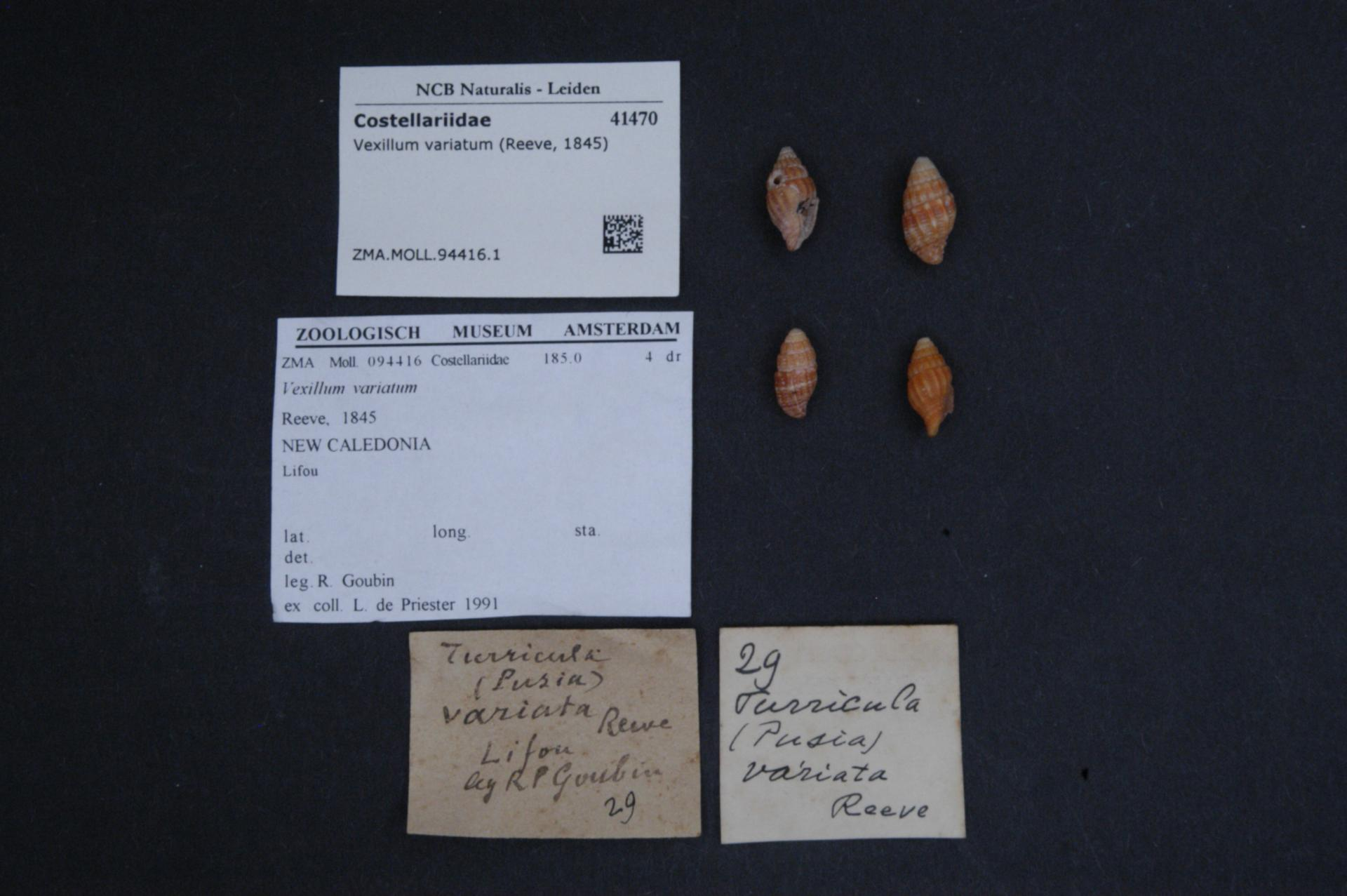
- Shell of Pusia variata(specimens at Naturalis Biodiversity Center)

Scientific classification
- Kingdom: Animalia
- Phylum: Mollusca
- Class: Gastropoda
- Subclass: Caenogastropoda
- Order: Neogastropoda
- Superfamily: Turbinelloidea
- Family: Costellariidae
- Genus: Pusia
- Species: P. variata

Binomial name
- Pusia variata (Reeve, 1845)

Synonyms
- Mitra variata Reeve, 1845 (original combination); Pusia splendidula Sarasúa, 1975; Vexillum (Pusia) variatum (Reeve, 1845); Vexillum variatum (Reeve, 1845) superseded combination

= Pusia variata =

Species of gastropod

Pusia variata is a species of small sea snail, marine gastropod mollusk in the family Costellariidae, the ribbed miters.

== Description ==
The length of the shell attains 19 mm.

The shell is yellowish brown with a dark superior band, and a white band with dark margins below the middle.

== Distribution ==
This marine species occurs off the Bahamas and Bermuda; in the Caribbean Sea; off Brazil.
