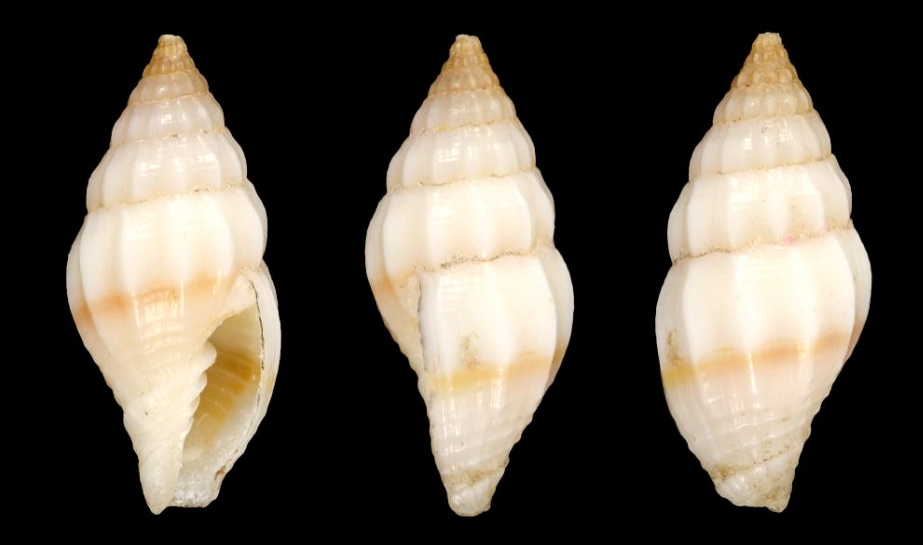
- Shell of Vexillum cubanum (specimen at the Smithsonian Institution)

Scientific classification
- Kingdom: Animalia
- Phylum: Mollusca
- Class: Gastropoda
- Subclass: Caenogastropoda
- Order: Neogastropoda
- Superfamily: Turbinelloidea
- Family: Costellariidae
- Genus: Pusia
- Species: P. cubana

Binomial name
- Pusia cubana (Aguayo & Rehder, 1936)

Synonyms
- Mitra cruzana Nowell-Usticke, 1959; Vexillum (Pusia) cubanum Aguayo & Rehder, 1936; Vexillum cruzana G.W. Nowell-Usticke, 1959; Vexillum cubanum Aguayo & Rehder, 1936 superseded combination

= Pusia cubana =

Species of gastropod

Pusia cubana is a species of sea snail, a marine gastropod mollusk, in the family Costellariidae, the ribbed miters.

== Description ==
The length of the shell attains 10 mm.Due to being from family of costellariidae it shares similarities to other members of the family such as a high spire,narrow aperture and a well developed siphonal canal.

These are non broadcast spawning and are not found in trochophore phase(an early larval type state).

== Distribution ==
This marine species occurs off Cuba in near Western atlantic and in the Caribbean Sea.This region is mainly known for its seamounts and knolls.
