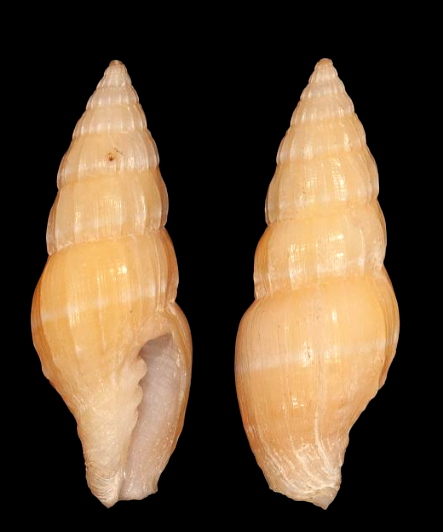
- Shell of Pusia trophonia (lectotype at the Smithsonian Institution)

Scientific classification
- Kingdom: Animalia
- Phylum: Mollusca
- Class: Gastropoda
- Subclass: Caenogastropoda
- Order: Neogastropoda
- Family: Costellariidae
- Genus: Pusia
- Species: P. trophonia

Binomial name
- Pusia trophonia (Dall, 1889)

Synonyms
- Mitra (Costellaria) trophonia Dall, 1889; Vexillum (Costellaria) trophonium (Dall, 1889); Vexillum trophonium (Dall, 1889) superseded combination

= Pusia trophonia =

Species of gastropod

Pusia trophonia is a species of small sea snail, marine gastropod mollusk in the family Costellariidae, the ribbed miters.

== Description ==
The shell grows to a length of 20 mm, its diameter 6.75 mm.

(Original description) The shell is elongated. The protoconch contains five or more whorls, acute, yellowish brown, polished, glassy. The teleoconch contains about eight normal moderately rounded whorls. The body whorl forms more than half the shell. The sculpture consists of about (on the body whorl) fourteen sharp little-elevated ridges, which are rounder on the earliest whorls and obsolete on the last half of the (adult) body whorl. Incremental lines are irregularly prominent. The spiral sculpture consists of fine faint grooves, most visible between the ridges, three or four ill-defined distant revolving ridges on the anterior part of the body whorl which make a sort of arch in the transverse ridges when the latter cross them, and two to four ridges on the siphonal canal corresponding to the plaits. The siphonal fasciole is prominent and well marked. The suture is distinct, not deep, waved by the ends of the transverse ridges. The aperture is narrow. The outer lip is thin, sharp, with faint fine lirae in the throat. A small callus occurs at the posterior angle on the body whorl. The columella contains four plaits, the first rather small. The siphonal canal is nearly as wide as the aperture and is somewhat recurved.

The color of the shell goes from pale yellow to deep orange, with a narrow opaque white band a little way behind the suture, which swells a little where it crosses the transverse crests, and may in some specimens be represented by a series of spots on the crests. The surface is rather glossy.

== Distribution ==
This species occurs in the Atlantic Ocean from Florida to Brazil: and in the Lesser Antilles.
