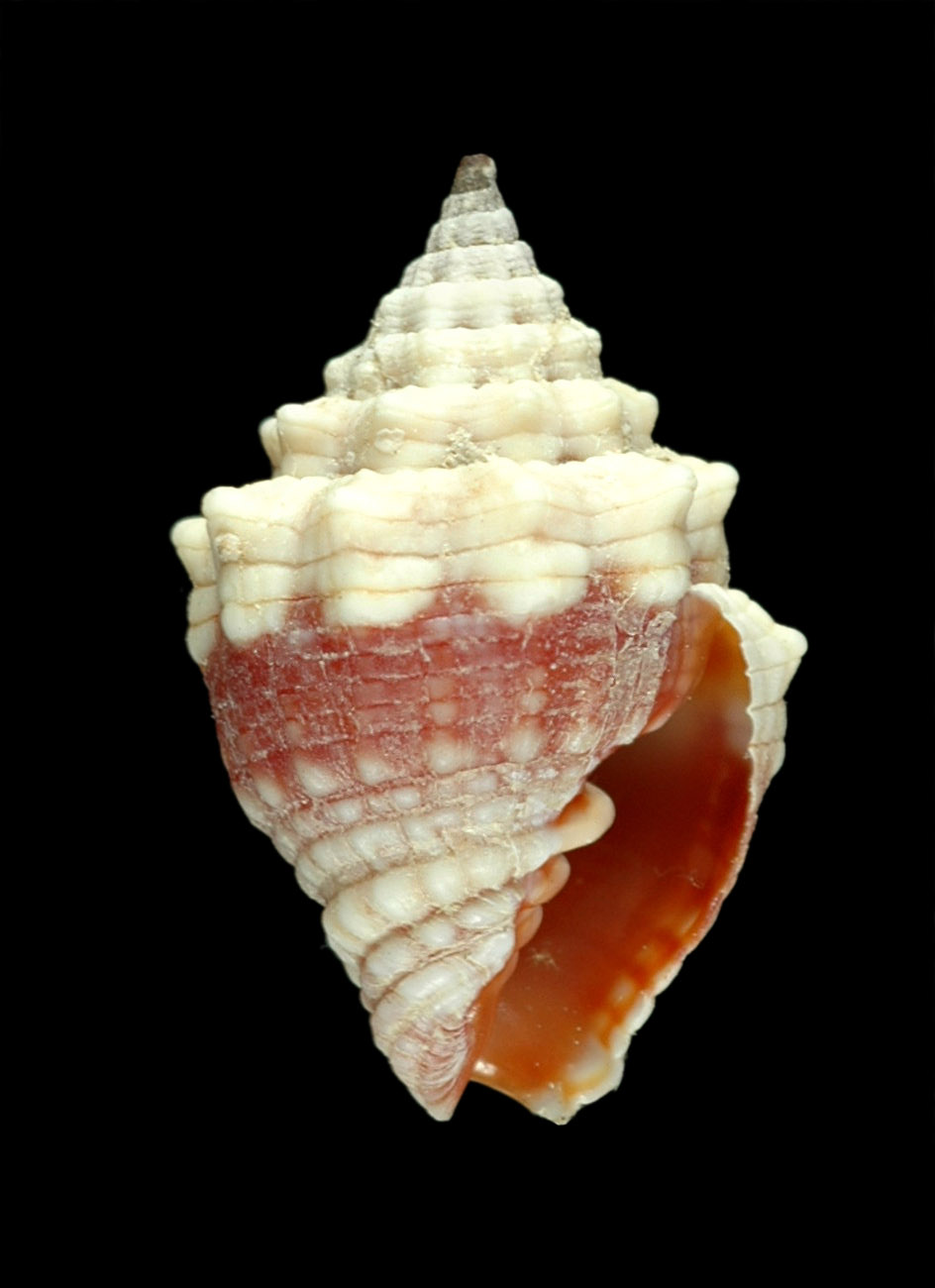
- Shell of Orphanopusia patriarchalis (specimen at MNHN, Paris)

Scientific classification
- Kingdom: Animalia
- Phylum: Mollusca
- Class: Gastropoda
- Subclass: Caenogastropoda
- Order: Neogastropoda
- Superfamily: Turbinelloidea
- Family: Costellariidae
- Genus: Orphanopusia
- Species: O. patriarchalis

Binomial name
- Orphanopusia patriarchalis (Gmelin, 1791)

Synonyms
- Mitra patriarchalis (Gmelin, 1791); Pusia patriarchalis (Gmelin, 1791); Vexillum (Pusia) patriarchale (Gmelin, 1791); Vexillum patriarchale (Gmelin, 1791); Vexillum patriarchalis (Gmelin, 1791); Voluta patriarchalis Gmelin, 1791 (original combination)

= Orphanopusia patriarchalis =

Species of gastropod

Orphanopusia patriarchalis, common name the patriarchal mitre, is a species of sea snail, a marine gastropod mollusk, in the family Costellariidae, the ribbed miters.

== Description ==
The shell size varies between 13 mm and 30 mm.

== Distribution ==
This marine species occurs in the Indian Ocean along the Seychelles and in the Pacific Ocean along Japan, Hawaii and off Papua New Guinea.
