= Pusia hastata =

Scientific classification
- Kingdom: Animalia
- Phylum: Mollusca
- Class: Gastropoda
- Subclass: Caenogastropoda
- Order: Neogastropoda
- Superfamily: Turbinelloidea
- Family: Costellariidae
- Genus: Pusia
- Species: †P. hastata

Binomial name
- †Pusia hastata (D.L.G. Karsten, 1849)

Synonyms
- † Mitra hastata Karsten, 1849 (original combination); † Vexillum hastatum (D.L.G. Karsten, 1849)

Species of gastropod

Pusia hastata is an extinct species of sea snail, a marine gastropod mollusk, in the family Costellariidae, the ribbed miters.

== Description ==
The length of the shell attains 9 mm.

== Distribution ==
Fossils of this marine species were found in Oligocene strata in Germany.
