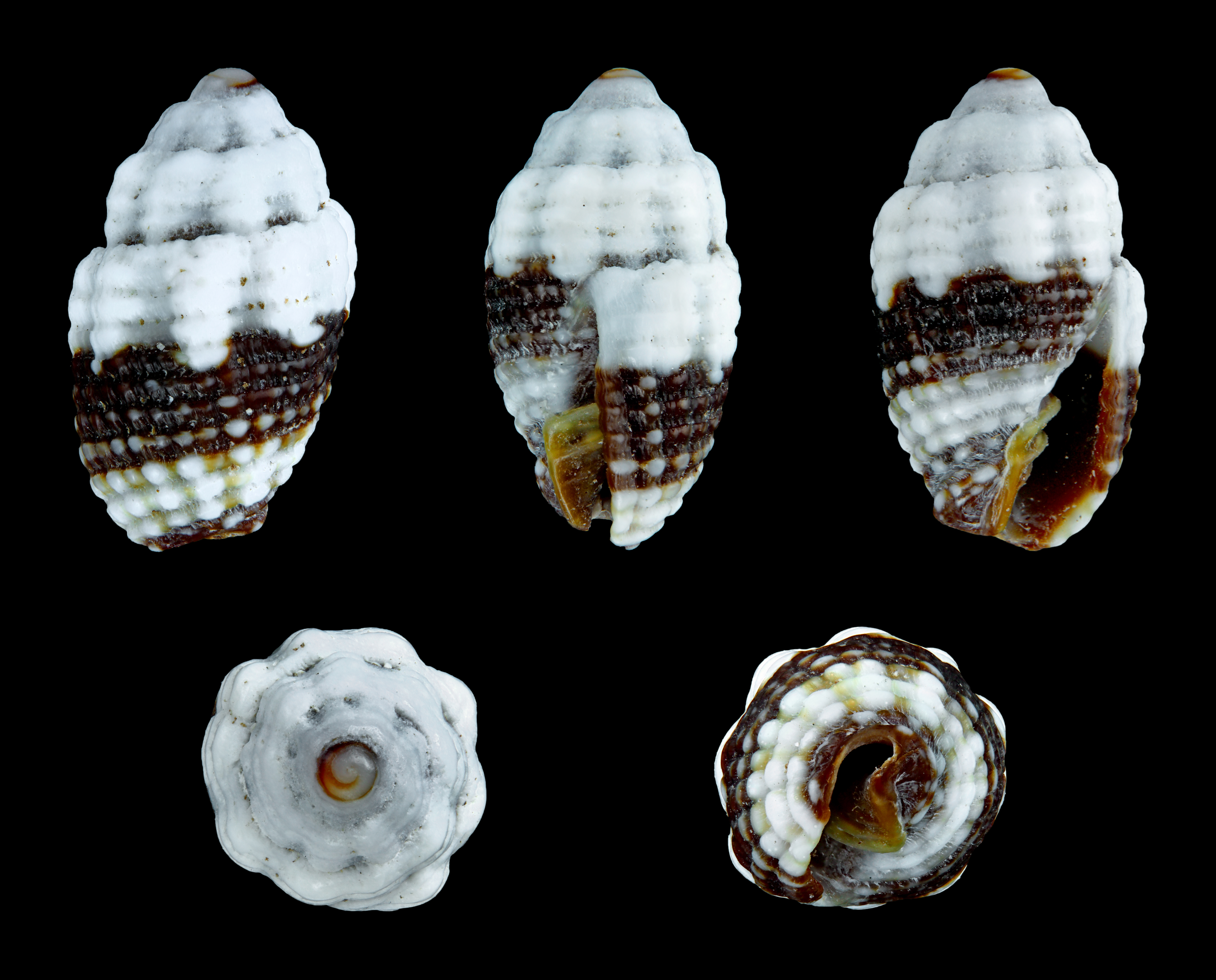
- Condylomitra tuberosa

Scientific classification
- Kingdom: Animalia
- Phylum: Mollusca
- Class: Gastropoda
- Subclass: Caenogastropoda
- Order: Neogastropoda
- Superfamily: Mitroidea
- Family: Mitridae
- Genus: Condylomitra; Fedosov, Herrmann, Kantor & Bouchet, 2018

Species
- See text

= Condylomitra =

Genus of gastropods

Condylomitra is a genus of sea snails, marine gastropod mollusks in the family Mitridae.

== Species ==
Species within the genus Condylomitra include:

- Condylomitra bernhardina (Röding, 1798)
- Condylomitra tuberosa (Reeve, 1845)
