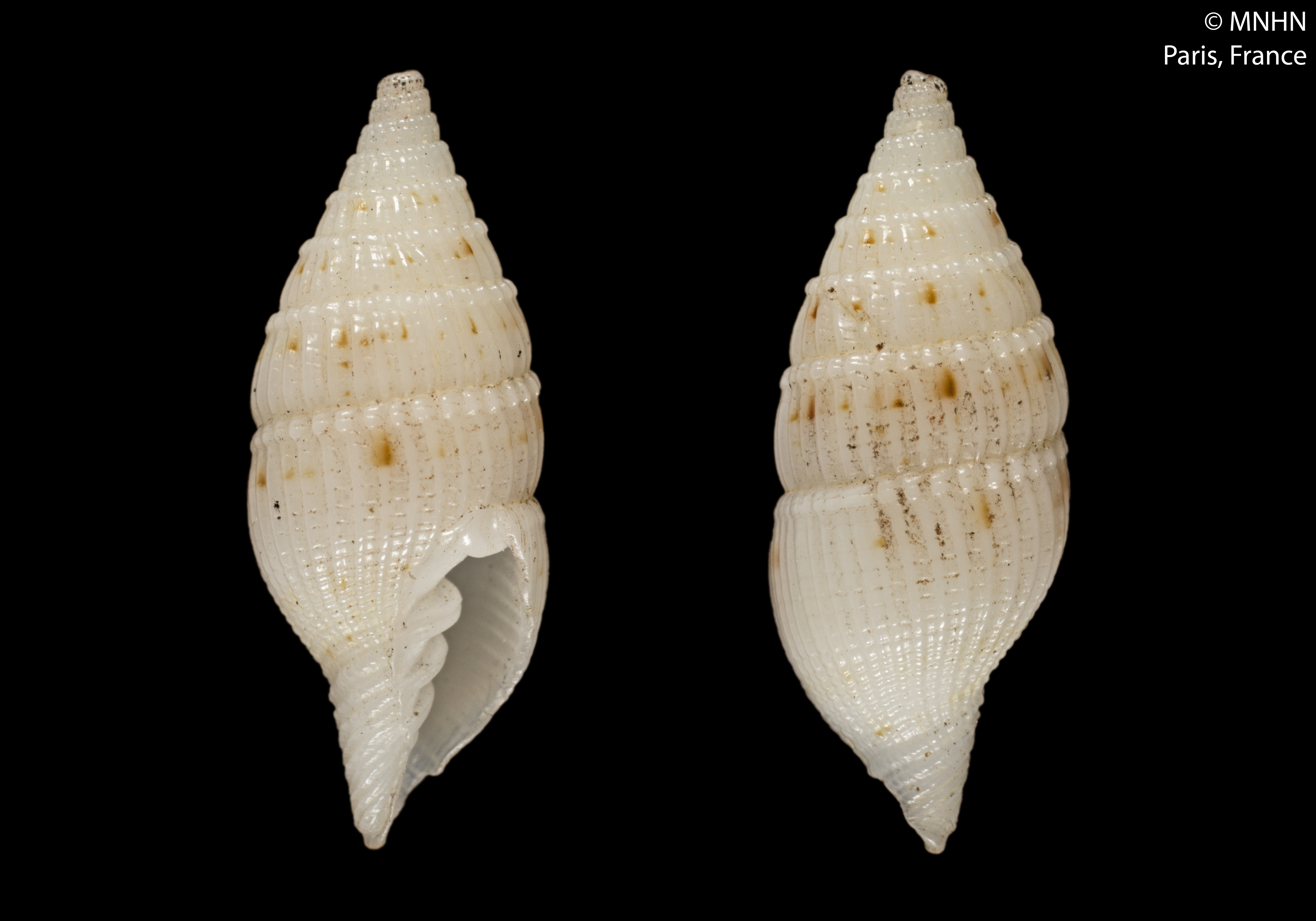
- Shell of Canaripusia catenata

Scientific classification
- Kingdom: Animalia
- Phylum: Mollusca
- Class: Gastropoda
- Subclass: Caenogastropoda
- Order: Neogastropoda
- Superfamily: Turbinelloidea
- Family: Costellariidae
- Genus: Canaripusia; Fedosov, Bouchet, Dekkers, Gori, S.-I Huang, Kantor, Lemarcis, Marrow, Ratti, Rosenberg, R. Salisbury, Zvonareva & Puillandre, 2025

Type species
- Canaripusia citraea Fedosov, Bouchet, Dekkers, Gori, S.-I Huang, Kantor, Lemarcis, Marrow, Ratti, Rosenberg, R. Salisbury, Zvonareva & Puillandre, 2025 (type by original designation)

= Canaripusia =

Genus of gastropods

Canaripusia is a genus of small to medium-sized sea snails, marine gastropod molluscs in the family Costellariidae.

== Species ==
- Canaripusia catenata (Broderip, 1836)
- Canaripusia citraea Fedosov, Bouchet, Dekkers, Gori, S.-I Huang, Kantor, Lemarcis, Marrow, Ratti, Rosenberg, R. Salisbury, Zvonareva & Puillandre, 2025
- Canaripusia zythochroa (Melvill, 1888)

== Distribution ==
These species are found in deep waters of the Caribbean Sea.
