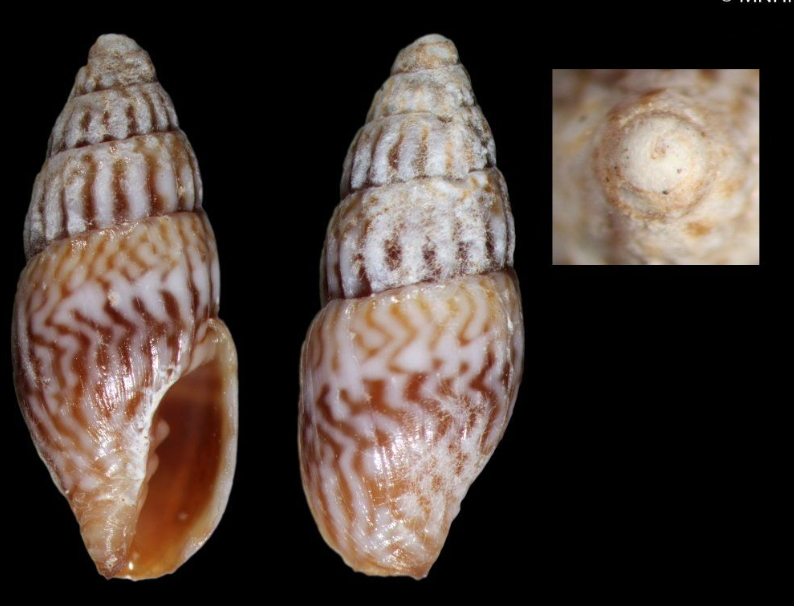
- Shell of Pusia anabelae (paratype at MNHN, Paris)

Scientific classification
- Kingdom: Animalia
- Phylum: Mollusca
- Class: Gastropoda
- Subclass: Caenogastropoda
- Order: Neogastropoda
- Superfamily: Turbinelloidea
- Family: Costellariidae
- Genus: Pusia
- Species: P. anabelae

Binomial name
- Pusia anabelae F. Fernandes, 1992

Synonyms
- Vexillum anabelae (F. Fernandes, 1992)

= Pusia anabelae =

Species of gastropod

Pusia anabelae is a species of sea snail, a marine gastropod mollusk, in the family Costellariidae, the ribbed miters.

== Description ==
The smallest specimen measures 5 mm in length and the largest 7 mm. The holotype measures 7 mm in length and 2.7 mm in maximum diameter.

The shell is small in size (5–7 mm), fusiform, and somewhat globose in its middle part, containing 5–6 whorls. These are marked by axial supra sutural striations which almost disappear on the body whorl, making the surface smooth. The columella has three slightly oblique and well-defined folds, ending in a rather broad base.

The lip is thin and curves inward in its lower third. The suture is well-marked but shallow. The protoconch is quite broad. The coloration is whitish-Grey, marked with brown zigzag lines, which are divided on the upper third of the last whorl by a somewhat lighter band. The zigzag lines below this band are darker in tone than those on the upper third. The aperture is a glossy brown color, with a lighter area corresponding to the external spiral band. The lip is internally bordered by a thin white line.

The columella is a glossy brown tone, and the columellar folds are pale and somewhat glassy. The radula is rachiglossate, typical of the genus (L + C + L), with approximately 35 rows. The rachidian tooth has three cusps, and the lateral teeth are crescent-shaped.

== Distribution ==
This marine species occurs in the Atlantic Ocean off Cape Verde.
