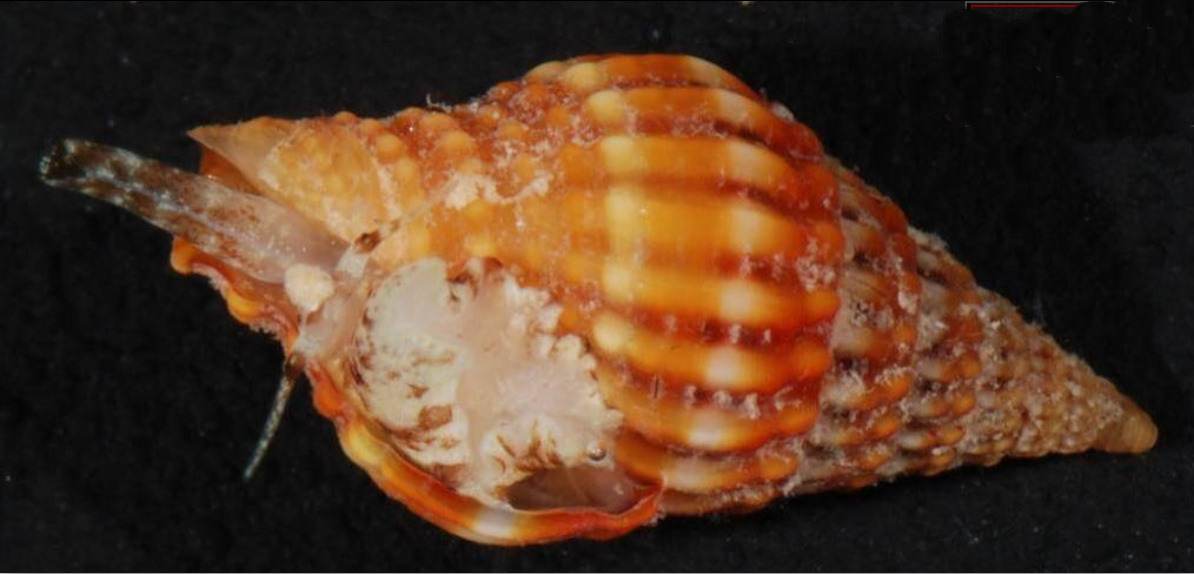
- Shell of Vexillum aureolatum (specimen at the Smithsonian Institution)

Scientific classification
- Kingdom: Animalia
- Phylum: Mollusca
- Class: Gastropoda
- Subclass: Caenogastropoda
- Order: Neogastropoda
- Superfamily: Turbinelloidea
- Family: Costellariidae
- Genus: Vexillum
- Species: V. aureolatum

Binomial name
- Vexillum aureolatum (Reeve, 1844)

Synonyms
- Mitra aureolata Reeve, 1844; Pusia aureolata (Reeve, 1844); Vexillum (Pusia) aureolatum (Reeve, 1844)

= Vexillum aureolatum =

Species of gastropod

Vexillum aureolatum, common name : the golden mitre, is a species of small sea snail, marine gastropod mollusk in the family Costellariidae, the ribbed miters.

== Description ==
The shell size varies between 8 mm and 29 mm.

The shell is orange-brown, with a small white superior zone, and sometimes one or more thread-like inferior bands; sometimes white with an orange band below the suture and another at the base.

== Distribution ==
This species occurs in the Red Sea and in the Indian Ocean off Madagascar and Mauritius and in the tropical Indo-Pacific from the Gulf of Oman to Polynesia, Fiji and Hawaii.
