= Vexillum multicostatum =

Scientific classification
- Kingdom: Animalia
- Phylum: Mollusca
- Class: Gastropoda
- Subclass: Caenogastropoda
- Order: Neogastropoda
- Superfamily: Turbinelloidea
- Family: Costellariidae
- Genus: Vexillum
- Species: V. multicostatum

Binomial name
- Vexillum multicostatum (Broderip, 1836)

Synonyms
- Pusia multicostata (Broderip, 1836); Tiara multicostata Broderip, 1836 (original combination); Vexillum (Pusia) multicostatum (Broderip, 1836)

Species of gastropod

Vexillum multicostatum is a species of small sea snail, marine gastropod mollusk in the family Costellariidae, the ribbed miters.

== Description ==
The length of the shell attains 21 mm.

== Distribution ==
This marine species occurs off the Marquesas Islands, French Polynesia.
