= Vexillum chibaense =

Scientific classification
- Kingdom: Animalia
- Phylum: Mollusca
- Class: Gastropoda
- Subclass: Caenogastropoda
- Order: Neogastropoda
- Superfamily: Turbinelloidea
- Family: Costellariidae
- Genus: Vexillum
- Species: V. chibaense

Binomial name
- Vexillum chibaense Salisbury & Rosenberg, 1999)

Synonyms
- Pusia chibaensis Salisbury & Rosenberg, 1999; Vexillum (Pusia) chibaense (R. Salisbury & Rosenberg, 1999)

Species of gastropod

Vexillum chibaense is a species of small sea snail, marine gastropod mollusk in the family Costellariidae, the ribbed miters.

== Description ==
The length of the shell attains 4.7 mm.

== Distribution ==
This species occurs in the Pacific Ocean off Japan.
