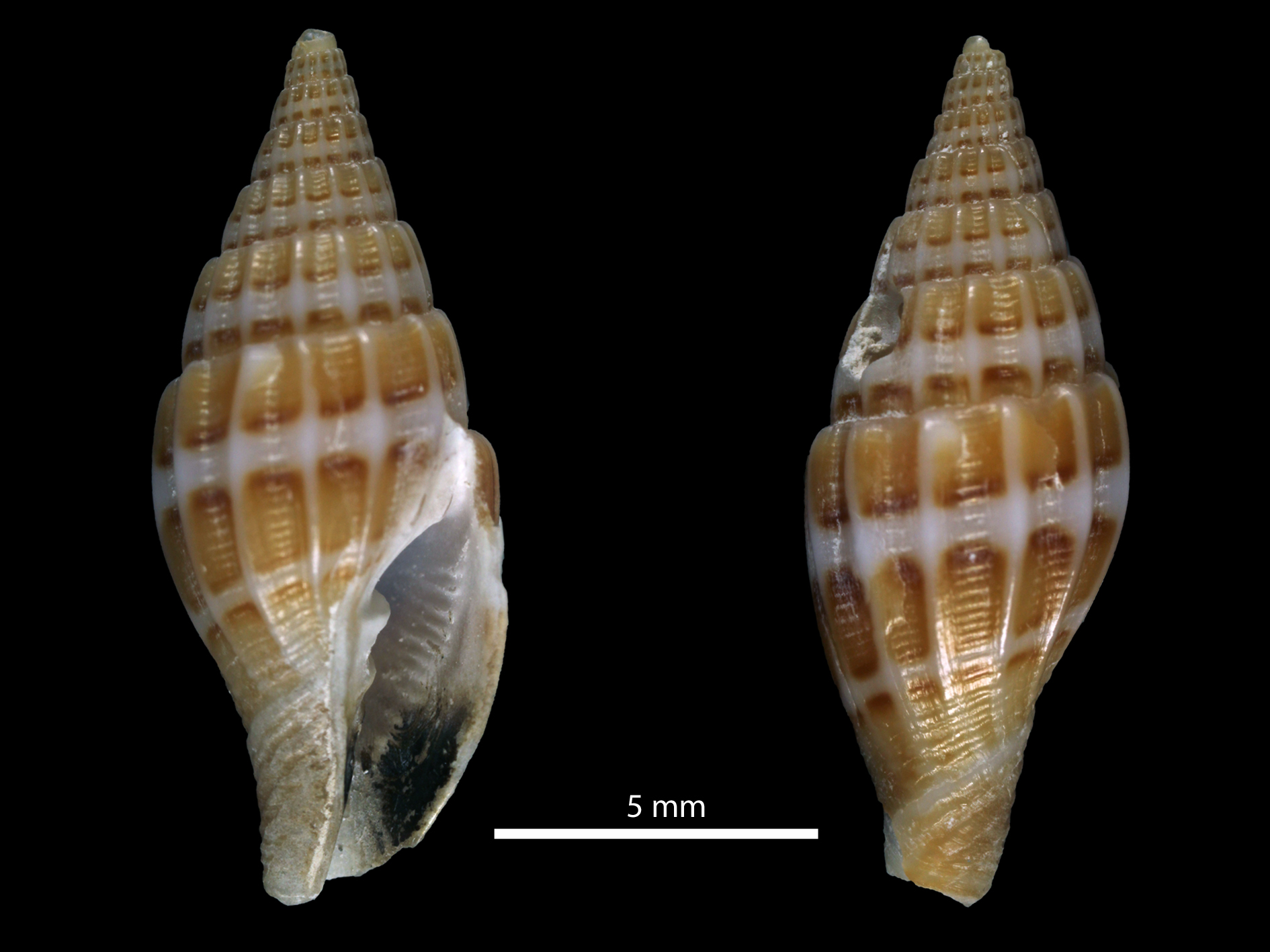
- Shell of Vexillena johnwolffi (paratype at MNHN, Paris)

Scientific classification
- Kingdom: Animalia
- Phylum: Mollusca
- Class: Gastropoda
- Subclass: Caenogastropoda
- Order: Neogastropoda
- Superfamily: Turbinelloidea
- Family: Costellariidae
- Genus: Vexillena
- Species: V. johnwolffi

Binomial name
- Vexillena johnwolffi (Herrmann & Salisbury, 2012)

Synonyms
- Pusia (Vexillena) johnwolffi (Herrmann & Salisbury, 2012); Vexillum (Costellaria) johnwolffi Herrmann & Salisbury, 2012; Vexillum johnwolffi Herrmann & Salisbury, 2012

= Vexillena johnwolffi =

Species of gastropod

Vexillena johnwolffi is a species of sea snail, a marine gastropod mollusk, in the family Costellariidae, the ribbed miters.

== Distribution ==
This species occurs in Coral Sea.
