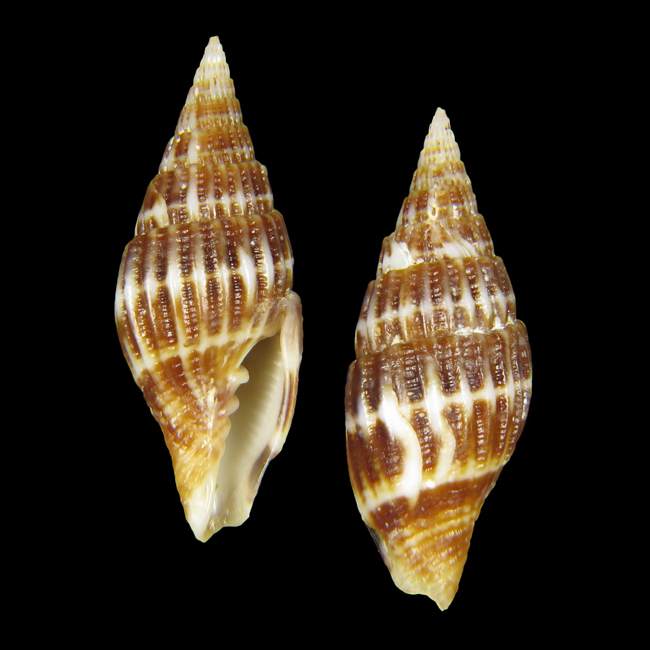
- Shell of Vexillena dautzenbergi

Scientific classification
- Kingdom: Animalia
- Phylum: Mollusca
- Class: Gastropoda
- Subclass: Caenogastropoda
- Order: Neogastropoda
- Superfamily: Turbinelloidea
- Family: Costellariidae
- Genus: Vexillena
- Species: V. dautzenbergi

Binomial name
- Vexillena dautzenbergi (Poppe, Guillot de Suduiraut & Tagaro, 2006)

Synonyms
- Pusia (Vexillena) dautzenbergi (Poppe, Guillot de Suduiraut & Tagaro, 2006); Pusia dautzenbergi (Poppe, E. Guillot de Suduiraut & Tagaro, 2006) superseded combination; Vexillum (Costellaria) dautzenbergi Poppe, Guillot de Suduiraut & Tagaro, 2006; Vexillum dautzenbergi Poppe, Guillot de Suduiraut & Tagaro, 2006

= Vexillena dautzenbergi =

Species of gastropod

Vexillena dautzenbergi is a species of sea snail, a marine gastropod mollusk, in the family Costellariidae, the ribbed miters.

== Distribution ==
This marine species occurs off the Philippines..
