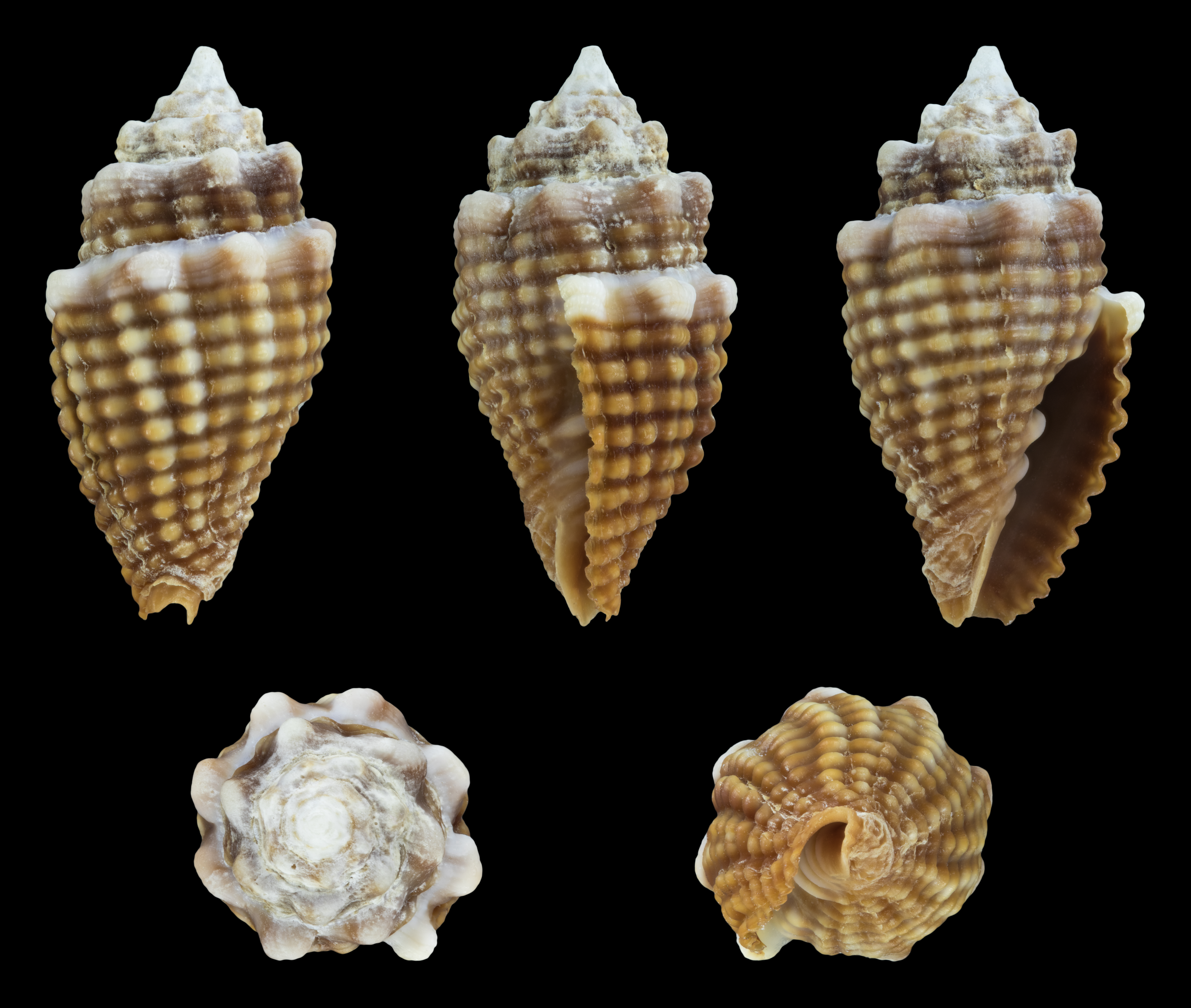
- Shell of Condylomitra bernhardina

Scientific classification
- Kingdom: Animalia
- Phylum: Mollusca
- Class: Gastropoda
- Subclass: Caenogastropoda
- Order: Neogastropoda
- Family: Mitridae
- Genus: Condylomitra
- Species: C. bernhardina

Binomial name
- Condylomitra bernhardina (Röding, 1798)

Synonyms
- Mitra (Nebularia) bernhardina Röding, 1798; Mitra bernhardina Röding, 1798 (original combination); Mitra muriculata Lamarck, J.B.P.A. de, 1811; Pusia bernhardina (Röding, 1798); Pusia muriculata (Lamarck, 1811); Vexillum bernhardina (Röding, 1798)

= Condylomitra bernhardina =

Species of gastropod

Condylomitra bernhardina is a species of sea snail, a marine gastropod mollusk in the family Mitridae, the miters or miter snails.

== Description ==
The shell size varies between 12 mm and 30 mm.

== Distribution ==
This species is distributed in the Indian Ocean along Mozambique, Mauritius and the Mascarene Basin and in the Pacific Ocean along Queensland, the Solomons Islands, Papua New Guinea, and the Philippines.
