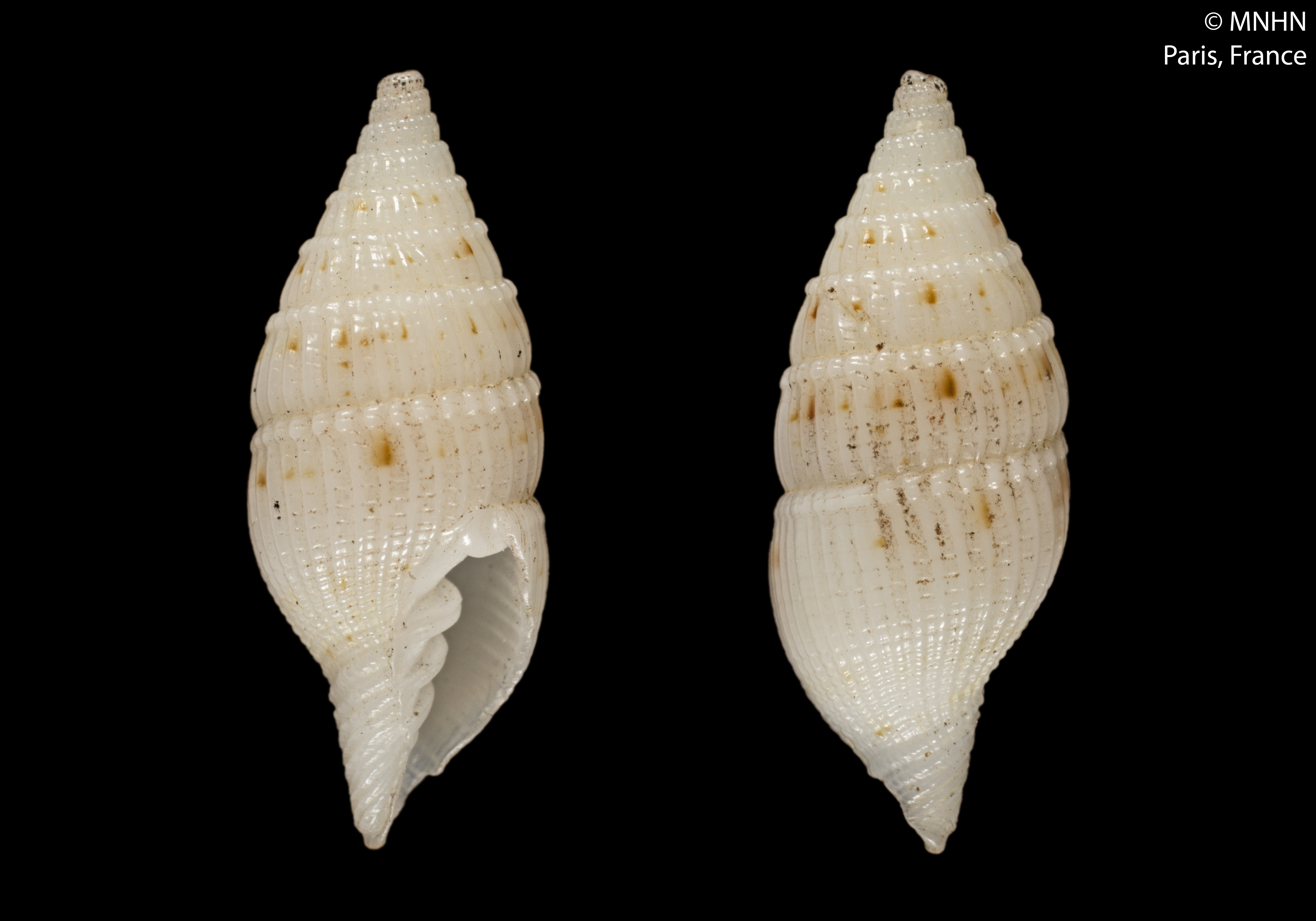
- Shell of Canaripusia catenata (specimen at MNHN, Paris)

Scientific classification
- Kingdom: Animalia
- Phylum: Mollusca
- Class: Gastropoda
- Subclass: Caenogastropoda
- Order: Neogastropoda
- Family: Costellariidae
- Genus: Canaripusia
- Species: C. catenata

Binomial name
- Canaripusia catenata (Broderip, 1836)

Synonyms
- Mitra bibsae Nowell-Usticke, 1969; Mitra catenata var. pluricostata Dautzenberg & Bouge, 1923; Mitra (Costellaria) catenata var. pluricostata Dautzenberg & Bouge, 1923; Pusia bibsae (Nowell-Usticke, 1969); Pusia nodulita Sarasúa, 1978; Tiara catenata Broderip, 1836; Vexillum (Pusia) catenatum (Broderip, 1836); Vexillum (Pusia) nodulita (Sarasúa, 1978); Vexillum bibsae (Nowell-Usticke, 1969); Vexillum catenatum (Broderip, 1836) superseded combination

= Canaripusia catenata =

Species of gastropod

Canaripusia catenata is a species of small sea snail, marine gastropod mollusk in the family Costellariidae, the ribbed miters.

== Description ==
The length of the shell attains 10 mm.

The shell is white, with large irregular chestnut-brown spots, arranged in bands.

== Distribution ==
This marine species occurs in the Indo-West Pacific, from Mauritius to Hawaii, Midway and Pitcairn Island; also off Australia.
