= Vexillena balutensis =

Scientific classification
- Kingdom: Animalia
- Phylum: Mollusca
- Class: Gastropoda
- Subclass: Caenogastropoda
- Order: Neogastropoda
- Superfamily: Turbinelloidea
- Family: Costellariidae
- Genus: Vexillena
- Species: V. balutensis

Binomial name
- Vexillena balutensis (Herrmann, 2009)

Synonyms
- Pusia (Vexillena) balutensis (Herrmann, 2009); Pusia balutensis (Herrmann, 2009) superseded combination; Vexillum (Costellaria) balutense Herrmann, 2009; Vexillum balutense Herrmann, 2009

Species of gastropod

Vexillena balutensis is a species of sea snail, a marine gastropod mollusk, in the family Costellariidae, the ribbed miters.

== Distribution ==
This marine species occurs off the Philippines.
