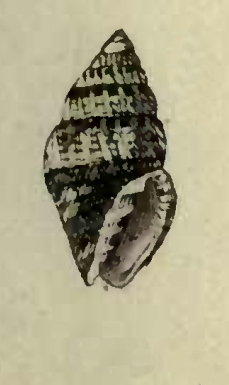
- Drawing of a shell of Vexillum amabile

Scientific classification
- Kingdom: Animalia
- Phylum: Mollusca
- Class: Gastropoda
- Subclass: Caenogastropoda
- Order: Neogastropoda
- Family: Costellariidae
- Genus: Vexillum
- Species: V. amabile

Binomial name
- Vexillum amabile (Reeve, 1845)

Synonyms
- Mitra amabilis Reeve, 1845; Mitra encausta Gould, 1850; Pusia amabilis (Reeve, 1845); Pusia encausta A.A. Gould, 1850; Vexillum (Pusia) amabile (Reeve, 1845)

= Vexillum amabile =

Species of gastropod

Vexillum amabile (common name the friendly mitre) is a species of small sea snail (marine gastropod mollusk) in the family Costellariidae, the ribbed miters.

== Description ==
Vexillum amabile's shell size varies between 10 mm and 20 mm.

Its shell has a short rhomboidal shape, with an obtusely depressed spire. Its whorls are somewhat rounded, and it has smooth, wave-like ribbings along its length and transverse grooves around its circumference. The columella of the shell is four-plaited. Its aperture is rather short, with a brown interior.

The outside of its shell is ashy to pinkish gray in colour. It has a broad white superior band, and sometimes has narrow white lines revolving below it.

== Life cycle ==
Embryos develop into planktonic trochophore larvae and later into juvenile veligers before becoming fully grown adults.

== Distribution ==
This species can be found in the Fiji, Kenya, Mozambique, Mascarene Islands, Indian Ocean, Madagascar, and Tanzania.
