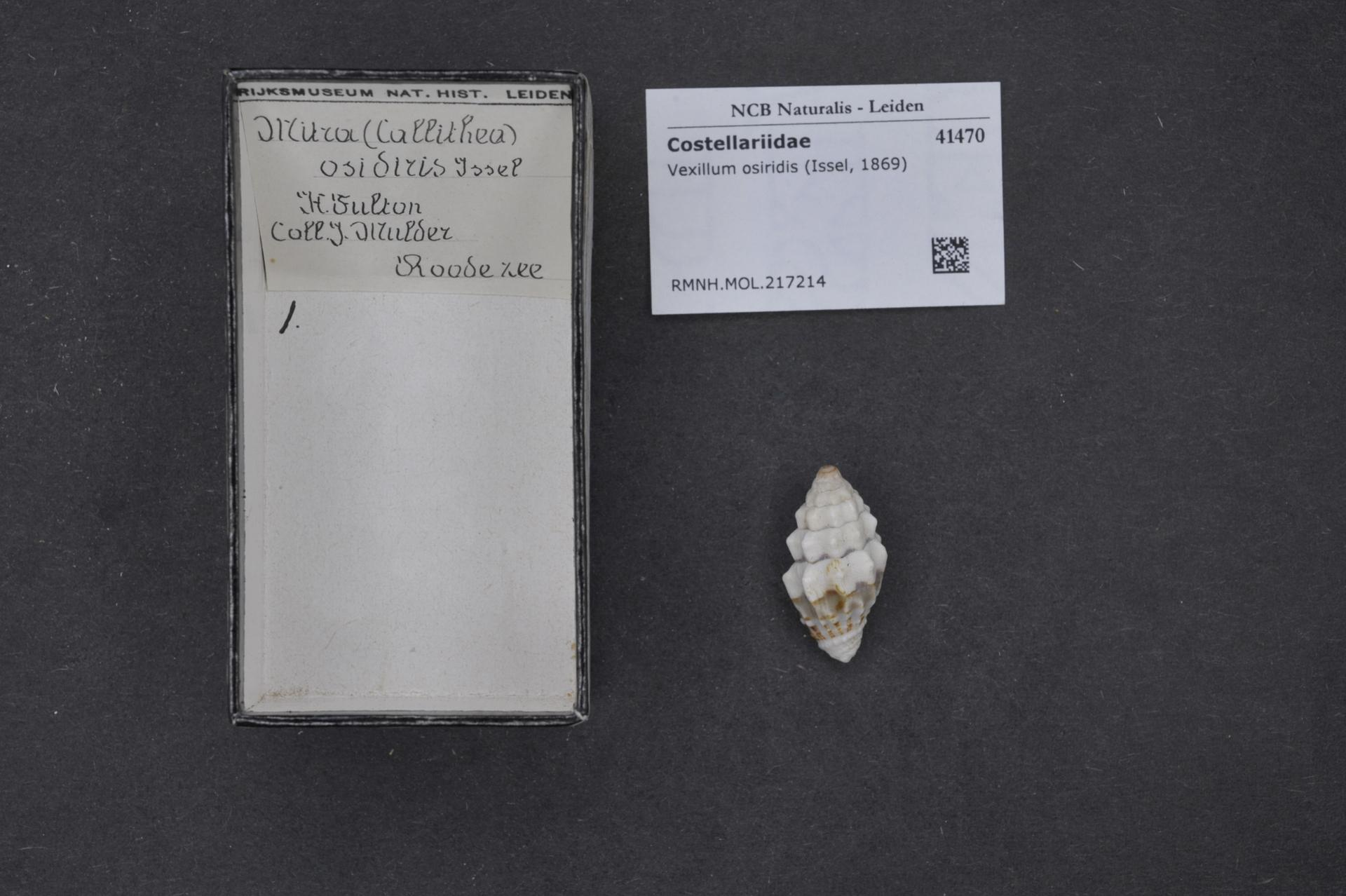
- Shell of Orphanopusia osiridis (specimen at Naturalis Biodiversity Center)

Scientific classification
- Kingdom: Animalia
- Phylum: Mollusca
- Class: Gastropoda
- Subclass: Caenogastropoda
- Order: Neogastropoda
- Superfamily: Turbinelloidea
- Family: Costellariidae
- Genus: Orphanopusia
- Species: O. osiridis

Binomial name
- Orphanopusia osiridis (Issel, 1869)

Synonyms
- Mitra osiridis Issel, 1869; Pusia osiridis (Issel, 1869); Vexillum (Pusia) osiridis (Issel, 1869); Vexillum osidiris; Vexillum osiridis (Issel, 1869)

= Orphanopusia osiridis =

Species of gastropod

Orphanopusia osiridis is a species of sea snail, a marine gastropod mollusk, in the family Costellariidae, the ribbed miters.

== Description ==
The length of the shell varies between 18 mm and 28 mm.

The sea surface temperature that Orphanopusia osiridis is found in are 20-30 Celsius. The sea surface salinity (PSU) for the sea snail (Orphanopusia osiridis) was 30–35.

== Distribution ==
This marine species occurs off Madagascar, Mozambique, Oman, and South Africa.
