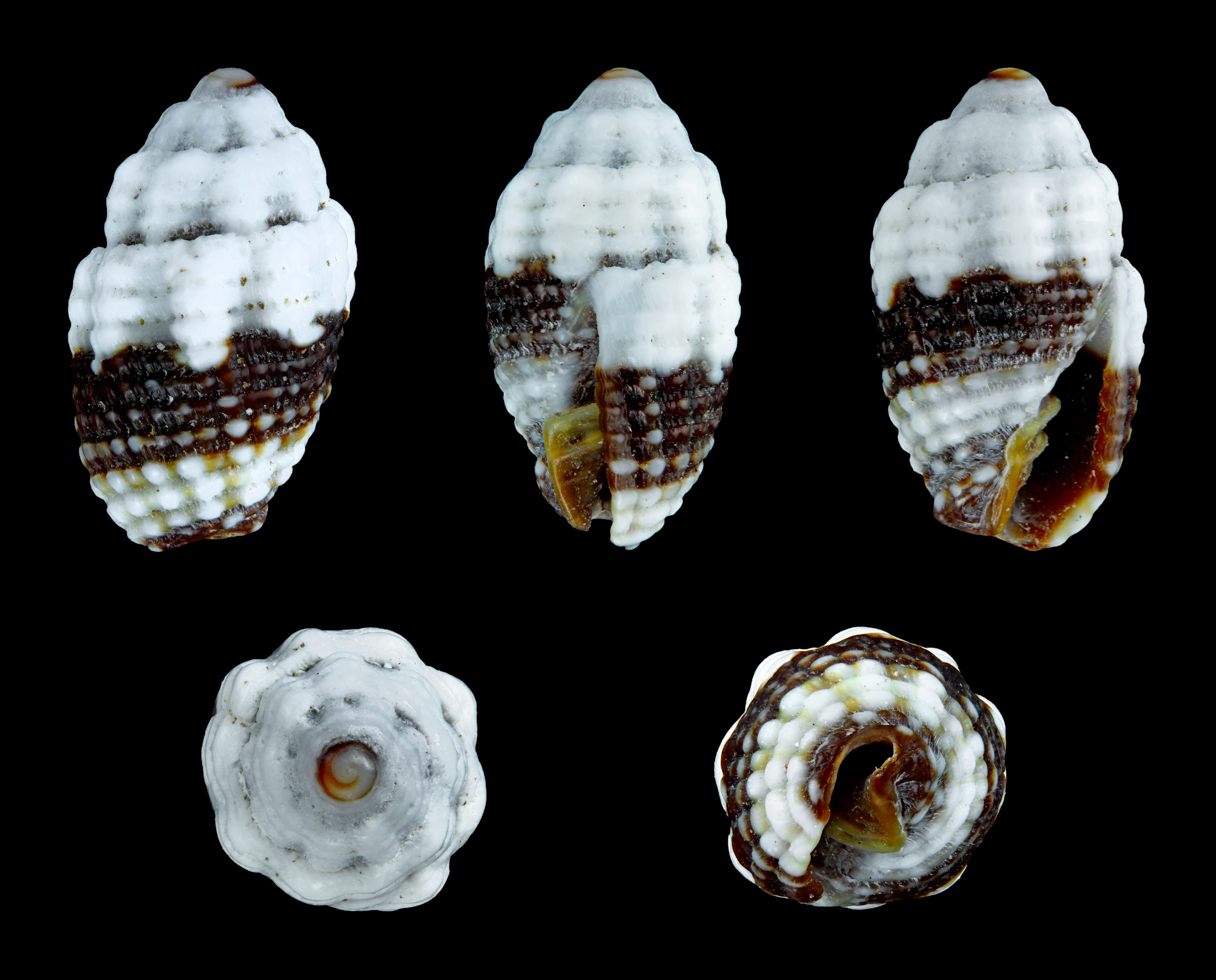

Scientific classification
- Kingdom: Animalia
- Phylum: Mollusca
- Class: Gastropoda
- Subclass: Caenogastropoda
- Order: Neogastropoda
- Family: Mitridae
- Genus: Condylomitra
- Species: C. tuberosa

Binomial name
- Condylomitra tuberosa (Reeve, 1845)

Synonyms
- Mitra patriarchalis Lamarck, 1811; Mitra tuberosa Reeve, 1845; Pusia meganodosa MacNeil, F.S. 1960; Pusia tuberosa (Reeve, 1845); Vexillum tuberosum (Reeve, 1845)

= Condylomitra tuberosa =

Species of gastropod

Condylomitra tuberosa is a species of sea snail, a marine gastropod mollusk in the family Mitridae, the miters or miter snails.

== Description ==
The shell size varies between 14 mm and 30 mm

== Distribution ==
This species occurs in the Indian Ocean off Mauritius and the Mascarene Basin and in the Pacific Ocean off the Philippines, the Fiji Islands and Papua New Guinea; off Australia (New South Wales, Queensland)
