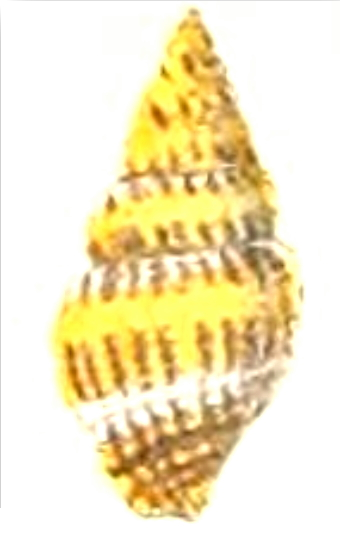
- Original image of Pusia pulchella

Scientific classification
- Kingdom: Animalia
- Phylum: Mollusca
- Class: Gastropoda
- Subclass: Caenogastropoda
- Order: Neogastropoda
- Family: Costellariidae
- Genus: Pusia
- Species: P. pulchella

Binomial name
- Pusia pulchella (Reeve, 1844)

Synonyms
- Mitra pulchella Reeve, 1844 (original combination); Pusia venusta Sarasúa, 1978; Vexillum (Pusia) pulchellum (Reeve, 1844); Vexillum pulchellum (Reeve, 1844) superseded combination; Vexillum venustum (Sarasúa, 1978)

= Pusia pulchella =

Species of gastropod

Pusia pulchella, common name the pretty mitre, is a species of small sea snail, marine gastropod mollusk in the family Costellariidae, also known as the ribbed miters.

== Description ==
The length of the shell attains 15.6 mm.

(Original description) The shell is acuminately ovate. The spire is somewhat turreted and longitudinally ribbed. The ribs are narrow, flat, rather close-set, slightly granulated towards the base and transversely impressly striated. The shell is orange yellow, ornamented with a purple band in the interstices between the ribs. The columella is five-plaited.

== Distribution ==
This species occurs in the Caribbean Sea.
