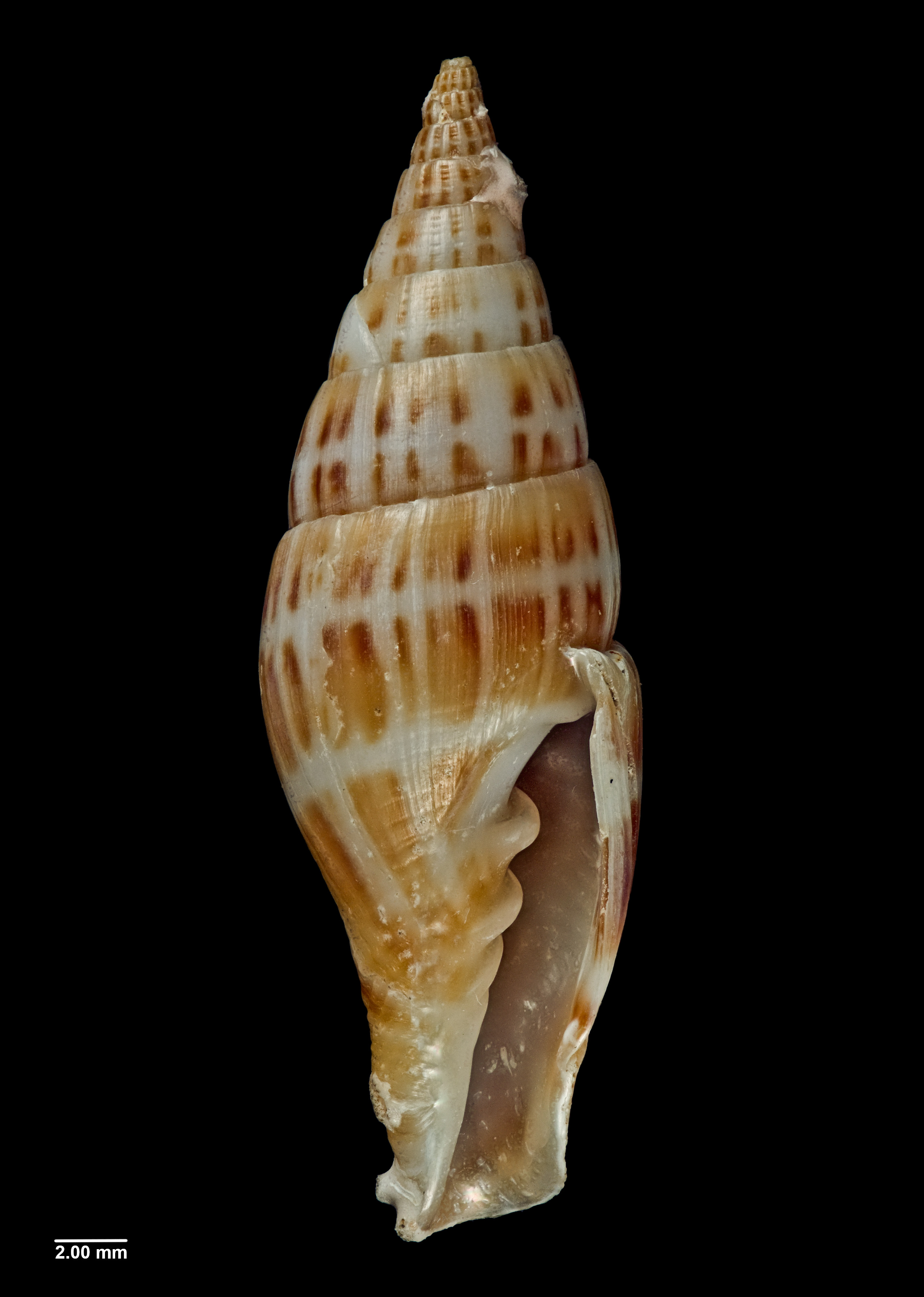
- Holotype

Scientific classification
- Kingdom: Animalia
- Phylum: Mollusca
- Class: Gastropoda
- Subclass: Caenogastropoda
- Order: Neogastropoda
- Superfamily: Turbinelloidea
- Family: Costellariidae
- Genus: Vexillena
- Species: V. choslenae

Binomial name
- Vexillena choslenae (Cernohorsky, 1982)

Synonyms
- Pusia choslenae (Cernohorsky, 1982); Pusia (Vexillena) choslenae (Cernohorsky, 1982); Vexillum (Costellaria) choslenae Cernohorsky, 1982; Vexillum choslenae Cernohorsky, 1982

= Vexillena choslenae =

Species of gastropod

Vexillena choslenae is a species of sea snail, a marine gastropod mollusk, in the family Costellariidae, the ribbed miters.

== Distribution ==
This species occurs in New Caledonia.
