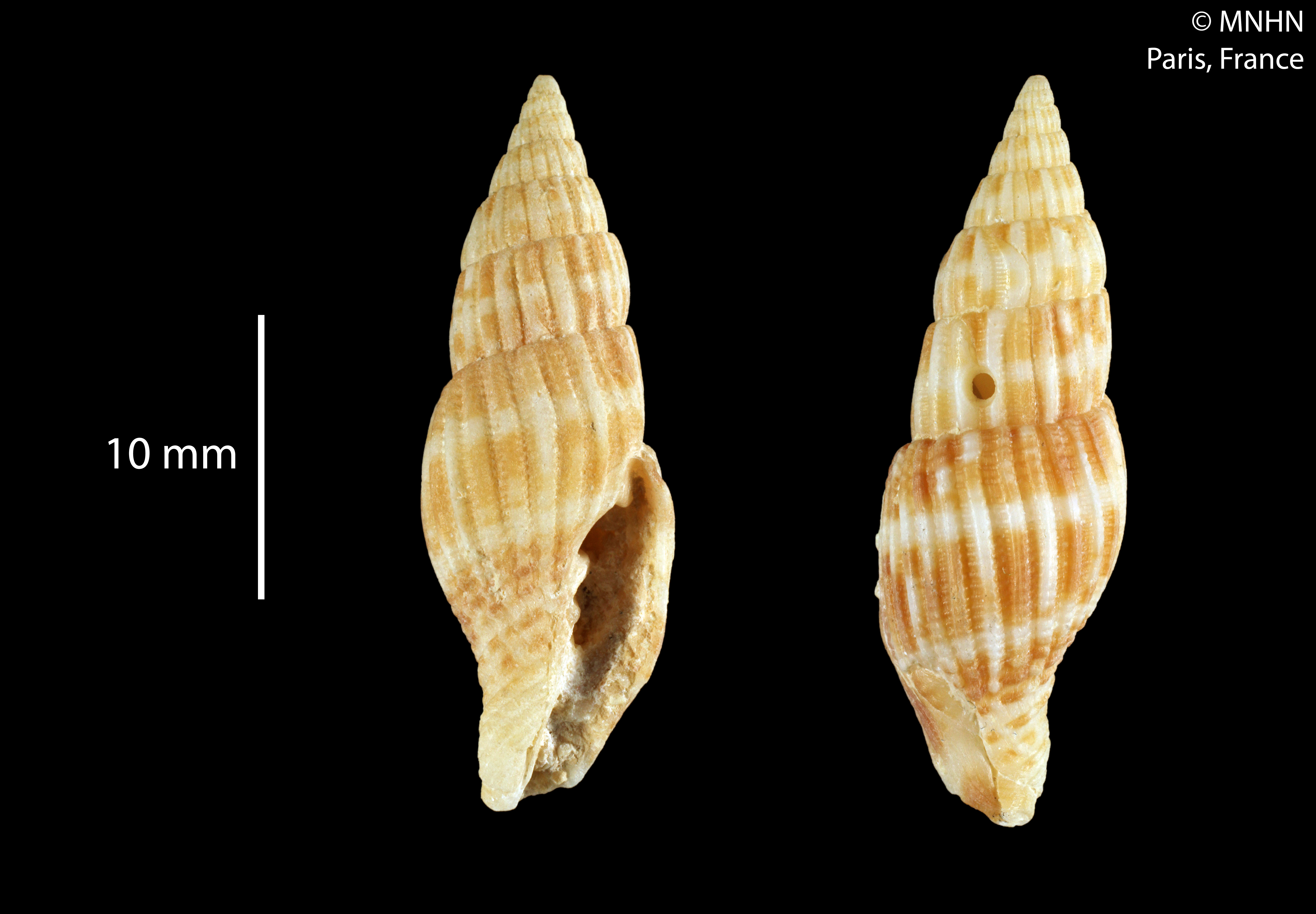
- Shell of Vexillena vicmanoui (specimen at MNHN, Paris)

Scientific classification
- Kingdom: Animalia
- Phylum: Mollusca
- Class: Gastropoda
- Subclass: Caenogastropoda
- Order: Neogastropoda
- Superfamily: Turbinelloidea
- Family: Costellariidae
- Genus: Vexillena
- Species: V. vicmanoui

Binomial name
- Vexillena vicmanoui (H. Turner & Marrow, 2001)

Synonyms
- Pusia (Vexillena) vicmanoui (H. Turner & Marrow, 2001); Pusia vicmanoui (H. Turner & Marrow, 2001) superseded combination; Vexillum (Costellaria) vicmanoui H. Turner & Marrow, 2001; Vexillum vicmanoui H. Turner & Marrow, 2001

= Vexillena vicmanoui =

Species of gastropod

Vexillena vicmanoui is a species of sea snail, a marine gastropod mollusk, in the family Costellariidae, the ribbed miters.

== Distribution ==
This species occurs off the Austral Islands, French Polynesia.
