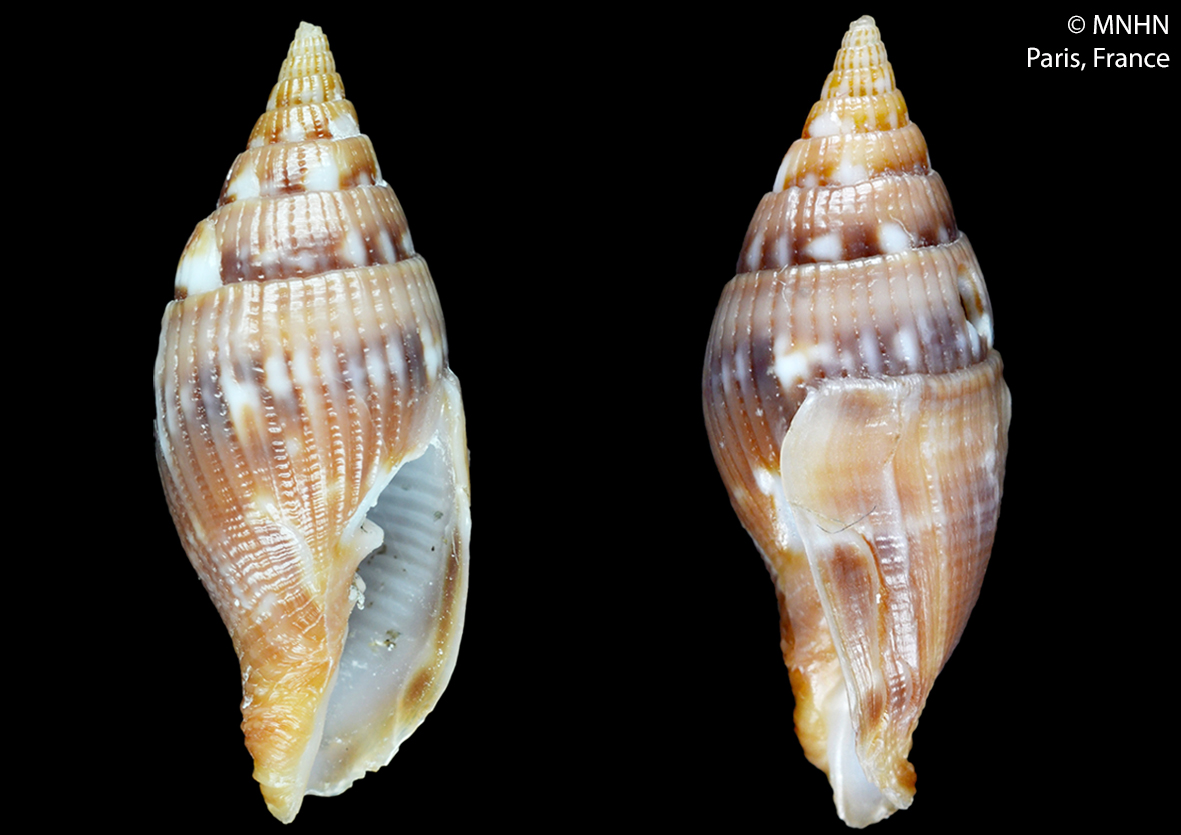
- Shell of Vexillena jenyai (holotype at MNHN, Paris)

Scientific classification
- Kingdom: Animalia
- Phylum: Mollusca
- Class: Gastropoda
- Subclass: Caenogastropoda
- Order: Neogastropoda
- Superfamily: Turbinelloidea
- Family: Costellariidae
- Genus: Vexillena
- Species: V. jenyai

Binomial name
- Vexillena jenyai Fedosov, Herrmann & Bouchet, 2017

Synonyms
- Pusia (Vexillena) jenyai Fedosov, Herrmann & Bouchet, 2017; Pusia jenyai Fedosov, Herrmann & Bouchet, 2017 superseded combination

= Vexillena jenyai =

Species of gastropod

Vexillena jenyai is a species of sea snail, a marine gastropod mollusk, in the family Costellariidae, the ribbed miters.

== Description ==
The length of the shell attains 23.6 mm.

== Distribution ==
This species occurs in the Coral Sea and on the Chesterfield Reefs, New Caledonia.
