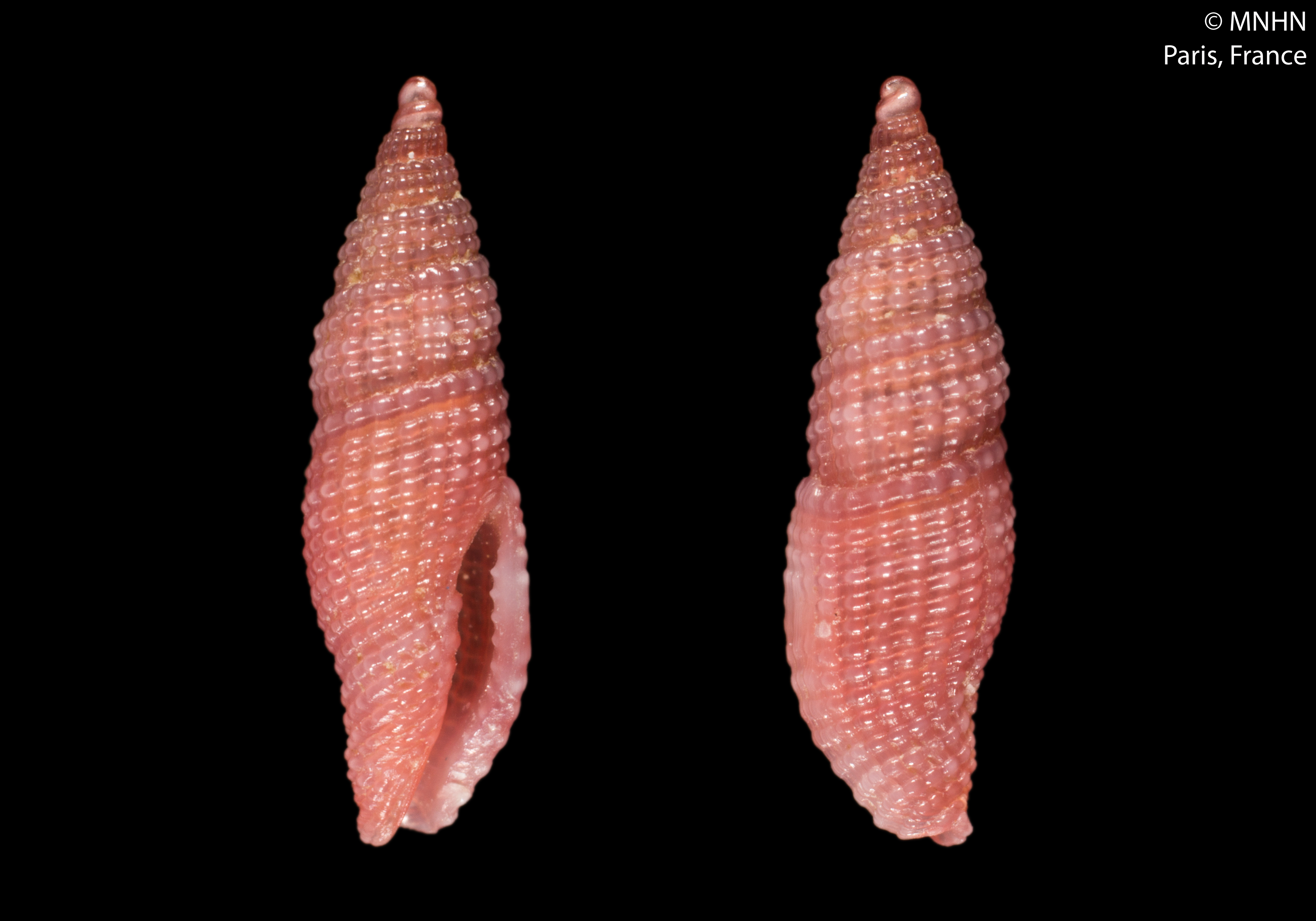
- Thala pembaensis

Scientific classification
- Kingdom: Animalia
- Phylum: Mollusca
- Class: Gastropoda
- Subclass: Caenogastropoda
- Order: Neogastropoda
- Superfamily: Turbinelloidea
- Family: Costellariidae
- Genus: Thala; H. Adams & A. Adams, 1853

Type species
- Mitra mirifica Reeve, 1845

Synonyms
- Mitra (Thala) H. Adams & A. Adams, 1853; Turricula (Thala) H. Adams & A. Adams, 1853 ·

= Thala (gastropod) =

Genus of gastropods

Thala is a genus of sea snails, marine gastropod mollusks in the family Costellariidae.

== Species ==
Species within the genus Thala include:

- Thala abelai Rosenberg & Salisbury, 2014
- Thala adamsi Rosenberg & Salisbury, 2003
- Thala angiostoma Pease, 1868
- Thala aubryi Turner, Gori & Salisbury, 2007
- † Thala burdigalensis Peyrot, 1928
- Thala cernica (Sowerby II, 1874)
- Thala evelynae Rosenberg & Salisbury, 2014
- Thala exilis (Reeve, 1845)
- Thala exquisita Garrett, 1872
- Thala gloriae Rosenberg & Salisbury, 2003
- Thala gorii Rosenberg & Salisbury, 2003
- Thala hilli Rosenberg & Salisbury, 2007
- Thala jaculanda (Gould, 1860)
- Thala kawabei Herrmann & Chino, 2015
- Thala kilburni Rosenberg & Salisbury, 2014
- Thala lillicoi Rosenberg & Salisbury, 2007
- Thala maldivensis Turner, Gori & Salisbury, 2007
- Thala malvacea Jousseaume, 1898
- Thala manolae Turner, Gori & Salisbury, 2007
- Thala merrilli Rosenberg & Salisbury, 2014
- Thala milium (Reeve, 1845)
- Thala minagaorum Herrmann & Chino, 2015
- Thala mirifica (Reeve, 1845)
- Thala ogasarawana Pilsbry, 1904
- Thala pallida Rosenberg & Salisbury, 2014
- † Thala partschi (Hörnes, 1852)
- Thala pembaensis Herrmann & Gori, 2012
- Thala rara Poppe & Tagaro, 2026
- Thala recurva (Reeve, 1845)
- Thala roseata (A. Adams, 1855)
- Thala ruggeriae Rosenberg & Salisbury, 2014
- Thala secalina (Gould, 1860)
- Thala simulans (Martens, 1880)
- Thala suduirauti Rosenberg & Salisbury, 2014
- Thala todilla (Mighels, 1845)
- Thala turneri Salisbury & Gori, 2013
- Thala violacea Garrett, 1872

Species brought into synonymy

- Thala africana Rolàn & Fernandes, 1996: synonym of Mitromica africana (Rolàn & Fernandes, 1996)
- Thala alba Pease, 1868: synonym of Mitra typha Reeve, 1845: synonym of Carinomitra typha (Reeve, 1845)
- Thala ceylanica Preston, 1904: synonym of Thala jaculanda (Gould, 1860)
- Thala crassa (Simone, 1995): synonym of Nodicostellaria crassa (Simone, 1995)
- Thala decaryi (Dautzenberg, 1932): synonym of Mitromica decaryi (Dautzenberg, 1932)
- Thala esperanza Leal & Moore, 1993: synonym of Mitromica esperanza Leal & Moore, 1993
- Thala floridana (Dall, 1884): synonym of Mitromica foveata (G. B. Sowerby II, 1874)
- Thala exquisita (Garrett, 1873): synonym of Vexillum (Pusia) exquisitum (Garrett, 1873)
- Thala foveata (G.B. Sowerby II, 1874): synonym of Mitromica foveata (G.B. Sowerby II, 1874)
- Thala gratiosa (Reeve, 1845): synonym of Mitromica gratiosa (Reeve, 1845)
- Thala illecebra (Melvill, 1927): synonym of Thala milium (Reeve, 1845)
- Thala jacalanda [sic]: synonym of Thala jaculanda (Gould, 1860)
- Thala jeancateae Sphon, 1969: synonym of Mitromica jeancateae (Sphon, 1969)
- Thala maxmarrowi Cernohorsky, 1980: synonym of Thaluta maxmarrowi (Cernohorsky, 1980)
- † Thala obsoleta (Brocchi, 1814): synonym of † Bellardithala obsoleta (Brocchi, 1814)
- Thala ogasarawana [sic]: synonym of Thala ogasawarana Pilsbry, 1904
- Thala saltata (Pease, 1865): synonym of Carinomitra saltata (Pease, 1865)
- Thala solitaria (C. B. Adams, 1852): synonym of Mitromica solitaria (C. B. Adams, 1852)
