= Thala maldivensis =

Scientific classification
- Kingdom: Animalia
- Phylum: Mollusca
- Class: Gastropoda
- Subclass: Caenogastropoda
- Order: Neogastropoda
- Family: Costellariidae
- Genus: Thala
- Species: T. maldivensis

Binomial name
- Thala maldivensis Turner, Gori & Salisbury, 2007

Species of gastropod

Thala maldivensis is a species of small sea snail, a marine gastropod mollusk. It resides in the family Costellariidae, otherwise referred to as the ribbed miters.

== Description ==
This sea snail can be easily visually mistaken for Vexillum fraudator, due to their visual similarity.

== Distribution ==
This marine species occurs exclusively from the Maldives.
