= Caribbonus macrocephala =

Scientific classification
- Kingdom: Animalia
- Phylum: Mollusca
- Class: Gastropoda
- Subclass: Caenogastropoda
- Order: Neogastropoda
- Superfamily: Turbinelloidea
- Family: Costellariidae
- Genus: Caribbonus
- Species: C. macrocephala

Binomial name
- Caribbonus macrocephala Fedosov, Bouchet, Dekkers, Gori, S.-I Huang, Kantor, Lemarcis, Marrow, Ratti, Rosenberg, R. Salisbury, Zvonareva & Puillandre, 2025

Species of gastropod

Caribbonus macrocephala is a species of small sea snail, marine gastropod mollusk in the family Costellariidae, the ribbed miters.

== Distribution ==
This marine species occurs off Guadeloupe.
