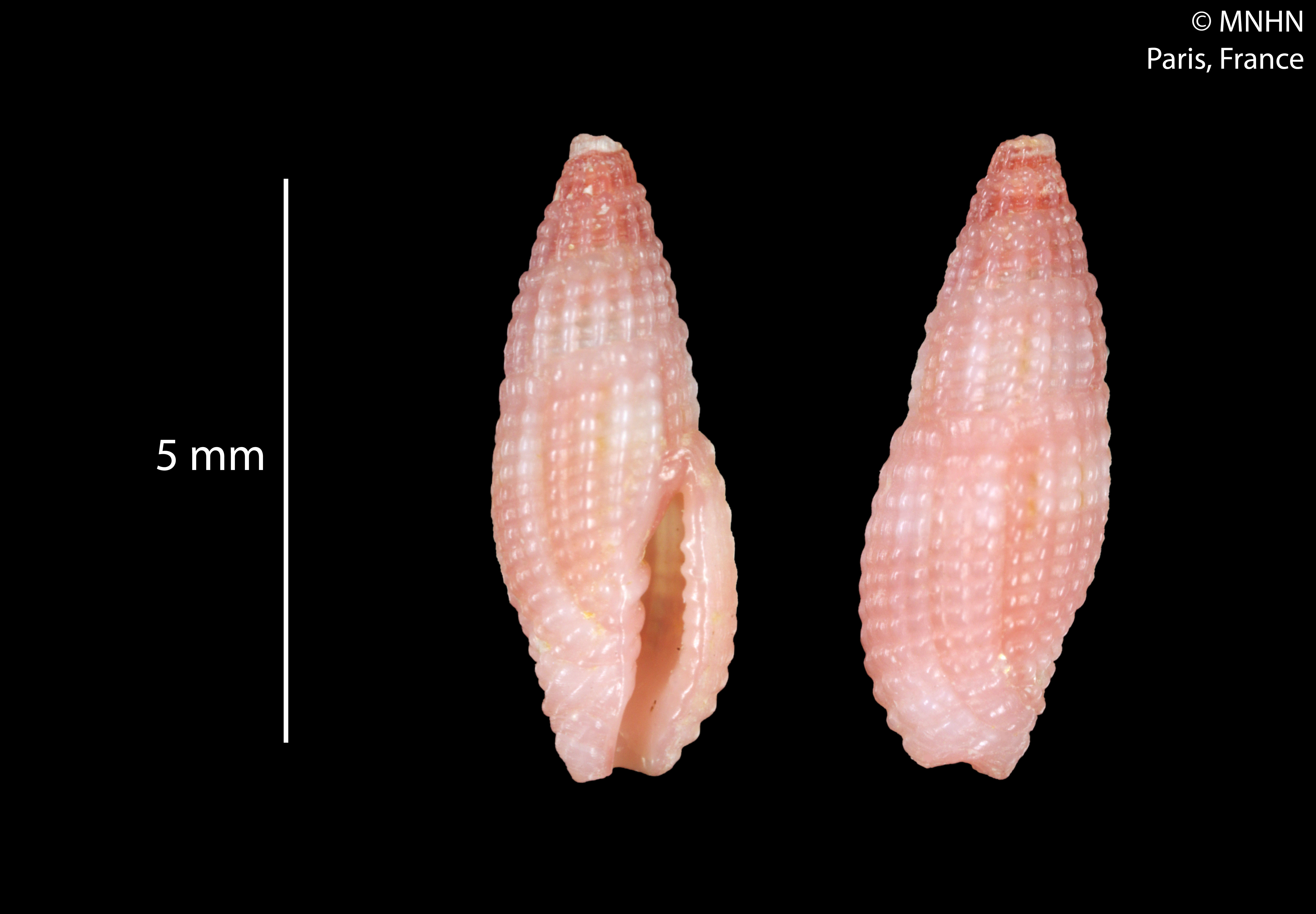
- Shell of Thala ruggeriae (specimen at MNHN, Paris)

Scientific classification
- Kingdom: Animalia
- Phylum: Mollusca
- Class: Gastropoda
- Subclass: Caenogastropoda
- Order: Neogastropoda
- Superfamily: Turbinelloidea
- Family: Costellariidae
- Genus: Thala
- Species: T. ruggeriae

Binomial name
- Thala ruggeriae Rosenberg & Salisbury, 2014

= Thala ruggeriae =

Species of gastropod

Thala ruggeriae is a species of sea snail, a marine gastropod mollusk, in the family Costellariidae, the ribbed miters.

== Description ==
The length of the shell attains 9 mm.

== Distribution ==
This marine species occurs off Zanzibar. This species was formerly identified as Thala Exilis by W. O. Cernohorsky in 1978, but several variations between the two were found after since then.
