= Vexillum brunneolinea =

Scientific classification
- Kingdom: Animalia
- Phylum: Mollusca
- Class: Gastropoda
- Subclass: Caenogastropoda
- Order: Neogastropoda
- Family: Costellariidae
- Genus: Vexillum
- Species: V. brunneolinea

Binomial name
- Vexillum brunneolinea Rosenberg & Salisbury, 1991

Synonyms
- Vexillum (Costellaria) brunneolinea Rosenberg & R. Salisbury, 1991

Species of gastropod

Vexillum brunneolinea is a species of small sea snail, marine gastropod mollusk in the family Costellariidae, the ribbed miters.

== Description ==
The length of the shell attains 25.5 mm, its diameter 7.5 mm.

== Distribution ==
This marine species occurs off Palau, Western Pacific.
