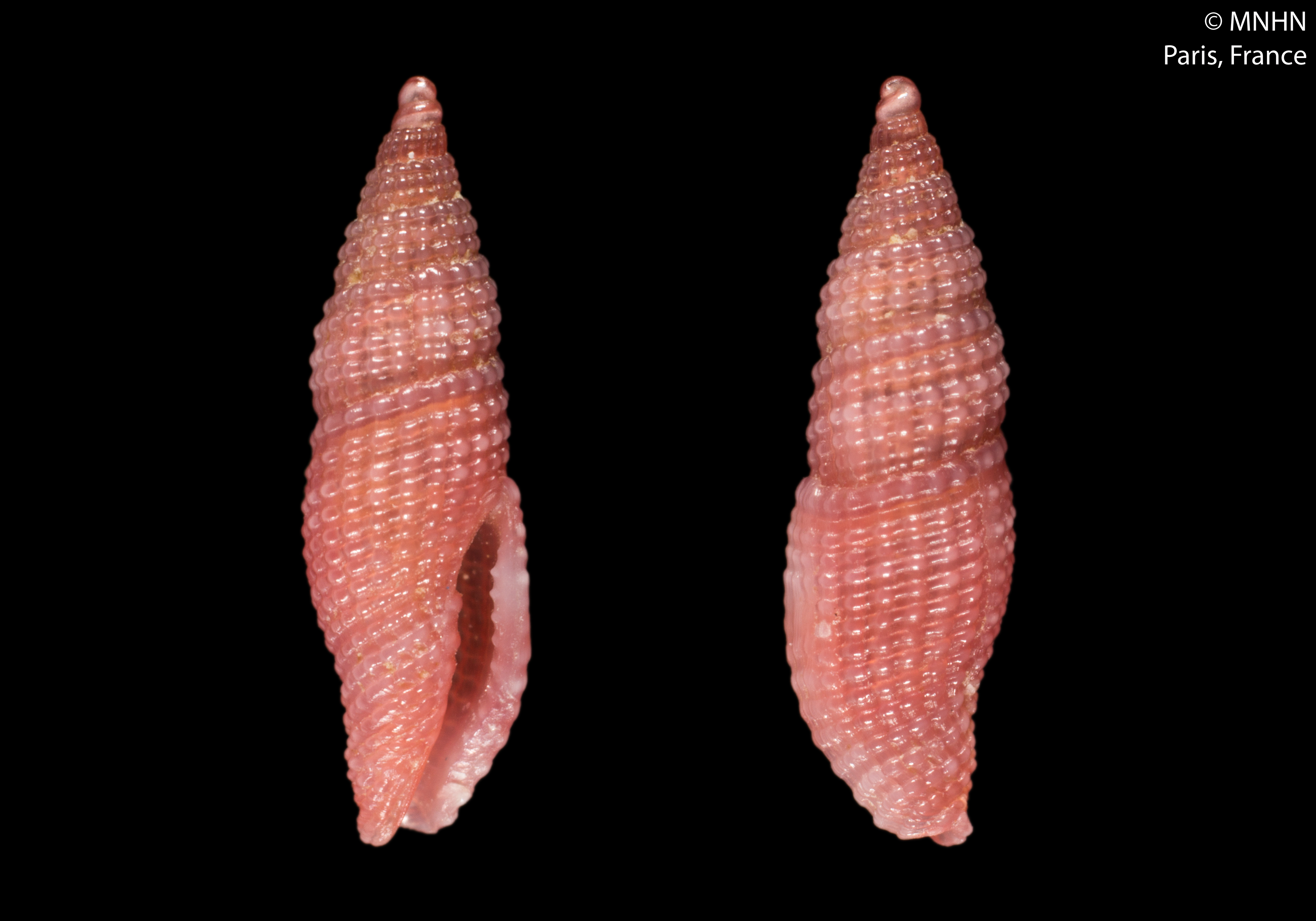
- Shell of Thala pembaensis (holotype at MNHN, Paris)

Scientific classification
- Kingdom: Animalia
- Phylum: Mollusca
- Class: Gastropoda
- Subclass: Caenogastropoda
- Order: Neogastropoda
- Family: Costellariidae
- Genus: Thala
- Species: T. pembaensis

Binomial name
- Thala pembaensis Herrmann & Gori, 2012

= Thala pembaensis =

Species of gastropod

Thala pembaensis is a species of small sea snail, marine gastropod mollusk in the family Costellariidae, the ribbed miters.

== Distribution ==
This marine species occurs off Mozambique.
