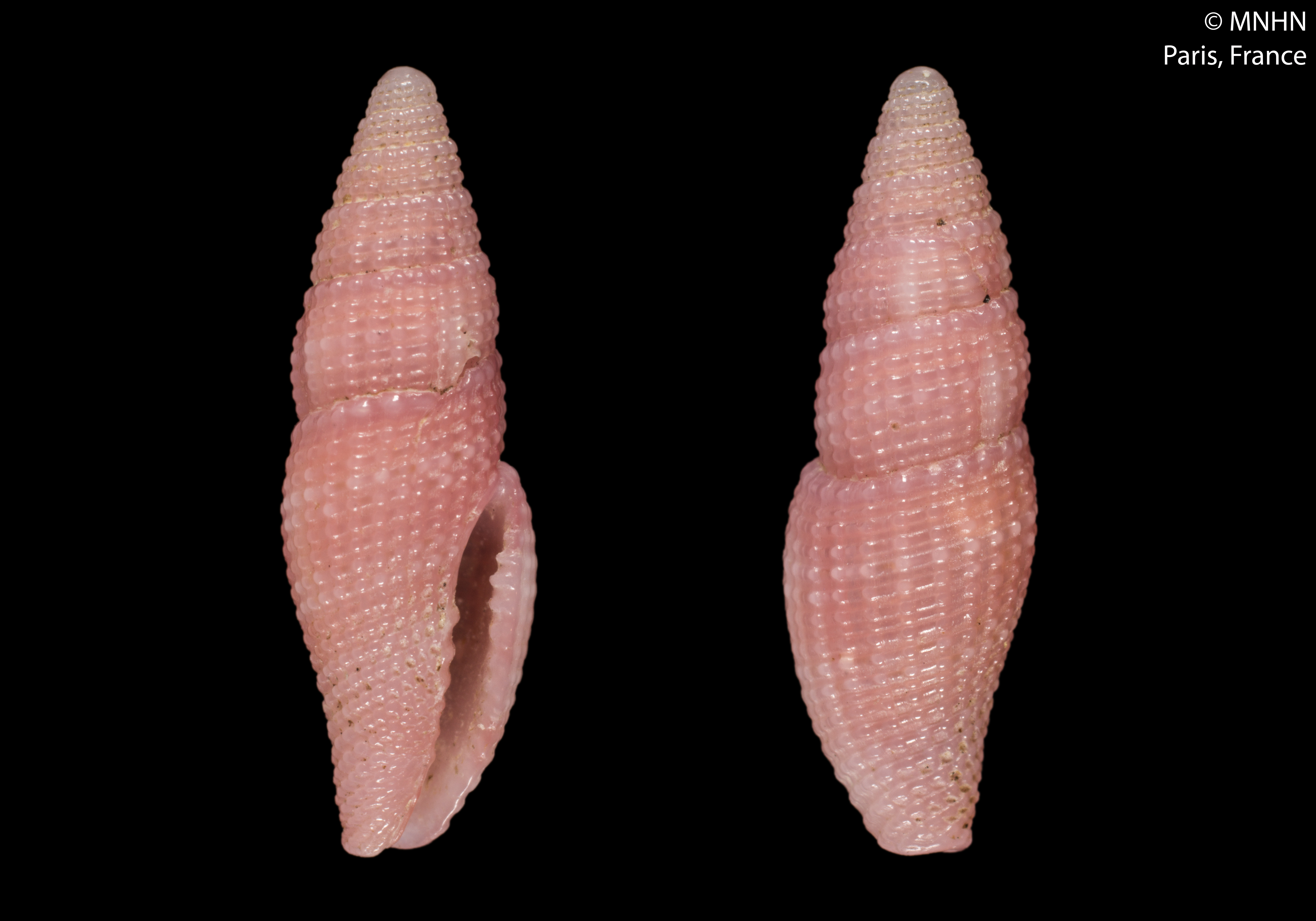
- Shell of Thala mirifica (lectotype at MNHN, Paris)

Scientific classification
- Kingdom: Animalia
- Phylum: Mollusca
- Class: Gastropoda
- Subclass: Caenogastropoda
- Order: Neogastropoda
- Family: Costellariidae
- Genus: Thala
- Species: T. mirifica

Binomial name
- Thala mirifica (Reeve, 1845)

Synonyms
- Mitra fusus Souverbie, 1876; Mitra mirifica Reeve, 1845 (original combination)

= Thala mirifica =

Species of gastropod

Thala mirifica is a species of small sea snail, marine gastropod mollusk in the family Costellariidae, the ribbed miters.

== Description ==
The length of the shell attains 9 mm.

== Distribution ==
This marine species occurs off the Philippines.
