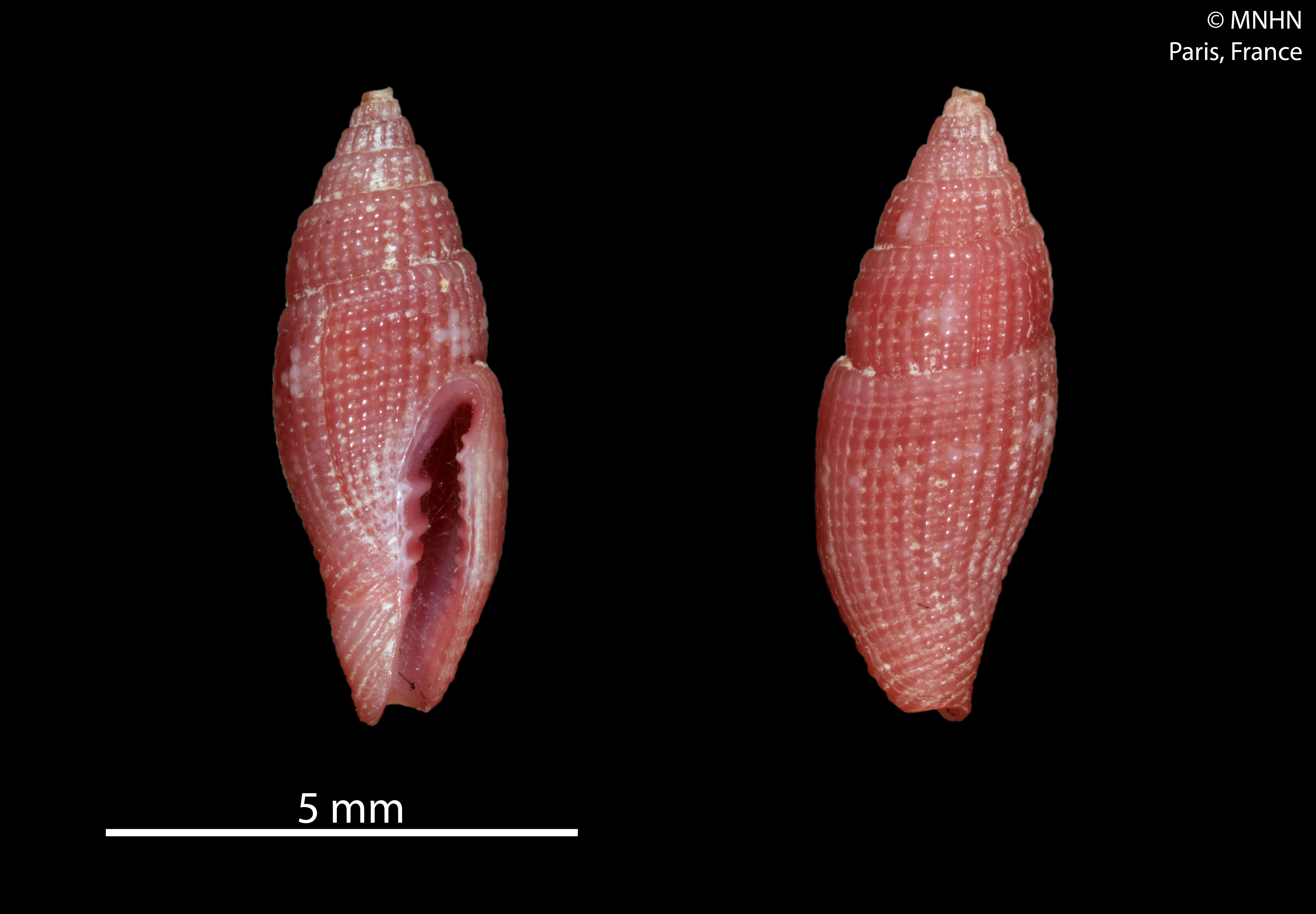
- Shell of Thala evelynae (paratype at MNHN. Paris)

Scientific classification
- Kingdom: Animalia
- Phylum: Mollusca
- Class: Gastropoda
- Subclass: Caenogastropoda
- Order: Neogastropoda
- Superfamily: Turbinelloidea
- Family: Costellariidae
- Genus: Thala
- Species: T. evelynae

Binomial name
- Thala evelynae Rosenberg & Salisbury, 2014

= Thala evelynae =

Species of gastropod

Thala evelynae is a species of sea snail, a marine gastropod mollusk, in the family Costellariidae, the ribbed miters.

== Description ==
The length of the shell attains 6.2 mm.

== Distribution ==
This marine species occurs off the Philippines.
