= Thaluta takenoko =

Scientific classification
- Kingdom: Animalia
- Phylum: Mollusca
- Class: Gastropoda
- Subclass: Caenogastropoda
- Order: Neogastropoda
- Superfamily: Turbinelloidea
- Family: Costellariidae
- Genus: Thaluta
- Species: T. takenoko

Binomial name
- Thaluta takenoko Rosenberg & Callomon, 2004

Species of gastropod

Thaluta takenoko is a species of sea snail, a marine gastropod mollusk, in the family Costellariidae, the ribbed miters.
