= Thala ogasawarana =

Scientific classification
- Kingdom: Animalia
- Phylum: Mollusca
- Class: Gastropoda
- Subclass: Caenogastropoda
- Order: Neogastropoda
- Superfamily: Turbinelloidea
- Family: Costellariidae
- Genus: Thala
- Species: T. ogasawarana

Binomial name
- Thala ogasawarana Pilsbry, 1904

Synonyms
- Thala ogasarawana [sic]

Species of gastropod

Thala ogasawarana is a species of sea snail, a marine gastropod mollusk, in the family Costellariidae, the ribbed miters.

== Distribution ==
This species occurs in the following locations:

- Ogasawara Islands
- Wakayama Prefecture
