= Trivellona marlowi =

Scientific classification
- Kingdom: Animalia
- Phylum: Mollusca
- Class: Gastropoda
- Subclass: Caenogastropoda
- Order: Littorinimorpha
- Family: Triviidae
- Genus: Trivellona
- Species: T. marlowi

Binomial name
- Trivellona marlowi (Rosenberg & Finley, 2001)

Synonyms
- Trivia marlowi Rosenberg & Finley, 2001 (basionym)

Species of gastropod

Trivellona marlowi is a species of small sea snail, a marine gastropod mollusk in the family Triviidae, the false cowries or trivias.
