= Thala jaculanda =

Scientific classification
- Kingdom: Animalia
- Phylum: Mollusca
- Class: Gastropoda
- Subclass: Caenogastropoda
- Order: Neogastropoda
- Family: Costellariidae
- Genus: Thala
- Species: T. jaculanda

Binomial name
- Thala jaculanda (Gould, 1860)

Synonyms
- Mitra adumbrata Souverbie, 1876; Thala ceylanica Preston, 1904

Species of gastropod

Thala jaculanda is a species of small sea snail, marine gastropod mollusk in the family Costellariidae, the ribbed miters.
