= Thala merrilli =

Scientific classification
- Kingdom: Animalia
- Phylum: Mollusca
- Class: Gastropoda
- Subclass: Caenogastropoda
- Order: Neogastropoda
- Superfamily: Turbinelloidea
- Family: Costellariidae
- Genus: Thala
- Species: T. merrilli

Binomial name
- Thala merrilli Rosenberg & Salisbury, 2014

Species of gastropod

Thala merrilli is a species of sea snail, a marine gastropod mollusk, in the family Costellariidae, the ribbed miters.
