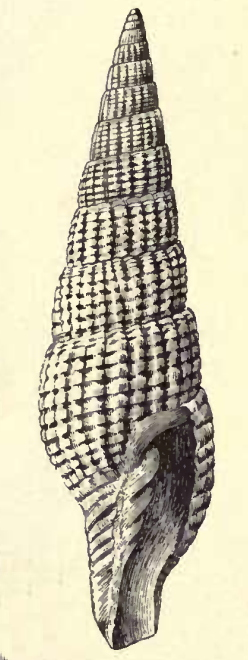
- Shell of Caribbonus styria (holotype)

Scientific classification
- Kingdom: Animalia
- Phylum: Mollusca
- Class: Gastropoda
- Subclass: Caenogastropoda
- Order: Neogastropoda
- Superfamily: Turbinelloidea
- Family: Costellariidae
- Genus: Caribbonus
- Species: C. styria

Binomial name
- Caribbonus styria (Dall, 1889)

Synonyms
- Mitra (Costellaria) styria Dall, 1889 (basionym); Mitra styria Dall, 1889 (original combination); Vexillum (Costellaria) styria (Dall, 1889); Vexillum styria (Dall, 1889) superseded combination; Vexillum styrium (Dall, 1889)

= Caribbonus styria =

Species of gastropod

Caribbonus styria is a species of small sea snail, marine gastropod mollusk in the family Costellariidae, the ribbed miters.

== Description ==
The length of the shell attains 19 mm, its diameter 5 mm.

(Original description) The shell is pale yellowish, white, or pinkish, sometimes with a faint peripheral brownish band, or mottled brown and white. The shell is elongated, acute, cancellately sculptured. The protoconch is elongated, pointed, glassy, pale brownish, smooth, consisting of about three and a half whorls. The other whorls number 10-14. They are subconvex, with a distinct but not channelled suture. The axial sculpture shows about (on the body whorl) 25 slightly flexuous regular narrow even transverse ribs separated by wider interspaces, extending clear over the whorl. The spiral sculpture shows (behind the suture about 6-10) even threads, separated by squarely channelled narrower interspaces, crossing the ribs and with a tendency to form a nodule at the intersection. The siphonal canal is rather slender, with seven or eight strong spiral threads externally, which are crossed only by incremental lines. The tip of the siphonal canal is slightly recurved. Internally the outer lip is thin, unreflected, and smooth. Deeper in the aperture are 6-10 fine spiral elevated lirae, ending in the adult in as many little knobs. On the body whorl near the angle with the outer lip, at certain stages, is a single small elevated callus. Over the surface and on the column the callosity is thin. The columella has three well-defined plaits behind its own margin, the posterior the largest. The completely adult may have two more.

This species varies in the relative strength of the ribs and spiral threads, and the prominence of the intersections. Some specimens are more attenuated than others. The measurements of the description are taken from the most perfect specimen, but, judging from fragments, it attains a size one third larger, and the adult will be proportionally somewhat stouter.

== Distribution ==
This marine species occurs in the Gulf of Mexico off Havana, Barbados, St. Domingo, Grenada, Cape Florida and Georgia, USA.
