= Thala cernica =

Scientific classification
- Kingdom: Animalia
- Phylum: Mollusca
- Class: Gastropoda
- Subclass: Caenogastropoda
- Order: Neogastropoda
- Family: Costellariidae
- Genus: Thala
- Species: T. cernica

Binomial name
- Thala cernica (Sowerby II, 1874)

Synonyms
- Mitra cernica Sowerby II, 1874 (basionym)

Species of gastropod

Thala cernica is a species of small sea snail, marine gastropod mollusk in the family Costellariidae, the ribbed miters.

== Description ==
The rosy-orange shell is rather fusiform. The aperture equals the spire in length. The whorls are angulate at the suture. The body whorl becomes attenuate at the top. The outer lip is dentate inside. The superior teeth are elongate.

== Distribution ==
This species occurs in the Indian Ocean off Madagascar.
