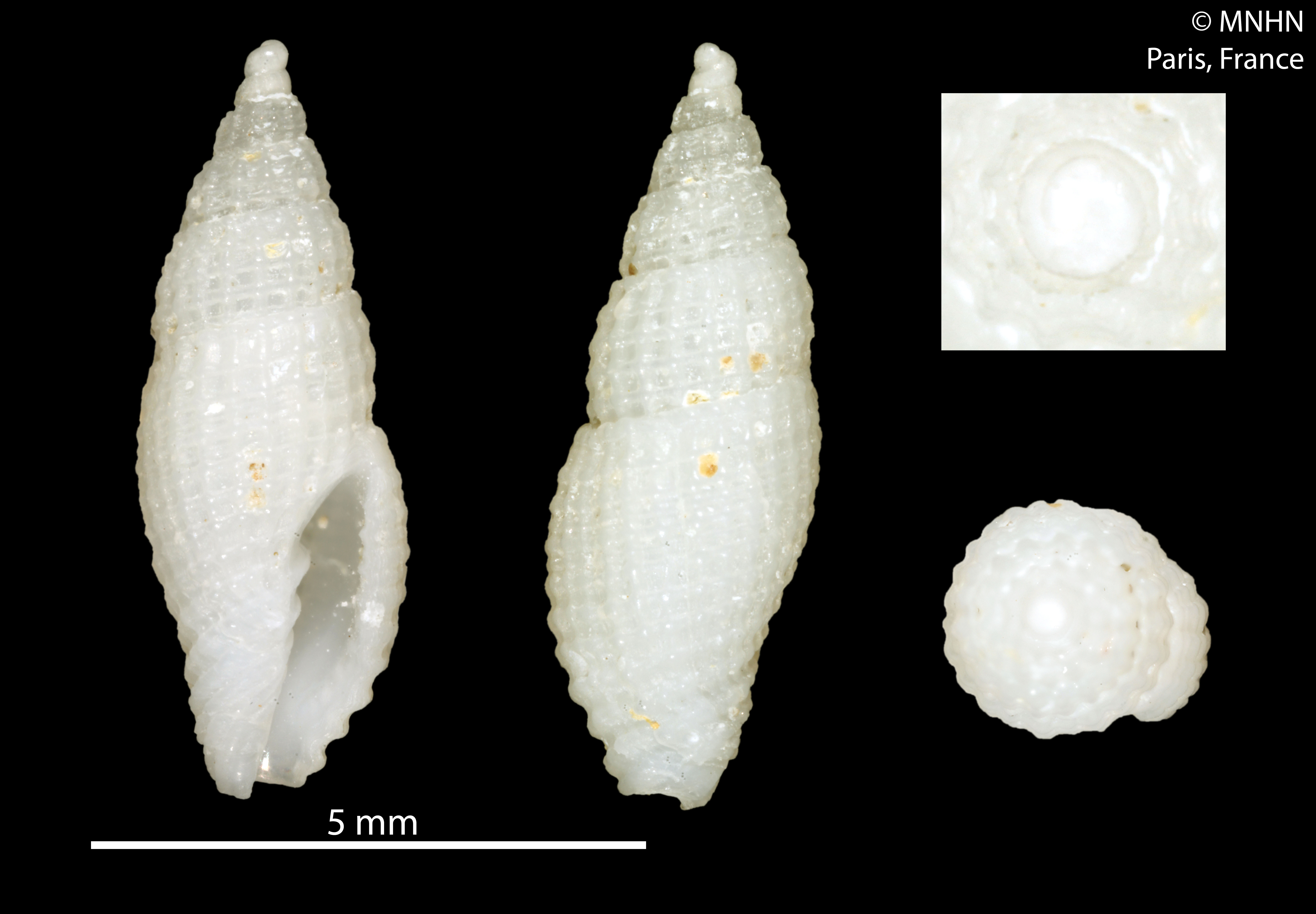
- Shell of Mitromica gallegoi (paratype at MNHN, Paris)

Scientific classification
- Kingdom: Animalia
- Phylum: Mollusca
- Class: Gastropoda
- Subclass: Caenogastropoda
- Order: Neogastropoda
- Superfamily: Turbinelloidea
- Family: Costellariidae
- Genus: Mitromica
- Species: M. gallegoi

Binomial name
- Mitromica gallegoi Rolán, Fernández-Garcés & H. G. Lee, 2010

= Mitromica gallegoi =

Species of gastropod

Mitromica gallegoi is a species of sea snail, a marine gastropod mollusk, in the family Costellariidae, the ribbed miters.

== Distribution ==
This species occurs in Nicaraguan part of the Caribbean Sea.
