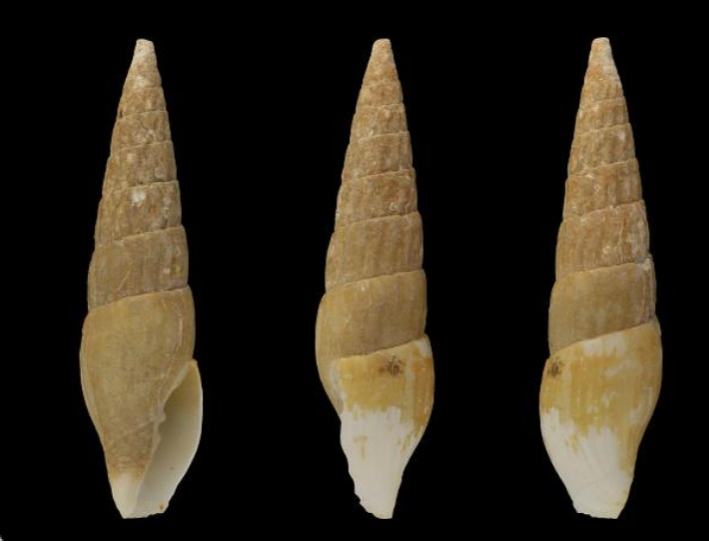
- Shell of Caribbonus bairdii (holotype at the Smithsonian Institution)

Scientific classification
- Kingdom: Animalia
- Phylum: Mollusca
- Class: Gastropoda
- Subclass: Caenogastropoda
- Order: Neogastropoda
- Superfamily: Turbinelloidea
- Family: Costellariidae
- Genus: Caribbonus
- Species: C. bairdii

Binomial name
- Caribbonus bairdii (Dall, 1889)

Synonyms
- Latiromitra bairdii (Dall, 1889); Mitra (Turris) bairdii Dall, 1889 (basionym); Turris bairdii W.H. Dall, 1889; Volutomitra bairdii (Dall, 1889)

= Caribbonus bairdii =

Species of gastropod

Caribbonus bairdii is a species of sea snail, a marine gastropod mollusk in the family Volutomitridae.

== Description ==
The length of the shell attains 35 mm, its diameter 9 mm.

(Original description) The shell is waxen gray or greenish, elongated and acute. It contains ten or eleven flattened whorls; the protoconch ? (wanting). The sculpture consists on the earlier whorls of up to fourteen little raised hardly fiexuous transverse waves extending clear across the whorls, rounded, equal throughout their length, and separated by shallow slightly wider interspaces. This transverse sculpture becomes gradually fainter, and entirely obsolete on the body whorl. This body whorl in the adult seems only marked by the fine and slightly irregular incremental lines which give to the thin smooth pale brown and slightly fibrous epidermis a silky appearance. The spiral sculpture consists of numerous very fine close half-obsolete grooves or scratches, and six or seven deeper stronger grooves encircling the siphonal canal. The whorls are mostly flattened, the last slightly rounded. The suture is distinct and appressed. The aperture is white. The outer lip is thin, sharp, with no lirae on the typical specimen. The columella contains three plaits, the anterior one faint. The siphonal canal is short, nearly as wide as the aperture and hardly recurved. The siphonal fasciole is distinct.

The soft parts are whitish, with no operculum.

== Distribution ==
This marine species was found off Louisiana, USA.
