= Thala adamsi =

Scientific classification
- Kingdom: Animalia
- Phylum: Mollusca
- Class: Gastropoda
- Subclass: Caenogastropoda
- Order: Neogastropoda
- Family: Costellariidae
- Genus: Thala
- Species: T. adamsi

Binomial name
- Thala adamsi Rosenberg & Salisbury, 2003

Species of gastropod

Thala adamsi is a species of small sea snail, marine gastropod mollusk in the family Costellariidae, the ribbed miters.
