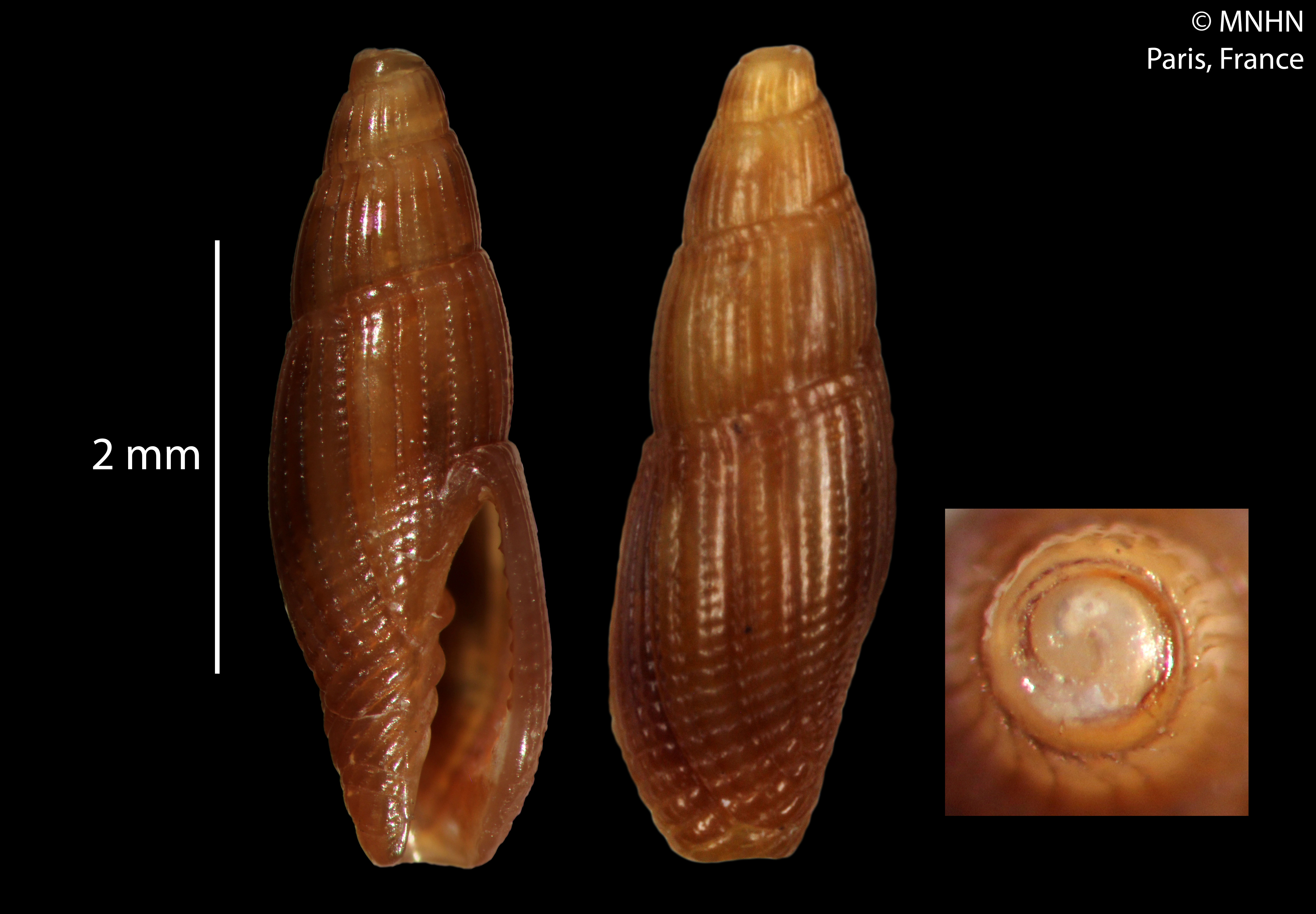
- Shell of Mitromica esperanza (paratype at MNHN, Paris)

Scientific classification
- Kingdom: Animalia
- Phylum: Mollusca
- Class: Gastropoda
- Subclass: Caenogastropoda
- Order: Neogastropoda
- Superfamily: Turbinelloidea
- Family: Costellariidae
- Genus: Mitromica; S. S. Berry, 1958

Type species
- Mitra solitaria C. B. Adams, 1852

= Mitromica =

Genus of sea snails

Mitromica is a genus of small sea snails, marine gastropod mollusks in the family Costellariidae.

== Species ==
Species within the genus Mitromica include:

- Mitromica africana (Rolàn & Fernandes, 1996)
- Mitromica calliaqua Rosenberg & Salisbury, 2003
- Mitromica carildae Espinosa & Ortea, 2018
- Mitromica christamariae Salisbury & Schniebs, 2009
- Mitromica cosmani Rosenberg & Salisbury, 2003
- Mitromica dajjami Espinosa & Ortea, 2018
- Mitromica decaryi (Dautzenberg, 1932)
- Mitromica dicksoni Rosenberg & Salisbury, 2003
- Mitromica esperanza Leal & Moore, 1993
- Mitromica foveata (G.B. Sowerby II, 1874)
- Mitromica gallegoi Rolán, Fernández-Garcés & Lee, 2010
- Mitromica gratiosa (Reeve, 1845)
- Mitromica jeancateae (Sphon, 1969)
- Mitromica nataliae Espinosa & Ortea, 2018
- Mitromica omanensis Herrmann & Gori, 2012
- Mitromica oryza Rosenberg & Salisbury, 2003
- Mitromica solitaria (C. B. Adams, 1852)
- Mitromica surcabera Espinosa & Ortea, 2018
- Mitromica torobella Espinosa & Ortea, 2018
- Mitromica veguera Espinosa & Ortea, 2018
- Mitromica williamsae Rosenberg & Salisbury, 2003

== Classification ==
Biota > Animalia (Kingdom) > Mollusca (Phylum) > Gastropoda (Class) > Caenogastropoda (Subclass) > Neogastropoda (Order) > Turbinelloidea (Superfamily) > Costellariidae (Family) > Mitromica (Genus)
