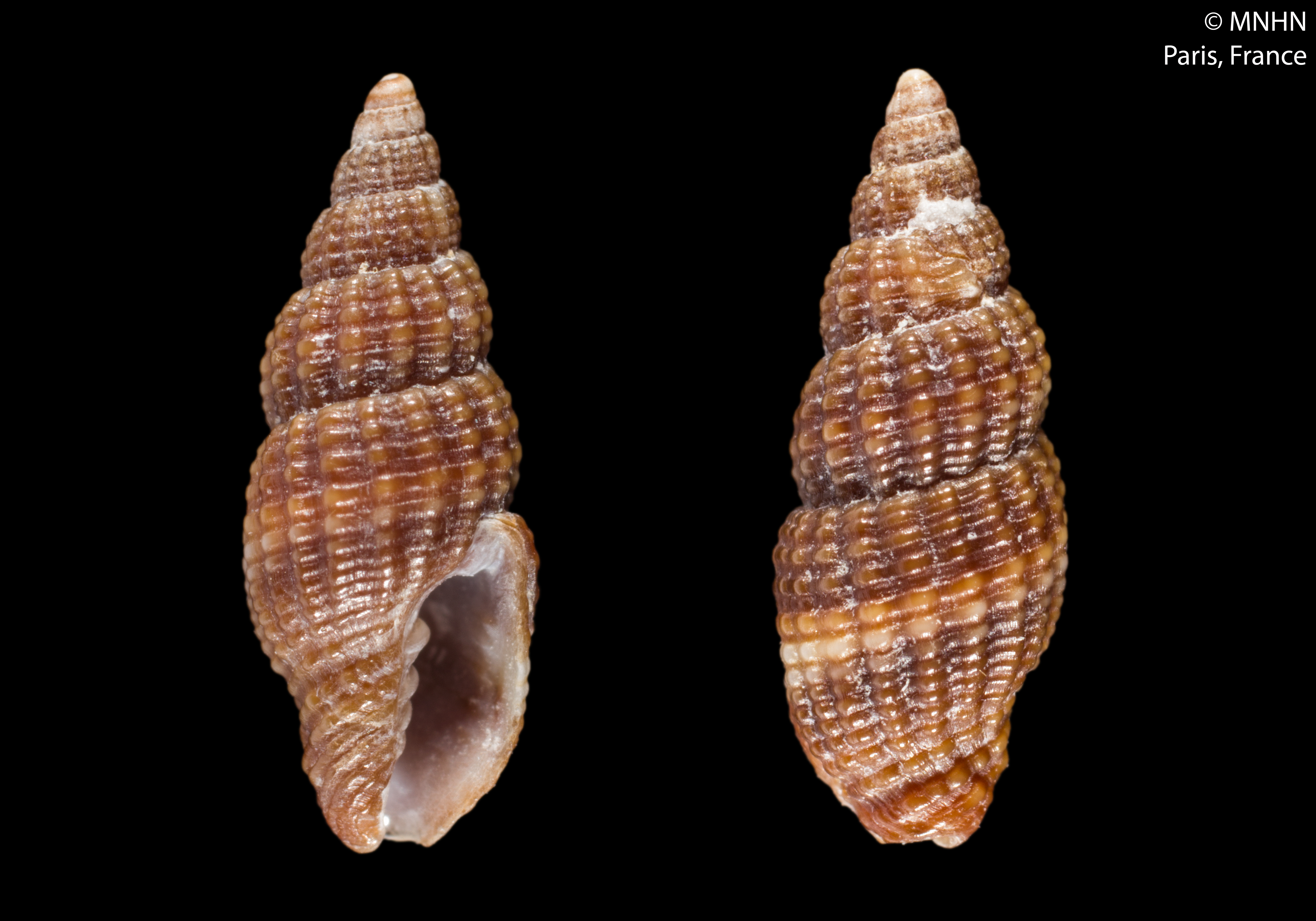
- Shell of Mitromica omanensis (holotype at MNHN, Paris)

Scientific classification
- Kingdom: Animalia
- Phylum: Mollusca
- Class: Gastropoda
- Subclass: Caenogastropoda
- Order: Neogastropoda
- Superfamily: Turbinelloidea
- Family: Costellariidae
- Genus: Mitromica
- Species: M. omanensis

Binomial name
- Mitromica omanensis Herrmann & Gori, 2012

= Mitromica omanensis =

Species of gastropod

Mitromica omanensis is a species of sea snail, a marine gastropod mollusk, in the family Costellariidae, the ribbed miters.

== Description ==
The length of the shell attains 7.3 mm.

== Distribution ==
This marine species occurs in the Western Indian ocean, more specifically off the coast of Oman. Omanensis inhabits marine benthic environments, likely in deeper waters or specialized habitats often associated with rocky or sandy substrates, typical for this genus in the region.
