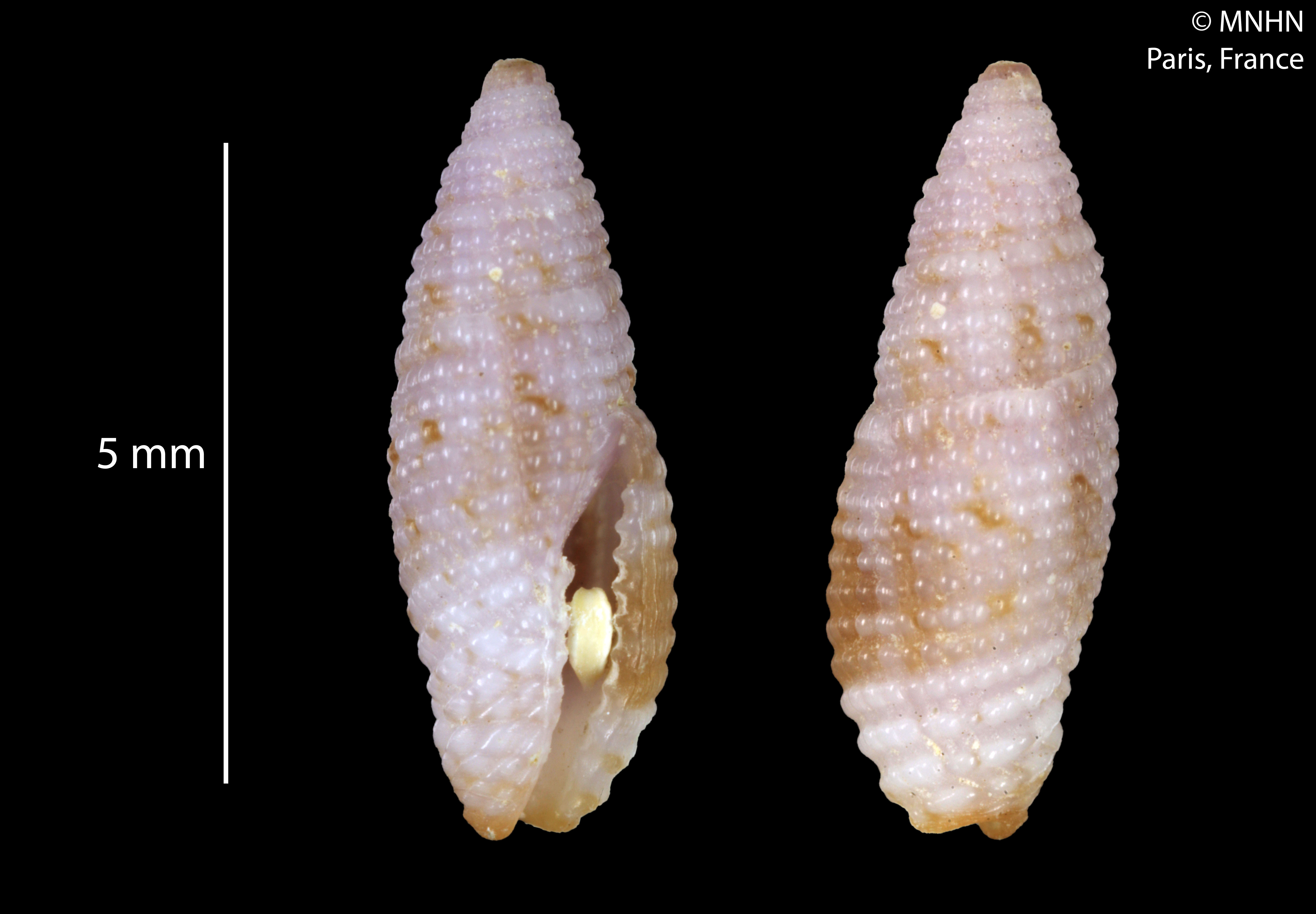

Scientific classification
- Kingdom: Animalia
- Phylum: Mollusca
- Class: Gastropoda
- Subclass: Caenogastropoda
- Order: Neogastropoda
- Family: Costellariidae
- Genus: Thala
- Species: T. gorii

Binomial name
- Thala gorii Rosenberg & Salisbury, 2003

= Thala gorii =

Species of gastropod

Thala gorii is a species of small sea snail, marine gastropod mollusk in the family Costellariidae, the ribbed miters.

== Description ==
The length of the shell attains 6 mm.

== Distribution ==
This marine species occurs off the Maldives.
