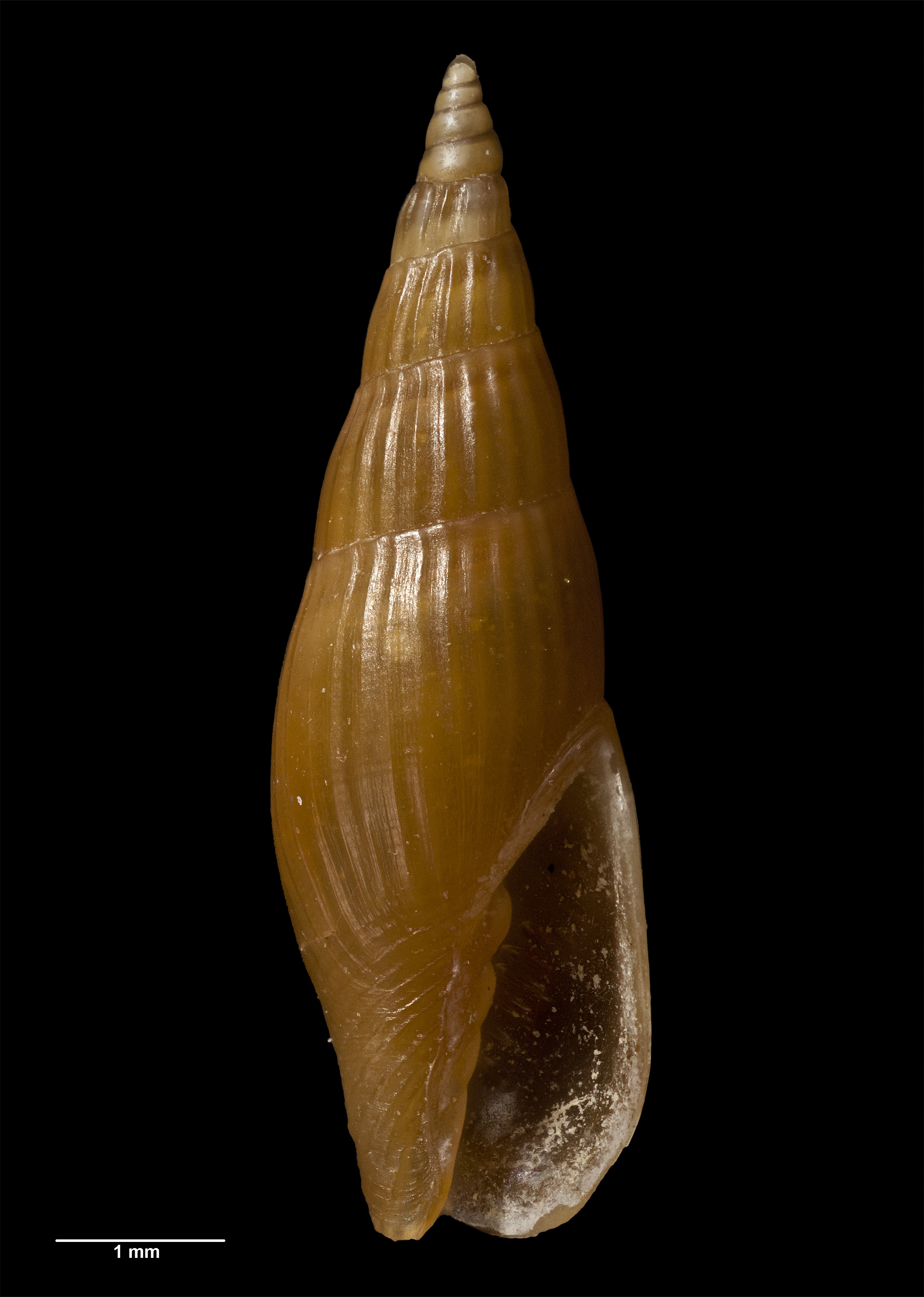
- T. maxmarrowi

Scientific classification
- Kingdom: Animalia
- Phylum: Mollusca
- Class: Gastropoda
- Subclass: Caenogastropoda
- Order: Neogastropoda
- Family: Costellariidae
- Genus: Thaluta; Rosenberg & Callomon, 2004

= Thaluta =

Genus of gastropods

Thaluta is a genus of small sea snail, marine gastropod mollusk in the family Costellariidae, the ribbed miters.

== Species ==
Species within the genus Thaluta include:

- Thaluta maxmarrowi
- Thaluta takenoko
