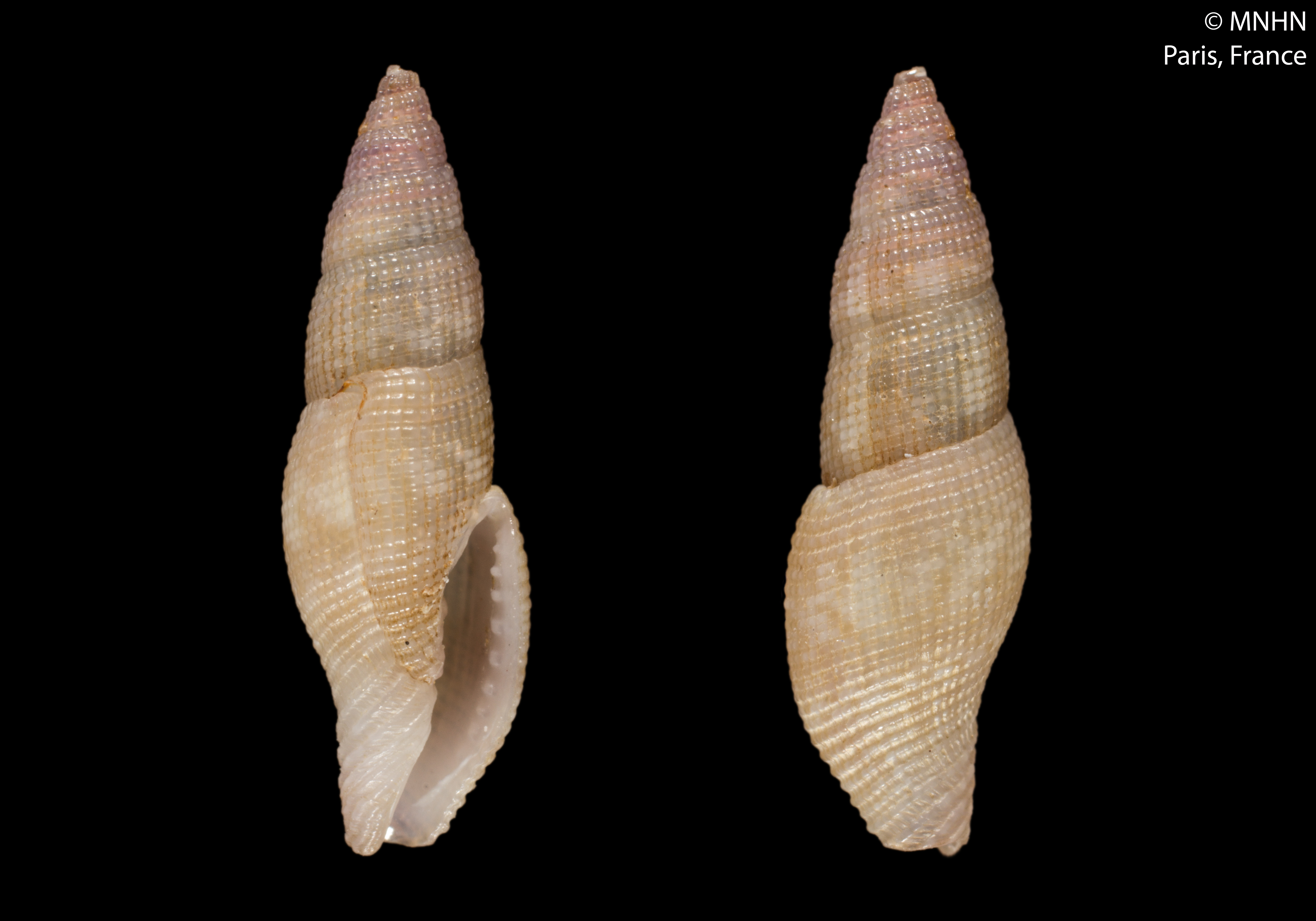
- Shell of Thala malvacea (syntype at MNHN, Paris)

Scientific classification
- Kingdom: Animalia
- Phylum: Mollusca
- Class: Gastropoda
- Subclass: Caenogastropoda
- Order: Neogastropoda
- Family: Costellariidae
- Genus: Thala
- Species: T. malvacea

Binomial name
- Thala malvacea Jousseaume, 1898

= Thala malvacea =

Species of gastropod

Thala malvacea is a species of small sea snail, marine gastropod mollusk in the family Costellariidae, the ribbed miters.

== Description ==
The length of the shell attains 9.8 mm.

The shell is elongated and spindle-shaped (fusiform), somewhat swollen in profile, and slightly curved toward the anterior end. The surface is ribbed. The ribs are granulated. On the last (body) whorl there are approximately 24 ribs; on the penultimate whorl there are about 12. The shell is pale violet-purple in coloration. There are 8 whorls in total. The whorls are convex. The first (protoconch) is smooth and whitish; the subsequent whorls are roughened in texture. The final (body) whorl bears white, roughly square spots arranged in a band across the middle. The aperture is oblong and slightly sinuous. The columella is convex and bears four folds (plaits). The outer lip is thickened and finely crenulated (scalloped) on the inner surface, with the crenulations extending up to the suture.

== Distribution ==
This marine species occurs off Djibouti.
