= Caribbonus wandoensis =

Scientific classification
- Kingdom: Animalia
- Phylum: Mollusca
- Class: Gastropoda
- Subclass: Caenogastropoda
- Order: Neogastropoda
- Superfamily: Turbinelloidea
- Family: Costellariidae
- Genus: Caribbonus
- Species: C. wandoensis

Binomial name
- Caribbonus wandoensis (Holmes, 1859)

Synonyms
- Mitra rushii Dall, 1887 junior subjective synonym; Mitra wandoense (Holmes, 1860) superseded combination; Uromitra wandoense (Holmes, 1860) superseded combination; † Vexillum (Uromitra) wandoensis (Holmes, 1860) superseded combination (improper ending to species name); Vexillum wandoense (F. S. Holmes, 1860) superseded combination; Volutomitra wandoensis Holmes, 1860 superseded combination

Species of gastropod

Caribbonus wandoensise is a species of small sea snail, marine gastropod mollusk in the family Costellariidae, the ribbed miters.

== Description ==
The length of the shell attains 6 mm.

(Original description) The small shell is sub-fusiform and ventricose. The spire is much longer than the aperture. The whorls are flattened and impressed with numerous transverse dotted grooves which become obsolete below the sutures. The sutures are distinct. The aperture is ear-shaped and contracted posteriorly. The outer lip is thin, simple and arcuated. The columella has three oblique plaits.

== Distribution ==
This marine species occurs off Venezuela.

Fossils have been found in Post-Pleistocene strata of South Carolina, USA.
