= Vexillena elliscrossi =

Scientific classification
- Kingdom: Animalia
- Phylum: Mollusca
- Class: Gastropoda
- Subclass: Caenogastropoda
- Order: Neogastropoda
- Superfamily: Turbinelloidea
- Family: Costellariidae
- Genus: Vexillena
- Species: V. elliscrossi

Binomial name
- Vexillena elliscrossi (Rosenberg & Salisbury, 1991)

Synonyms
- Pusia (Vexillena) elliscrossi (Rosenberg & Salisbury, 1991); Pusia elliscrossi (Rosenberg & R. Salisbury, 1991) superseded combination; Vexillum (Costellaria) elliscrossi Rosenberg & Salisbury, 1991; Vexillum elliscrossi Rosenberg & Salisbury, 1991

Species of gastropod

Vexillena elliscrossi is a species of sea snail, a marine gastropod mollusk, in the family Costellariidae, the ribbed miters.

== Description ==
The length of the shell varies between 16.9 mm and 18.5 mm, the width of the body whorl ranges from 5.8 mm to 6.8 mm.

== Distribution ==
This marine species occurs off Hawaii.
