= Thala angiostoma =

Scientific classification
- Kingdom: Animalia
- Phylum: Mollusca
- Class: Gastropoda
- Subclass: Caenogastropoda
- Order: Neogastropoda
- Family: Costellariidae
- Genus: Thala
- Species: T. angiostoma

Binomial name
- Thala angiostoma Pease, 1868

Species of gastropod

Thala angiostoma is a species of small sea snail, marine gastropod mollusk in the family Costellariidae, the ribbed miters.
