= Vexillum fraudator =

Scientific classification
- Kingdom: Animalia
- Phylum: Mollusca
- Class: Gastropoda
- Subclass: Caenogastropoda
- Order: Neogastropoda
- Superfamily: Turbinelloidea
- Family: Costellariidae
- Genus: Vexillum
- Species: V. fraudator

Binomial name
- Vexillum fraudator Turner, Gori & Salisbury, 2007

Synonyms
- Vexillum (Costellaria) fraudator H. Turner, Gori & R. Salisbury, 2007

Species of gastropod

Vexillum fraudator is a species of small sea snail, marine gastropod mollusk in the family Costellariidae, the ribbed miters.

== Description ==
The length of the shell attains 9.6 mm and is often ribbed. Like other members of its genus, it is elongated. It inhabits warm marine environments and feeds on small invertebrates.

== Distribution ==
This marine species occurs off Mozambique and the Marshall Islands.
