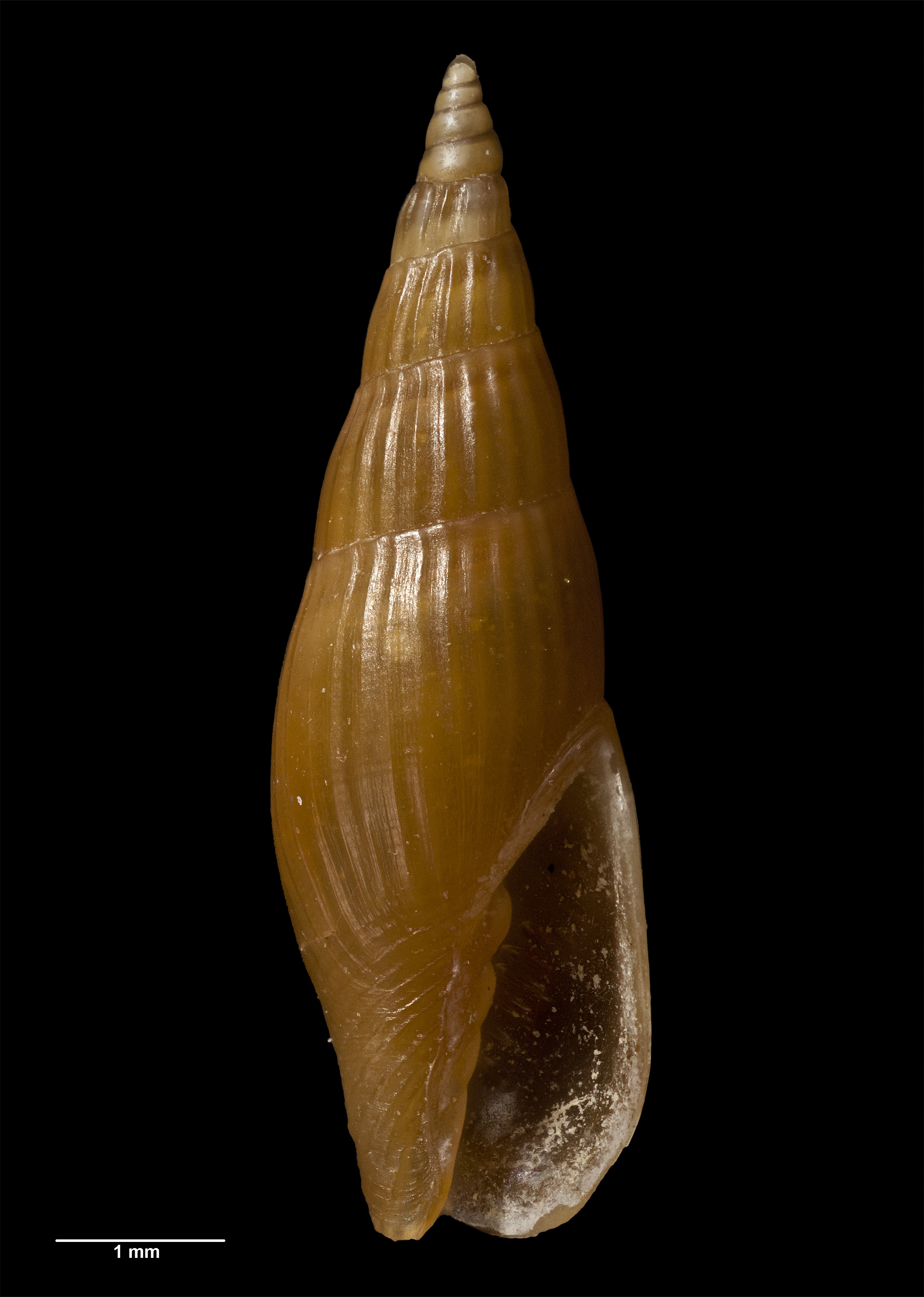
- Holotype

Scientific classification
- Kingdom: Animalia
- Phylum: Mollusca
- Class: Gastropoda
- Subclass: Caenogastropoda
- Order: Neogastropoda
- Family: Costellariidae
- Genus: Thaluta
- Species: T. maxmarrowi

Binomial name
- Thaluta maxmarrowi (Cernohorsky, 1980)

Synonyms
- Thala maxmarrowi Cernohorsky, 1980; Vexillum (Pusia) maxmarrowi (Cernohorsky, 1980)

= Thaluta maxmarrowi =

Species of gastropod

Thaluta maxmarrowi is a species of small sea snail, marine gastropod mollusk in the family Costellariidae, the ribbed miters.
