= Mitromica gratiosa =

Scientific classification
- Kingdom: Animalia
- Phylum: Mollusca
- Class: Gastropoda
- Subclass: Caenogastropoda
- Order: Neogastropoda
- Family: Costellariidae
- Genus: Mitromica
- Species: M. gratiosa

Binomial name
- Mitromica gratiosa (Reeve, 1845)

Synonyms
- Thala gratiosa (Reeve, 1845)

Species of gastropod

Mitromica gratiosa is a species of small sea snail, marine gastropod mollusk in the family Costellariidae, the ribbed miters.
