= Mitromica solitaria =

Scientific classification
- Kingdom: Animalia
- Phylum: Mollusca
- Class: Gastropoda
- Subclass: Caenogastropoda
- Order: Neogastropoda
- Family: Costellariidae
- Genus: Mitromica
- Species: M. solitaria

Binomial name
- Mitromica solitaria (C. B. Adams, 1852)

Synonyms
- Mitra solitaria C. B. Adams, 1852 (basionym); Thala solitaria (C. B. Adams, 1852)

Species of gastropod

Mitromica solitaria is a species of small sea snail, marine gastropod mollusk in the family Costellariidae, the ribbed miters.
