= Mitromica decaryi =

Scientific classification
- Kingdom: Animalia
- Phylum: Mollusca
- Class: Gastropoda
- Subclass: Caenogastropoda
- Order: Neogastropoda
- Family: Costellariidae
- Genus: Mitromica
- Species: M. decaryi

Binomial name
- Mitromica decaryi (Dautzenberg, 1932)

Synonyms
- Mitra (Thala) decaryi P. Dautzenberg, 1932 (original description); Thala decaryi (P. Dautzenberg, 1932)

Species of gastropod

Mitromica decaryi is a species of small sea snail, marine gastropod mollusk in the family Costellariidae, the ribbed miters.
