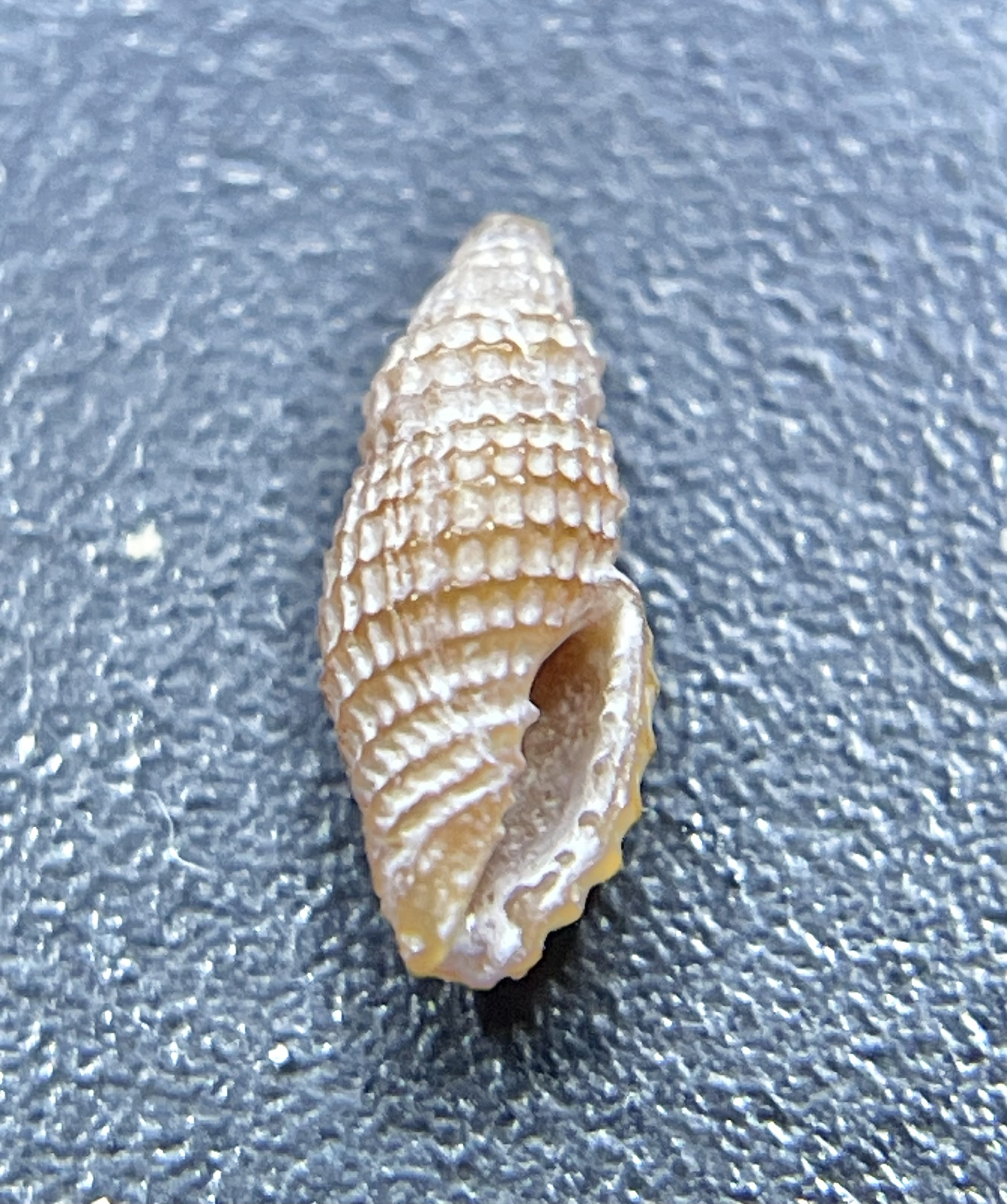

Scientific classification
- Kingdom: Animalia
- Phylum: Mollusca
- Class: Gastropoda
- Subclass: Caenogastropoda
- Order: Neogastropoda
- Superfamily: Turbinelloidea
- Family: Costellariidae
- Genus: Mitromica
- Species: M. foveata

Binomial name
- Mitromica foveata (Sowerby II, 1874)

Synonyms
- Mitra floridana Dall, 1884; Mitra foveata G.B. Sowerby II, 1874 (basionym); Thala floridana (Dall, 1884) ·; Thala foveata (G.B. Sowerby II, 1874)

= Mitromica foveata =

Species of sea snail

Mitromica foveata is a species of small sea snail, marine gastropod mollusk in the family Costellariidae, the ribbed miters.

== Description ==
The shell is small, sub-cylindrical and cancellated. The obtuse spire is equal to aperture in length. The aperture shows a sinus near the suture and is contracted in the middle and a little acuminated anteriorly.

== Distribution ==
This species occurs in the Caribbean Sea and the Gulf of Mexico.
