= Mitromica jeancateae =

Scientific classification
- Kingdom: Animalia
- Phylum: Mollusca
- Class: Gastropoda
- Subclass: Caenogastropoda
- Order: Neogastropoda
- Family: Costellariidae
- Genus: Mitromica
- Species: M. jeancateae

Binomial name
- Mitromica jeancateae (Sphon, 1969)

Synonyms
- Thala jeancateae Sphon, 1969

Species of gastropod

Mitromica jeancateae is a species of small sea snail, marine gastropod mollusc in the family Costellariidae, the ribbed miters.
