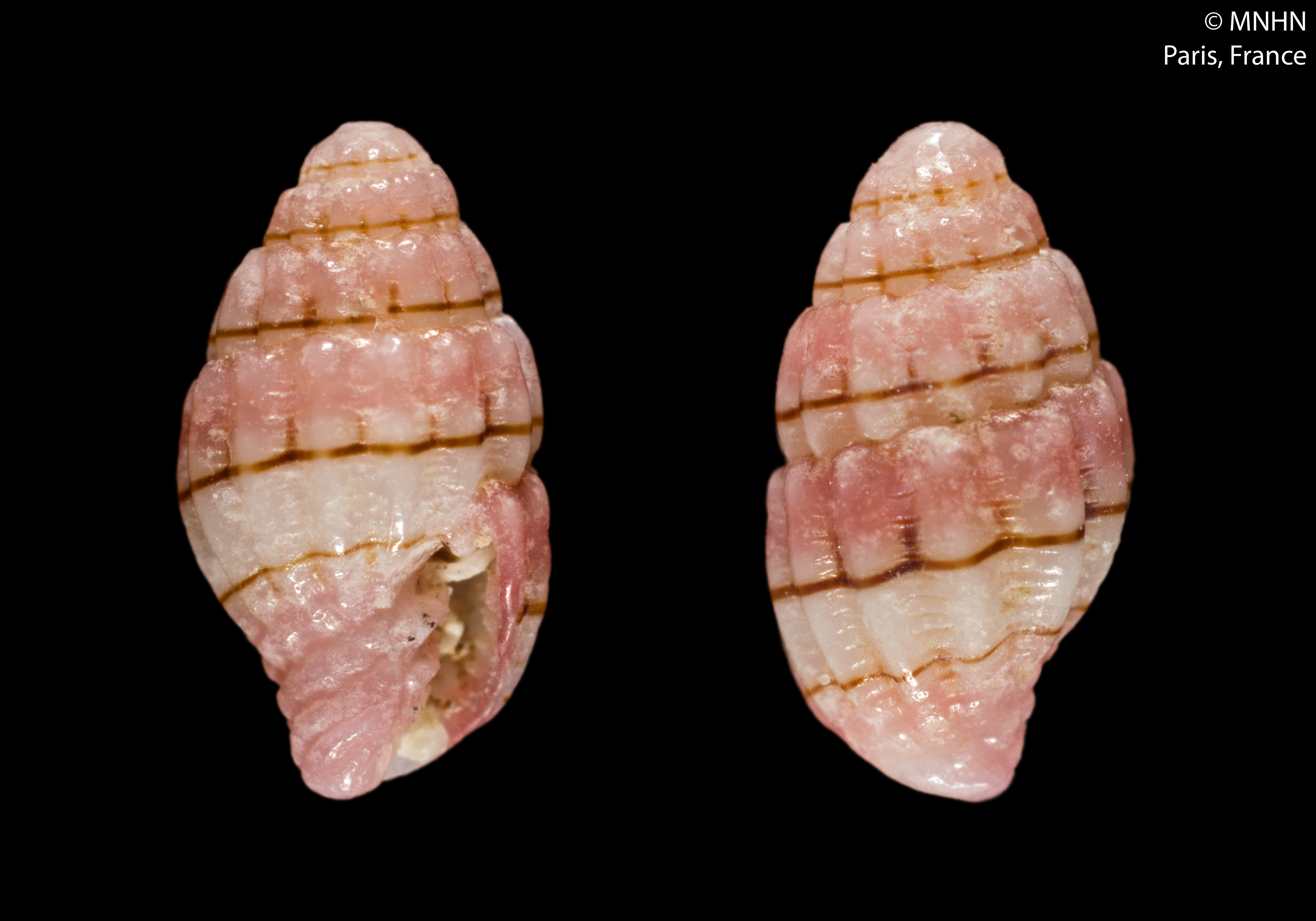
- Shell of Vexillum exquisitum (paralectotype at MNHN, Paris)

Scientific classification
- Kingdom: Animalia
- Phylum: Mollusca
- Class: Gastropoda
- Subclass: Caenogastropoda
- Order: Neogastropoda
- Family: Costellariidae
- Genus: Vexillum
- Species: V. exquisitum

Binomial name
- Vexillum exquisitum (Garrett, 1873)

Synonyms
- Mitra cernica Sowerby II & Sowerby III, 1874; Mitra exquisita Garrett, 1873(original combination); Mitra suavis Souverbie, 1875 (original combination); Thala exquisita (Garrett, 1873); Vexillum (Pusia) exquisitum (Garrett, 1873); Vexillum (Pusia) suave (Souverbie, 1875); Vexillum suave (Souverbie, 1875) ·

= Vexillum exquisitum =

Species of gastropod

Vexillum exquisitum is a species of small sea snail, marine gastropod mollusk in the family Costellariidae, the ribbed miters.

== Description ==
The length of the shell varies between 5 mm and 8 mm.

(Original description) The small shell is oblong, subfusiform, glassy, hyaline. It is pinkish red, with two transverse brown lines enclosing a white band, the band and one line continued up the spire. The spire is rather short, turreted, subacute, little more than half the length of the shell. The shell contains 9 whorls (3 of which are embryonal), plano-convex, shouldered above, the body whorl rounded, much contracted and granulated at the base, which is produced in a short slightly twisted siphonal canal. The shell is longitudinally ribbed, ribs closely set, rather large, angular, slightly nodulose above, 12 to 13 in number. The interstices are transversely impressedly striated. The aperture is narrow. The outer lip is rather thin, notched above, and slightly sinuous. The columella has four folds.

The small, stout shell has a fusiform shape. The whorls show prominent, rounded shoulders and a series of strong axial ribs. The columella has four plaits. The shells of living examples have two dark-brown spiral lines on the body whorl that enclose a milk-white band.

== Distribution ==
This marine species occurs off the Tuamotu Islands, Tahiti, Cook Islands, Samoa and Fiji.

A fossil has been found in Holocene strata on Eniwetok Atol, Marshall Islands.
