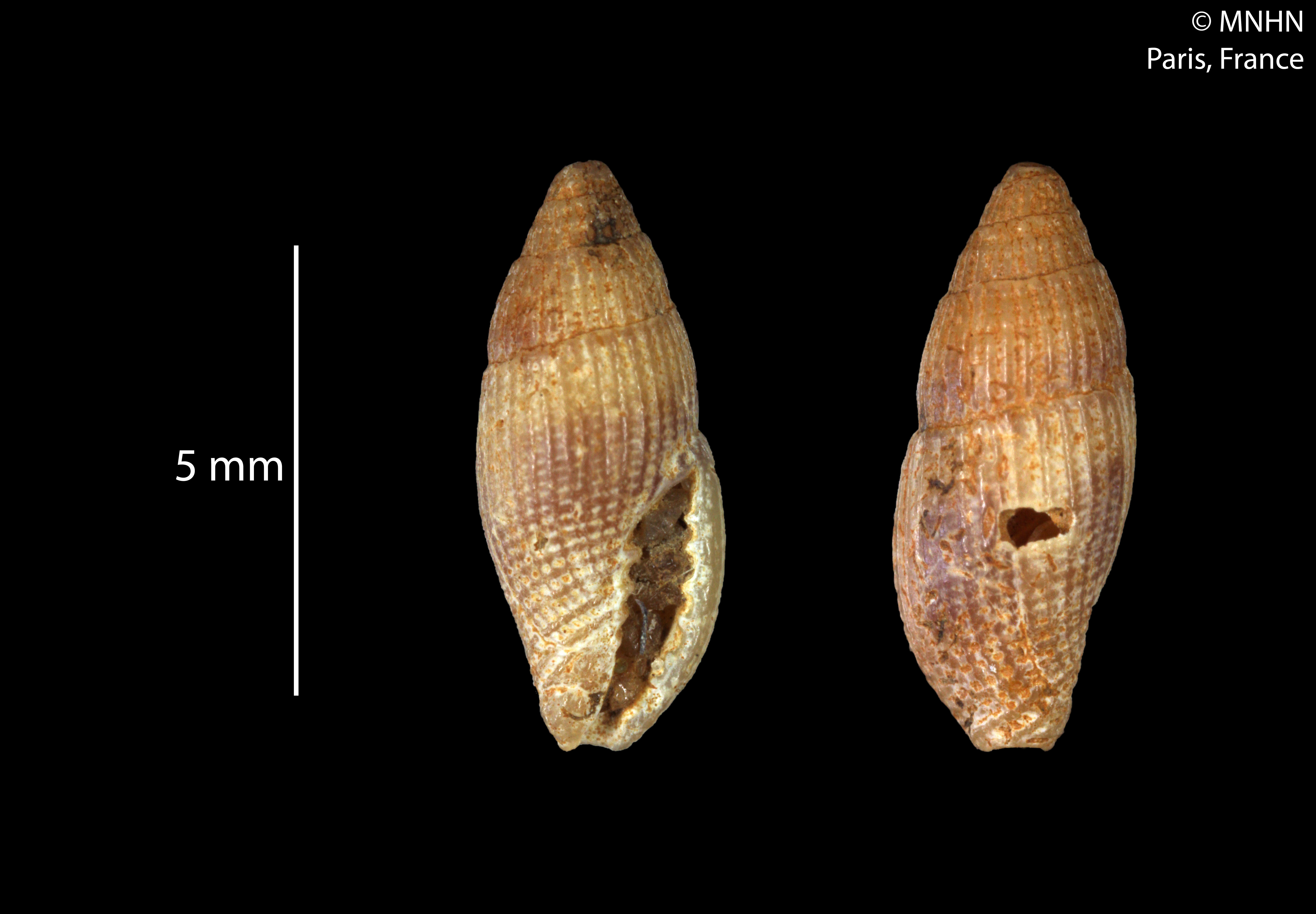
- Shell of Mitromica africana (paratype at MNHN, Paris)

Scientific classification
- Kingdom: Animalia
- Phylum: Mollusca
- Class: Gastropoda
- Subclass: Caenogastropoda
- Order: Neogastropoda
- Family: Costellariidae
- Genus: Mitromica
- Species: M. africana

Binomial name
- Mitromica africana (Rolàn & Fernandes, 1996)

Synonyms
- Thala africana Rolàn & Fernandes, 1996

= Mitromica africana =

Species of gastropod

Mitromica africana is a species of small sea snail, marine gastropod mollusk in the family Costellariidae, the ribbed miters.

== Distribution ==
This marine species occurs off Angola.
