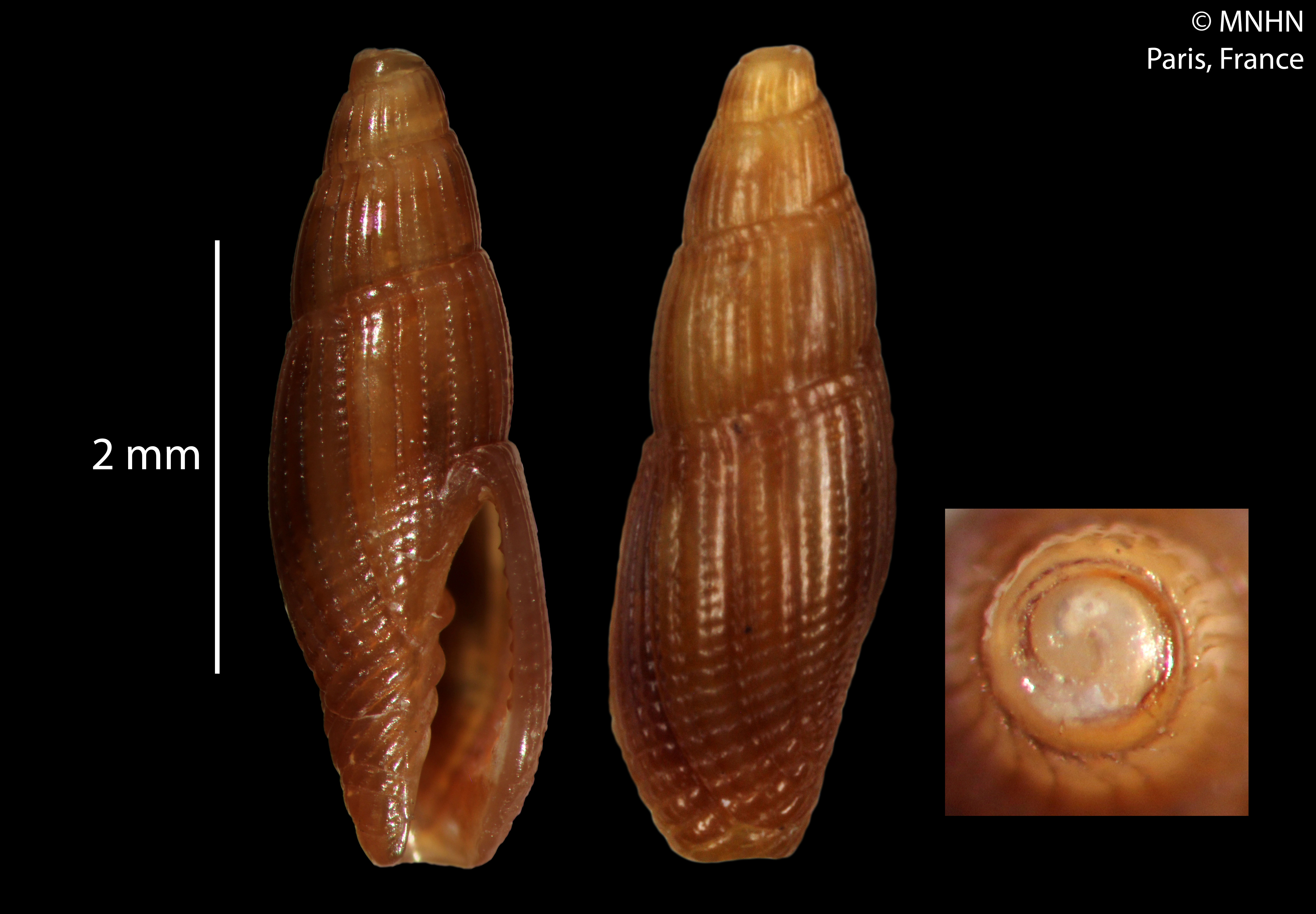
- Shell of Mitromica esperanza (paratype at MNHN, Paris)

Scientific classification
- Kingdom: Animalia
- Phylum: Mollusca
- Class: Gastropoda
- Subclass: Caenogastropoda
- Order: Neogastropoda
- Family: Costellariidae
- Genus: Mitromica
- Species: M. esperanza

Binomial name
- Mitromica esperanza Leal & Moore, 1993

Synonyms
- Thala esperanza Leal & Moore, 1993

= Mitromica esperanza =

Species of gastropod

Mitromica esperanza is a species of small sea snail, marine gastropod mollusk in the family Costellariidae, the ribbed miters.

== Distribution ==
This marine species occurs off Puerto Rico.
