= Gary Rosenberg =

- Born: October 16, 1959 (age 66)
- Citizenship: USA
- Education: Princeton University
- Scientific career
- Fields: Malacology, Systematics, Evolutionary Biology, Biodiversity Informatics
- Workplaces: Academy of Natural Sciences of Philadelphia, Drexel University
- Doctoral advisor: Kenneth Jay Boss, Harvard University
- Other academic advisors: Ruth Dixon Turner, Stephen Jay Gould

Gary Rosenberg (born New Rochelle, New York, 16 October 1959) is an American malacologist.

== Biography ==
He graduated from Princeton University in 1981 with a bachelor's degree in geology and obtained a Ph.D. in 1989 at Harvard University in the Department of Organismic and Evolutionary Biology. He is currently the Pilsbry Chair and Curator of Malacology at the Academy of Natural Sciences of Philadelphia (ANSP) and a professor at Drexel University in the Department of Biodiversity, Earth and Environmental Science. He is a member of the International Commission on Zoological Nomenclature.

Rosenberg created "Malacolog", an online database of western Atlantic marine mollusks. He also contributed significantly to the "Biotic Database of Indo-Pacific Marine Mollusks" and created an interactive key to the land snails of the West Indian island of Jamaica. More recently he has contributed much work to the worldwide database of marine organisms, WoRMS.

A brief description of the malacology collection at the ANSP is available at the ANSP Collections Website. This links to a more comprehensive description of the collection, with statistics and a search facility, that is hosted by the Global Biodiversity Information Facility (GBIF) under the title Malacology Collection at the Academy of Natural Sciences of Philadelphia.

== Taxa ==
Rosenberg has, alone or together with others, described and named various taxa of mollusks, including:

- Lienardia totopotens Rosenberg & Stahlschmidt, 2011
- Lunovula Rosenberg, 1990
- Lunovula finleyi Rosenberg, 1990
- Mitromica calliaqua Rosenberg & Salisbury, 2003
- Mitromica cosmani Rosenberg & Salisbury, 2003
- Mitromica dicksoni Rosenberg & Salisbury, 2003
- Mitromica oryza Rosenberg & Salisbury, 2003
- Mitromica williamsae Rosenberg & Salisbury, 2003
- Prionovolva melonis Rosenberg, 2010
- Thala abelai Rosenberg & Salisbury, 2014
- Thala adamsi Rosenberg & Salisbury, 2003
- Thala evelynae Rosenberg & Salisbury, 2014
- Thala gloriae Rosenberg & Salisbury, 2003
- Thala gorii Rosenberg & Salisbury, 2003
- Thala hilli Rosenberg & Salisbury, 2007
- Thala kilburni Rosenberg & Salisbury, 2014
- Thala lillicoi Rosenberg & Salisbury, 2007
- Thala merrilli Rosenberg & Salisbury, 2014
- Thala pallida Rosenberg & Salisbury, 2014
- Thala ruggeriae Rosenberg & Salisbury, 2014
- Thala suduirauti Rosenberg & Salisbury, 2014
- Thaluta Rosenberg & Callomon, 2004
- Thaluta takenoko Rosenberg & Callomon, 2004
- Trivellona bealsi Rosenberg & Finley, 2001
- Trivia marlowi Rosenberg & Finley, 2001: synonym of Trivellona marlowi (Rosenberg & Finley, 2001)
- Triviella immelmani Rosenberg & Finley, 2001
- Tudivasum Rosenberg & Petit, 1987
- Vertigo marciae Nekola & Rosenberg, 2013
- Vexillum (Costellaria) brunneolinea Rosenberg & Salisbury, 1991
- Vexillum (Costellaria) elliscrossi Rosenberg & Salisbury, 1991: synonym of Vexillum elliscrossi Rosenberg & Salisbury, 1991
- Vexillum elliscrossi Rosenberg & Salisbury, 1991

== Publications ==
Rosenberg has published, alone or in collaboration with others, a great number of publications, including:

- 1987: G. Rosenberg & R. E. Petit, Ryckholt’s Mélanges Paléontologiques, 1851-1862, with a new name for Tudicula H. & A. Adams, non Ryckholt. Proceedings of the Academy of Natural Sciences of Philadelphia 139: 53-64
- 1992: G. Rosenberg, An introduction to the Ovulidae (Gastropoda: Cypraeacea). American Conchologist 20:4-7,
- 1998: G. Rosenberg, In memoriam Harold Lewis (1927-1998) . American Malacological Union Newsletter 29(1): 6
- 1998: G. Rosenberg, Harold Lewis 1927-1998. La Conchiglia 30(288): 59
- 1999: G. Rosenberg, Harold Lewis, 1927-1998. Of Sea and Shore 21(4): 228
- 2003: G. Rosenberg & R. E. Petit, Kaicher’s Card Catalogue of World-Wide Shells: a collation, with discussion of species named therein. The Nautilus 117(4): 99-120
- 2004: G. Rosenberg, G. and D. Drumm. Interactive Key to Jamaican Land Snails (Rosenberg also specializes in the land snails of Jamaica).
- 2006: G. Rosenberg, and I. V. Muratov. Status Report on the Terrestrial Mollusca of Jamaica. Proceedings of the Academy of Natural Sciences of Philadelphia 155: 117-161
- 2006: McClain, C. R., A. G. Boyer and G. Rosenberg. The Island Rule and the evolution of body size in the deep sea. Journal of Biogeography 33: 1578-1584
- 2007: G. Rosenberg and R. Salisbury. New species of Thala (Gastropoda: Costellariidae) from Hawaii, with comments on other Indo-Pacific species. Vita Malacologica 5: 53-62
- 2008: G. Rosenberg. The land snails. pp. 43–46 in Jamaica: A photographic journey through the land of wood and water. Eladio Fernández: Jamaica
- 2009: G. Rosenberg, E. F. García and F. Moretzsohn. Gastropods (Mollusca) of the Gulf of Mexico. pp. 579–699 in D. L. Felder and D. K. Camp, eds., The Gulf of Mexico: Origins, Waters and Marine Life. Texas A&M University Press (a much cited work)
- 2010: M. A. Snyder, W. G. Lyons & G. Rosenberg, The date of publication of section 16, corrigenda quaedum et addenda, of Dunker’s Novitates Conchologicae, Series II, Marina mollusca. The Nautilus 124(4): 192-193.
- 2010: G. Rosenberg: Description of a new species of Prionovolva (Mollusca, Gastropoda, Ovulidae) from East Africa, with reassessment of the composition of the genus. Proceedings of the Academy of Natural Sciences of Philadelphia 159: 39-66
