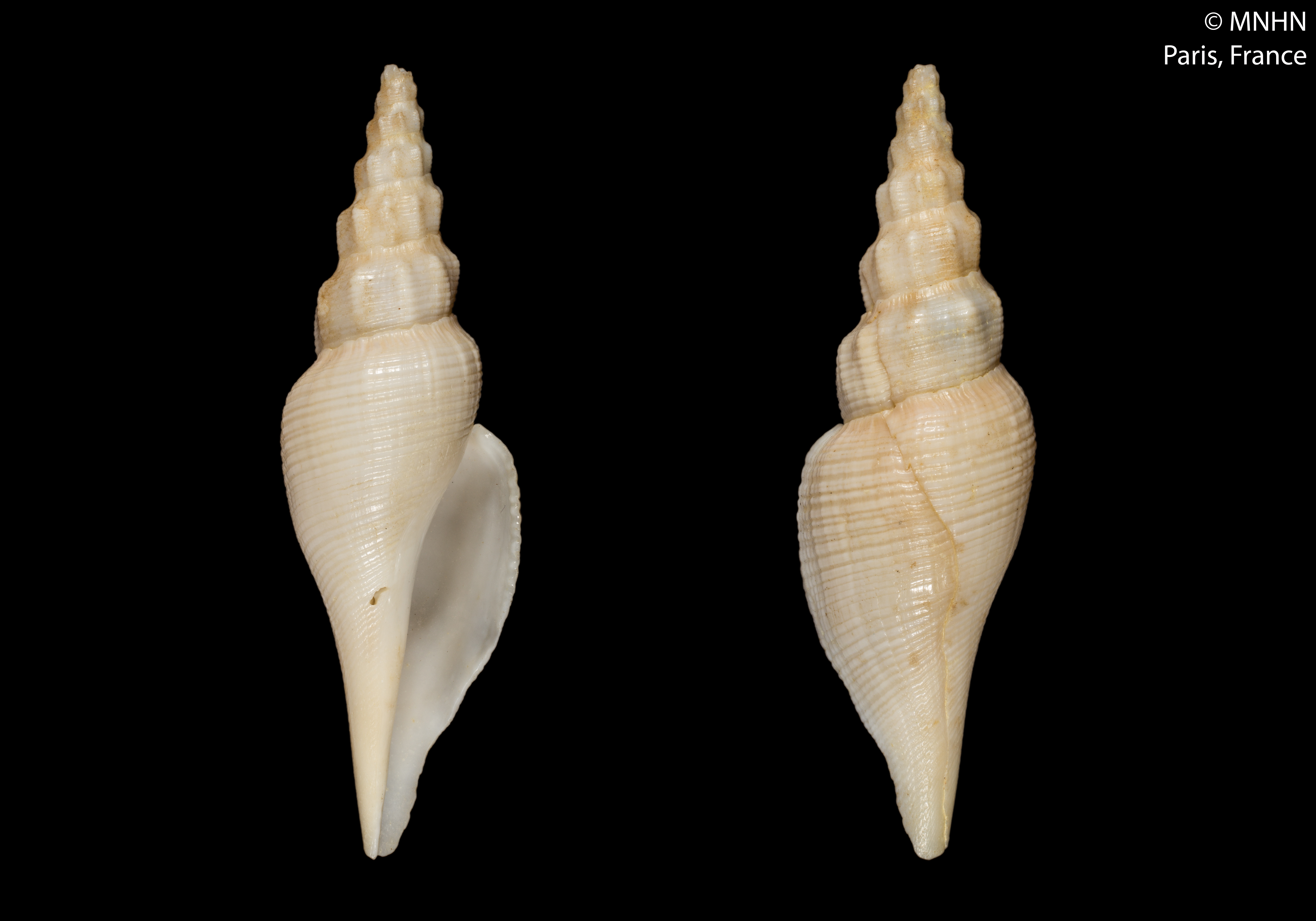
- Shell of Exilia hilgendorfi (holotype at MNHN, Paris)

Scientific classification
- Kingdom: Animalia
- Phylum: Mollusca
- Class: Gastropoda
- Subclass: Caenogastropoda
- Order: Neogastropoda
- Family: Ptychatractidae
- Genus: Exilia
- Species: E. hilgendorfi

Binomial name
- Exilia hilgendorfi (Martens, 1897)

Synonyms
- Benthovoluta hilgendorfi (Martens, 1897); † Mitra plicifera Yokoyama, 1920; Phenacoptygma kiiense Kuroda, 1931; Voluta hilgendorfi Martens, 1897 (original combination)

= Exilia hilgendorfi =

Species of gastropod

Exilia hilgendorfi is a species of sea snail, a marine gastropod mollusc in the family Ptychatractidae.

== Description ==
The length of the shell attains 90.5 mm.

== Distribution ==
This marine species occurs off Madagascar; also off the east coast of Japan, from the Boso peninsula and Hachijo Island southwards (50–480 m depth) to the South China Sea (339–633 m depth) and the Solomon Islands (504–862 m depth).
