= Exilia blanda =

Scientific classification
- Kingdom: Animalia
- Phylum: Mollusca
- Class: Gastropoda
- Subclass: Caenogastropoda
- Order: Neogastropoda
- Family: Ptychatractidae
- Genus: Exilia
- Species: E. blanda

Binomial name
- Exilia blanda (Dall, 1908)

Synonyms
- Daphnella (Surculina) blanda Dall, 1908

Species of gastropod

Exilia blanda is a species of sea snail, a marine gastropod mollusk in the family Ptychatractidae.
