= Exilia krigei =

Scientific classification
- Kingdom: Animalia
- Phylum: Mollusca
- Class: Gastropoda
- Subclass: Caenogastropoda
- Order: Neogastropoda
- Family: Ptychatractidae
- Genus: Exilia
- Species: E. krigei

Binomial name
- Exilia krigei (Kilburn, 1971)

Synonyms
- Benthovoluta krigei Kilburn, 1971

Species of gastropod

Exilia krigei is a species of sea snail, a marine gastropod mollusk in the family Ptychatractidae.
