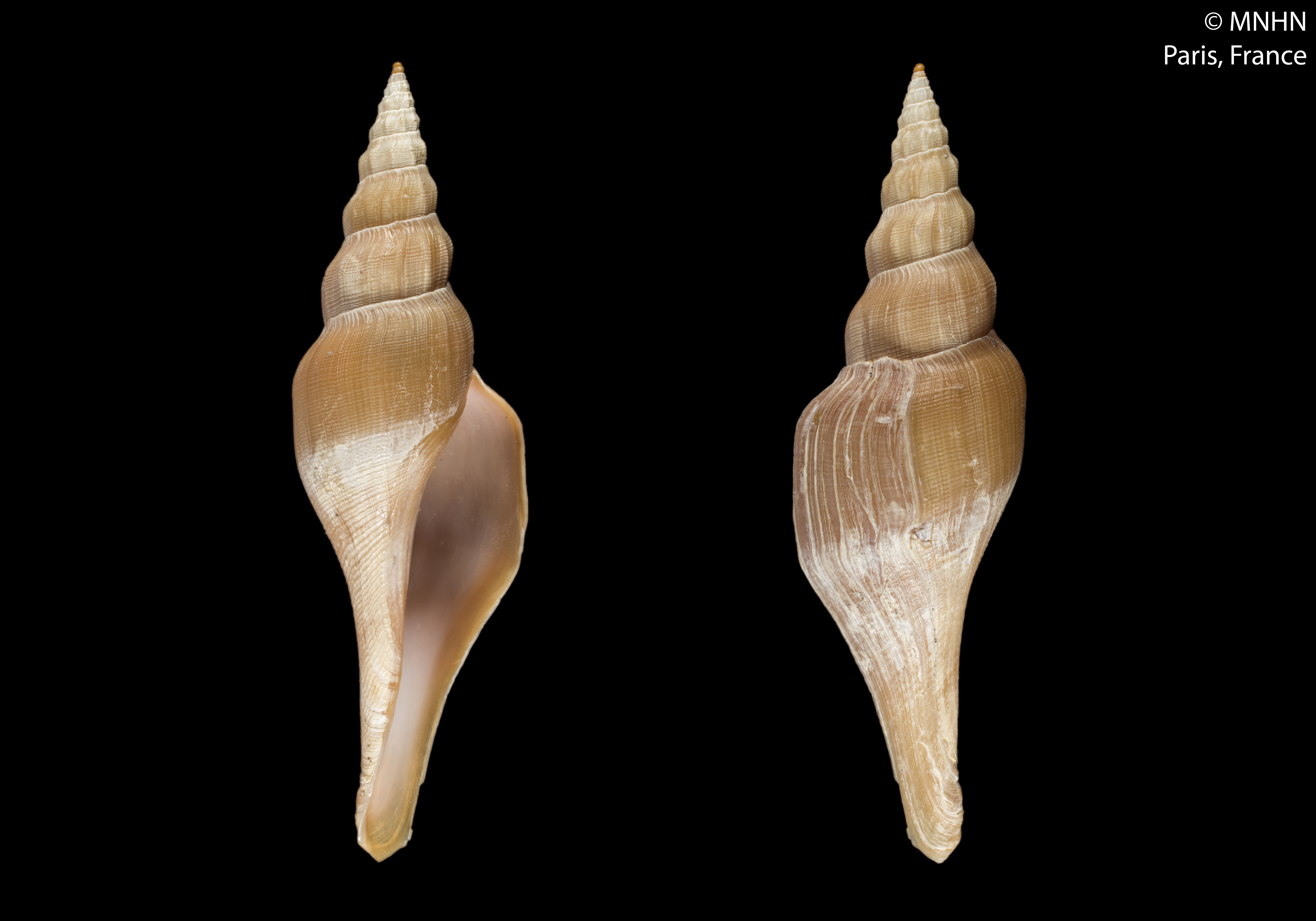
- Shell of Exilia vagrans (holotype at MNHN, Paris)

Scientific classification
- Kingdom: Animalia
- Phylum: Mollusca
- Class: Gastropoda
- Subclass: Caenogastropoda
- Order: Neogastropoda
- Family: Ptychatractidae
- Genus: Exilia
- Species: E. vagrans

Binomial name
- Exilia vagrans Kantor, Bouchet, 2001

= Exilia vagrans =

Species of gastropod

Exilia vagrans is a species of sea snail, a marine gastropod mollusk in the family Ptychatractidae.

== Description ==
The length of the shell attains 53.5 mm.

== Distribution ==
This marine species occurs in the South Pacific Ocean off Vanuatu.
