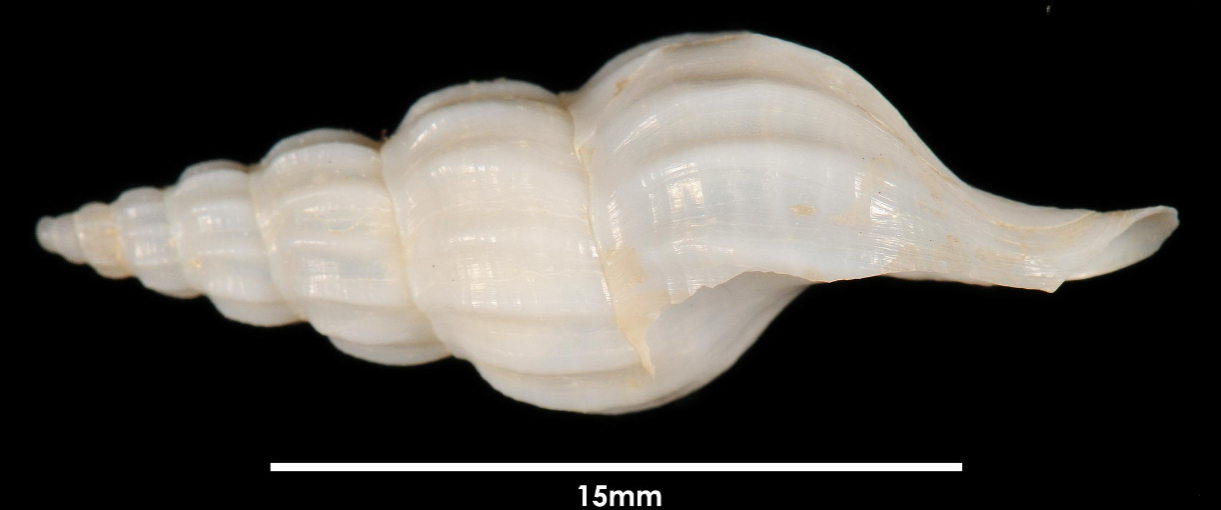
- Shell of Metzgeria problematica

Scientific classification
- Kingdom: Animalia
- Phylum: Mollusca
- Class: Gastropoda
- Subclass: Caenogastropoda
- Order: Neogastropoda
- Family: Ptychatractidae
- Genus: Metzgeria; Norman, 1879

Synonyms
- Meyeria Dunker & Metzger, 1874

= Metzgeria (gastropod) =

Genus of gastropods

Metzgeria is a genus of sea snails, marine gastropod molluscs in the family Ptychatractidae.

== Species ==
Species within the genus Metzgeria include:

- Metzgeria alba (Jeffreys in Wyville-Thomson, 1873)
- Metzgeria californica Dall, 1903
- Metzgeria gagei Bouchet & Warén, 1985
- Metzgeria holcophorus (Barnard, 1959)
- Metzgeria montereyana Smith & Gordon, 1948
- Metzgeria problematica (Ponder, 1968)
- Metzgeria shirleyi (Cernohorsky, 1980)

Synonyms

- Metzgeria albella (Dunker & Metzger, 1874): synonym of Metzgeria alba (Jeffreys, 1873)
- Metzgeria apodema Bouchet & Talavera, 1981: synonym of Euthriostoma saharicum (Locard, 1897)
- Metzgeria costata (Dall, 1890): synonym of Latiromitra costata (Dall, 1890)
