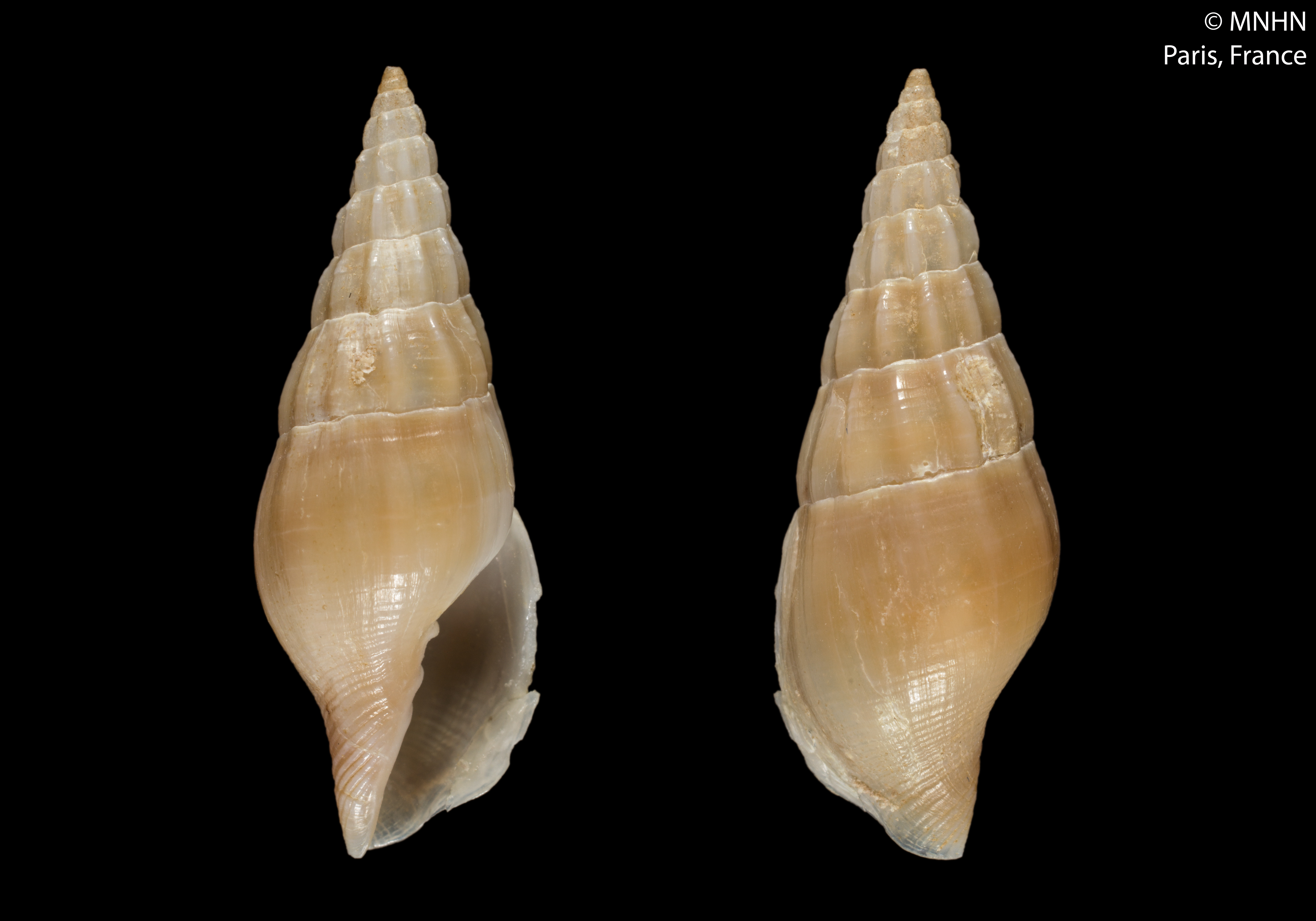
- Shell of Latiromitra paiciorum (holotype at MNHN, Paris)

Scientific classification
- Kingdom: Animalia
- Phylum: Mollusca
- Class: Gastropoda
- Subclass: Caenogastropoda
- Order: Neogastropoda
- Family: Costellariidae
- Genus: Latiromitra
- Species: L. paiciorum

Binomial name
- Latiromitra paiciorum Bouchet & Kantor, 2000

= Latiromitra paiciorum =

Species of gastropod

Latiromitra paiciorum is a species of sea snail, a marine gastropod mollusk in the family Costellariidae. It is named after the Kanak linguistic group, occupying the east coast of New Caledonia near Cape Bayes, and the speakers of the Paici language.

== Description ==
The length of the shell attains 25.1 mm. Color is light brown-beige, polished, and periostracum transparent. L. paiciorum resembles L. crytodon, but differs in having fewer axial ribs and stronger columellar plaits. It differs from other Indo-Pacific species by its small adult size.

== Distribution ==
This marine species occurs off New Caledonia and Norfolk Ridge.
