= M. californica =

M. californica may refer to:

- Malacothrix californica, the California desertdandelion, a flowering plant species native to California and Baja California
- Meleagris californica, the Californian turkey, an extinct species of fowl that lived from the Pleistocene to the early Holocene
- Melica californica, the California melic, a grass species native to Oregon and California
- Metzgeria californica, a sea snail species
- Minuartia californica, the California sandwort, a flowering plant species native to Oregon and California
- Muhlenbergia californica, the California muhly, an uncommon grass species endemic to southern California
- Myliobatis californica, the bat ray, a fish species found in the eastern Pacific Ocean, between the Oregon coast and the Gulf of California
- Myrica californica, the California bayberry, California wax myrtle or Pacific wax, an evergreen shrub or small tree species native to the Pacific Ocean coast from Vancouver Island south to California

== See also ==
- List of Latin and Greek words commonly used in systematic names § C
