= Exilia kiwi =

Scientific classification
- Kingdom: Animalia
- Phylum: Mollusca
- Class: Gastropoda
- Subclass: Caenogastropoda
- Order: Neogastropoda
- Family: Ptychatractidae
- Genus: Exilia
- Species: E. kiwi

Binomial name
- Exilia kiwi Kantor, Bouchet, 2001

Species of gastropod

Exilia kiwi is a species of sea snail, a marine gastropod mollusk in the family Ptychatractidae.
