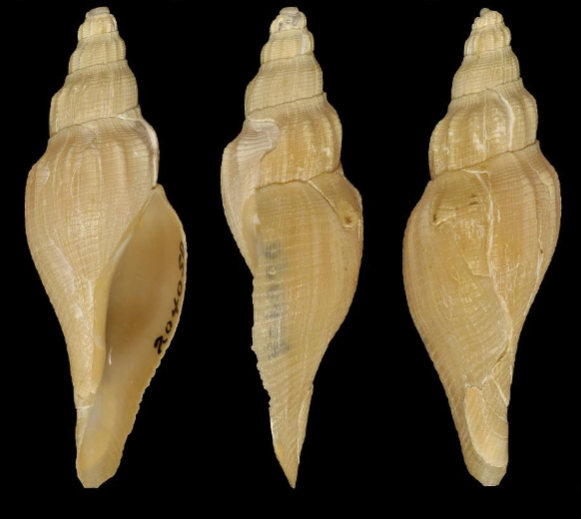
- Shell of Exilia cortezi (lectotype at the Smithsonian Institution)

Scientific classification
- Kingdom: Animalia
- Phylum: Mollusca
- Class: Gastropoda
- Subclass: Caenogastropoda
- Order: Neogastropoda
- Family: Ptychatractidae
- Genus: Exilia
- Species: E. cortezi

Binomial name
- Exilia cortezi (Dall, 1908)

Synonyms
- Daphnella (Surculina) cortezi Dall, 1908; Leucosyrinx galapagana Dall, 1919

= Exilia cortezi =

Species of gastropod

Exilia cortezi is a species of sea snail, a marine gastropod mollusk in the family Ptychatractidae.

== Distribution ==
This marine species was found off San Diego, Point Loma, California, United States, North Pacific Ocean.
