= Ptychatractus youngi =

Scientific classification
- Kingdom: Animalia
- Phylum: Mollusca
- Class: Gastropoda
- Subclass: Caenogastropoda
- Order: Neogastropoda
- Family: Ptychatractidae
- Genus: Ptychatractus
- Species: P. youngi

Binomial name
- Ptychatractus youngi Kilburn, 1975

Species of gastropod

Ptychatractus youngi is a species of sea snail, a marine gastropod mollusk in the family Ptychatractidae.
