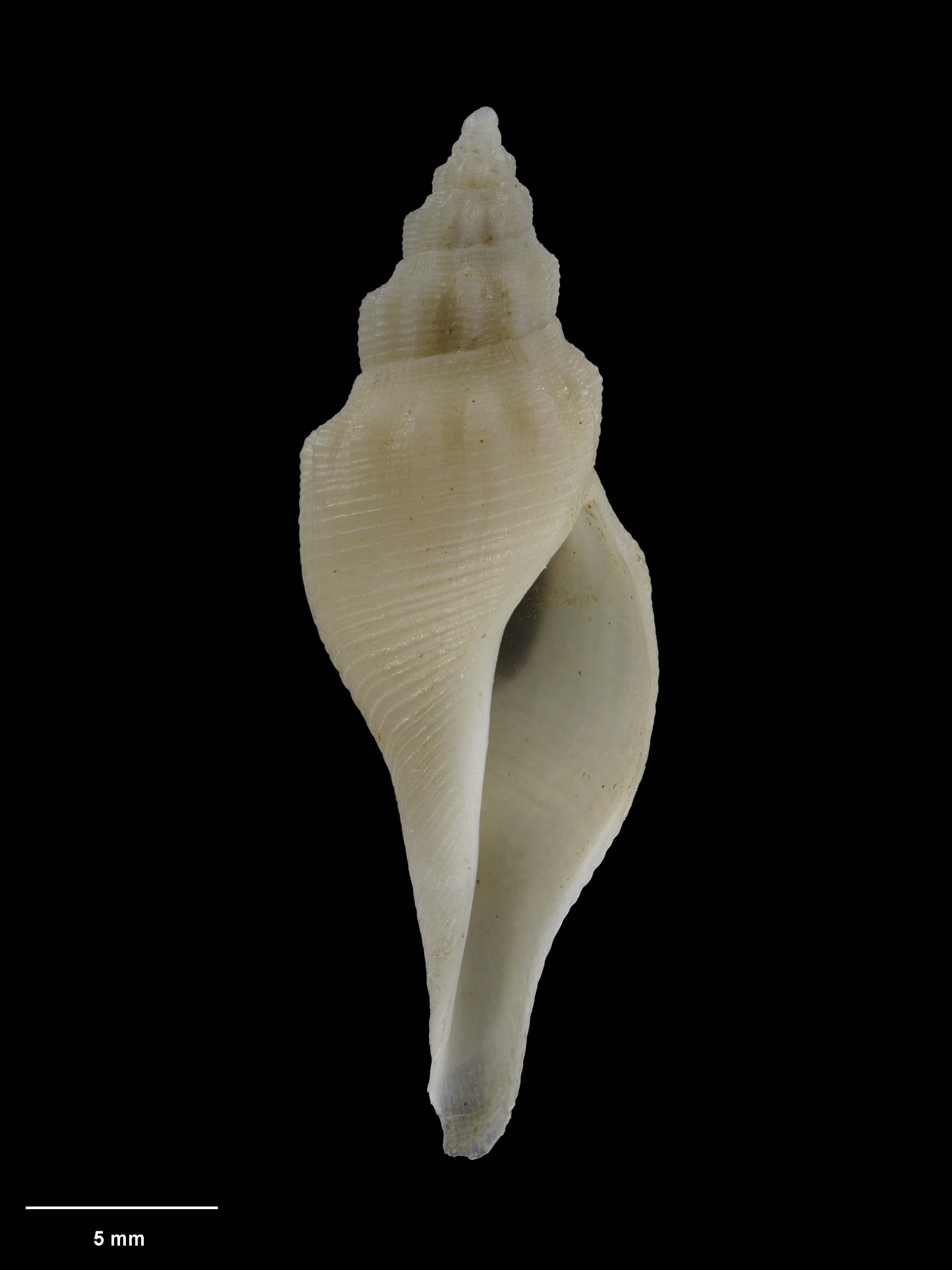

Scientific classification
- Kingdom: Animalia
- Phylum: Mollusca
- Class: Gastropoda
- Subclass: Caenogastropoda
- Order: Neogastropoda
- Family: Ptychatractidae
- Genus: Exilia
- Species: E. expeditionis

Binomial name
- Exilia expeditionis (Dell, 1956)

Synonyms
- Chathamidia expeditionis Dell, 1956

= Exilia expeditionis =

Species of gastropod

Exilia expeditionis is a species of sea snail, a marine gastropod mollusc in the family Ptychatractidae.

The name Chathamidia expeditionis was given to the snail after the 1954 expedition to the Chatham Islands.
