= Exilioidea indica =

Scientific classification
- Kingdom: Animalia
- Phylum: Mollusca
- Class: Gastropoda
- Subclass: Caenogastropoda
- Order: Neogastropoda
- Family: Ptychatractidae
- Genus: Exilioidea
- Species: E. indica

Binomial name
- Exilioidea indica Bouchet et Warén, 1988

Species of gastropod

Exilioidea indica is a species of sea snail, a marine gastropod mollusc in the family Ptychatractidae.
