= Latiromitra meekiana =

Scientific classification
- Kingdom: Animalia
- Phylum: Mollusca
- Class: Gastropoda
- Subclass: Caenogastropoda
- Order: Neogastropoda
- Family: Costellariidae
- Genus: Latiromitra
- Species: L. meekiana

Binomial name
- Latiromitra meekiana (Dall, 1889)

Synonyms
- Fasciolaria (Mesorhytis) Meekiana Dall, 1889

Species of gastropod

Latiromitra meekiana is a species of sea snail, a marine gastropod mollusc in the family Ptychatractidae.
