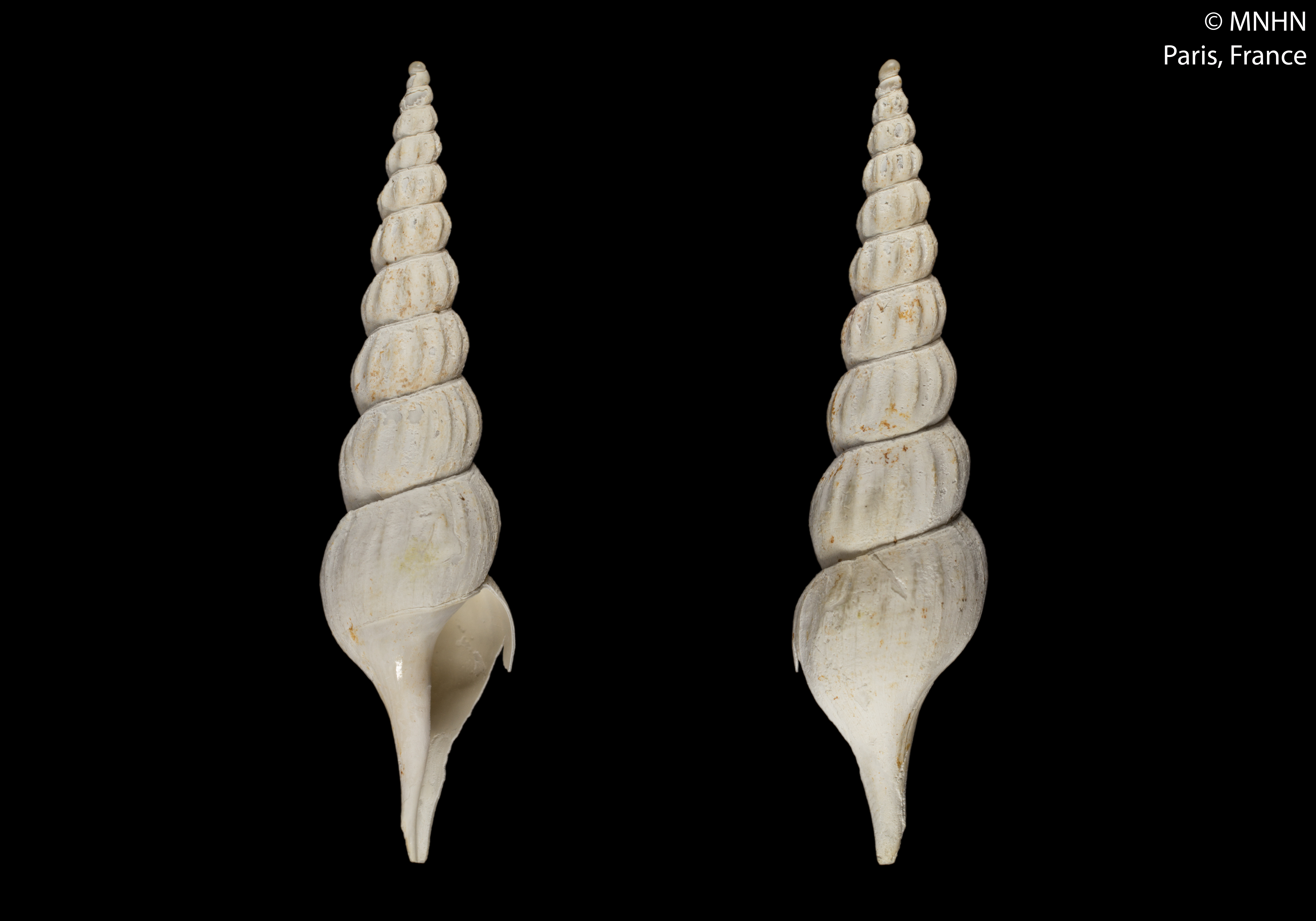
- Shell of Exilioidea atlantica (holotype at MNHN, Paris)

Scientific classification
- Kingdom: Animalia
- Phylum: Mollusca
- Class: Gastropoda
- Subclass: Caenogastropoda
- Order: Neogastropoda
- Family: Ptychatractidae
- Genus: Exilioidea
- Species: E. atlantica

Binomial name
- Exilioidea atlantica Bouchet & Warén, 1988

= Exilioidea atlantica =

Species of gastropod

Exilioidea atlantica is a species of sea snail, a marine gastropod mollusc in the family Ptychatractidae.

== Description ==
The length of the thin shell that spirals to a point attains 35.8 mm.

== Distribution ==
This marine species occurs in the Gulf of Mexico.
