= Latiromitra delicatula =

Scientific classification
- Kingdom: Animalia
- Phylum: Mollusca
- Class: Gastropoda
- Subclass: Caenogastropoda
- Order: Neogastropoda
- Family: Costellariidae
- Genus: Latiromitra
- Species: L. delicatula

Binomial name
- Latiromitra delicatula (Shikama, 1971)

Synonyms
- Benthovoluta delicatula Shikama, 1971

Species of gastropod

Latiromitra delicatula is a species of sea snail, a marine gastropod mollusk in the family Ptychatractidae.
