= Latiromitra barthelowi =

Scientific classification
- Kingdom: Animalia
- Phylum: Mollusca
- Class: Gastropoda
- Subclass: Caenogastropoda
- Order: Neogastropoda
- Family: Costellariidae
- Genus: Latiromitra
- Species: L. barthelowi

Binomial name
- Latiromitra barthelowi (Bartsch, 1942)

Synonyms
- Prodallia barthelowi Bartsch, 1942

Species of gastropod

Latiromitra barthelowi is a species of sea snail, a marine gastropod mollusk in the family Ptychatractidae.
