= Metzgeria montereyana =

Scientific classification
- Kingdom: Animalia
- Phylum: Mollusca
- Class: Gastropoda
- Subclass: Caenogastropoda
- Order: Neogastropoda
- Family: Ptychatractidae
- Genus: Metzgeria
- Species: M. montereyana

Binomial name
- Metzgeria montereyana Smith & Gordon, 1948

Species of gastropod

Metzgeria montereyana is a species of sea snail, a marine gastropod mollusc in the family Ptychatractidae.
