= Metzgeria alba =

Scientific classification
- Kingdom: Animalia
- Phylum: Mollusca
- Class: Gastropoda
- Subclass: Caenogastropoda
- Order: Neogastropoda
- Family: Ptychatractidae
- Genus: Metzgeria
- Species: M. alba

Binomial name
- Metzgeria alba (Jeffreys in Wyville-Thomson, 1873)

Synonyms
- Lathyrus albellus Dunker & Metzger, 1874; Latirus albus Wyville-Thompson, 1873; Metzgeria albella (Dunker & Metzger, 1874); Meyeria pusilla M. Sars in G. O. Sars, 1878

Species of gastropod

Metzgeria alba is a species of sea snail, a marine gastropod mollusk in the family Ptychatractidae.
