= Latiromitra styliola =

Scientific classification
- Kingdom: Animalia
- Phylum: Mollusca
- Class: Gastropoda
- Subclass: Caenogastropoda
- Order: Neogastropoda
- Family: Costellariidae
- Genus: Latiromitra
- Species: L. styliola

Binomial name
- Latiromitra styliola (Dall, 1927)

Synonyms
- Mitra styliola Dall, 1927

Species of gastropod

Latiromitra styliola is a species of sea snail. It is a marine gastropod mollusk in the family Ptychatractidae.
