= Latiromitra okinavensis =

Scientific classification
- Kingdom: Animalia
- Phylum: Mollusca
- Class: Gastropoda
- Subclass: Caenogastropoda
- Order: Neogastropoda
- Family: Costellariidae
- Genus: Latiromitra
- Species: L. okinavensis

Binomial name
- Latiromitra okinavensis (MacNeil, 1961)

Synonyms
- Benthovoluta okinavensis MacNeil, 1961; Benthovoluta sakashitai Habe, 1976

Species of gastropod

Latiromitra okinavensis is a species of sea snail, a marine gastropod mollusk in the family Ptychatractidae.
