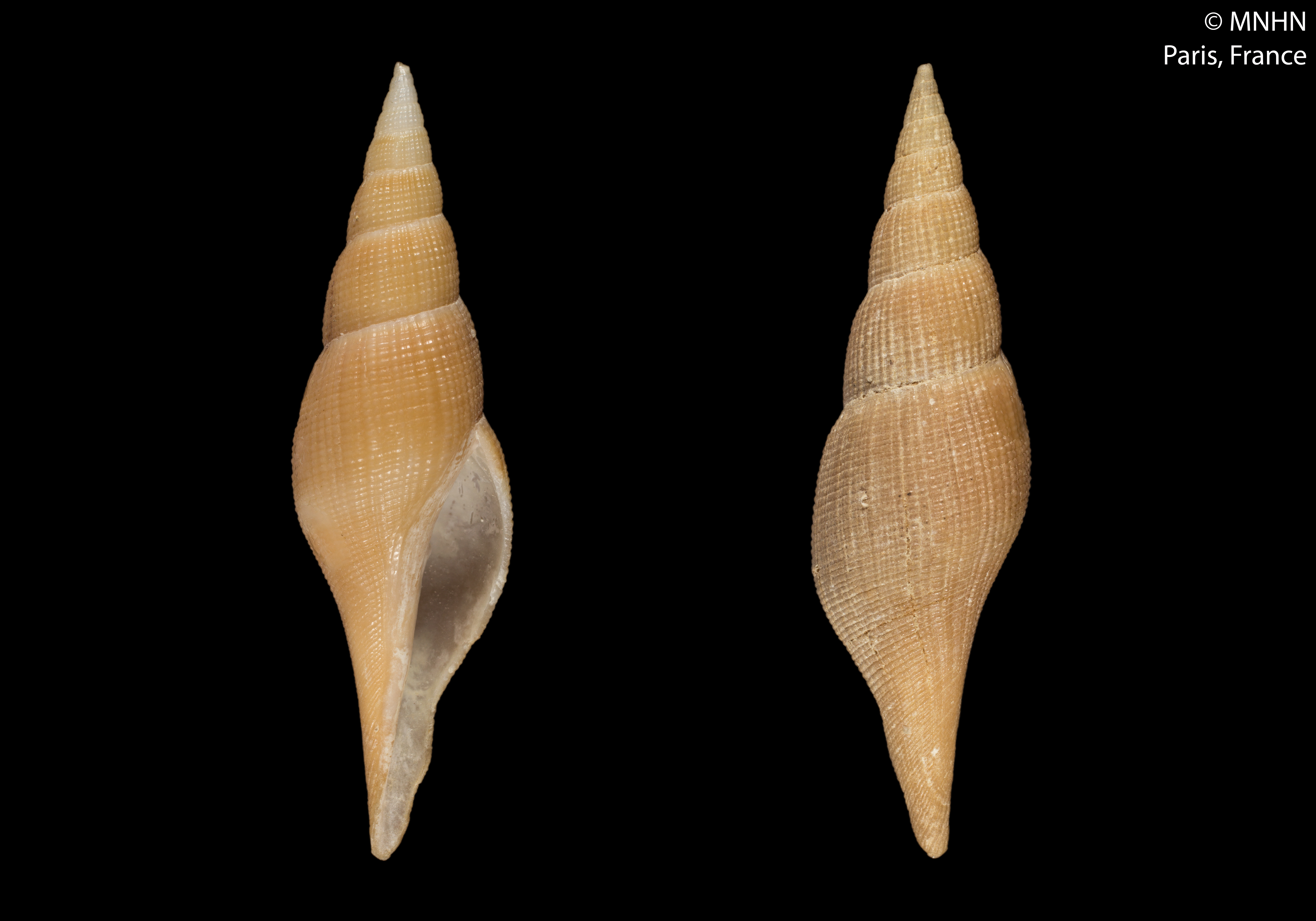
- Shell of Exilia graphiduloides (holotype at MNHN, Paris)

Scientific classification
- Kingdom: Animalia
- Phylum: Mollusca
- Class: Gastropoda
- Subclass: Caenogastropoda
- Order: Neogastropoda
- Family: Ptychatractidae
- Genus: Exilia
- Species: E. graphiduloides

Binomial name
- Exilia graphiduloides Kantor, Bouchet, 2001

= Exilia graphiduloides =

Species of gastropod

Exilia graphiduloides is a species of sea snail, a marine gastropod mollusc in the family Ptychatractidae.

== Description ==
THe length of the shell attains 53.8 mm.

== Distribution ==
This marine species occurs off New Caledonia.
