= Latiromitra aratiuncula =

Scientific classification
- Kingdom: Animalia
- Phylum: Mollusca
- Class: Gastropoda
- Subclass: Caenogastropoda
- Order: Neogastropoda
- Family: Costellariidae
- Genus: Latiromitra
- Species: L. aratiuncula

Binomial name
- Latiromitra aratiuncula (Quinn, 1981)

Synonyms
- Cyomesus aratiunculus Quinn, 1981

Species of gastropod

Latiromitra aratiuncula is a species of sea snail, a marine gastropod mollusk in the family Ptychatractidae.
