= Ptychatractus ligatus =

Scientific classification
- Kingdom: Animalia
- Phylum: Mollusca
- Class: Gastropoda
- Subclass: Caenogastropoda
- Order: Neogastropoda
- Family: Ptychatractidae
- Genus: Ptychatractus
- Species: P. ligatus

Binomial name
- Ptychatractus ligatus (Mighels & C.B. Adams, 1842)

Synonyms
- Fasciolaria ligata Mighels & C.B. Adams, 1842

Species of gastropod

Ptychatractus ligatus, common name the ligate false spindle, is a species of sea snail, a marine gastropod mollusk in the family Ptychatractidae.
