= Exilioidea rectirostris =

Scientific classification
- Kingdom: Animalia
- Phylum: Mollusca
- Class: Gastropoda
- Subclass: Caenogastropoda
- Order: Neogastropoda
- Family: Ptychatractidae
- Genus: Exilioidea
- Species: E. rectirostris

Binomial name
- Exilioidea rectirostris (Carpenter, 1864)

Synonyms
- Chrysodomus rectirostris Carpenter, 1864; Exilioidea kelseyi (Dall, 1908); Plicifusus (Microfusus) obsoletlls Talmadge, 1971; Tritonofusus (Plicifusus) kelseyi Dall, 1908

Species of gastropod

Exilioidea rectirostris is a species of sea snail, a marine gastropod mollusc in the family Ptychatractidae.
