= Exilioidea rufocaudata =

Scientific classification
- Kingdom: Animalia
- Phylum: Mollusca
- Class: Gastropoda
- Subclass: Caenogastropoda
- Order: Neogastropoda
- Family: Ptychatractidae
- Genus: Exilioidea
- Species: E. rufocaudata

Binomial name
- Exilioidea rufocaudata (Dall, 1896)

Synonyms
- Fusus rufocaudatus Dall, 1896

Species of gastropod

Exilioidea rufocaudata is a species of sea snail, a marine gastropod mollusc in the family Ptychatractidae.
