= Ptychatractus occidentalis =

Scientific classification
- Kingdom: Animalia
- Phylum: Mollusca
- Class: Gastropoda
- Subclass: Caenogastropoda
- Order: Neogastropoda
- Family: Ptychatractidae
- Genus: Ptychatractus
- Species: P. occidentalis

Binomial name
- Ptychatractus occidentalis Stearns, 1873

Synonyms
- Ptychatractus sasamorii Kuroda, 1943

Species of gastropod

Ptychatractus occidentalis is a species of sea snail, a marine gastropod mollusk in the family Ptychatractidae.
