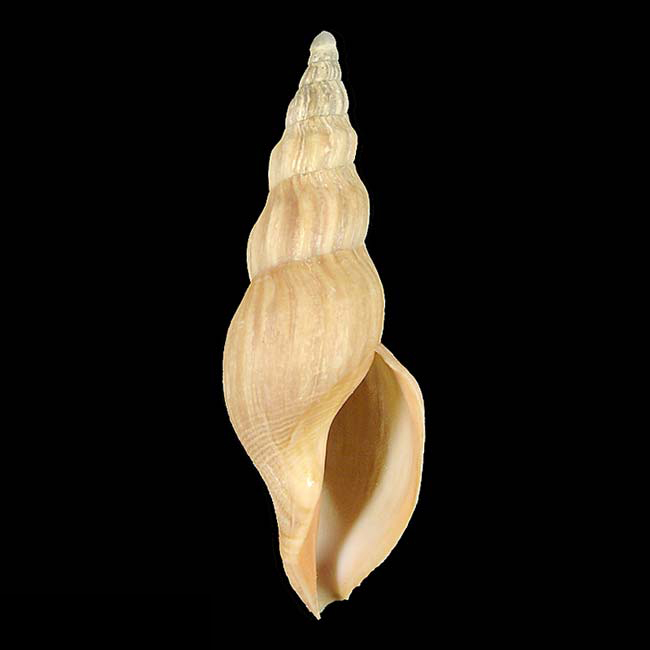
- Shell of Fusivoluta lemaitrei

Scientific classification
- Kingdom: Animalia
- Phylum: Mollusca
- Class: Gastropoda
- Subclass: Caenogastropoda
- Order: Neogastropoda
- Superfamily: Volutoidea
- Family: Volutidae
- Genus: Fusivoluta; Martens, 1902

Type species
- Voluta (Fusivoluta) anomala Martens, 1902

Synonyms
- Voluta (Fusivoluta) E. von Martens, 1902

= Fusivoluta =

Genus of gastropods

Fusivoluta is a genus of sea snails and marine gastropod mollusks in the family Volutidae.

== Species ==
Species within the genus Fusivoluta include:

- Fusivoluta anomala (Martens, 1902)
- Fusivoluta barnardi Rehder, 1969
- Fusivoluta blaizei (Barnard, 1959)
- Fusivoluta clarkei Rehder, 1969
- Fusivoluta decussata Barnard, 1959
- Fusivoluta lemaitrei Poppe, 1992
- Fusivoluta profundorum Bail & Puillandre, 2012
- Fusivoluta pyrrhostoma (Watson, 1882)
- Fusivoluta sculpturata (Tomlin, 1945)
- Fusivoluta wesselsi Kilburn, 1980

Species brought into synonymy

- Fusivoluta aikeni Lussi, 2011: synonym of Belomitra aikeni (Lussi, 2011) (original combination)
- Fusivoluta capensis (Thiele, 1925): synonym of Glypteuthria capensis Thiele, 1925
- Fusivoluta elegans Barnard, 1959: synonym of Exilia elegans (Barnard, 1959) (original combination)

== Distribution ==
This marine genus is restricted to southern African waters and adjacent areas.
