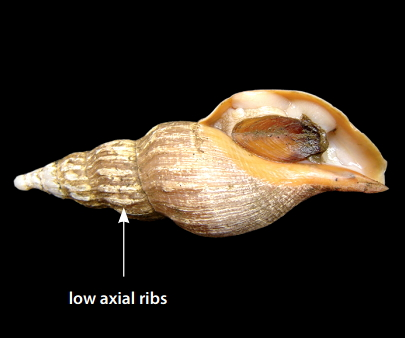

Scientific classification
- Kingdom: Animalia
- Phylum: Mollusca
- Class: Gastropoda
- Subclass: Caenogastropoda
- Order: Neogastropoda
- Family: Volutidae
- Genus: Fusivoluta
- Species: F. pyrrhostoma

Binomial name
- Fusivoluta pyrrhostoma (Watson, 1882)

Synonyms
- Fusivoluta pyrrhostoma pyrrhostoma (R. B. Watson, 1882) superseded combination; Fusus (Sipho) pyrrhostoma R. B. Watson, 1882 superseded combination; Fusus pyrrhostomaR. B. Watson, 1882 superseded combination

= Fusivoluta pyrrhostoma =

Species of gastropod

Fusivoluta pyrrhostoma, common name the flame-mouthed volute, is a species of sea snail, a marine gastropod mollusc in the family Volutidae, the volutes.

== Description ==
The length of the shell attains 90 mm.

The shell is spindle-shaped, with a relatively short and dorsally recurved siphonal canal. The spire makes up about half the total shell length, and the suture is indented. The sculpture consists of low, often slightly curved axial ribs, with the base featuring closely set spiral threads. The inner lip and columella are smooth, while the outer lip is thin, slightly flaring, and smooth on the interior. The protoconch (apex) is bulbous.

The shell ranges from pale orange-white to light apricot, covered by a thin olive-brown periostracum. The surface is often heavily eroded. The interior of the aperture is glossy, with a deep apricot color in fresh specimens, becoming more intense on the basal half of the inner lip.

== Distribution ==
This marine species is endemic to South Africa and occurs off the West coast and western Agulhas Bank (Lambert’s Bay to Mossel Bay), at depths between 70 m and 400 m.
