= Exilia elegans =

Scientific classification
- Kingdom: Animalia
- Phylum: Mollusca
- Class: Gastropoda
- Subclass: Caenogastropoda
- Order: Neogastropoda
- Family: Ptychatractidae
- Genus: Exilia
- Species: E. elegans

Binomial name
- Exilia elegans (Barnard, 1959)

Synonyms
- Fusivoluta elegans Barnard, 1959

Species of gastropod

Exilia elegans is a species of sea snail, a marine gastropod mollusk in the family Ptychatractidae.
