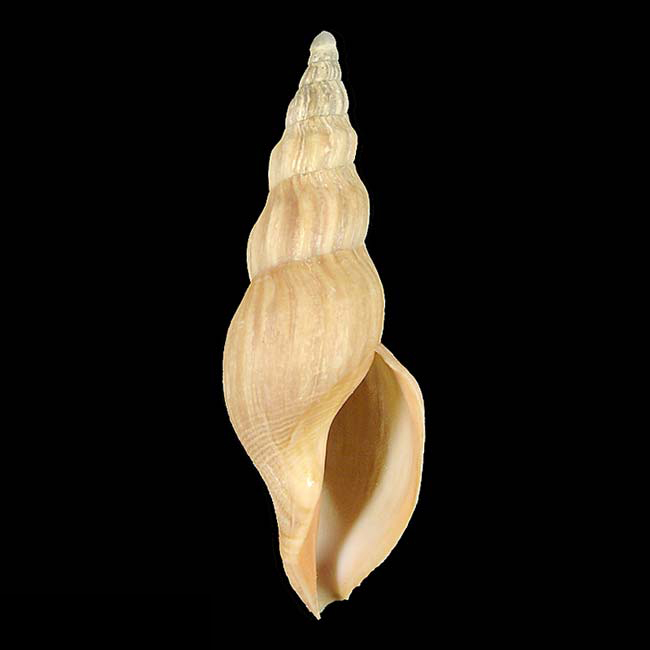

Scientific classification
- Kingdom: Animalia
- Phylum: Mollusca
- Class: Gastropoda
- Subclass: Caenogastropoda
- Order: Neogastropoda
- Family: Volutidae
- Genus: Fusivoluta
- Species: F. lemaitrei

Binomial name
- Fusivoluta lemaitrei Poppe, 1992

= Fusivoluta lemaitrei =

Species of gastropod

Fusivoluta lemaitrei is a species of sea snail, a marine gastropod mollusc in the family Volutidae.
