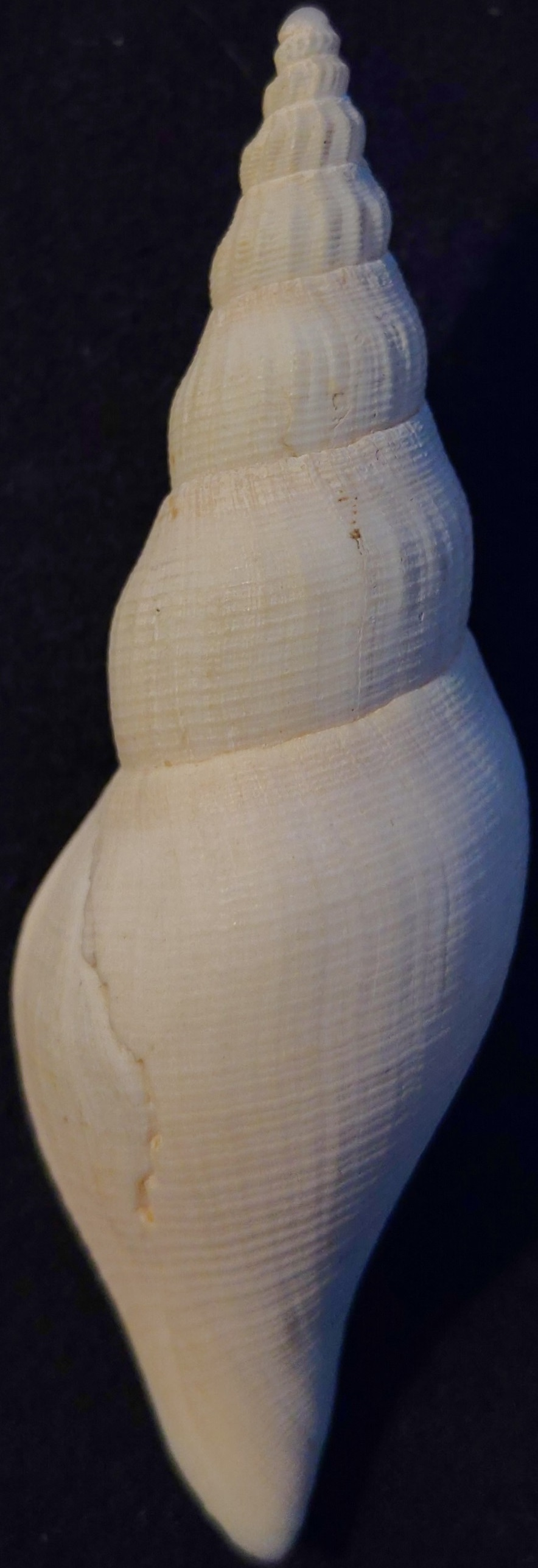

Scientific classification
- Kingdom: Animalia
- Phylum: Mollusca
- Class: Gastropoda
- Subclass: Caenogastropoda
- Order: Neogastropoda
- Family: Volutidae
- Genus: Fusivoluta
- Species: F. clarkei

Binomial name
- Fusivoluta clarkei Rehder, 1969

= Fusivoluta clarkei =

Species of gastropod

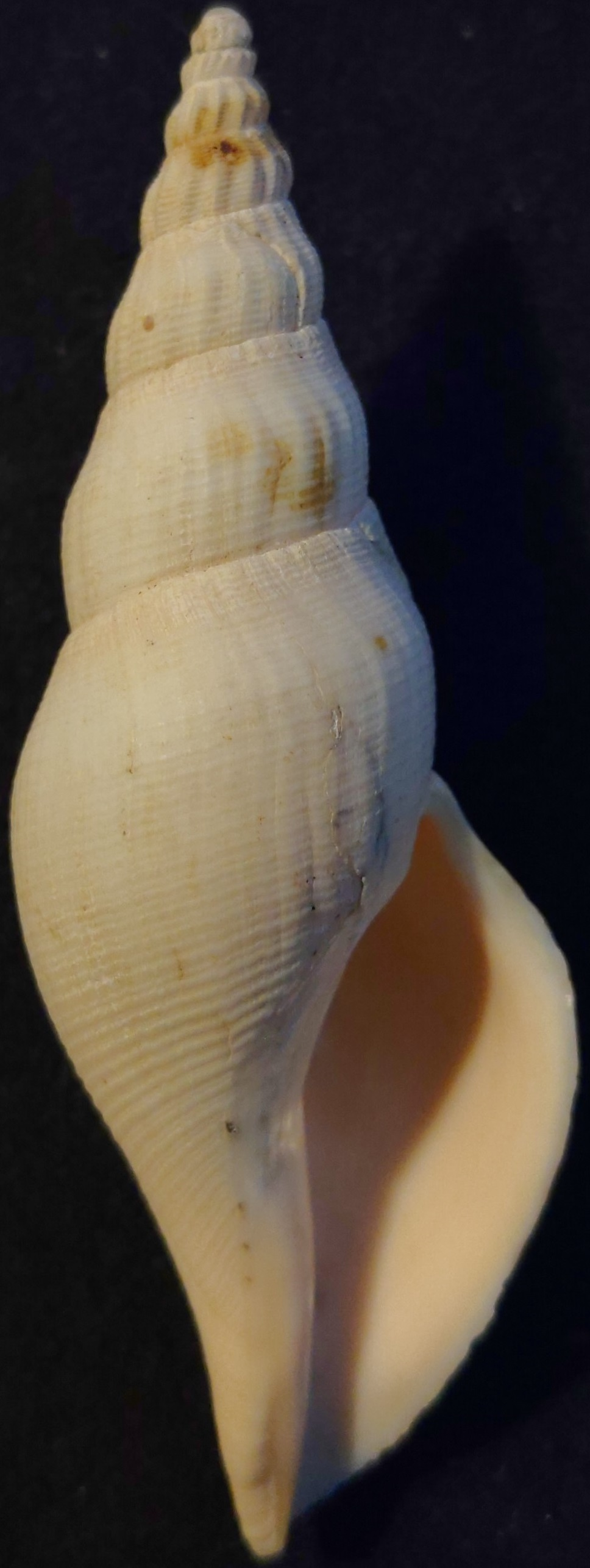

Fusivoluta clarkei is a species of sea snail, a marine gastropod mollusc in the family Volutidae, the volutes.
