= Fusivoluta wesselsi =

Scientific classification
- Kingdom: Animalia
- Phylum: Mollusca
- Class: Gastropoda
- Subclass: Caenogastropoda
- Order: Neogastropoda
- Family: Volutidae
- Genus: Fusivoluta
- Species: F. wesselsi

Binomial name
- Fusivoluta wesselsi Kilburn, 1980

Species of gastropod

Fusivoluta wesselsi is a species of sea snail, a marine gastropod mollusc in the family Volutidae, the volutes.
