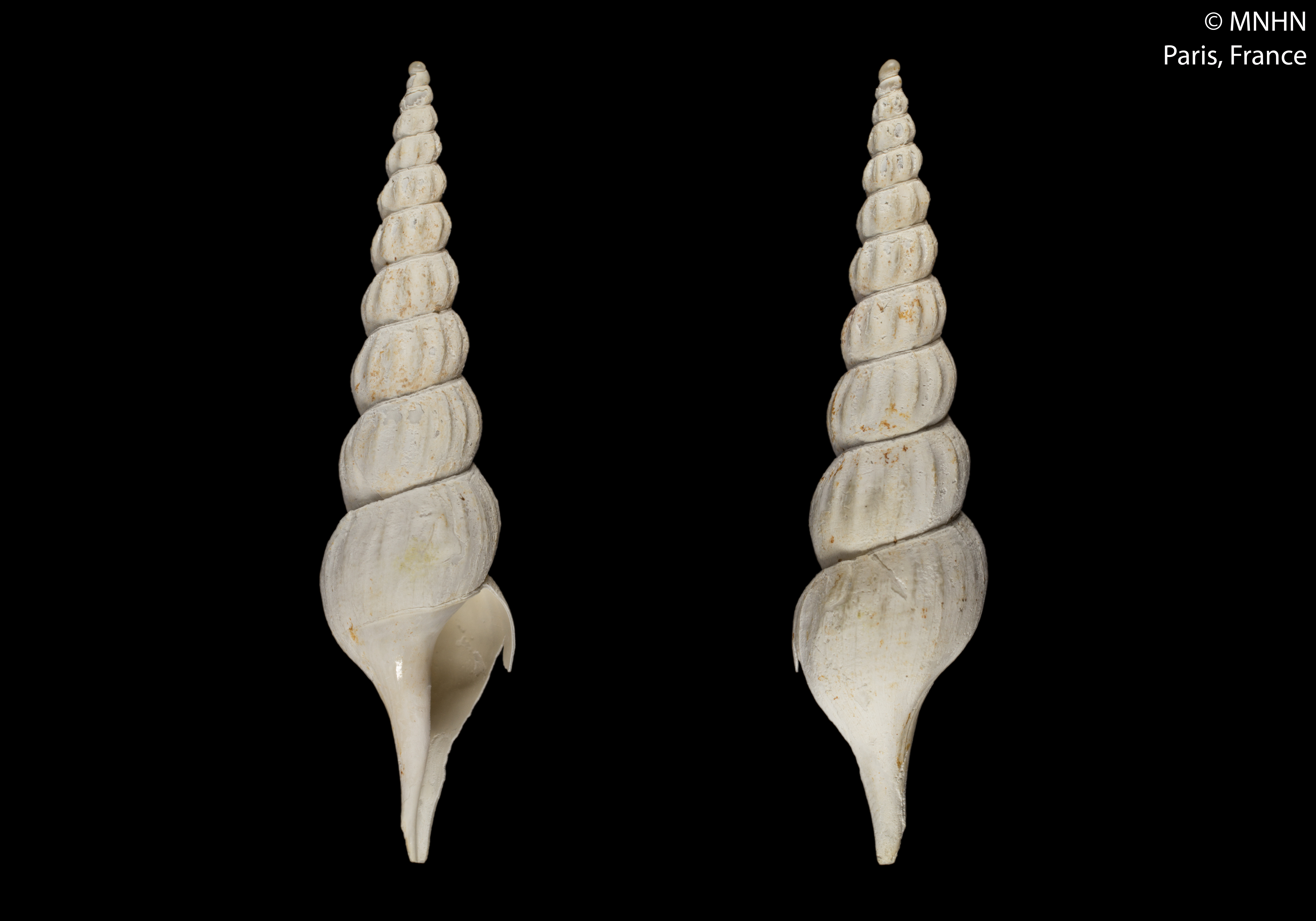
- Shell of Exilioidea atlantica (holotype at MNHN, Paris)

Scientific classification
- Kingdom: Animalia
- Phylum: Mollusca
- Class: Gastropoda
- Subclass: Caenogastropoda
- Order: Neogastropoda
- Superfamily: Turbinelloidea
- Family: Ptychatractidae
- Genus: Exilioidea; Grant & Gale, 1931

Type species
- Chrysodomus rectirostris Carpenter, 1864

= Exilioidea =

Genus of gastropods

Exilioidea is a genus of sea snails, marine gastropod mollusks in the family Ptychatractidae.

== Species ==
Species within the genus Exilioidea include:

- Exilioidea atlantica Bouchet & Warén, 1988
- Exilioidea costulata Bouchet et Warén, 1988
- Exilioidea indica Bouchet et Warén, 1988
- Exilioidea kelseyi (Dall, 1908)
- Exilioidea rectirostris (Carpenter, 1864)
- Exilioidea rufocaudata (Dall, 1896)
