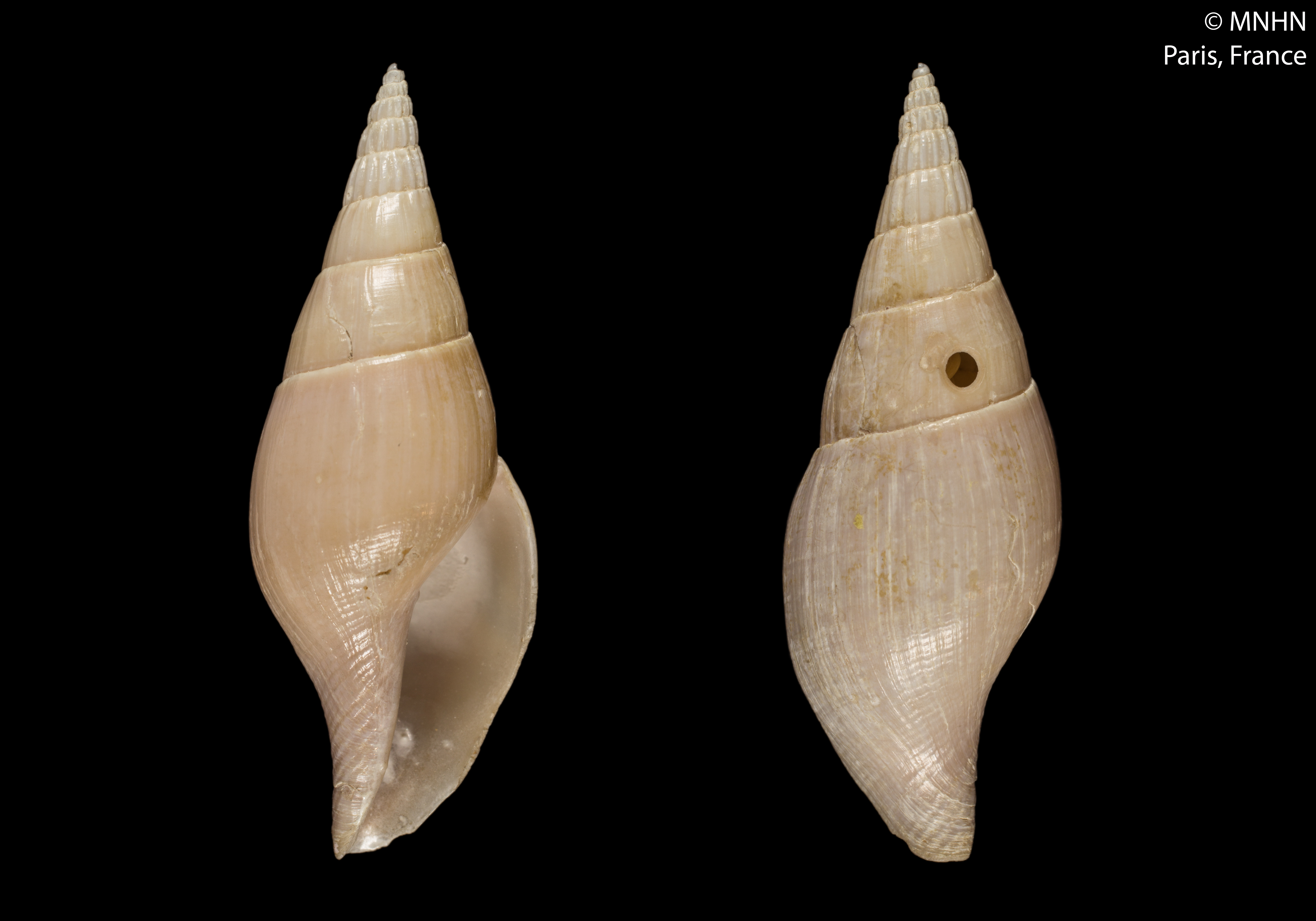
- Shell of Latiromitra crosnieri (holotype at MNHN, Paris)

Scientific classification
- Kingdom: Animalia
- Phylum: Mollusca
- Class: Gastropoda
- Subclass: Caenogastropoda
- Order: Neogastropoda
- Family: Costellariidae
- Genus: Latiromitra
- Species: L. crosnieri

Binomial name
- Latiromitra crosnieri Bouchet & Kantor, 2000

= Latiromitra crosnieri =

Species of gastropod

Latiromitra crosnieri is a species of sea snail, a marine gastropod mollusk in the family Costellariidae.

== Description ==
The length of the shell attains 41.2 mm.

== Distribution ==
This marine species occurs off Madagascar.
