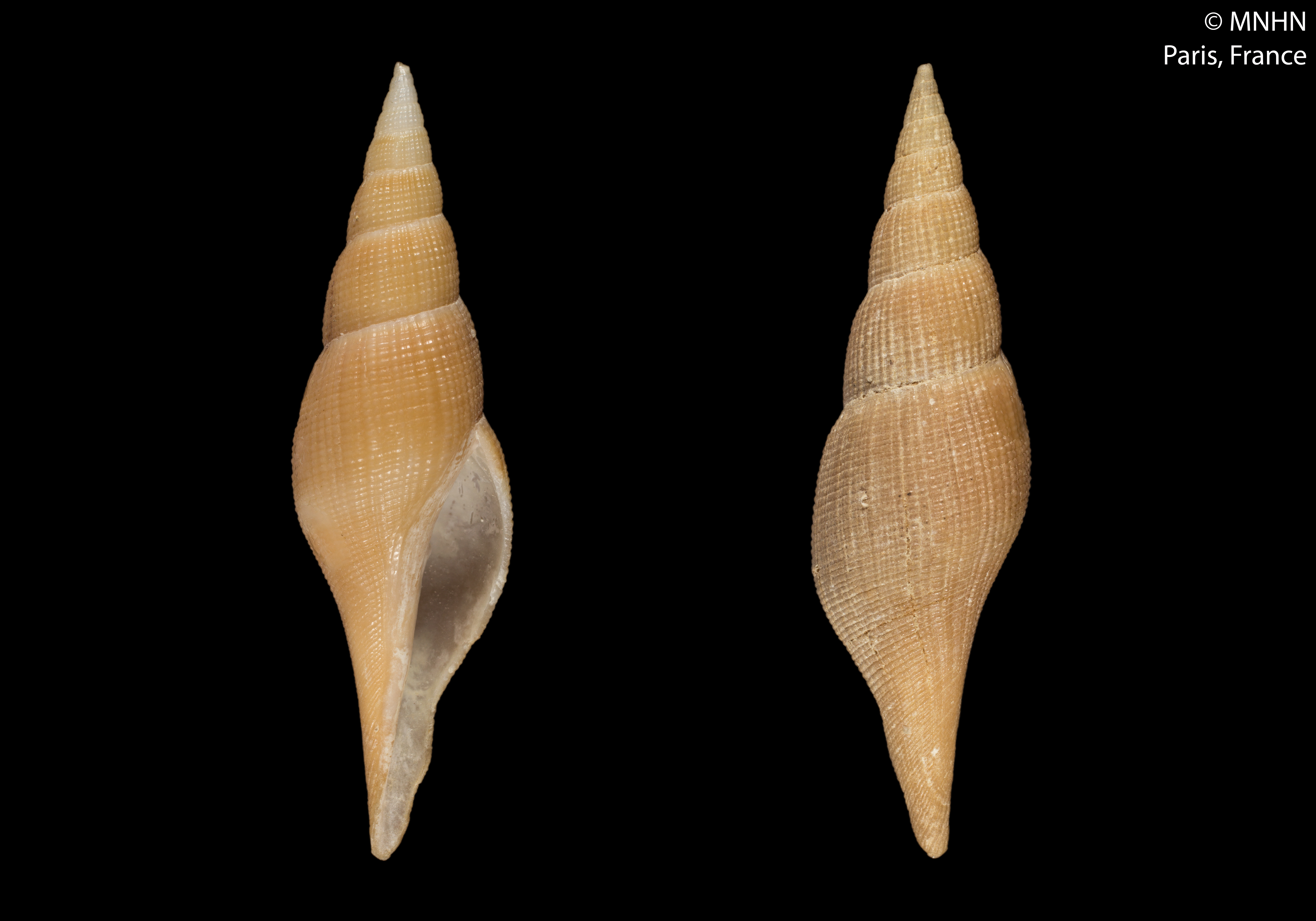
- Shell of Exilia graphiduloides

Scientific classification
- Kingdom: Animalia
- Phylum: Mollusca
- Class: Gastropoda
- Subclass: Caenogastropoda
- Order: Neogastropoda
- Family: Ptychatractidae
- Genus: Exilia; Conrad, 1860

Type species
- †Exilia pergracilis Conrad, 1860

Synonyms
- Benthovoluta Kuroda & Habe, 1950; Chathamidia Dell, 1956; Daphnella (Surculina) Dall, 1908; Graphidula Stephenson, 1941; Mesorhytis Meek, 1876; Mitraefusus Bellardi, 1873; Palaeorhaphis Stewart, 1927; Phenacoptygma Dall, 1918; Surculina Dall, 1908; Zexilia Finlay, 1926

= Exilia (gastropod) =

Genus of gastropods

Exilia is a genus of sea snails in the family Ptychatractidae.

== Species ==
As of 2020, species within the genus Exilia include:

- †Exilia alanbeui S. Nielsen, 2005
- Exilia blanda (Dall, 1908)
- Exilia claydoni (Harasewych, 1987)
- Exilia cognata Kantor, Puillandre & Bouchet, 2020
- Exilia cortezi (Dall, 1908)
- Exilia crassicostata Suter, 1917
- †Exilia dalli Suter, 1907
- Exilia elegans (Barnard, 1959)
- Exilia expeditionis (Dell, 1956)
- Exilia fedosovi Kantor, Puillandre & Bouchet, 2020
- †Exilia frejaea Schnetler & M. S. Nielsen, 2018
- Exilia gracilior (Rehder, 1967)
- Exilia graphiduloides Kantor & Bouchet, 2001
- †Exilia hampdenensis (Marwick, 1942
- Exilia hilgendorfi (Martens, 1897)
- Exilia karukera Kantor, Puillandre & Bouchet, 2020
- Exilia kiwi Kantor & Bouchet, 2001
- Exilia krigei (Kilburn, 1971)
- †Exilia leachi (Marwick, 1931)
- †Exilia nodulifera (Marwick, 1931)
- †Exilia pergracilis Conrad, 1860
- †Exilia pergracilis (Aldrich, 1886) (secondary homonym of E. pergracilis Conrad, 1860)
- Exilia prellei (Bozzetti, 2001)
- †Exilia terebriformis (Stephenson, 1941)
- Exilia vagrans Kantor & Bouchet, 2001
- †Exilia vixcostata (Finlay & Marwick, 1937)
- †Exilia waihaoensis Suter, 1917
- †Exilia wellmani P. A. Maxwell, 1988
- †Exilia zelandica (P. Marshall, 1918)
