= Metzgeria californica =

Scientific classification
- Kingdom: Animalia
- Phylum: Mollusca
- Class: Gastropoda
- Subclass: Caenogastropoda
- Order: Neogastropoda
- Family: Ptychatractidae
- Genus: Metzgeria
- Species: M. californica

Binomial name
- Metzgeria californica Dall, 1903

Species of gastropod

Metzgeria californica is a species of sea snail, a marine gastropod mollusc in the family Ptychatractidae.
