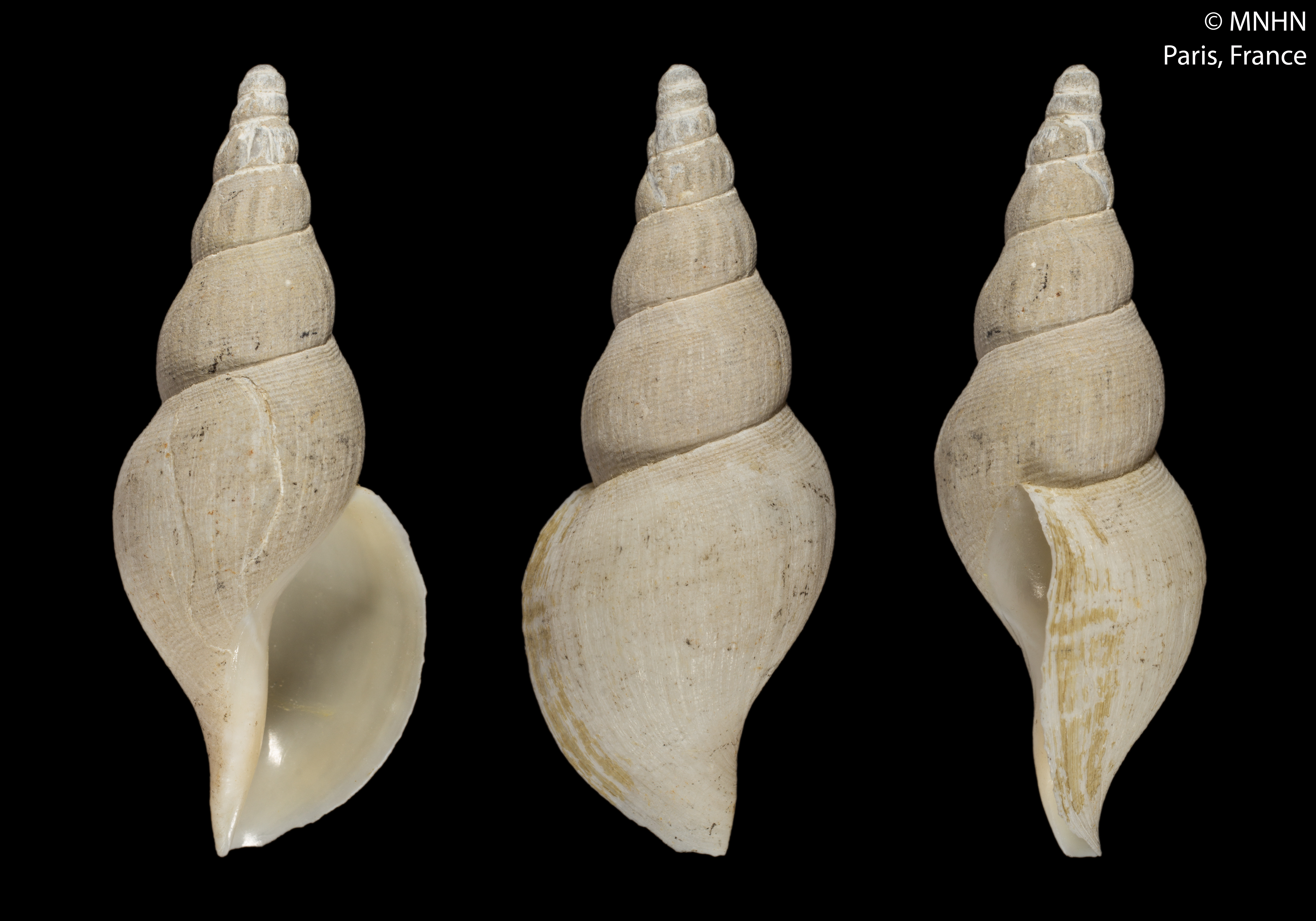

Scientific classification
- Kingdom: Animalia
- Phylum: Mollusca
- Class: Gastropoda
- Subclass: Caenogastropoda
- Order: Neogastropoda
- Family: Volutidae
- Genus: Fusivoluta
- Species: F. profundorum

Binomial name
- Fusivoluta profundorum Bail & Puillandre, 2012

= Fusivoluta profundorum =

Species of sea snail

Fusivoluta profundorum is a species of sea snail, a marine gastropod mollusc in the family Volutidae, the volutes.

== Description ==
The shell reaches up to 49 mm in size.

== Distribution ==
This species has been observed off the coast of Mozambique.
