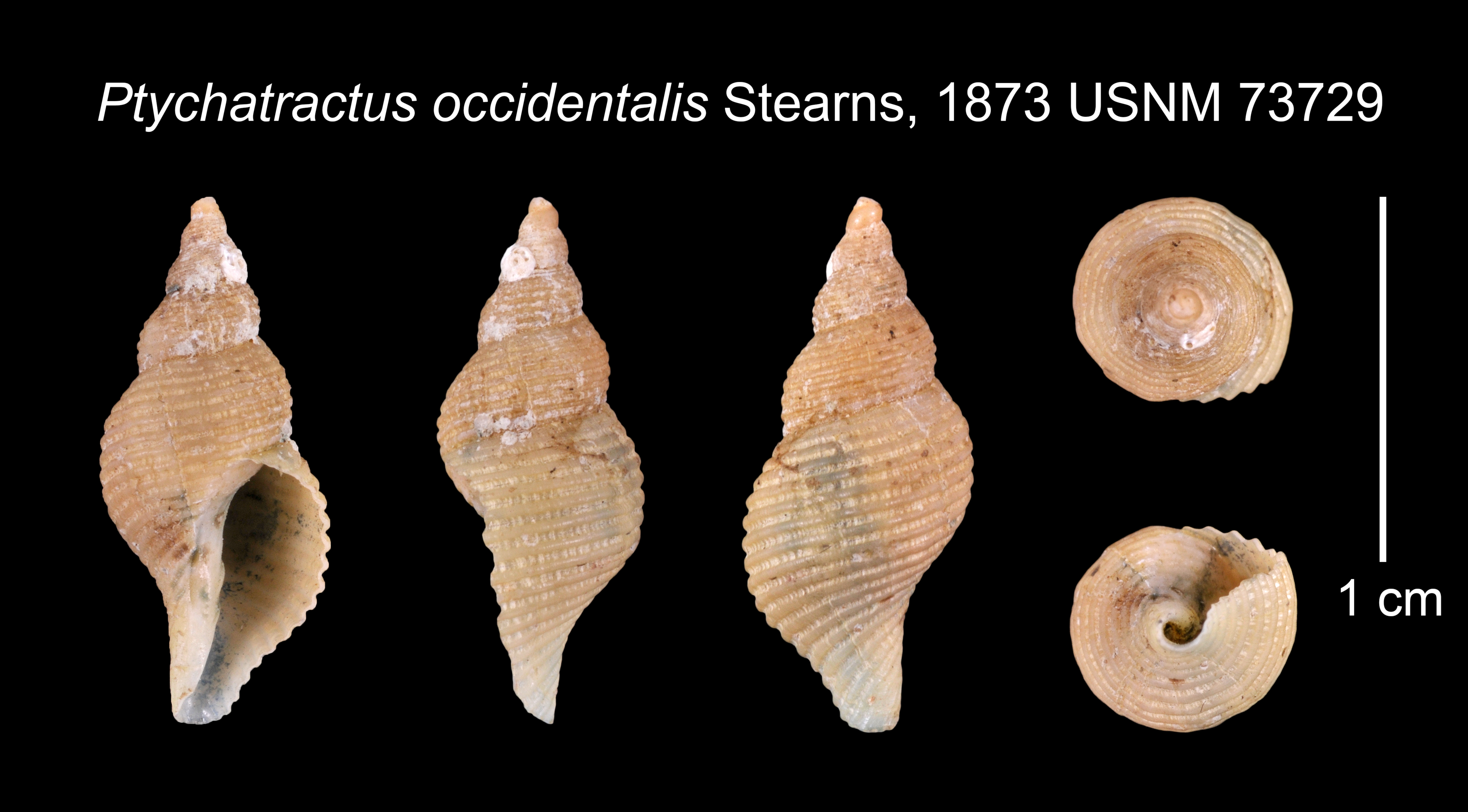
- Ptychatractus occidentalis (a species within the genus)

Scientific classification
- Kingdom: Animalia
- Phylum: Mollusca
- Class: Gastropoda
- Subclass: Caenogastropoda
- Order: Neogastropoda
- Family: Ptychatractidae
- Genus: Ptychatractus; Stimpson, 1865

= Ptychatractus =

Genus of gastropods

Ptychatractus is a genus of sea snails, marine gastropod mollusks in the family Ptychatractidae.

== Species ==
Species within the genus Ptychatractus include:

- Ptychatractus ligatus (Mighels & C.B. Adams, 1842)
- Ptychatractus occidentalis Stearns, 1873
- Ptychatractus youngi Kilburn, 1975
