= Fusivoluta sculpturata =

Scientific classification
- Kingdom: Animalia
- Phylum: Mollusca
- Class: Gastropoda
- Subclass: Caenogastropoda
- Order: Neogastropoda
- Family: Volutidae
- Genus: Fusivoluta
- Species: F. sculpturata

Binomial name
- Fusivoluta sculpturata (Tomlin, 1945)

Species of gastropod

Fusivoluta sculpturata is a species of sea snail, a marine gastropod mollusc in the family Volutidae, the volutes.
