= Fusivoluta barnardi =

Scientific classification
- Kingdom: Animalia
- Phylum: Mollusca
- Class: Gastropoda
- Subclass: Caenogastropoda
- Order: Neogastropoda
- Family: Volutidae
- Genus: Fusivoluta
- Species: F. barnardi

Binomial name
- Fusivoluta barnardi Rehder, 1969

Species of gastropod

Fusivoluta barnardi is a species of sea snail, a marine gastropod mollusc in the family Volutidae, the volutes.

== Description ==
Shell size 80 mm.

== Distribution ==
Mozambique.
