= Latiromitra niveobabelis =

Scientific classification
- Kingdom: Animalia
- Phylum: Mollusca
- Class: Gastropoda
- Subclass: Caenogastropoda
- Order: Neogastropoda
- Superfamily: Turbinelloidea
- Family: Costellariidae
- Genus: Latiromitra
- Species: L. niveobabelis

Binomial name
- Latiromitra niveobabelis Garcia, 2015

Species of gastropod

Latiromitra niveobabelis is a species of sea snail, a marine gastropod mollusk, in the family Costellariidae, the ribbed miters.

== Distribution ==
This species occurs in Gulf of Mexico.
