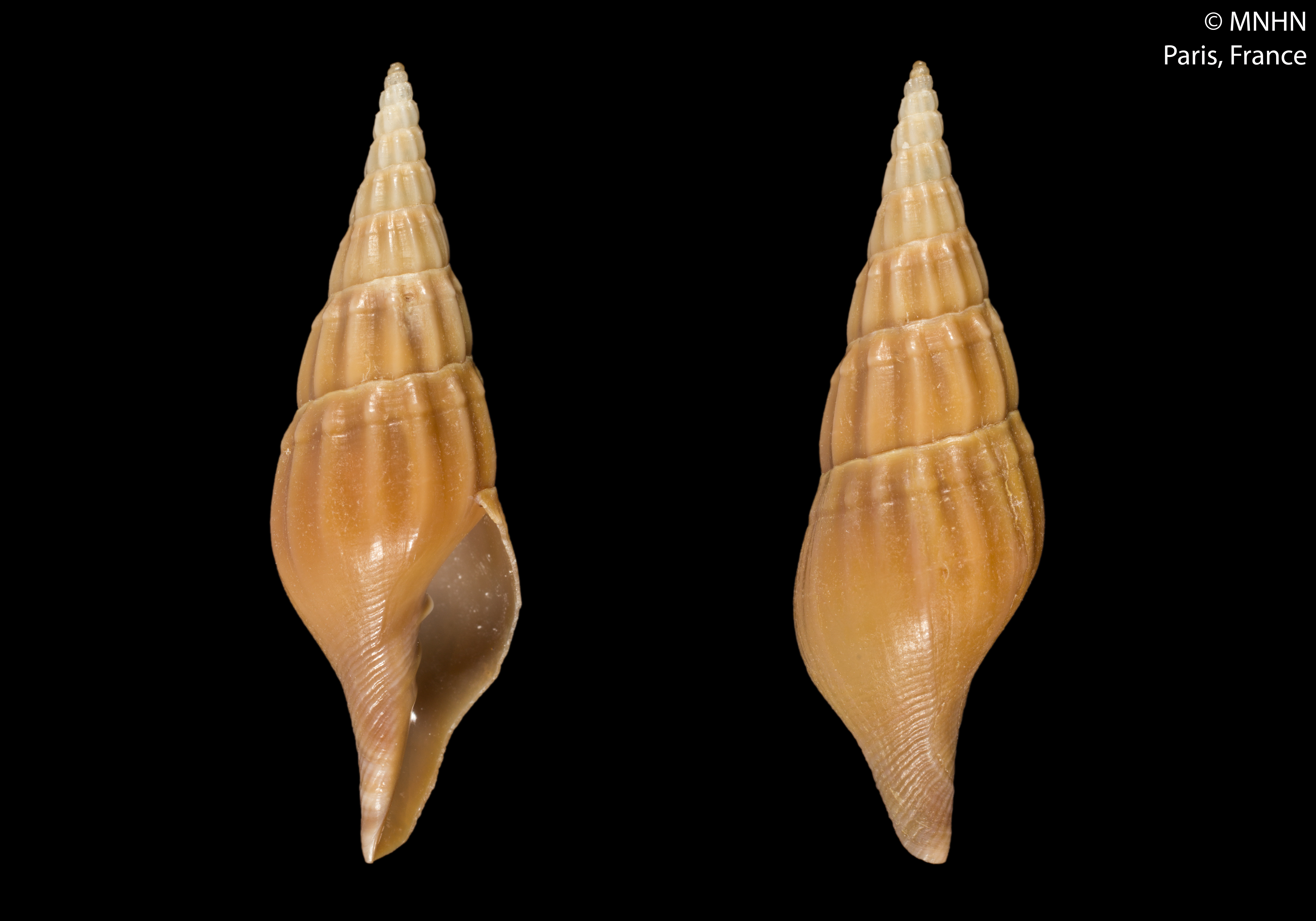
- Shell of Latiromitra cacozeliana (holotype at MNHN, Paris)

Scientific classification
- Kingdom: Animalia
- Phylum: Mollusca
- Class: Gastropoda
- Subclass: Caenogastropoda
- Order: Neogastropoda
- Family: Costellariidae
- Genus: Latiromitra
- Species: L. cacozeliana

Binomial name
- Latiromitra cacozeliana Bouchet & Kantor, 2000

= Latiromitra cacozeliana =

Species of gastropod

Latiromitra cacozeliana is a species of sea snail, a marine gastropod mollusk in the family Costellariidae.

== Description ==
The length of the shell attains 33.3 mm.

== Distribution ==
This marine species occurs off Vanuatu.
