= Fusivoluta anomala =

Scientific classification
- Kingdom: Animalia
- Phylum: Mollusca
- Class: Gastropoda
- Subclass: Caenogastropoda
- Order: Neogastropoda
- Family: Volutidae
- Genus: Fusivoluta
- Species: F. anomala

Binomial name
- Fusivoluta anomala (Martens, 1902)

Species of gastropod

Fusivoluta anomala is a species of sea snail, a marine gastropod mollusc in the family Volutidae, the volutes.
