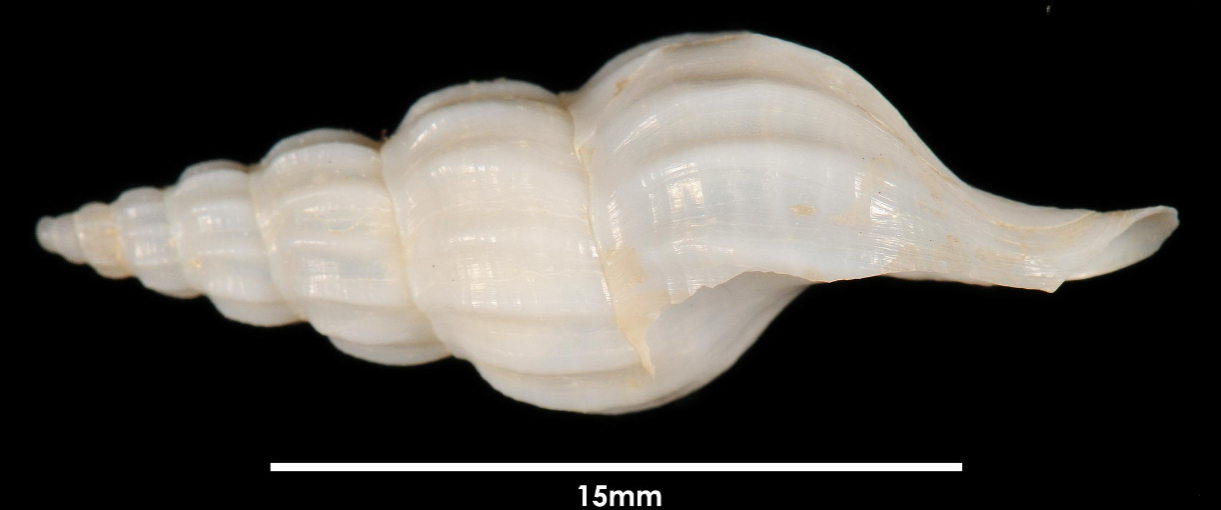
- Shell of Metzgeria problematica (specimen at the Smithsonian Institution)

Scientific classification
- Kingdom: Animalia
- Phylum: Mollusca
- Class: Gastropoda
- Subclass: Caenogastropoda
- Order: Neogastropoda
- Family: Ptychatractidae
- Genus: Metzgeria
- Species: M. problematica

Binomial name
- Metzgeria problematica (Ponder, 1968)

Synonyms
- Vexillum (Latiromitra) problematicum Ponder, 1968

= Metzgeria problematica =

Species of gastropod

Metzgeria problematica is a species of sea snail, a marine gastropod mollusc in the family Ptychatractidae.

== Distribution ==
This species occurs off the Antipodes Islands, New Zealand, South Pacific Ocean.
