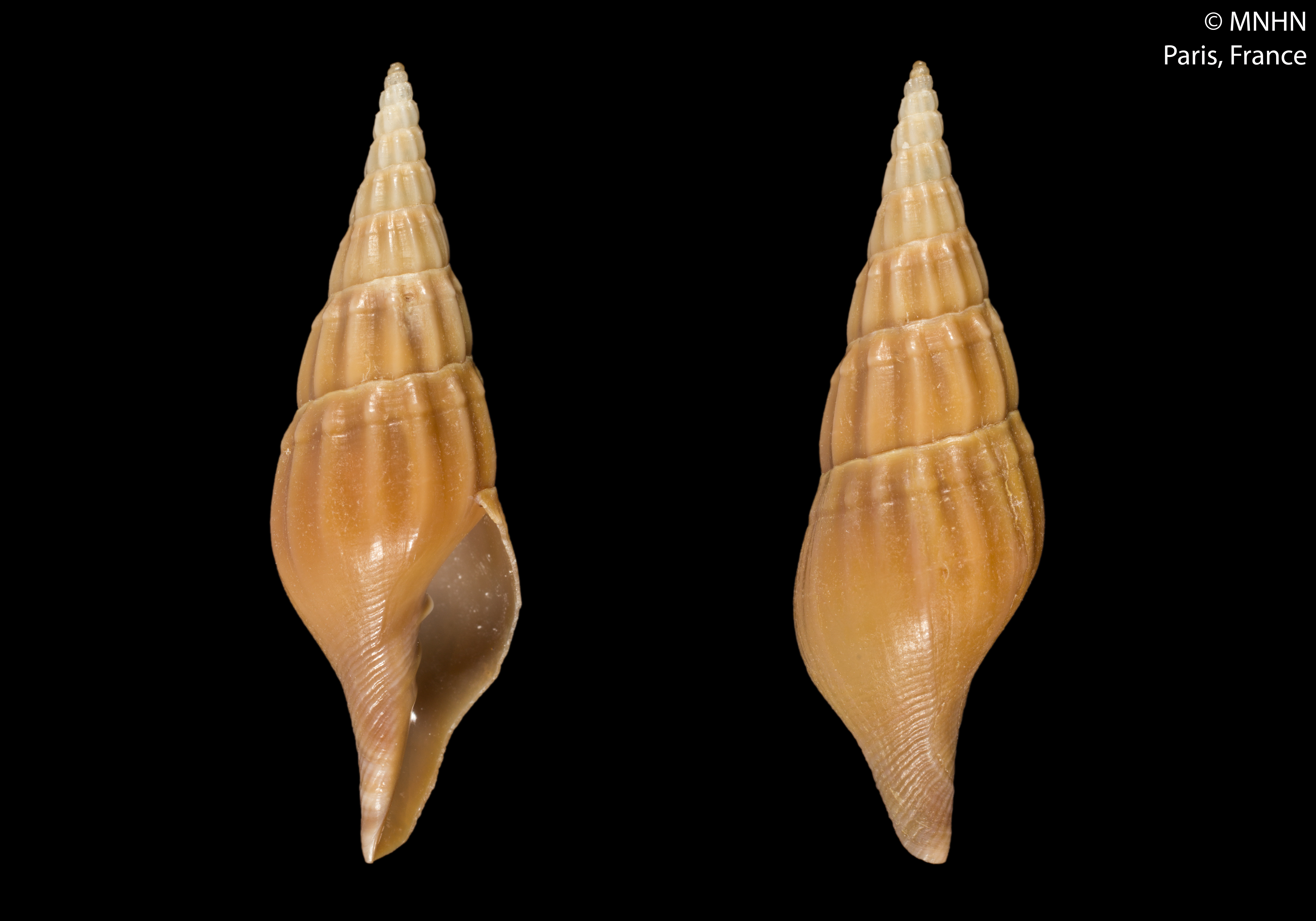
- Shell of Latiromitra cacozeliana

Scientific classification
- Kingdom: Animalia
- Phylum: Mollusca
- Class: Gastropoda
- Subclass: Caenogastropoda
- Order: Neogastropoda
- Superfamily: Turbinelloidea
- Family: Costellariidae
- Genus: Latiromitra; Locard, 1897

Type species
- Latiromitra specialis Locard, 1897

Synonyms
- Cyomesus Quinn, 1981; Okinawavoluta Noda, 1980; Vexillum (Latiromitra) Locard, 1897

= Latiromitra =

Genus of gastropods

Latiromitra is a genus of sea snails, marine gastropod mollusks in the family Costellariidae.

== Species ==
Species within the genus Latiromitra include:

- Latiromitra aratiuncula (Quinn, 1981)
- Latiromitra barthelowi (Bartsch, 1942)
- Latiromitra cacozeliana Bouchet & Kantor, 2000
- Latiromitra costata (Dall, 1890)
- Latiromitra crosnieri Bouchet & Kantor, 2000
- Latiromitra cryptodon (P. Fischer, 1882)
- Latiromitra delicatula (Shikama, 1971)
- Latiromitra meekiana (Dall, 1889)
- Latiromitra niveobabelis Garcia, 2015
- Latiromitra okinavensis (MacNeil, 1961)
- Latiromitra paiciorum Bouchet & Kantor, 2000
- † Latiromitra pauciplicata (Yokoyama, 1928)
- Latiromitra styliola (Dall, 1927)

Species brought into synonymy

- Latiromitra bairdii (Dall, 1889): synonym of Volutomitra bairdii (Dall, 1889)
- Latiromitra specialis Locard, 1897: synonym of Latiromitra cryptodon (P. Fischer, 1882)
- Vexillum (Latiromitra) problematicum Ponder, 1968: synonym of Metzgeria problematica (Ponder, 1968) ·

== Classification ==
Biota > Animalia (Kingdom) > Mollusca (Phylum) > Gastropoda (Class) > Caenogastropoda (Subclass) > Neogastropoda (Order) > Turbinelloidea (Superfamily) > Costellariidae (Family) > Latiromitra (Genus)
