= Fusivoluta blaizei =

Scientific classification
- Kingdom: Animalia
- Phylum: Mollusca
- Class: Gastropoda
- Subclass: Caenogastropoda
- Order: Neogastropoda
- Family: Volutidae
- Genus: Fusivoluta
- Species: F. blaizei

Binomial name
- Fusivoluta blaizei (Barnard, 1959)

Species of gastropod

Fusivoluta blaizei is a species of sea snail, a marine gastropod mollusc in the family Volutidae, the volutes.
