= Latiromitra costata =

Scientific classification
- Kingdom: Animalia
- Phylum: Mollusca
- Class: Gastropoda
- Subclass: Caenogastropoda
- Order: Neogastropoda
- Superfamily: Turbinelloidea
- Family: Costellariidae
- Genus: Latiromitra
- Species: L. costata

Binomial name
- Latiromitra costata (Dall, 1890)

Synonyms
- Cyomesus costatus (Dall, 1890); Fasciolaria (Mesorhytis) costatus Dall, 1890; Metzgeria costata (Dall, 1890)

Species of gastropod

Latiromitra costata is a species of sea snail, a marine gastropod mollusk, in the family Costellariidae, the ribbed miters.
