= Exilia =

Italian nu metal band

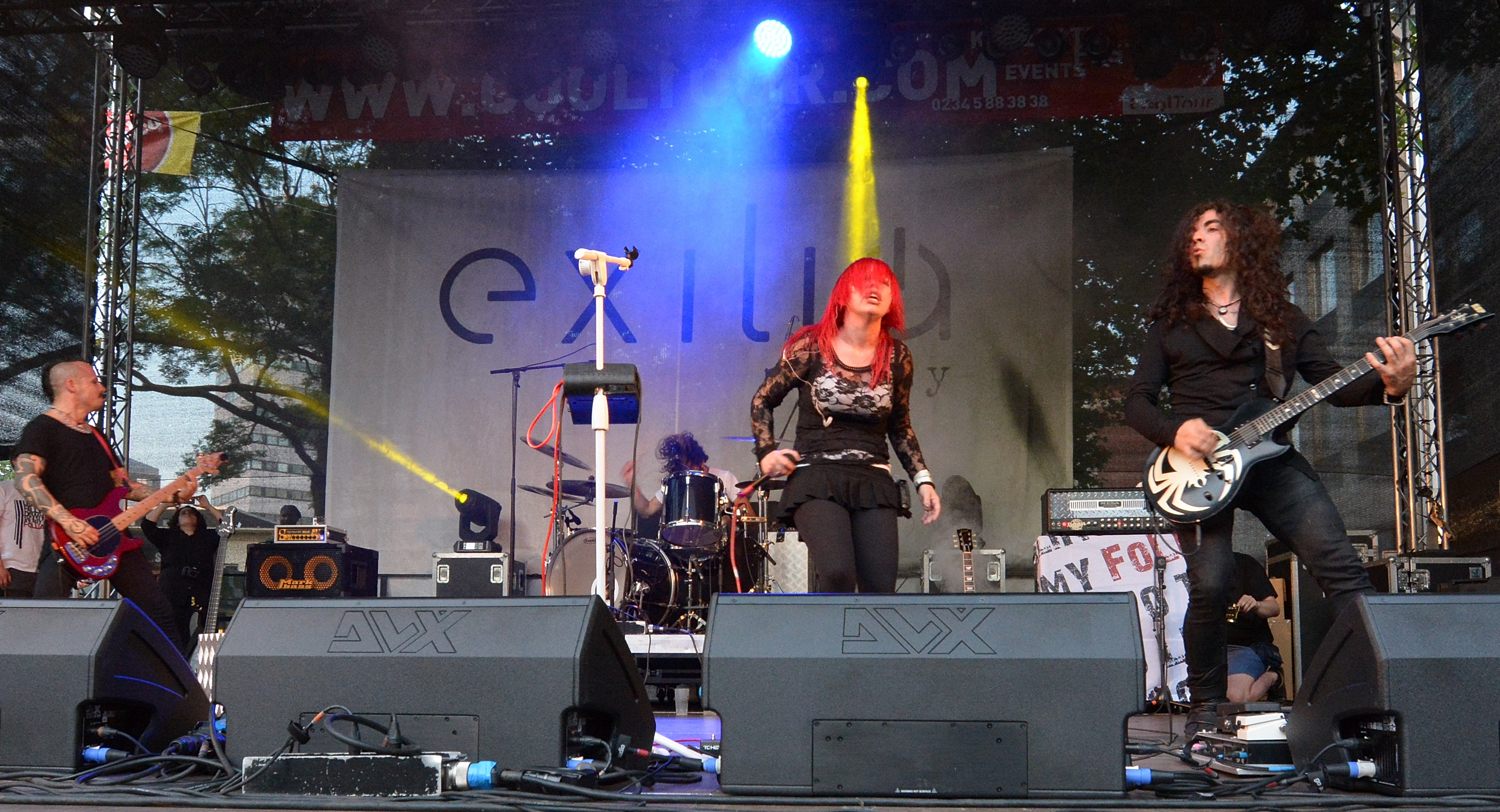
- Exilia at Bochum Total 2015

Background information
- Origin: Milan, Italy
- Genres: Nu metal, alternative metal
- Years active: 1998–present
- Members: Masha Mysmane (vocals); Wolve (guitar); Simone Matteo Tiraboschi (bass); Mark Campailla (drums)
- Website: exiliamusic.com

Exilia is an Italian nu metal band from Milan. It was formed in 1998 and as of 2022 is composed of vocalist Masha Mysmane, guitarist Wolve, bassist Simone Matteo Tiraboschi, and drummer Mark Campailla. They have played with a number of bands while on tour, including Otep, Rammstein, HIM, Ill Niño, Die Ärzte, P!NK, In Extremo, Paradise Lost, and Guano Apes.

== History ==
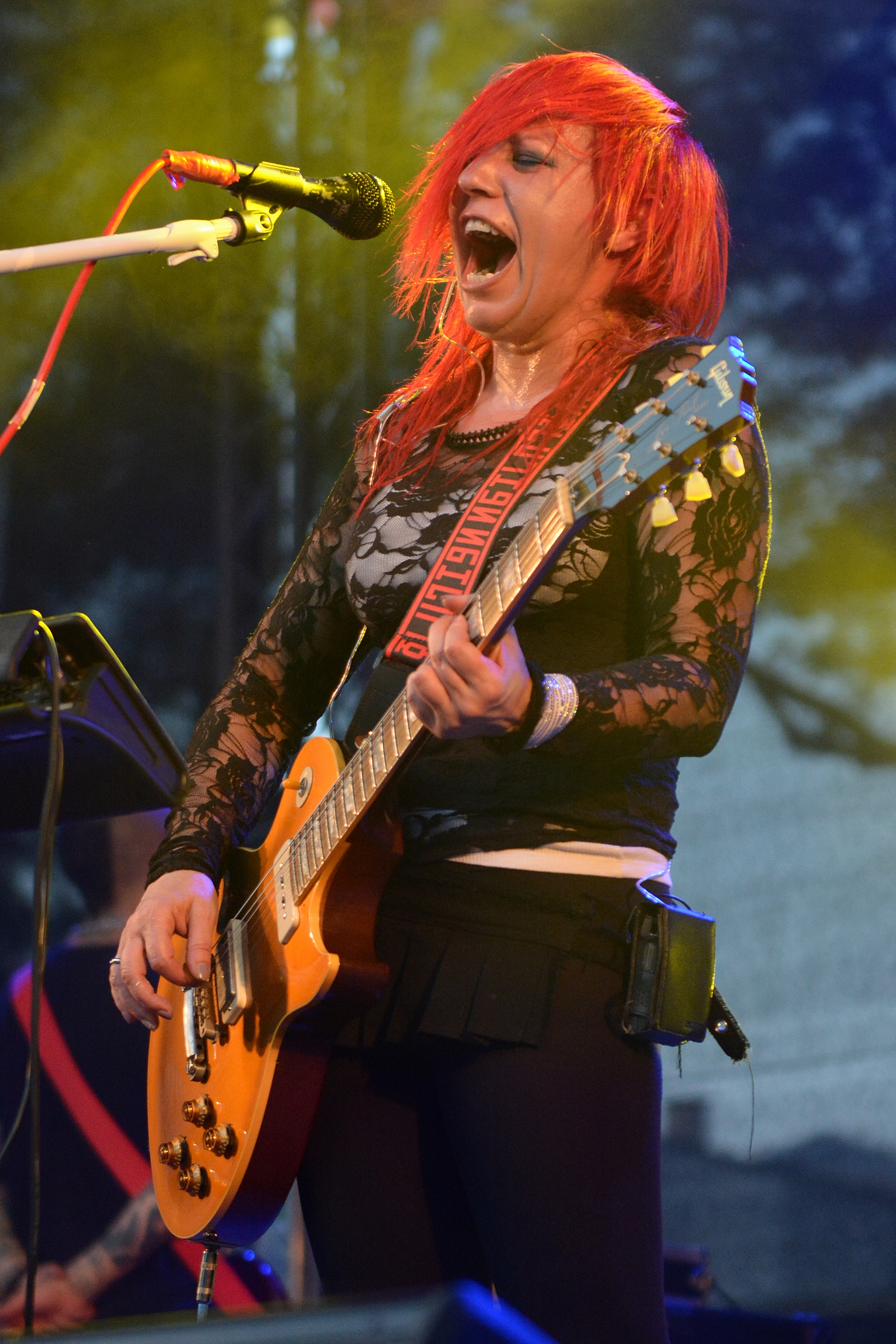
Mysmane at Bochum Total 2015

Exilia was formed in 1998 after Milanese vocalist Masha Mysmane and guitarist Elioalien met at a music store. Mysmane chose the name Exilia due to its Latin meaning "to release energy" because she felt its "power, the immediacy, the fact that it was 'female' and important" was at the core of the music she wanted the band to create. Alternative music was unusual in Italy at the time, making it difficult to break into the more mainstream market deluged by pop and dance music. Rightside Up, the band's first album, was released in 2000 by No Disc/Universal and was followed by a European tour.

In 2002, Exilia won MTV's Newcomers Award. The following year, they released the EP "Underdog" and appeared at several festivals, including Taubertal, Forestglade, and MTV's Campus Invasion. Their next release was in March 2004 on the compilation CD Crossing All Over Vol. 17, whereupon their song "I Guess You Know" appeared alongside music from bands such as Coldplay, Nickelback, Radiohead, and Clawfinger.

Exilia filmed its first music video in Cologne, Germany in April 2004 for the song "Stop Playing God". The same month, a limited edition EP of their next album, Unleashed, was released and featured the lead singer of In Extremo on the track "I Guess You Know". The album was released in May. Their third album, Can't Break Me Down, was released in 2005 and sat at #59 on the German charts while its namesake song was at #64. The song was later turned into a music video and was used as the theme song for the German film Der Clown.

Nobody Excluded, the band's fourth album, was recorded in early 2006 in an old German cotton mill that had been turned into a studio as well as during their first trip to the United States, where they participated in the CaptivaMusicGroups SXSW showcases in Austin, Texas. The album was released on 21 July 2006. Exilia appeared at the Summer Breeze Open Air in Germany in August 2006 and shortly after announced that their European tour was to be postponed to spring 2007 due to Mysmane breaking her leg. The album features a number of protest songs, including "No Colours" (anti-nationalism) and "Kill Me" (about the violation of human rights). The song "Your Rain" was featured in an episode of Grey's Anatomy in October 2006. The release tour kicked off again in January 2007.

Dave Chavarri and Mysmane produced the next album, My Own Army, from Principal Studios in Ottmarsbocholt. The album was released on 20 February 2009 after being delayed for nearly a year. The album featured a cover of the Phil Collins song "In the Air Tonight". The songs "Are You Breathing?" and "My Own Army" were dedicated to Mysmane's mother, who died prior to the album's release. The release tour brought them to the United Kingdom for the first time. In June 2009, guitarist Elioalien signed an endorsement deal with American audio equipment manufacturer Peavey Electronics, who furnished him with updated equipment.

A limited-edition version of NAKED, Exilia's fifth album, began recording in January 2010 and featured acoustic versions of "Stop Playing God", "Coincidence", and "Starseed", as well as unedited bonus material and a new song called "No Tears for You". All copies were autographed before being released in April 2010, a month before the standard version. NAKED appeared on the Deutschen Alternative- und Trendcharts' Top 20 at #17 after its release.

Decode, released in March 2012 by ZYX Music, featured Stephan Hinz of H-Blockx on the track "Over the Edge", the music video of which was inspired by short stories by Roald Dahl. "Satellite" is another protest song and "Unconventional" was used by Reebok to promote their winter event in January 2013. Megaherz and Hed PE appeared on the album's release tour. The tour also featured Drowning Pool and Eye Empire on its American leg; this was Exilia's first full tour in the US. Their next album, Purity, was released in 2015.

The singles "Feel the Fire" was released in 2018 and "I AM GOD" in 2019 in preparation for the release of their next album. Due to the COVID-19 pandemic, they rescheduled the album's release for 2022. As of summer 2022, Exilia was traveling for their "Not the End of the World" tour.

== Personnel ==
=== Current ===
- Masha Mysmane – vocals (1998–present)
- Wolve – guitar (??–present)
- Simone Matteo Tiraboschi – bass (2016–present)
- Mark Campailla – drums (2013–present)

=== Former ===
- Frank "Kopo" Coppolino – bass (1998–2001)
- Ramon Rossi – drums (1998–2001)
- Elioalien – guitar (1998–2010)
- Andrea Ge – drums (2000–2005)
- Paolo Morbini – drums (??–2005)
- Random – bass (2003–2007)
- Ale Lera – drums (2005–2010)
- Marco "Privacy" Valerio – bass (2007–2016)
- Mata – bass (2007–??)
- Rob Iaculli – drums (2010–2013)
- Aimer – guitar (2011–2013)
- Carlo Chiarenza – guitar (2013–2016)
- Emanuele Affabile (2016–??)

== Discography ==
=== Albums ===
- Rightside Up (2000)
- Unleashed (24 May 2004)
- Nobody Excluded (21 July 2006)
- My Own Army (20 February 2009)
- NAKED (April 2010 – limited edition; 28 May 2010 – standard)
- Decode (30 March 2012)
- Purity (25 September 2015)
- Heroes and Dust (21 April 2023)

=== Singles/EPs ===
- "Underdog EP" (22 September 2003)
- "Stop Playing God" (22 April 2004)
- "Coincidence" (29 November 2004)
- "Can't Break Me Down" (21 March 2005)
- "Your Rain" (27 October 2006)
- "Kill Me" (2006)
- "Are You Breathing?" (2008)
- "NAKED" (21 May 2010)
- "Feel The Fire" (31 October 2018)
- "I Am God" (8 November 2019)
- Not the End of the World" (12 March 2022)
