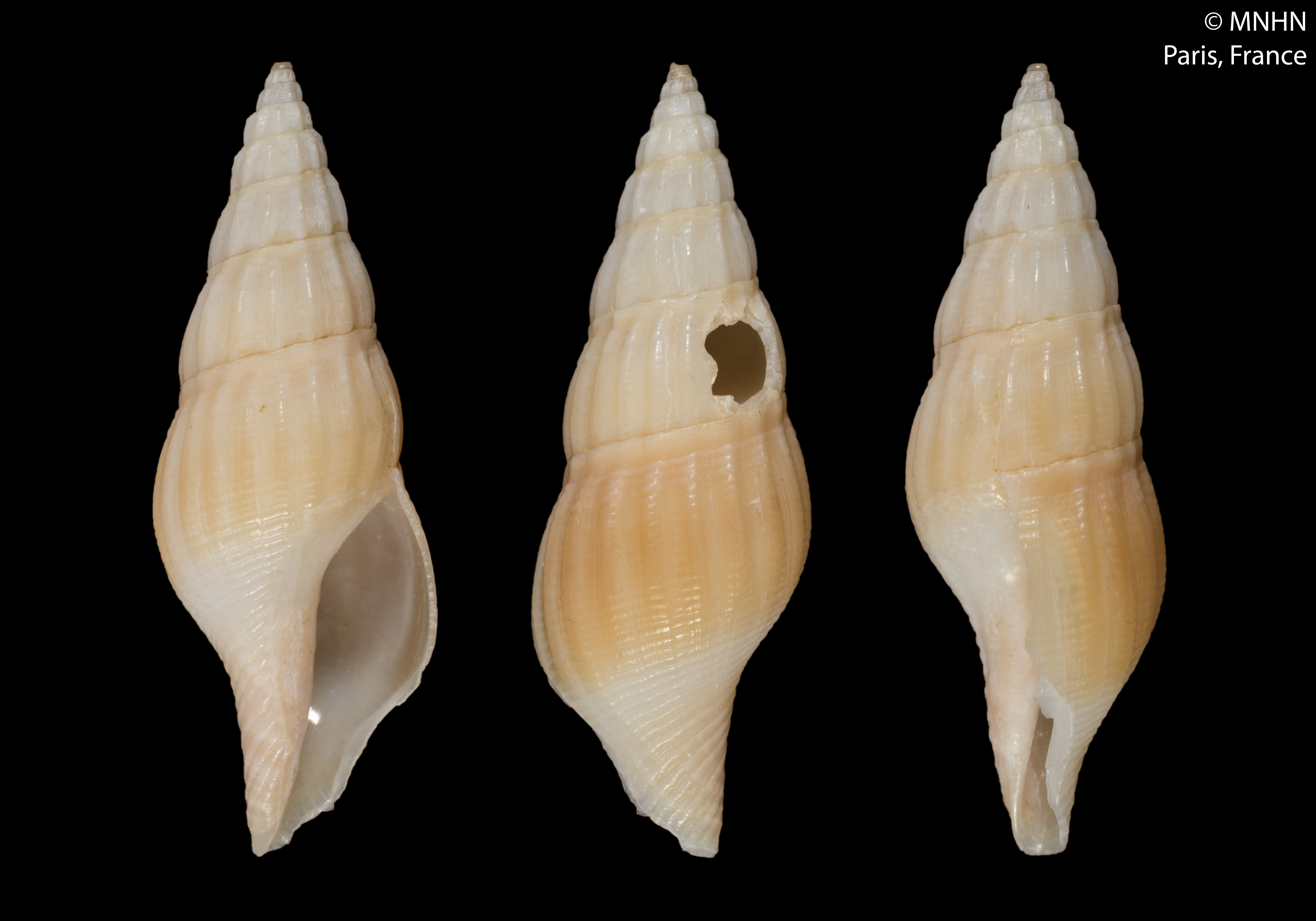
- Shell of Latiromitra cryptodon (syntype at MNHN, Paris)

Scientific classification
- Kingdom: Animalia
- Phylum: Mollusca
- Class: Gastropoda
- Subclass: Caenogastropoda
- Order: Neogastropoda
- Family: Costellariidae
- Genus: Latiromitra
- Species: L. cryptodon

Binomial name
- Latiromitra cryptodon (P. Fischer, 1882)

Synonyms
- Cyomesus chaunax (Bayer, 1971); Latiromitra specialis Locard, 1897; Mitra cryptodon P. Fischer, 1882; Teramachia chaunax Bayer, 1971

= Latiromitra cryptodon =

Species of gastropod

Latiromitra cryptodon is a deep-water marine gastropod in the family Constellariidae, originally described as Mirtra cryptodon by P. Fischer in 1883 and later assigned its current genus placement. Additional synonyms recognized by the World Register of Marine Species include Latiromitra specialis Locard, 1897 and Teramachia chaunax Bayer, 1971 (WoRMS Editorial Board 2024). This species inhabits tropical deep-sea environments and is found at substantial ocean depths typical of many neogastropods. Its classification within Caenogastropoda, Neogastropoda, and the superfamily Turbinelloidea is supported by taxonomic data curated by WoRMS.

L. cryptodon is a non-broadcast spawner. Its lifecycle lacks a trochophore larval stage, which is a developmental pattern consistent with many deep-sea caenogastropods (SeaLifeBase 2024b). Its demersal lifestyle and deep distribution correspond with ecological traits observed in other deep-water neogastropods.

== Description ==
L. cryptodon reaches a maximum recorded shell length of approximately 5.5 cm (SeaLifeBase 2024a). Like other members of its genus, it possesses a high-spired shell typical of deep-sea neogastropods. Further detailed morphological descriptions are available in specialized systematic literature, but large-scale biodiversity databases currently report shell size as the primary measurement for this species.

== Distribution ==
Latiromitra cryptodon is a demersal species occurring across the tropical Atlantic Ocean. Its known latitudinal range spans approximately 24° N to 19° S, and inhabit deep waters at depths of roughly 1,200 - 1,500 meters. This broader distribution indicates that the species is not limited to the waters off Morocco, as earlier accounts suggested, but instead occupies multiple tropical Atlantic regions consistent with deep-sea gastropod biodiversity patterns.

== Works Cited ==
- MEDIN. (2011). UK checklist of marine species derived from the applications Marine Recorder and UNICORN. version 1.0
- MolluscaBase eds. (2025). MolluscaBase. Colus azygosorius Tiba, 1980. Accessed through: World Register of Marine Species at: https://www.marinespecies.org/aphia.php?p=taxdetails&id=490915
- Rosenberg, G. 2009 Malacolog 4.1.1: A Database of Western Atlantic Marine Mollusca. [WWW database (version 4.1.1)] URL http://www.malacolog.org/.
- Sysoev A.V. (2014). Deep-sea fauna of European seas: An annotated species check-list of benthic invertebrates living deeper than 2000 m in the seas bordering Europe. Gastropoda. Invertebrate Zoology. Vol.11. No.1: 134–155
