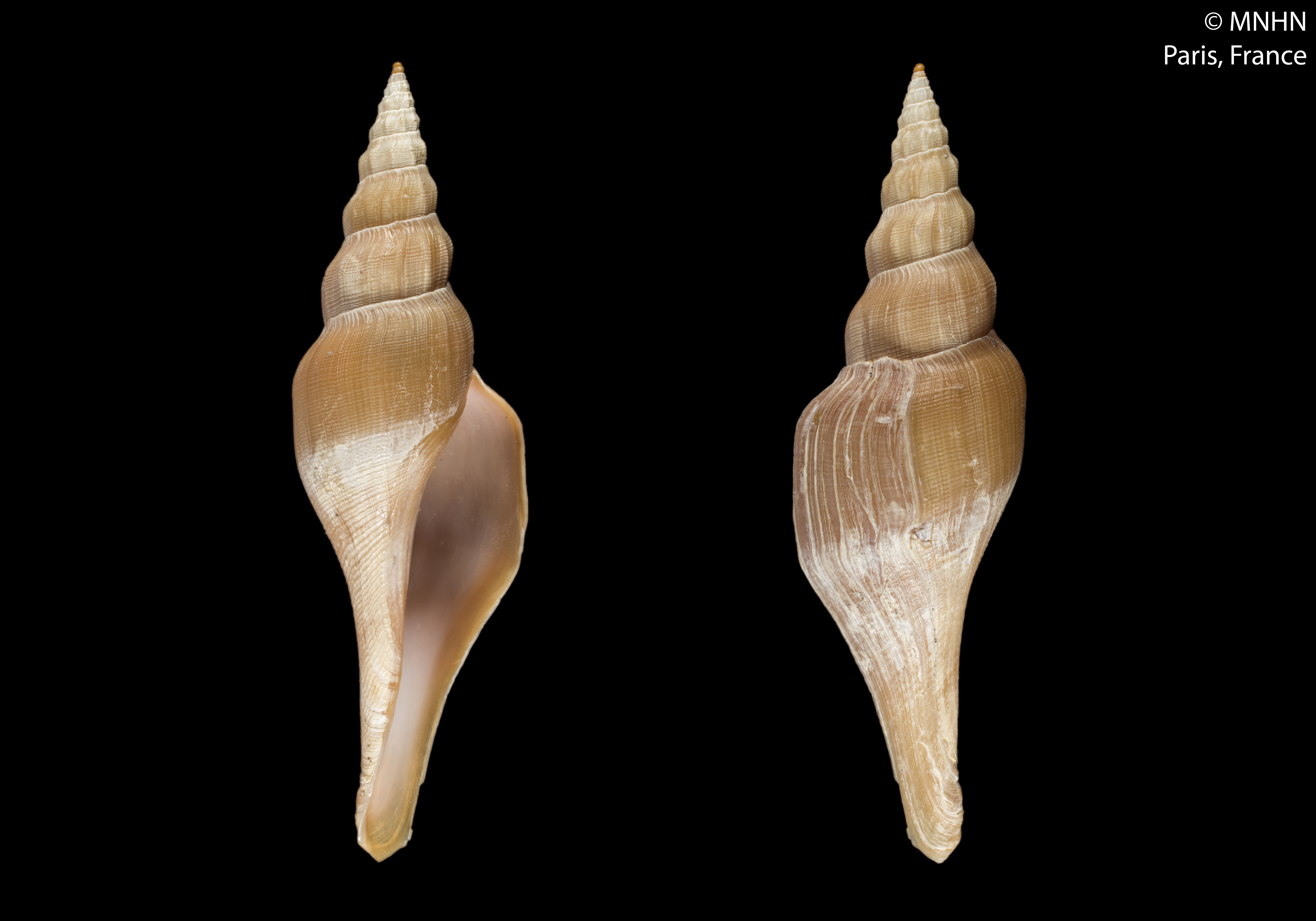
- Exilia vagrans

Scientific classification
- Kingdom: Animalia
- Phylum: Mollusca
- Class: Gastropoda
- Subclass: Caenogastropoda
- Order: Neogastropoda
- Superfamily: Turbinelloidea
- Family: Ptychatractidae; Stimpson, 1865

= Ptychatractidae =

Family of gastropods

Ptychatractidae is a taxonomic family of sea snails, marine gastropod mollusks in the superfamily Turbinelloidea.

== Taxonomy ==
According to the taxonomy of the Gastropoda by Bouchet & Rocroi (2005), the family Ptychatractidae has no subfamilies.

== Genera ==
Genera in the family Ptychatractidae include:

- Egestas Finlay, 1926
- Exilia Conrad, 1860
- Exilioidea Grant & Gale, 1931
- Metzgeria Norman, 1879
- Ptychatractus Stimpson, 1865
- Latiromitra Locard, 1897 - In 2010 Latiromitra has been found to be closely related to Costellariidae in the molecular phylogeny analysis by Fedosov & Kantor (2010).

Genera brought into synonymy

- Benthovoluta Kuroda & Habe, 1950: synonym of Exilia Conrad, 1860
- Chathamidia Dell, 1956: synonym of Exilia Conrad, 1860
- Cyomesus Quinn, 1981: synonym of Latiromitra Locard, 1897
- † Graphidula Stephenson, 1941: synonym of Exilia Conrad, 1860
- Meyeria Dunker & Metzger, 1874: synonym of Metzgeria Norman, 1879
- Mitraefusus Bellardi, 1873: synonym of Exilia Conrad, 1860
- Okinawavoluta Noda, 1980: synonym of Latiromitra Locard, 1897
- † Palaeorhaphis Stewart, 1927 : synonym of Exilia Conrad, 1860
- Phenacoptygma Dall, 1918: synonym of Exilia Conrad, 1860
- Surculina Dall, 1908: synonym of Exilia Conrad, 1860
- † Zexilia Finlay, 1926 : synonym of Exilia Conrad, 1860
