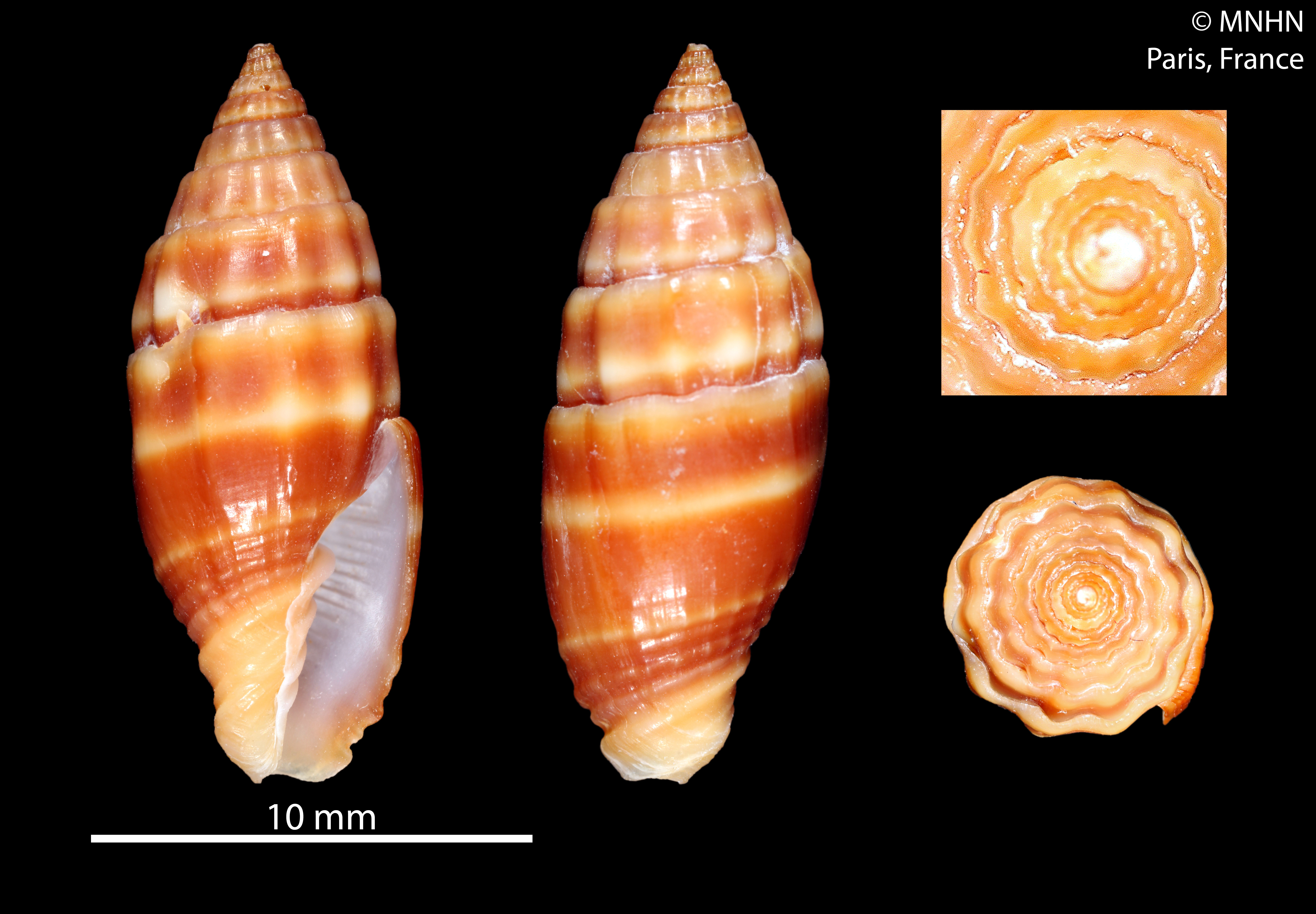
- Shell of Eupusia geronimae (paratype at MNHN, Paris)

Scientific classification
- Kingdom: Animalia
- Phylum: Mollusca
- Class: Gastropoda
- Subclass: Caenogastropoda
- Order: Neogastropoda
- Superfamily: Turbinelloidea
- Family: Costellariidae
- Genus: Eupusia; Fedosov, Bouchet, Dekkers, Gori, S.-I Huang, Kantor, Lemarcis, Marrow, Ratti, Rosenberg, R. Salisbury, Zvonareva & Puillandre, 2025

Type species
- Vexillum geronimae Poppe, Tagaro & R. Salisbury, 2009

= Eupusia =

Genus of gastropods

Eupusia is a genus of small to medium-sized sea snails, marine gastropod molluscs in the family Costellariidae.

The Indo-Pacific species of Pusia (Pusia) have been reassigned in 2025 to the new genus Eupusia.* Fedosov, A.; Bouchet, P.; Dekkers, A.; Gori, S.; Huang, S.-I.; Kantor, Y.; Lemarcis, T.; Marrow, M.; Ratti, C.; Rosenberg, G.; Salisbury, R.; Zvonareva, S.; Puillandre, N. (2025). "The phylogeny and systematics of the Costellariidae (Caenogastropoda: Turbinelloidea) revisited". Invertebrate Systematics. 39 (7): 26. doi:10.1071/is24101. PMID 40608992.

== Species ==
- Eupusia baccheti (R. Salisbury & Herrmann, 2012)
- Eupusia cappuccino Fedosov, Bouchet, Dekkers, Gori, S.-I Huang, Kantor, Lemarcis, Marrow, Ratti, Rosenberg, R. Salisbury, Zvonareva & Puillandre, 2025
- Eupusia clara (S.-I Huang & M. H. Lin, 2020)
- Eupusia depexa (Deshayes, 1833)
- Eupusia emiliae (Schmeltz, 1874)
- Eupusia geronimae (Poppe, Tagaro & R. Salisbury, 2009)
- Eupusia inermis (Reeve, 1845)
- Eupusia klytios (H. Turner, 2008)
- Eupusia lanulenta (S.-I Huang, 2017)
- Eupusia lauta (Reeve, 1845)
- Eupusia pardalis (Küster, 1840)
- Eupusia roris (S.-I Huang & M. H. Lin, 2020)
- Eupusia semicostata (Anton, 1838)
- Eupusia vassardi (Fedosov, Herrmann & Bouchet, 2017)

Synonyms

- Eupusia microzonias (Lamarck, 1811): synonym of Pusia microzonias (Lamarck, 1811) (superseded combination)
