= Eupusia klytios =

Scientific classification
- Kingdom: Animalia
- Phylum: Mollusca
- Class: Gastropoda
- Subclass: Caenogastropoda
- Order: Neogastropoda
- Family: Costellariidae
- Genus: Eupusia
- Species: E. klytios

Binomial name
- Eupusia klytios (Turner, 2008)

Synonyms
- Vexillum (Pusia) klytios Turner, 2008; Vexillum klytios H. Turner, 2008 superseded combination

Species of gastropod

Eupusia klytios is a species of small sea snail, marine gastropod mollusk in the family Costellariidae, the ribbed miters.

== Etymology ==
The word klytios refers to the name Clytius, a brother of Priamos, king of Troy. It was chosen to mean that the species is like a brother of the species Pusia microzonias.

== Description ==
The length of the shell attains 18 millimetres (0.71 in).

== Distribution ==
This marine species occurs in shallow waters the Indo-West Pacific; also off Australia (Northern Territory, Queensland, Western Australia), typically at depths of 20 metres (66 ft).
