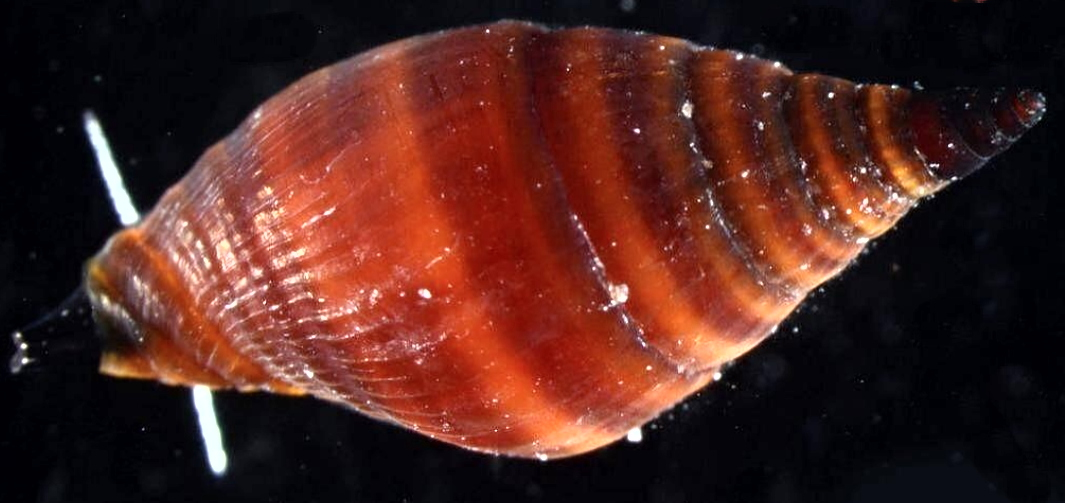
- Eupusia emiliae (specimen at the Smithsonian Institution)

Scientific classification
- Kingdom: Animalia
- Phylum: Mollusca
- Class: Gastropoda
- Subclass: Caenogastropoda
- Order: Neogastropoda
- Family: Costellariidae
- Genus: Eupusia
- Species: E. emiliae

Binomial name
- Eupusia emiliae (Schmeltz, 1874)

Synonyms
- Turricula emiliae Schmeltz, 1874 (original combination); Turricula plicatula Pease, W.H., 1868; Vexillum plicatula Pease, W.H., 1868; Vexillum (Costellaria) emiliae (Schmeltz, 1874); Vexillum (Pusia) emiliae (Schmeltz, 1874); Vexillum emiliae (Schmeltz, 1874) superseded combination

= Eupusia emiliae =

Species of gastropod

Eupusia emiliae is a species of small sea snail, marine gastropod mollusk in the family Costellariidae, the ribbed miters.

== Description ==
The length of the shell varies between 10 mm and 12.5 mm.

(Described as Turricula plicatula) The fusiform shell is attenuated at both ends, longitudinally irregularly plicately ribbed. The ribs becomie obsolete on back of the body whorl. They are transversely very finely striate. The shell is contracted and recurved at its base. The base is encircled by granulose ribs. The columella is four-plaited. The shell is reddish-chestnut, encircled by two or three yellowish bands.

== Distribution ==
This marine species occurs off Hawaii, the Tuamotus and the Philippines.
