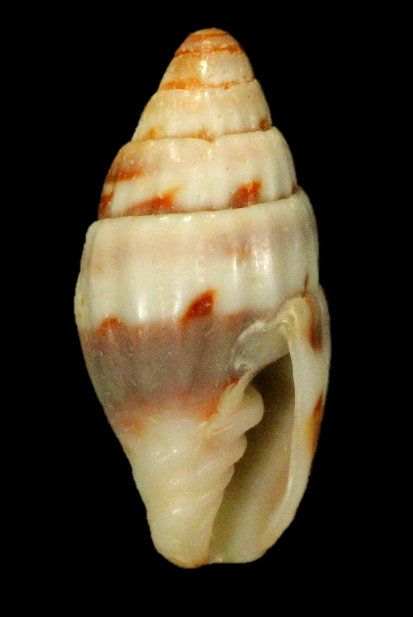
- Shell of Eupusia depexa (specimen at Naturalis Biodiversity Center)

Scientific classification
- Kingdom: Animalia
- Phylum: Mollusca
- Class: Gastropoda
- Subclass: Caenogastropoda
- Order: Neogastropoda
- Superfamily: Turbinelloidea
- Family: Costellariidae
- Genus: Eupusia
- Species: E. depexa

Binomial name
- Eupusia depexa (Deshayes, 1834)

Synonyms
- Mitra depexa Deshayes, 1833 (original combination); Vexillum (Pusia) depexum (Deshayes, 1833) ·; Vexillum depexum (Deshayes, 1833) superseded combination

= Eupusia depexa =

Species of gastropod

Eupusia depexa is a species of small sea snail, marine gastropod mollusk in the family Costellariidae, the ribbed miters.

== Distribution ==
This species occurs in the Red Sea.
