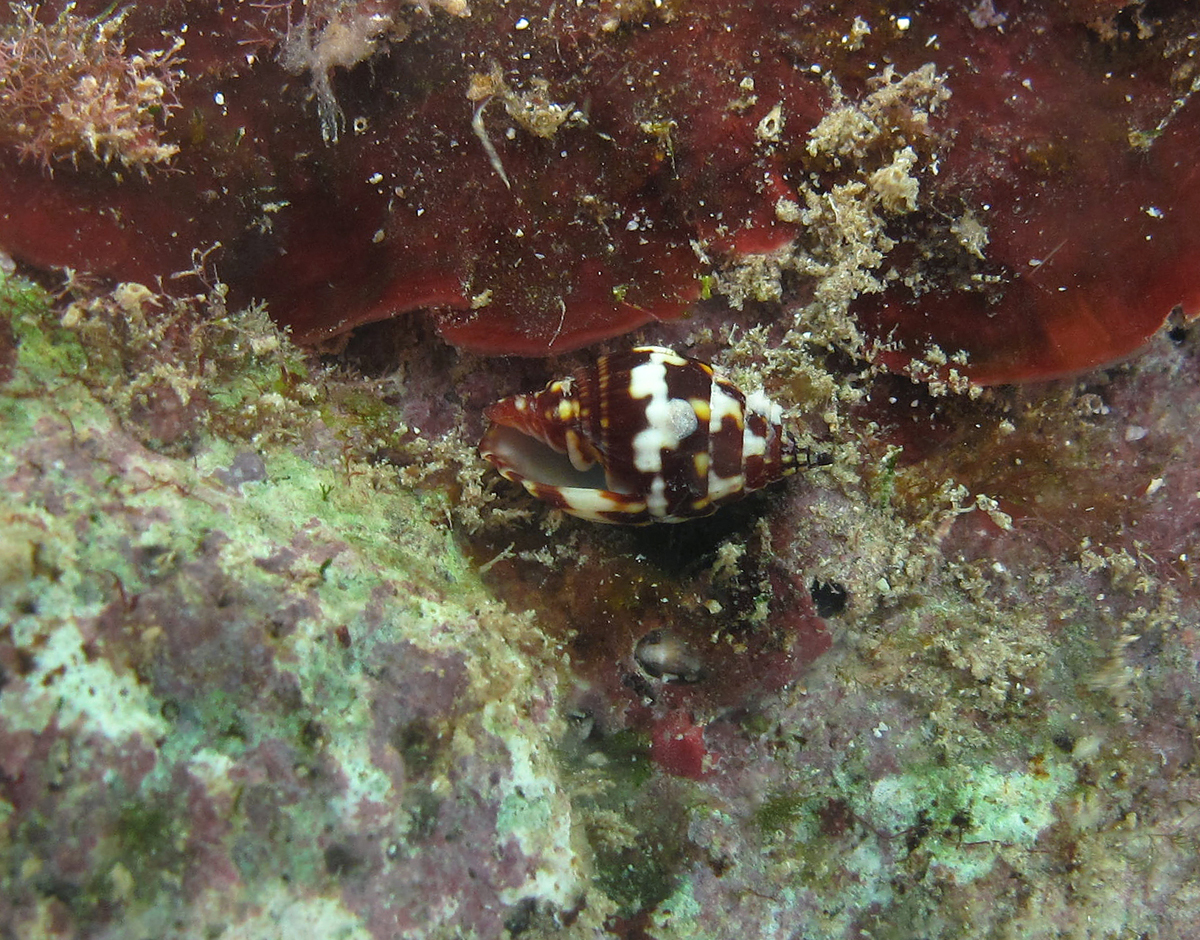
- Eupusia pardalis

Scientific classification
- Kingdom: Animalia
- Phylum: Mollusca
- Class: Gastropoda
- Subclass: Caenogastropoda
- Order: Neogastropoda
- Superfamily: Turbinelloidea
- Family: Costellariidae
- Genus: Eupusia
- Species: E. pardalis

Binomial name
- Eupusia pardalis (Küster, 1840)

Synonyms
- Mitra pardalis Küster, 1840; Mitra russa A. A. Gould, 1860 junior subjective synonym; Pusia pardalis (Küster, 1840); Pusia russa (H.C. Küster, 1840); Vexillum (Pusia) pardale (Küster, 1840); Vexillum pardale (Küster, 1840) superseded combination

= Eupusia pardalis =

Species of gastropod

Eupusia pardalis is a species of sea snail, a marine gastropod mollusk in the family Costellariidae, commonly known as the ribbed miters.

== Description ==
The shell length varies between 14 and 20 millimeters.

The shell is yellowish to chocolate-brown, with an interrupted or continuous white band composed of irregular spots. The tops of the longitudinal ribs are lighter in color, sometimes white.

== Distribution ==
This species occurs in the Red Sea, in the Indian Ocean off South Africa, Mozambique, Mauritius, the Aldabra Atoll, and the Mascarene Basin, and in the Western Pacific Ocean, excluding Hawaii, and has been recorded off the coasts of the Philippines, Papua New Guinea and Australia (Northern Territory, Queensland).
