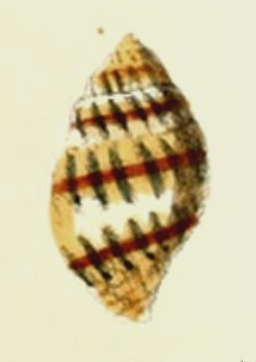
- Original image of Eupusia lauta
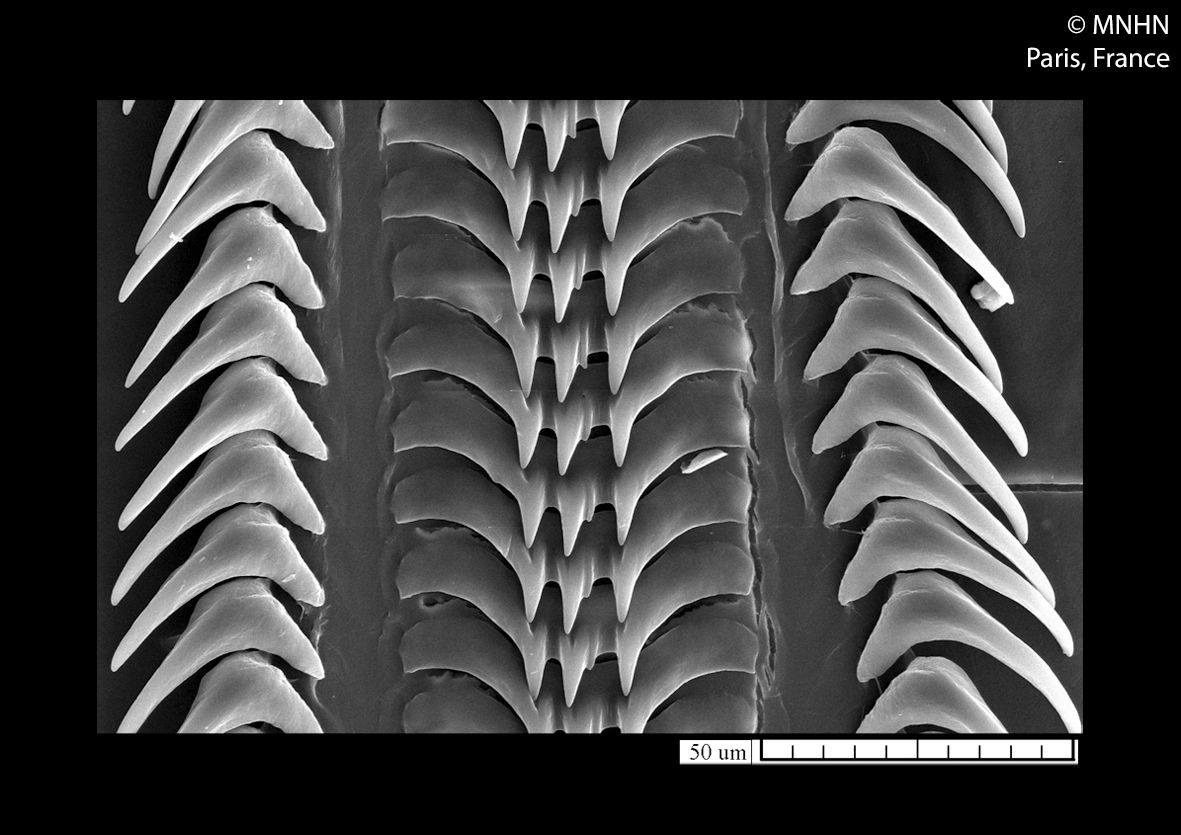
- Radula of Eupusia lauta (specimen at MNHN, Paris)

Scientific classification
- Kingdom: Animalia
- Phylum: Mollusca
- Class: Gastropoda
- Subclass: Caenogastropoda
- Order: Neogastropoda
- Superfamily: Turbinelloidea
- Family: Costellariidae
- Genus: Eupusia
- Species: E. lauta

Binomial name
- Eupusia lauta (Reeve, 1845)

Synonyms
- Mitra lauta Reeve, 1845; Pusia (Pusia) lauta (Reeve, 1845); Pusia lauta (Reeve, 1845) superseded combination; Vexillum (Pusia) lautum (Reeve, 1845); Vexillum lautum (Reeve, 1845)

= Eupusia lauta =

Species of gastropod

Eupusia lauta, common name the gaily mainted mitre, is a species of sea snail, a marine gastropod mollusk, in the family Costellariidae, the ribbed miters.

== Description ==
(Original description) The shell is stoutly ovate and rather solid, with a spire that is obtusely rounded. Its surface is marked by somewhat obsolete longitudinal plicate ribs; the ribs themselves are smooth, while the spaces between them are distinctly impressed with striations. The ribs are orange-red in color, whereas the interstices are dark black, and the middle portion of the whorls is white. The columella bears four folds.

== Distribution ==
This marine species occurs off Papua New Guinea.
