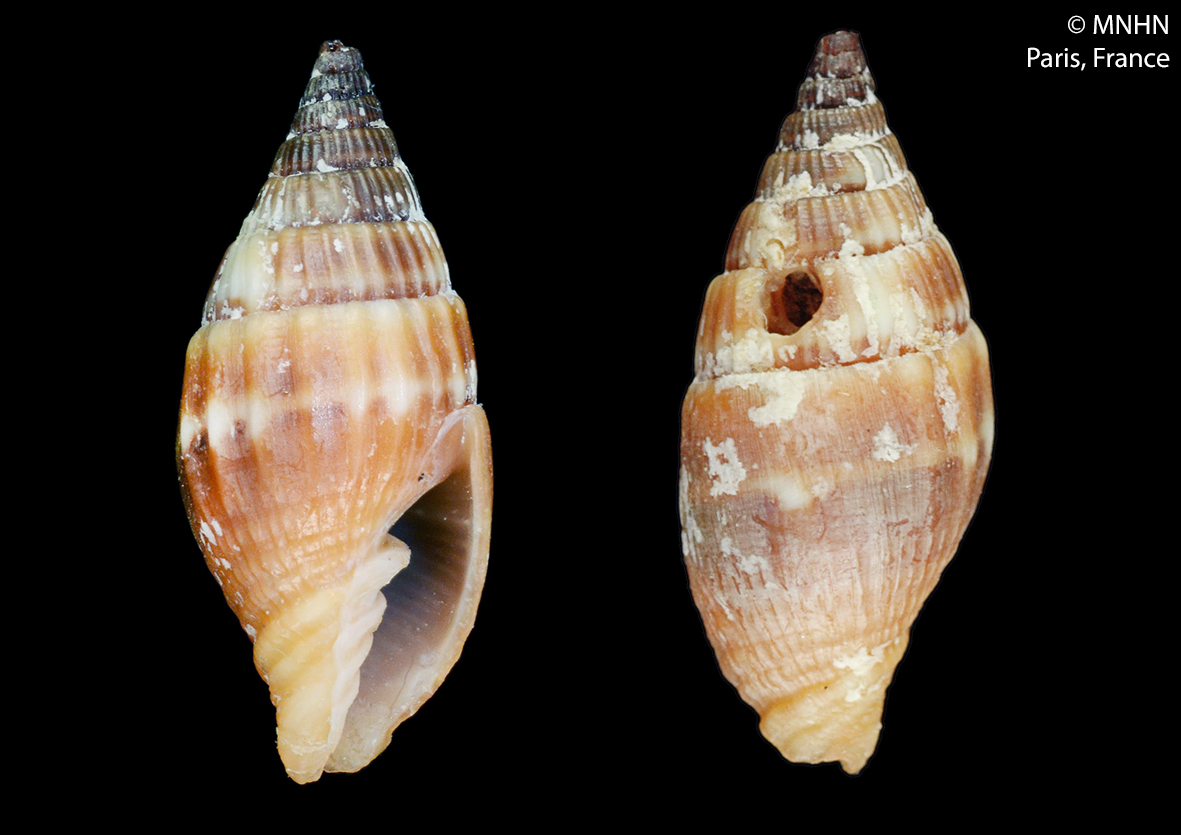
- Shell of Eupusia vassardi (holotype at MNHN, Paris)

Scientific classification
- Kingdom: Animalia
- Phylum: Mollusca
- Class: Gastropoda
- Subclass: Caenogastropoda
- Order: Neogastropoda
- Family: Costellariidae
- Genus: Eupusia
- Species: E. vassardi

Binomial name
- Eupusia vassardi (Fedosov, Herrmann & Bouchet, 2017)

Synonyms
- Pusia (Pusia) vassardi Fedosov, Herrmann & Bouchet, 2017; Pusia vassardi Fedosov, Herrmann & Bouchet, 2017

= Eupusia vassardi =

Species of gastropod

Eupusia vassardi (originally described as Pusia vassardi) is a species of small marine gastropod mollusk in the family Costellariidae, the ribbed miters.

== Description ==
The shell of the holotype measures 14.6 mm in length. It is fusiform with a moderately high spire and strong axial ribs, characteristic of the genus. The radula and shell morphology were studied in detail in the original description.

== Distribution ==
This species is known only from the type locality off Madagascar (Indian Ocean).

== Habitat ==
It lives in the marine benthic zone (deep-water environment).

== Taxonomy ==
The species was originally placed in the genus Pusia when described in 2017. In subsequent revisions of the family Costellariidae, it was transferred to the genus Eupusia. The currently accepted name (as of 2026) is Eupusia vassardi.
