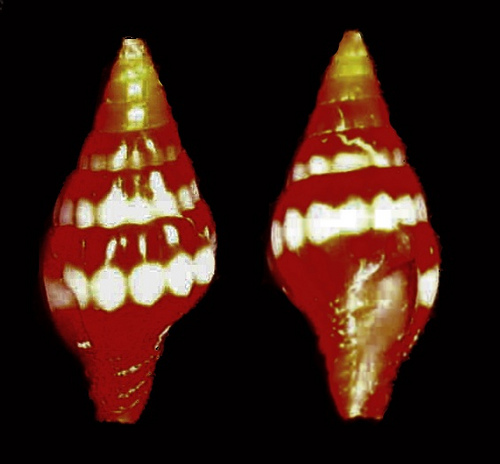
- Eupusia semicostata

Scientific classification
- Kingdom: Animalia
- Phylum: Mollusca
- Class: Gastropoda
- Subclass: Caenogastropoda
- Order: Neogastropoda
- Family: Costellariidae
- Genus: Eupusia
- Species: E. semicostata

Binomial name
- Eupusia semicostata (Anton, 1838)

Synonyms
- Mitra semicostata Anton, 1838; Pusia semicostata (Anton, 1838); Pusia semicostatum (Anton, 1838); Vexillum (Pusia) semicostatum (Anton, 1838) ·; Vexillum semicostatum (Anton, 1838) superseded combination

= Eupusia semicostata =

Species of gastropod

Eupusia semicostata, common name the half-ribbed mitre, is a species of small sea snail, marine gastropod mollusk in the family Costellariidae, the ribbed miters.

== Description ==
The shell size varies between 10 mm and 22 mm.

The shell is ovate. The whorls of the spire are obtusely plicately ribbed. The body whorl is smooth. The shell is chestnut-brown, the spire partially white. The columella is four-plaited.

== Distribution ==
This species occurs in the Red Sea, the Indian Ocean off the Mascarene Basin, Madagascar and in the Pacific Ocean off Queensland, Australia and Papua New Guinea.
