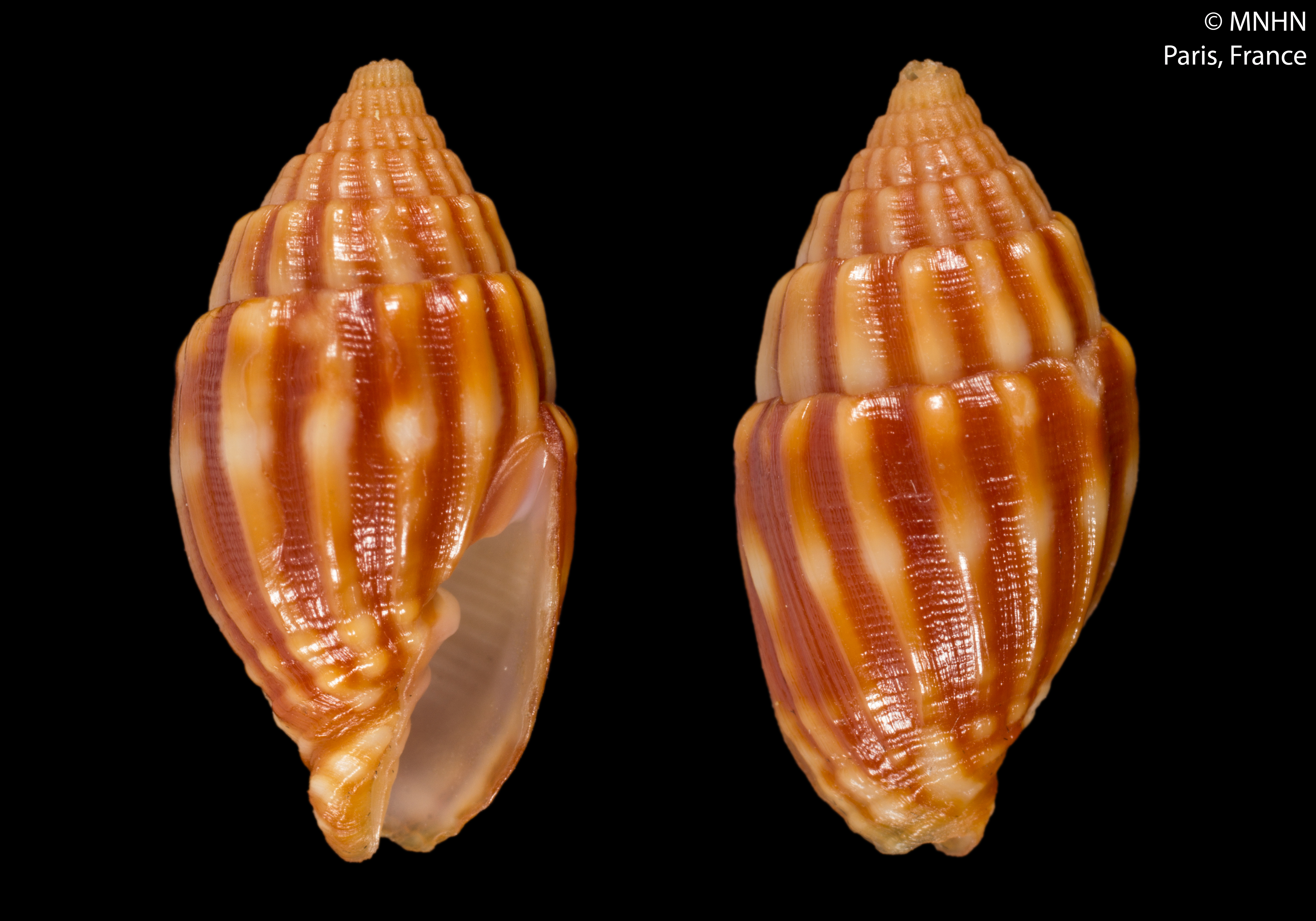
- Shell of Eupusia baccheti (holotype at MNHN, Paris)

Scientific classification
- Kingdom: Animalia
- Phylum: Mollusca
- Class: Gastropoda
- Subclass: Caenogastropoda
- Order: Neogastropoda
- Superfamily: Turbinelloidea
- Family: Costellariidae
- Genus: Eupusia
- Species: E. baccheti

Binomial name
- Eupusia baccheti (Salisbury & Herrmann, 2012)

Synonyms
- Vexillum (Pusia) baccheti Salisbury & Herrmann, 2012; Vexillum baccheti R. Salisbury & Herrmann, 2012 superseded combination

= Eupusia baccheti =

Species of gastropod

Eupusia baccheti is a species of sea snail, a marine gastropod mollusk, in the family Costellariidae, the ribbed miters.

== Description ==
The length of the shell attains 13.1 mm.

== Distribution ==
This marine species occurs off Tahiti.
