= Eupusia roris =

Scientific classification
- Kingdom: Animalia
- Phylum: Mollusca
- Class: Gastropoda
- Subclass: Caenogastropoda
- Order: Neogastropoda
- Family: Costellariidae
- Genus: Eupusia
- Species: E. roris

Binomial name
- Eupusia roris (S.-I Huang & M.-H. Lin, 2020)

Species of gastropod

Eupusia roris is a species of small sea snail, marine gastropod mollusk in the family Costellariidae, the ribbed miters.

== Distribution ==
This marine species occurs off the Philippines.
