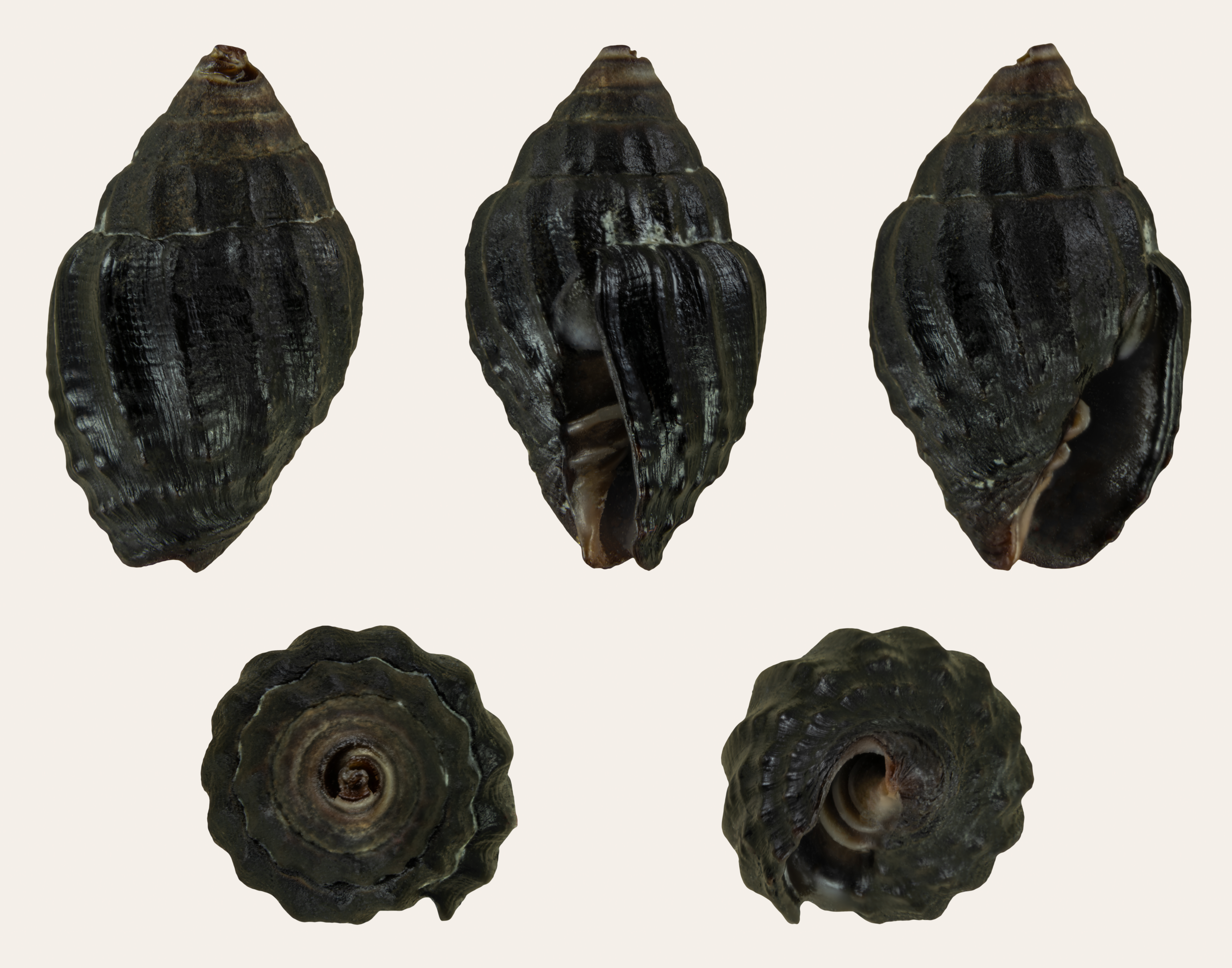

Scientific classification
- Kingdom: Animalia
- Phylum: Mollusca
- Class: Gastropoda
- Subclass: Caenogastropoda
- Order: Neogastropoda
- Superfamily: Turbinelloidea
- Family: Costellariidae
- Genus: Eupusia
- Species: E. lanulenta

Binomial name
- Eupusia lanulenta (S.-I Huang, 2017)

= Eupusia lanulenta =

Species of gastropod

Eupusia lanulenta is a species of sea snail, a marine gastropod mollusk, in the family Costellariidae, the ribbed miters.

== Description ==
The length of the shell is 9.5 to 14 mm.

== Distribution ==
This species occurs of the coast of the Philippines and Taiwan.
