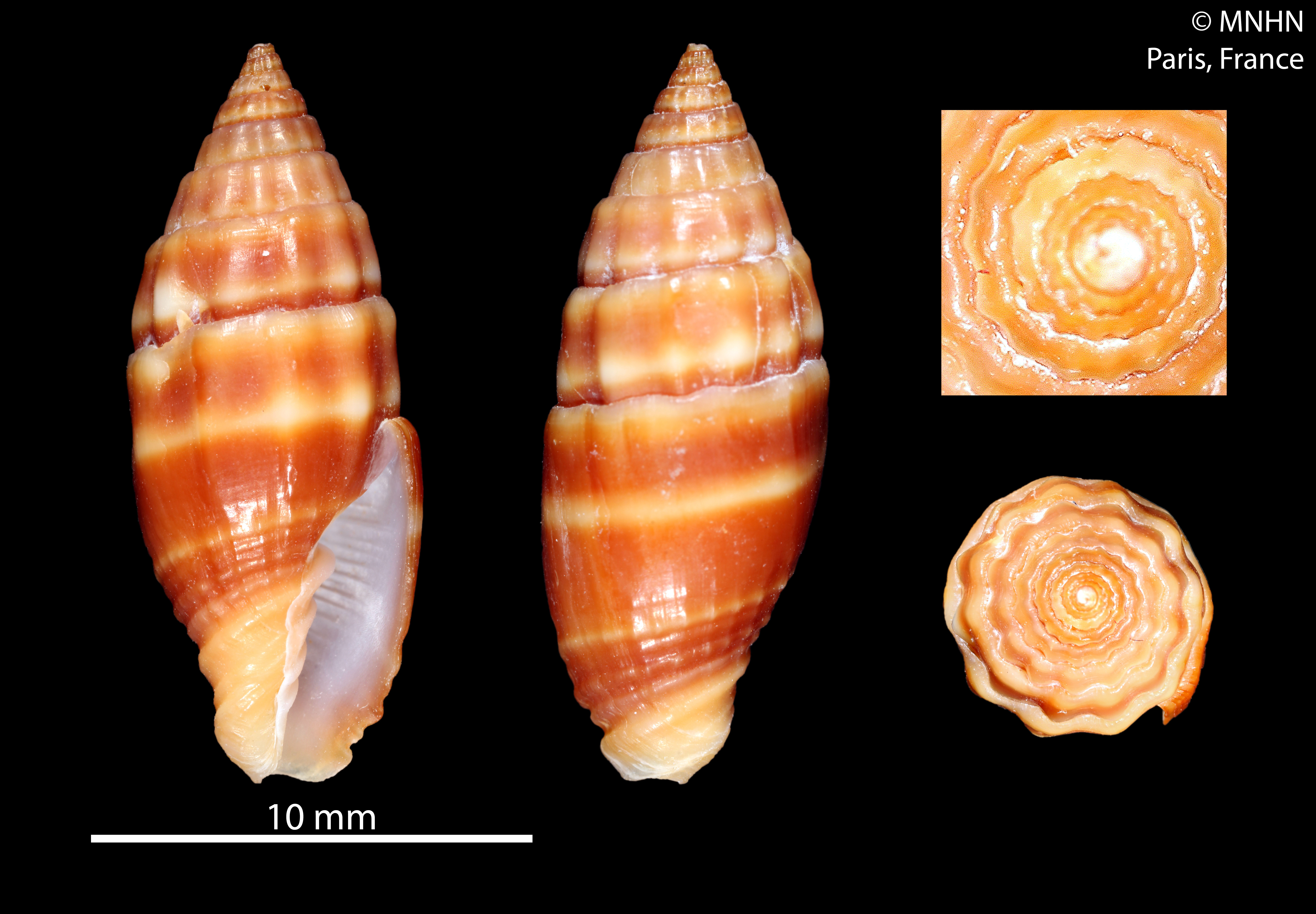
- Shell of Eupusia geronimae (paratype at MNHN, Paris)

Scientific classification
- Kingdom: Animalia
- Phylum: Mollusca
- Class: Gastropoda
- Subclass: Caenogastropoda
- Order: Neogastropoda
- Superfamily: Turbinelloidea
- Family: Costellariidae
- Genus: Eupusia
- Species: E. geronimae

Binomial name
- Eupusia geronimae (Poppe, Tagaro & Salisbury, 2009)

Synonyms
- Vexillum geronimae Poppe, Tagaro & R. Salisbury, 2009 superseded combination

= Eupusia geronimae =

Species of gastropod

Eupusia geronimae is a species of small sea snail, marine gastropod mollusk in the family Costellariidae, the ribbed miters.

== Description ==
The length of the shell attains 17.4 mm.

Its functional type is Benthos.

Its feeding type is predatory.

== Distribution ==
This marine species occurs off the Philippines.
