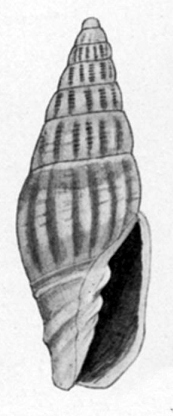
- Shell of Eupusia inermis

Scientific classification
- Kingdom: Animalia
- Phylum: Mollusca
- Class: Gastropoda
- Subclass: Caenogastropoda
- Order: Neogastropoda
- Superfamily: Turbinelloidea
- Family: Costellariidae
- Genus: Eupusia
- Species: E. inermis

Binomial name
- Eupusia inermis (Reeve, 1845)

Synonyms
- Mitra inermis Reeve, 1845 (original combination); Mitra (Costellaria) hizenensis H.A. Pilsbry, 1901; Pusia inerme (L.A. Reeve, 1845); Pusia kraussi R.W. Dunker, 1861; Vexillum hizenensis (H.A. Pilsbry, 1901); Vexillum vanattai H.A. Pilsbry, 1901; Vexillum (Pusia) inerme (Reeve, 1845); Vexillum inerme (Reeve, 1845) superseded combination

= Eupusia inermis =

Species of gastropod

Eupusia inermis is a species of small sea snail, marine gastropod mollusk in the family Costellariidae, the ribbed miters.

== Description ==
The length of the shell attains 28 mm.

(Original description) The oblong shell is ovate. It is longitudinally very closely plicated and grooved at the base. The shell is reddish brown, encircled with a whitish band crossed with fine brown zigzag lines. The columella is four-plaited.

(Described as Mitra (Costellaria) hizenensis) The slender shell is solid. It is dusky olive, with a brown or orange-brown and rather prominent subsutural line and an ill-defined white zone at the shoulder, in which the summits of the ribs are transversely marked with short scattered brown lines. The narrow portion of the base is pale yellow, with brown spots and dots. The surface is rather glossy. It is sculptured with rounded longitudinal ribs, nearly or quite as wide as their intervals, 13 or 14 in number on the penultimate whorl, becoming gradually weaker below the periphery of the body whorl, and in adults obsolete toward the aperture. The concave intervals crossed by very low, flat spirals, rather wider than the shallow, oblong pits between them, and about 6 in number on the penultimate whorl. The body whorl is attenuated below, and has a number of large spiral ribs and small cords and striae, the largest rib continuous with the upper columellar plait. The shell contains about 9 whorls. The apex is dark. The aperture is small and dark purple-brown within. The outer lip is thin, white-bordered, muitilirate inside. The columella has four simple plaits.

== Distribution ==
This marine species occurs off Okinawa and Japan.
