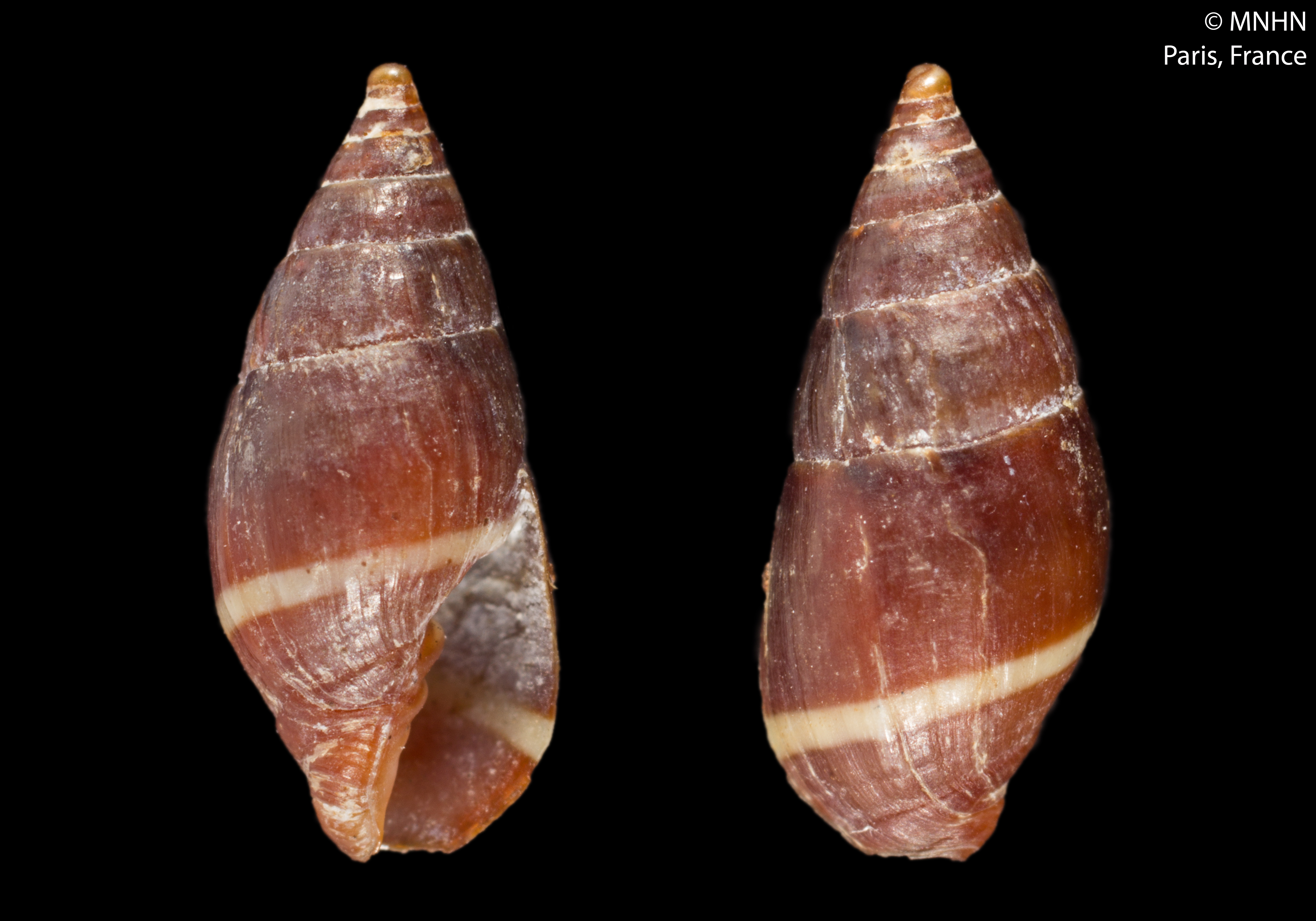
- Shell of Pusia microzonias (specimen at MNHN, Paris)

Scientific classification
- Kingdom: Animalia
- Phylum: Mollusca
- Class: Gastropoda
- Subclass: Caenogastropoda
- Order: Neogastropoda
- Superfamily: Turbinelloidea
- Family: Costellariidae
- Genus: Pusia
- Species: P. microzonias

Binomial name
- Pusia microzonias (Lamarck, 1811)

Synonyms
- Eupusia microzonias (Lamarck, 1811); Mitra infrafasciata Souverbie, 1865 ·; Mitra glabra Pease, 1868 junior homonym (non Mitra glabra Swainson, 1821); Mitra microzonias Lamarck, 1811; Pusia (Pusia) microzonias (Lamarck, 1811); Vexillum (Pusia) microzonias (Lamarck, 1811); Vexillum microzonias (Lamarck, 1811)

= Pusia microzonias =

Species of gastropod

Pusia microzonias is a species of sea snail, a marine gastropod mollusk, in the family Costellariidae, the ribbed miters.

== Description ==
The length of the shell attains 9.3 mm, its diameter 4.1 mm.

(Described as Mitra microzonias) The shell shows a row of white spots so arranged as to come one on each rib, forming a chain on the centre of the body whorl.

(Described as Mitra glabra) The shell is oblong-ovate in shape, notably thick, and possesses a smooth, polished surface. It is longitudinally ribbed; these ribs are rounded in form, though they become obsolete on the body whorl. The columella is equipped with four distinct folds.

The shell is a ashy-brown, while the lower portion of the body whorl transitions into a chestnut-brown. Furthermore, the shell is encircled by a single, narrow, yellowish band.

== Distribution ==
This marine species occurs off Fiji, Ascension Island and in many other parts of the western Pacific, from Indonesia to the Marshall Islands.
