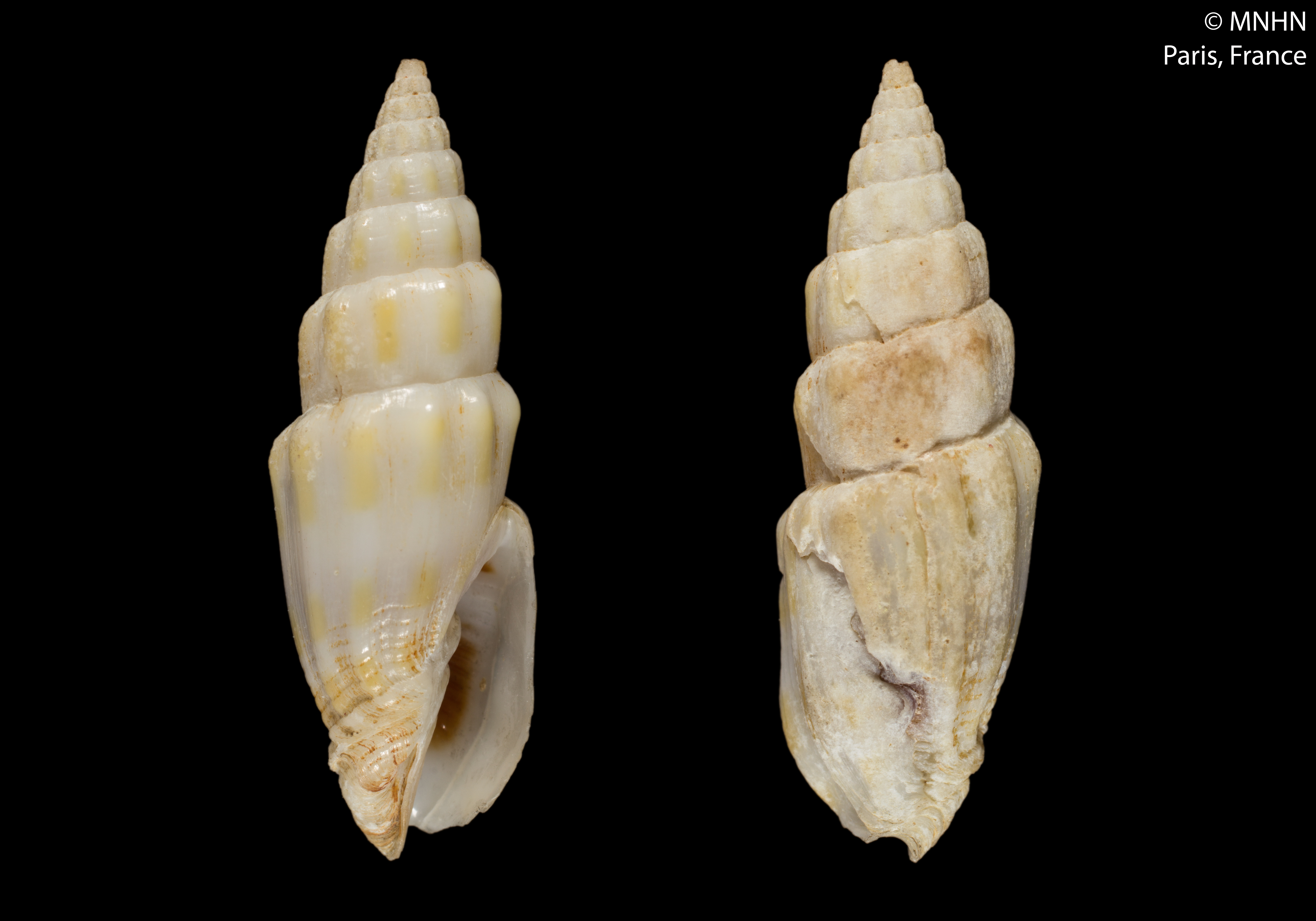
- Shell of syntype at MNHN, Paris

Scientific classification
- Kingdom: Animalia
- Phylum: Mollusca
- Class: Gastropoda
- Subclass: Caenogastropoda
- Order: Neogastropoda
- Superfamily: Turbinelloidea
- Family: Costellariidae
- Genus: Vexillum
- Species: V. deshayesii

Binomial name
- Vexillum deshayesii (Reeve, 1845)

Synonyms
- Mitra rigida Swainson, W.A., 1840; Mitra deshayesi Reeve, 1844; Mitra elegantula Dunker, R.W., 1871; Mitra articulata "Philippi, R.A." Jickeli, 1874; Mitra festiva Garrett, A., 1880; Mitra formosa Garrett, A., 1880; Vexillum (Costellaria) deshayesi (Reeve, 1844) (misspelling)

= Vexillum deshayesii =

Species of gastropod

Vexillum deshayesii is a species of small sea snail, marine gastropod mollusk in the family Costellariidae, the ribbed miters.

The subspecies : Vexillum deshayesi alauda (Sowerby II, 1874) has become a synonym of Vexillum (Costellaria) michaui (Crosse & P. Fischer, 1864).

== Description ==
The shell size varies between 10 mm and 30 mm.

== Distribution ==
This species occurs in the Red Sea, in the Indian Ocean off Chagos, the Mascarene Basin, Madagascar, Mauritius and Mozambique through Indonesia to Tonga and Samoa in southern Polynesia.

Fossils were found in late Miocene strata in Eniwetok. The species is not known to be living in the Marshall Islands today.
