= Vexillum bancalanense =

Scientific classification
- Kingdom: Animalia
- Phylum: Mollusca
- Class: Gastropoda
- Subclass: Caenogastropoda
- Order: Neogastropoda
- Superfamily: Turbinelloidea
- Family: Costellariidae
- Genus: Vexillum
- Species: V. bancalanense

Binomial name
- Vexillum bancalanense (Bartsch, 1918)

Synonyms
- Pusia bancalanensis P. Bartsch, 1918; Turricula bancalanensis Bartsch, 1918 (original combination); Vexillum festum bancalanensis (P. Bartsch, 1918); Vexillum (Pusia) bancalanense (Bartsch, 1918)

Species of gastropod

Vexillum bancalanense is a species of sea snail, a marine gastropod mollusk, in the family Costellariidae, the ribbed miters.

== Description ==
The length of the shell attains 10.6 mm; its diameter 4 mm.

(Original description) The small shell is elongate ovate. The spire is flesh-colored except for the narrow dark zone on the suture. In the body whorl the posterior half of the whorl is encircled by a light-brown band, the rest of the shell being flesh-colored. The protoconch consists of 1½ whorls, strongly rounded, and smooth, forming a somewhat mamillated apex. The whorls of the teleoconch are roundly shouldered at the summit, well rounded, marked by strong, broad, slightly protractive axial ribs, of which sixteen occur upon the first to fifth, fourteen upon the sixth, and twelve upon the penultimate whorl. These ribs become slightly enfeebled at the summit, and evanescent on reaching the anterior half of the base. In addition to the axial ribs, the entire surface of the shell is marked by very fine lines of growth. The spaces between the ribs are a little wider than the ribs and are crossed by three incised pits between the summit and the suture, the space between the summit and the first being the widest, while that between the first and second equals the space between the suture and the third in width, the space between the second and third being a little wider than the last named. The suture is strongly marked. The base of the shell is rather prolonged, slightly concave at the insertion of the columella, and the posterior third is marked by six incised spiral lines, which are less regularly spaced than those on the spire. The anterior two-thirds of the base is marked by eight irregular, broad, low, rounded spiral cords. The aperture is irregularly elongate oval, posterior angle acute, and decidedly channeled anteriorly. The outer lip is thin and somewhat sinuous. The inner lip is provided with four oblique folds, of which the posterior is the strongest, the others becoming successively weaker. The parietal wall is covered by a thin callus anteriorly and a much thicker one at the posterior angle of the aperture.

== Distribution ==
This marine species occurs off the Philippines.
