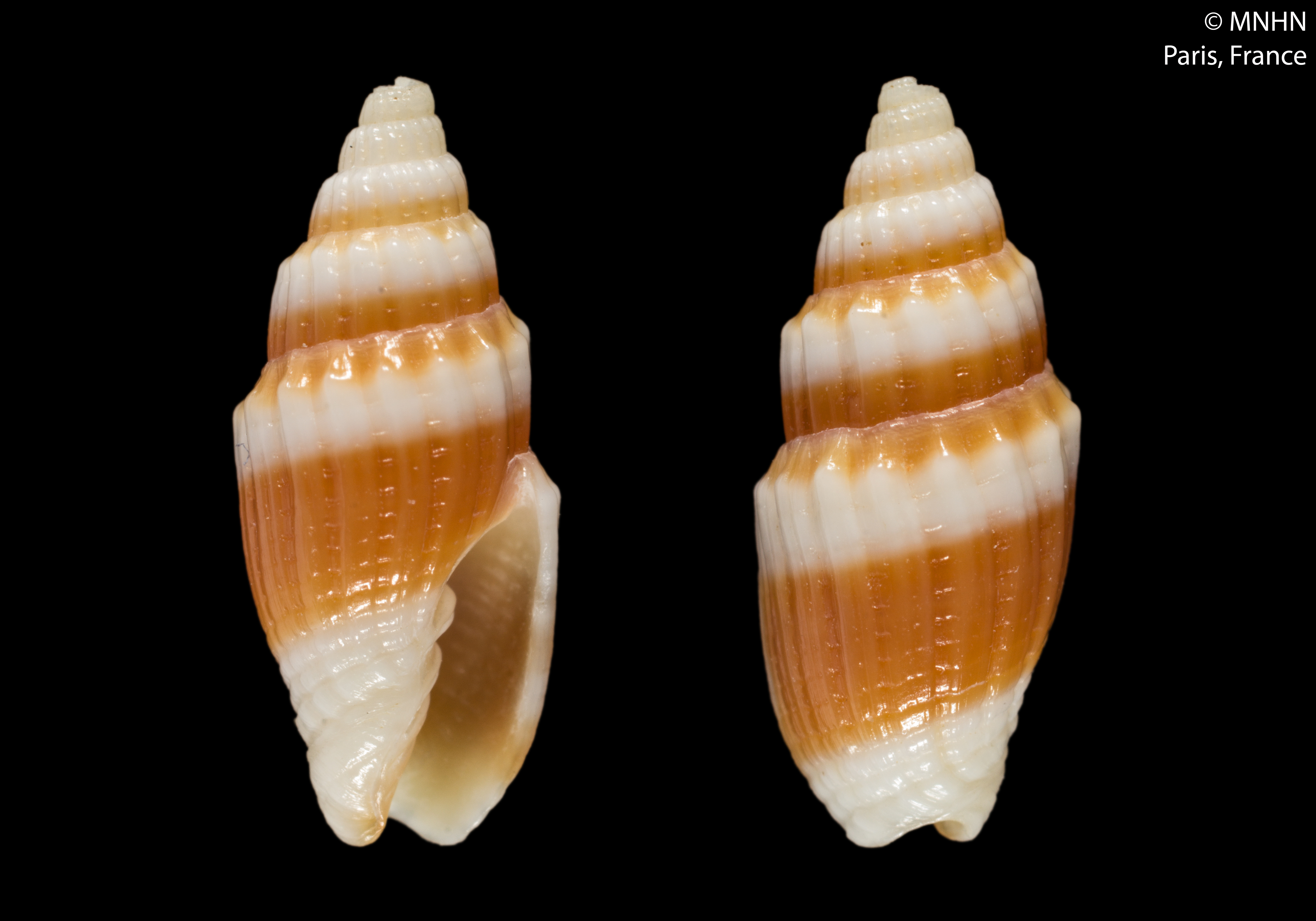
- Shell of Vexillum turriger (lectotype at MNHN, Paris)

Scientific classification
- Kingdom: Animalia
- Phylum: Mollusca
- Class: Gastropoda
- Subclass: Caenogastropoda
- Order: Neogastropoda
- Superfamily: Turbinelloidea
- Family: Costellariidae
- Genus: Vexillum
- Species: V. turriger

Binomial name
- Vexillum turriger (Reeve, 1845)

Synonyms
- Mitra armiger Reeve, 1845; Mitra rufobalteata Hervier, 1897; Mitra turriger Reeve, 1845; Vexillum (Costellaria) turriger (Reeve, 1845); Vexillum rufobalteatum (Hervier, 1897); Vexillum turrigerum [sic] (misspelling)

= Vexillum turriger =

Species of gastropod

Vexillum turriger is a species of small sea snail, marine gastropod mollusk in the family Costellariidae, the ribbed miters.

== Description ==
(Original description) The shell is fusiform The spire is angularly turreted. The whorls are angulated at the upper part, longitudinally ribbed. The ribs are narrow, prickly tubercled on the angle, the interstices transversely impressed. The shell is whitish, painted between the ribs with a rather broad brown band. The columella is four-plaited.

== Distribution ==
This marine species occurs in the Indo-West Pacific: off the Philippines, Guam, the Marshall Islands; and off Australia (Northern Territory, Queensland, Western Australia).
