= Vexillum indistinctum =

Scientific classification
- Kingdom: Animalia
- Phylum: Mollusca
- Class: Gastropoda
- Subclass: Caenogastropoda
- Order: Neogastropoda
- Superfamily: Turbinelloidea
- Family: Costellariidae
- Genus: Vexillum
- Species: †V. indistinctum

Binomial name
- †Vexillum indistinctum (K. Martin, 1935)

Synonyms
- † Turricula indistincta K. Martin, 1935

Species of gastropod

Vexillum indistinctum is an extinct species of sea snail, a marine gastropod mollusk, in the family Costellariidae, the ribbed miters.

== Distribution ==
Fossils of this marine species were found in Oligocene strata in Indonesia.
