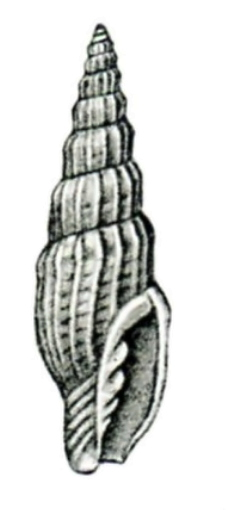
- Drawing of a shell of Vexillum sumatranum (holotype)

Scientific classification
- Kingdom: Animalia
- Phylum: Mollusca
- Class: Gastropoda
- Subclass: Caenogastropoda
- Order: Neogastropoda
- Superfamily: Turbinelloidea
- Family: Costellariidae
- Genus: Vexillum
- Species: V. sumatranum

Binomial name
- Vexillum sumatranum (Thiele, 1925)

Synonyms
- Turricula sumatrana Thiele, 1925 (original combination); Vexillum (Costellaria) sumatranum (Thiele, 1925)

= Vexillum sumatranum =

Species of gastropod

Vexillum sumatranum is a species of small sea snail, marine gastropod mollusk in the family Costellariidae, the ribbed miters.

== Distribution ==
This marine species occurs off Sumatra, Indonesia.
