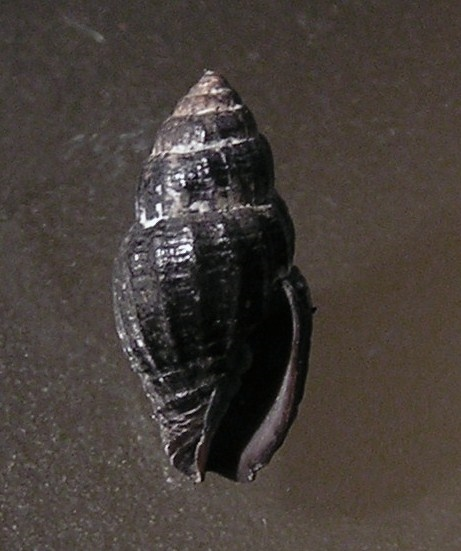

Scientific classification
- Kingdom: Animalia
- Phylum: Mollusca
- Class: Gastropoda
- Subclass: Caenogastropoda
- Order: Neogastropoda
- Superfamily: Turbinelloidea
- Family: Costellariidae
- Genus: Vexillum
- Species: V. ficulinum

Binomial name
- Vexillum ficulinum (Lamarck, 1811)

Synonyms
- Mitra ficulina Lamarck, 1811 (original combination); Mitra forticostata Reeve, L.A. 1845; Vexillum (Pusia) ficulinum (Lamarck, 1811) ·

= Vexillum ficulinum =

Species of gastropod

Vexillum ficulinum is a species of small sea snail, marine gastropod mollusk in the family Costellariidae, the ribbed miters.

== Description ==
The length of the shell attains 20 mm.

This species has an oval shell, more or less shouldered. It is very brown red, sometimes quite black. It is everywhere streaked transversely and provided with obtuse longitudinal ribs, which become distinct towards their base. The aperture is whitish to chocolate. The columella is four-plaited.

== Distribution ==
This species occurs in the Indian Ocean, the Western Pacific and off the Philippines and Australia.

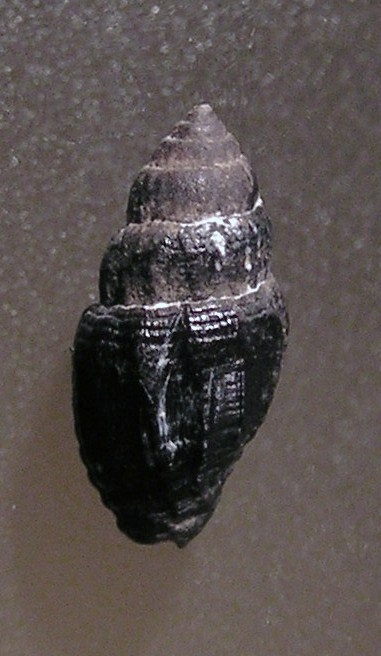
Abapertural view
