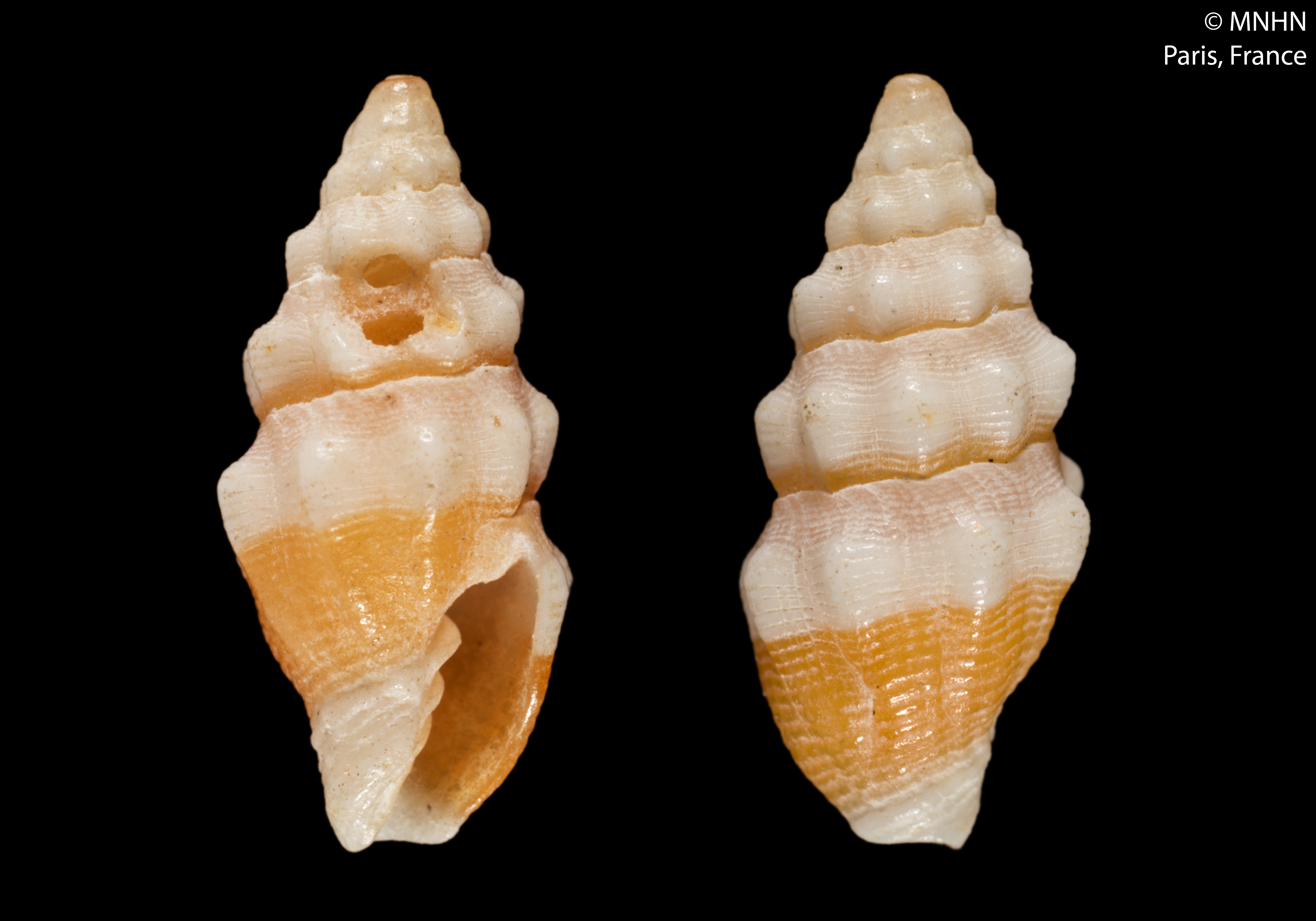
- Shell of Vexillum pagodula (lectotype at MNHN, Paris)

Scientific classification
- Kingdom: Animalia
- Phylum: Mollusca
- Class: Gastropoda
- Subclass: Caenogastropoda
- Order: Neogastropoda
- Superfamily: Turbinelloidea
- Family: Costellariidae
- Genus: Vexillum
- Species: V. pagodula

Binomial name
- Vexillum pagodula (Hervier, 1897)

Synonyms
- Mitra pagodula Hervier, 1897 (original combination); Vexillum (Costellaria) pagodula (Hervier, 1897) ·

= Vexillum pagodula =

Species of gastropod

Vexillum pagodula is a species of small sea snail, marine gastropod mollusk in the family Costellariidae.

== Description ==
The length of the shell is 4.5 mm-12 mm.

== Distribution ==
The shells are usually found off of New Guinea, the Mariana Islands, and Fiji.
