= Vexillum kimiyum =

Scientific classification
- Kingdom: Animalia
- Phylum: Mollusca
- Class: Gastropoda
- Subclass: Caenogastropoda
- Order: Neogastropoda
- Family: Costellariidae
- Genus: Vexillum
- Species: V. kimiyum

Binomial name
- Vexillum kimiyum Turner, 2008

Synonyms
- Vexillum (Costellaria) kimiyum Turner, 2008

Species of gastropod

Vexillum kimiyum is a species of small sea snail, marine gastropod mollusk in the family Costellariidae, the ribbed miters.

== Description ==
The length of the shell attains 15 mm.

== Distribution ==
This marine species occurs off Philippines and Indonesia. It lives in the average depth of 10-20 m, salinity of 30-35 PSU and temperature of 25-30 °C.
