= Vexillum tiro =

Scientific classification
- Kingdom: Animalia
- Phylum: Mollusca
- Class: Gastropoda
- Subclass: Caenogastropoda
- Order: Neogastropoda
- Superfamily: Turbinelloidea
- Family: Costellariidae
- Genus: Vexillum
- Species: V. tiro

Binomial name
- Vexillum tiro S.-I Huang, 2023

Species of gastropod

Vexillum tiro is a species of small sea snail, marine gastropod mollusk in the family Costellariidae, the ribbed miters.

== Distribution ==
This marine species occurs off the Philippines.
