= Vexillum honestum =

Scientific classification
- Kingdom: Animalia
- Phylum: Mollusca
- Class: Gastropoda
- Subclass: Caenogastropoda
- Order: Neogastropoda
- Superfamily: Turbinelloidea
- Family: Costellariidae
- Genus: Vexillum
- Species: V. honestum

Binomial name
- Vexillum honestum (Melvill & Standen, 1895)

Synonyms
- Mitra (Volutomitra) honesta Melvill & Standen, 1895 superseded combination; Mitra honesta Melvill & Standen, 1895 (basionym); Vexillum (Pusia) honestum (Melvill & Standen, 1895) ·

Species of gastropod

Vexillum honestum is a species of small sea snail, marine gastropod mollusk in the family Costellariidae, the ribbed miters.

== Description ==
The length of the shell attains 10 mm, its diameter is 4.5 mm.

== Distribution ==
This marine species occurs off the Loyalty Islands.
