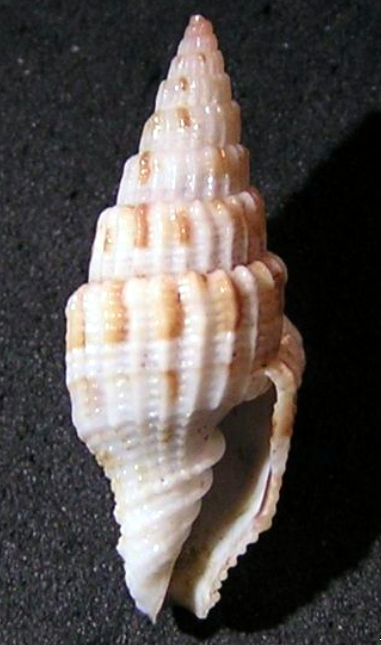
- Shell of Vexillum pyropus

Scientific classification
- Kingdom: Animalia
- Phylum: Mollusca
- Class: Gastropoda
- Subclass: Caenogastropoda
- Order: Neogastropoda
- Superfamily: Turbinelloidea
- Family: Costellariidae
- Genus: Vexillum
- Species: V. pyropus

Binomial name
- Vexillum pyropus Turner & Marrow, 2001

Synonyms
- Vexillum (Costellaria) pyropus ^{H. Turner & Marrow, 2001}

= Vexillum pyropus =

Species of gastropod

Vexillum pyropus is a species of small sea snail, marine gastropod mollusk in the family Costellariidae, the ribbed miters.

== Description ==
The length of the shell attains 22 mm.

== Distribution ==
This marine species occurs off the Philippines.
