= Vexillum monscorallum =

Scientific classification
- Kingdom: Animalia
- Phylum: Mollusca
- Class: Gastropoda
- Subclass: Caenogastropoda
- Order: Neogastropoda
- Superfamily: Turbinelloidea
- Family: Costellariidae
- Genus: Vexillum
- Species: V. monscorallum

Binomial name
- Vexillum monscorallum Hoffman & Freiwald, 2019

Species of gastropod

Vexillum monscorallum is a species of small sea snail, marine gastropod mollusk in the family Costellariidae, the ribbed miters.

== Distribution ==
This marine species occurs off Mauretania.
