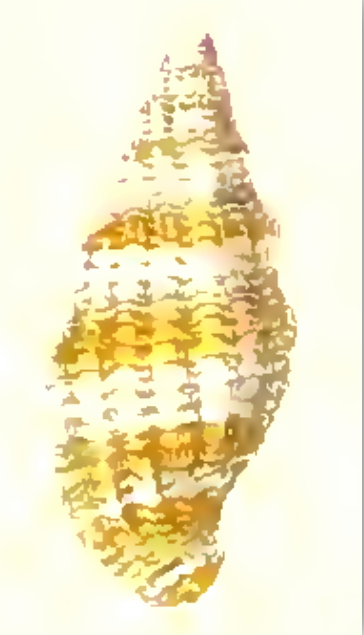
- Original image of a shell of Vexillum zelotypum

Scientific classification
- Kingdom: Animalia
- Phylum: Mollusca
- Class: Gastropoda
- Subclass: Caenogastropoda
- Order: Neogastropoda
- Superfamily: Turbinelloidea
- Family: Costellariidae
- Genus: Vexillum
- Species: V. zelotypum

Binomial name
- Vexillum zelotypum (Reeve, 1845)

Synonyms
- Mitra zelotypa Reeve, 1845; Vexillum (Costellaria) zelotypum (Reeve, 1845)

= Vexillum zelotypum =

Species of gastropod

Vexillum zelotypum, common name the jealous mitre, is a species of sea snail, a marine gastropod mollusk, in the family Costellariidae, the ribbed miters.

== Description ==
The length of the shell attains 18 mm.

(Original description) The shell is ovate. The whorls are rounded at the upper part, longitudinally ribbed, transversely strongly cancellately ridged. They are banded throughout with yellow and white. The columella is four-plaited. The interior of the aperture is pale violet.

== Distribution ==
This marine species occurs off Samoa.
