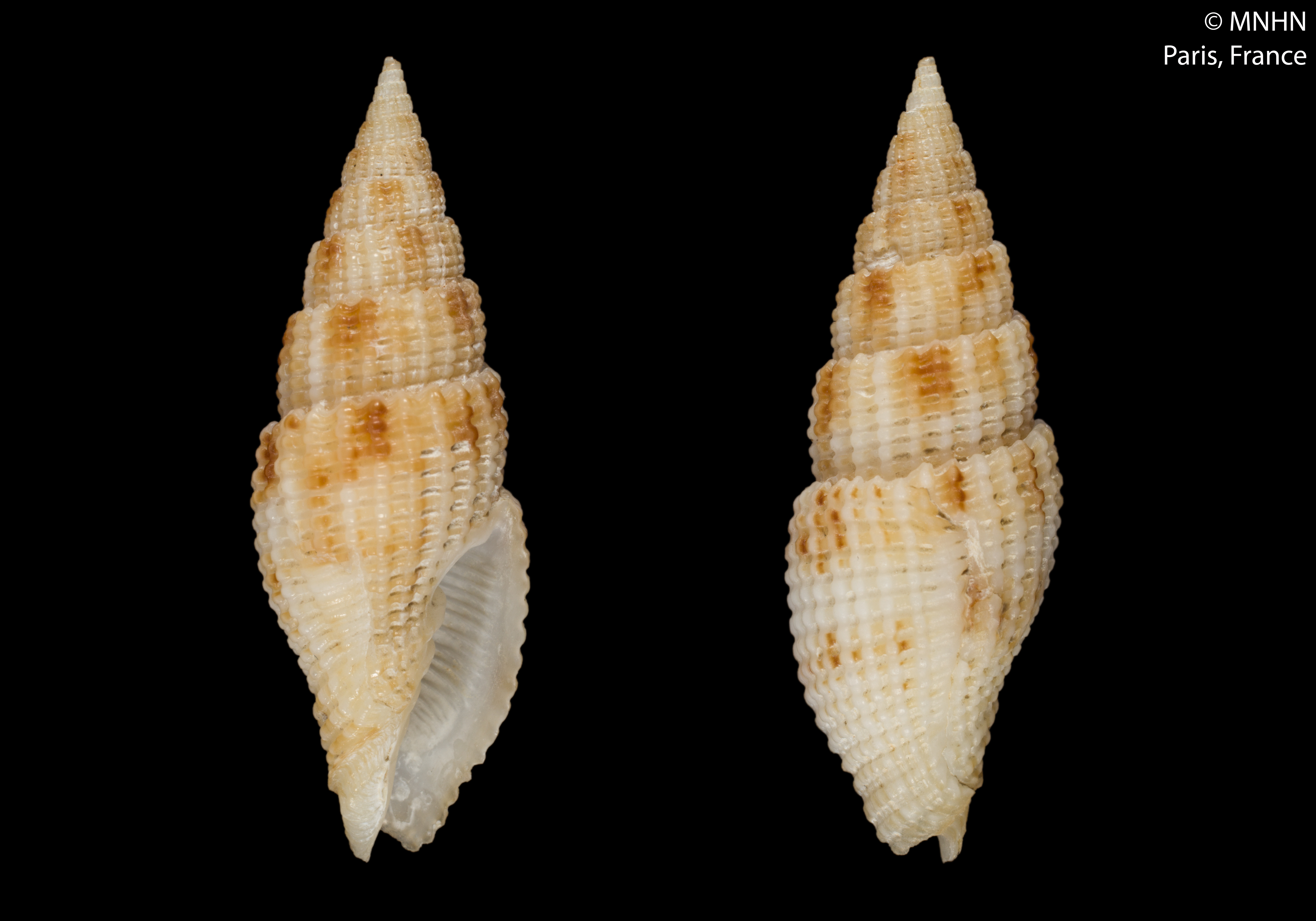
- Shell of Vexillum asperum (holotype at MNHN, Paris)

Scientific classification
- Kingdom: Animalia
- Phylum: Mollusca
- Class: Gastropoda
- Subclass: Caenogastropoda
- Order: Neogastropoda
- Family: Costellariidae
- Genus: Vexillum
- Species: V. asperum

Binomial name
- Vexillum asperum Turner, 2008

Synonyms
- Vexillum (Costellaria) asperum Turner, 2008

= Vexillum asperum =

Species of gastropod

Vexillum asperum is a species of small sea snail, marine gastropod mollusk in the family Costellariidae, the ribbed miters.

== Description ==
The length of the shell attains 27.9 mm.

== Distribution ==
This marine species occurs off the Philippines.
