= Vexillum torotortum =

Scientific classification
- Kingdom: Animalia
- Phylum: Mollusca
- Class: Gastropoda
- Subclass: Caenogastropoda
- Order: Neogastropoda
- Superfamily: Turbinelloidea
- Family: Costellariidae
- Genus: Vexillum
- Species: V. torotortum

Binomial name
- Vexillum torotortum Turner, Gori & Salisbury, 2007

Synonyms
- Pusia torotortum H. Turner, S. Gori & R. Salisbury, 2007; Vexillum (Pusia) torotortum H. Turner, Gori & R. Salisbury, 2007

Species of gastropod

Vexillum torotortum is a species of small sea snail, marine gastropod mollusk in the family Costellariidae, the ribbed miters.

== Description ==
The length of the shell attains 9 mm.

== Distribution ==
This marine species occurs off the Maldives.
