= Vexillum torricella =

Scientific classification
- Kingdom: Animalia
- Phylum: Mollusca
- Class: Gastropoda
- Subclass: Caenogastropoda
- Order: Neogastropoda
- Family: Costellariidae
- Genus: Vexillum
- Species: V. torricella

Binomial name
- Vexillum torricella Turner, 2008

Synonyms
- Vexillum (Costellaria) torricella Turner, 2008

Species of gastropod

Vexillum torricella is a species of small sea snail, marine gastropod in the family Costellariidae, the ribbed miters. V. torricella was first described in 2008.

== Description ==
The length of the shell attains 18 mm.

== Distribution ==
This marine species occurs in intertidal zones (10 to 30 meters depth) in the Solomon Islands, Indonesia, and the Philippines.
