= Vexillum multitriangulum =

Scientific classification
- Kingdom: Animalia
- Phylum: Mollusca
- Class: Gastropoda
- Subclass: Caenogastropoda
- Order: Neogastropoda
- Superfamily: Turbinelloidea
- Family: Costellariidae
- Genus: Vexillum
- Species: V. multitriangulum

Binomial name
- Vexillum multitriangulum Salisbury & Callomon, 1988

Synonyms
- Vexillum (Pusia) multitriangulum R. Salisbury & Callomon, 1998

Species of gastropod

Vexillum multitriangulum is a species of small sea snail, marine gastropod mollusk in the family Costellariidae, the ribbed miters.

== Distribution ==
This marine species occurs off the Philippines and Japan.
