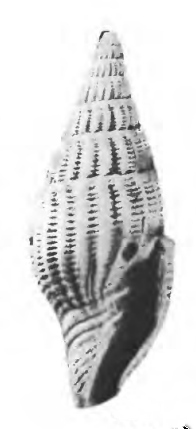
- Shell of Vexillum strasfogeli (holotype)

Scientific classification
- Kingdom: Animalia
- Phylum: Mollusca
- Class: Gastropoda
- Subclass: Caenogastropoda
- Order: Neogastropoda
- Superfamily: Turbinelloidea
- Family: Costellariidae
- Genus: Vexillum
- Species: †V. strasfogeli

Binomial name
- †Vexillum strasfogeli Ladd, 1977

Synonyms
- † Vexillum (Costellaria) strasfogeli Ladd, 1977

= Vexillum strasfogeli =

Species of gastropod

Vexillum strasfogeli is an extinct species of sea snail, a marine gastropod mollusk, in the family Costellariidae, the ribbed miters.

== Description ==
The length of the shell attains 14.8 mm, its diameter 5.7 mm.

(original description) The shell is small and stout. The protoconch is incomplete but apparently smooth, followed by about seven sculptured whorls that are nearly flat and slightly angulated at the sutures. The aperture measures less than half the total length. The columella contains four strong folds. The sculpture consists of strong, narrow, slightly curved axial ribs, 17–19 on the penultimate whorl, and closely set spiral ribs in the intervening areas, 10–11 on the penultimate whorl. The spiral sculpture becomes dominant near the base, the spirals nodose.

== Distribution ==
Fossils of this marine species were found in late Pliocene strata in Fiji.
