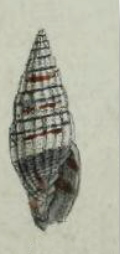
- Original image of a shell of Vexillum fuscoapicatum

Scientific classification
- Kingdom: Animalia
- Phylum: Mollusca
- Class: Gastropoda
- Subclass: Caenogastropoda
- Order: Neogastropoda
- Family: Costellariidae
- Genus: Vexillum
- Species: V. fuscoapicatum

Binomial name
- Vexillum fuscoapicatum (E. A. Smith, 1879)

Synonyms
- Costellaria bronni R.W. Dunker, 1860; Mitra (Costellaria) fuscoapicata E. A. Smith, 1879 ·; Mitra brionae bronni Dunker, 1860; Mitra bronni Dunker, 1860 junior subjective synonym; Mitra fuscoapicata E. A. Smith, 1879 (original combination); Vexillum (Costellaria) fuscoapicatum (E. A. Smith, 1879)

= Vexillum fuscoapicatum =

Species of gastropod

Vexillum fuscoapicatum is a species of small sea snail, marine gastropod mollusk in the family Costellariidae, the ribbed miters.

== Description ==
The length of the shell varies between 18 mm and 33 mm.

(Original description) The fusiform shell is whitish, stained with brown at the apex, obscurely banded with bluish ash a little below the top of the whorls, and spotted irregularly with brown in the same part, generally between the ribs. The lower half of the body whorl is cinereous brown. The shell consists of ten whorls The one to two apical ones are smooth and globose. The rest are almost flat at the sides, scarcely turreted, longitudinally ribbed and spirally sulcated between the ribs. The latter are about 17 in number on the penultimate whorl, a little arcuate and oblique, about half as broad as the interspaces between them. The spiral cords are interrupted by the ribs, five on the upper whorls, moderately deep and subequidistant. The ribs on the body whorl are alternate at the base, and at this part are cut across by the oblique transverse grooves, producing nodules upon them . One of the ridges between the sulci, which is in a line or continuous with the uppermost fold on the columella, is conspicuous, being a little thicker than the rest. The aperture is generally internally lirate, small, narrow, with a white band within a little above the middle, and two interrupted brown zones, one above and the other below the white one. The columella shows a callus near the extremity of the outer lip, with four folds, the two uppermost grooved so as to appear duplex. The short siphonal canal is open recurved.

== Distribution ==
This marine species occurs off Japan, Taiwan, and the Philippines.
