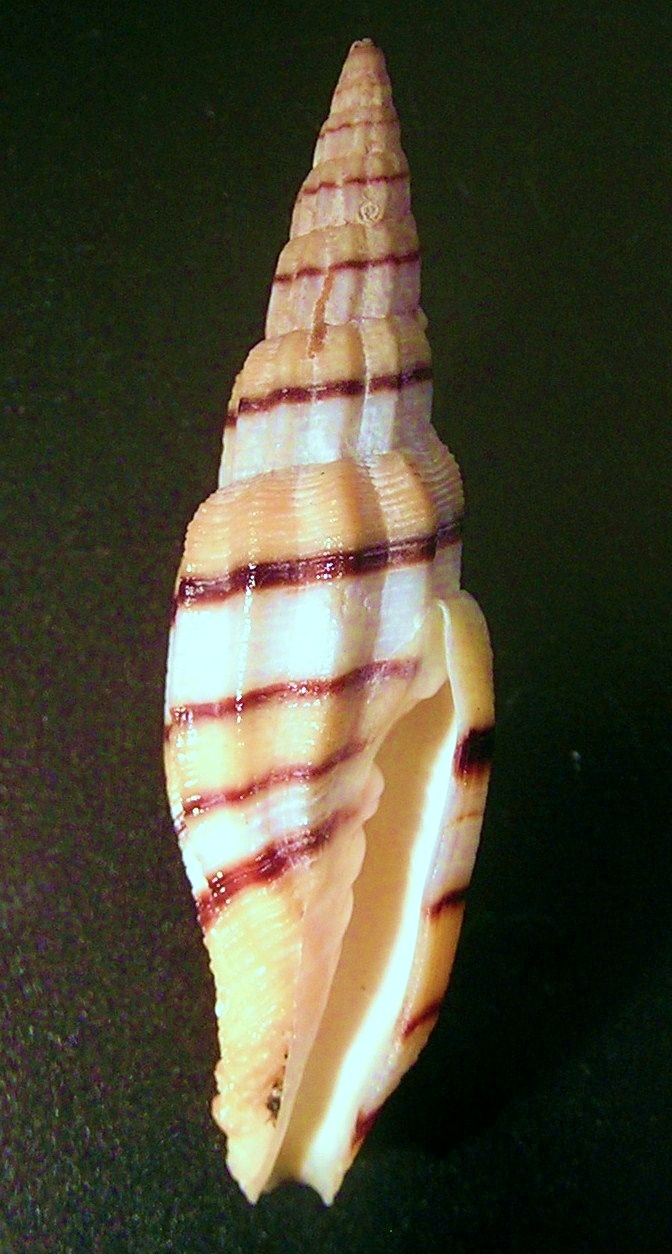
- An apertural view of a shell of Vexillum taeniatum

Scientific classification
- Kingdom: Animalia
- Phylum: Mollusca
- Class: Gastropoda
- Subclass: Caenogastropoda
- Order: Neogastropoda
- Superfamily: Turbinelloidea
- Family: Costellariidae
- Genus: Vexillum; Röding, 1798

Type species
- Vexillum plicatum Röding, 1798

Synonyms
- Arenimitra Iredale, 1929; Callithea Swainson, 1840 (invalid: junior homonym of Callithea Feisthamel, 1835; Pulchritima is a replacement name); Costellaria Swainson, 1840; Mitra (Callithea) Swainson, 1840; Mitra (Costellaria) Swainson, 1840; Mitra (Harpaeformis) Lesson, 1842; Mitra (Tiara) Swainson, 1831; Mitra (Turricula) H. Adams & A. Adams, 1853; Mitra (Uromitra) ·; Mitra (Vulpecula) Blainville, 1824; Mitropifex Iredale, 1929; Pulchritima Iredale, 1929; Pusiolina Cossmann, 1921; Tiara Swainson, 1831; Tiara (Callithea) Swainson, 1840 (original rank); Tiara (Costellaria) Swainson, 1840; Turricula Fabricius, 1823 non Schumacher, 1817; Turricula H. Adams & A. Adams, 1853; Turricula (Callithea) Swainson, 1840 ·; Turricula (Costellaria) Swainson, 1840; †Turricula (Uromitra) Bellardi, 1887; Turricula (Vulpecula) Blainville, 1824; Uromitra Bellardi, 1887; Vexillum (Costellaria) Swainson, 1840; †Vexillum (Uromitra) Bellardi, 1888; Vexillum (Vexillum) Röding, 1798; Vulpecula Blainville, 1824; Zierliana Gray, 1847

= Vexillum (gastropod) =

Genus of gastropods

Vexillum is a genus of small to medium-sized sea snails, marine gastropod molluscs in the family Costellariidae.

This genus is not monophyletic. The genus Vexillum contains about 80% of costellariid diversity. It is considered a "dumping ground" for an array of unrelated forms.

== Description ==
The shell is elongated, turreted, longitudinally ribbed or plicate. The spire is acuminated. The aperture is narrow. The columella shows numerous plaits. The outer lip is internally striated.

Vexillum species produce complex venoms dominated by highly diversified short cysteine-rich peptides, called vexitoxins, related to conotoxins.

== Distribution ==
This genus is cosmopolitan and occurs in tropical and temperate seas, but primarily in shallow waters (though also at bathyal depths) of the tropical Indo-Pacific.

== Species ==
Species within the genus Vexillum include:

- Vexillum accinctum (G. B. Sowerby III, 1907)
- Vexillum acromiale (Hedley, 1915)
- Vexillum acuminatum (Gmelin, 1791)
- Vexillum acupictum (Reeve, 1845)
- Vexillum adamsi (Dohrn, 1861)
- Vexillum adamsianum Cernohorsky, 1978
- Vexillum adelense Marrow, 2019
- Vexillum adornatum (Tomlin, 1920)
- Vexillum aemula (E. A. Smith, 1879)
- Vexillum aequatoriense Herrmann & Stossier, 2011
- † Vexillum aequicostatum (Koenen, 1885)
- Vexillum aethiopicum (Jickeli, 1874)
- Vexillum aideni R. Salisbury, Gori & Rosado, 2024
- Vexillum aimee S.-I Huang, 2024
- † Vexillum aizyense (Deshayes, 1865)
- Vexillum albocinctum (C. B. Adams, 1845)
- Vexillum albofulvum Herrmann, 2007
- Vexillum alboglobulatum R. Salisbury & Gori, 2019
- Vexillum albolineatum Cossignani & Cossignani, 2007
- † Vexillum alfuricum (P. J. Fischer, 1927)
- Vexillum albotaeniatum (Hervier, 1897)
- Vexillum alvinobalani Guillot de Suduiraut, 1999
- Vexillum amabile (Reeve, 1845)
- Vexillum amandum (Reeve, 1845)
- Vexillum amentare S.-I. Huang, 2017
- Vexillum amicum Fedosov, Bouchet, Dekkers, Gori, S.-I Huang, Kantor, Lemarcis, Marrow, Ratti, Rosenberg, R. Salisbury, Zvonareva & Puillandre, 2025
- Vexillum anapaulae R. Salisbury, Gori & Rosado, 2024
- † Vexillum angsananum (K. Martin, 1921)
- Vexillum anapaulae R. Salisbury, Gori & Rosado, 2024
- Vexillum angulosum (Küster, 1839)
- Vexillum angustissimum (E.A. Smith, 1903)
- Vexillum anthracinum (Reeve, 1844)
- Vexillum antonellii (Dhorn, 1860)
- † Vexillum aokii Shuto, 1982
- Vexillum appelii (Jickeli, 1874)
- Vexillum approximatum (Pease, 1860)
- Vexillum arabicum Turner, 2008
- Vexillum asperpallidum Poppe & Tagaro, 2026 (original description)
- Vexillum asperum Turner, 2008
- Vexillum atilanoi Poppe & Tagaro, 2026 (original description)
- † Vexillum atractoides (Tate, 1889)
- Vexillum aureolatum (Reeve, 1844)
- Vexillum aureolineatum H. Turner, 1988
- † Vexillum badense (R. Hoernes & Auinger, 1880)
- Vexillum baeri Poppe, Tagaro & Salisbury, 2009
- Vexillum balicasagense Salisbury & Guillot de Suduiraut, 2006
- Vexillum balteolatum (Reeve, 1844)
- Vexillum bancalanense (Bartsch, 1918)
- Vexillum bangertarum Herrmann, 2019
- † Vexillum barbieri (Deshayes, 1865)
- † Vexillum batavianum (K. Martin, 1884)
- † Vexillum bayeri (Koperberg, 1931)
- Vexillum beitzi R. Salisbury & Gori, 2013
- Vexillum bellum (Pease, 1860)
- Vexillum bergae T. Cossignani, 2020
- Vexillum beverlyae Turner & Salisbury, 1999
- † Vexillum bicatenatum (K. Martin, 1935)
- † Vexillum biornatum (Tate, 1889)
- Vexillum bipartitum (E. A. Smith, 1884)
- Vexillum bizonale (Dautzenberg & Bouge, 1923)
- Vexillum blandulum Turner, 1997
- Vexillum bloodymary Fedosov, Bouchet, Dekkers, Gori, S.-I Huang, Kantor, Lemarcis, Marrow, Ratti, Rosenberg, R. Salisbury, Zvonareva & Puillandre, 2025
- † Vexillum boreocinctum (Kautsky, 1925)
- † Vexillum bouryi (Cossmann, 1889)
- Vexillum bouteti R. Salisbury & Herrmann, 2012
- † Vexillum boutillieri (Cossmann, 1889)
- Vexillum brunneolinea Rosenberg & Salisbury, 1991
- Vexillum burchorum R. Salisbury, 2011
- Vexillum buriasense (Tomlin, 1920)
- Vexillum cadaverosum (Reeve, 1844)
- Vexillum caelatum (Reeve, 1845)
- Vexillum caffrum (Linnaeus, 1758)
- Vexillum caliendrum (Melvill & Standen, 1901)
- Vexillum caligulum S.-I Huang & M.-H. Lin, 2020
- Vexillum callosum (Reeve, 1845)
- Vexillum caloxestum (Melvill, 1888)
- Vexillum cancellarioides (Anton, 1838)
- Vexillum castaneostriatum Herrmann, 2012
- † Vexillum caudatum (Marwick, 1931)
- Vexillum cavea (Reeve, 1844)
- † Vexillum cernohorskyi Ladd, 1977
- Vexillum charlesi Turner & Callomon, 2001
- Vexillum chelonia (Reeve, 1845)
- Vexillum chibaense (Salisbury & Rosenberg, 1999)
- Vexillum chickcharneorum Lyons & Kaicher, 1978
- Vexillum chinoi Poppe, 2008
- Vexillum chocotinctum Turner, 2008
- Vexillum cingulatum (Lamarck, 1811)
- Vexillum cithara (Reeve, 1845)
- Vexillum citrinum (Gmelin, 1791)
- Vexillum clathratum (Reeve, 1844)
- Vexillum coccineum (Reeve, 1844)
- Vexillum collinsoni (A. Adams, 1864)
- Vexillum coloreum S.-I. Huang, 2017
- Vexillum coloscopulus J. M. Cate, 1961
- Vexillum concentricum (Reeve, 1844)
- Vexillum consanguineum (Reeve, 1845)
- Vexillum cookorum Turner, Gori & Salisbury, 2007
- Vexillum corbicula (Sowerby II, 1870)
- Vexillum coronatum (Helbling, 1779)
- Vexillum cosmani (Kay, 1979)
- Vexillum costatum (Gmelin, 1791)
- Vexillum creatum Marrow, 2019
- Vexillum crispum (Garrett, 1872)
- Vexillum crocatum (Lamarck, 1811)
- Vexillum croceorbis Dekkers, 2013
- Vexillum croceostoma Marrow, 2015
- Vexillum croceum (Reeve, 1845)
- † Vexillum ctenotum J. Gardner, 1937
- Vexillum cumingii (Reeve, 1844)
- † Vexillum curtum (Bellardi, 1888) †
- Vexillum curviliratum (Sowerby II & Sowerby III, 1874)
- Vexillum daedalum (Reeve, 1845)
- † Vexillum dahanaensis (Vlerk, 1931)
- Vexillum dampierense Marrow, 2019
- Vexillum daniellae Drivas & Jay, 1989
- Vexillum darwini Salisbury & Guillot de Suduiraut, 2006
- Vexillum decorum (Reeve, 1845)
- Vexillum delicatum (A. Adams, 1853)
- Vexillum delstonei R. Salisbury, Gori & Rosado, 2024
- † Vexillum deningeri (K. Martin, 1916)
- Vexillum dennisoni (Reeve, 1844)
- Vexillum depexum (Deshayes, 1834)
- Vexillum derkai Herrmann, 2012
- Vexillum dermestinum (Lamarck, 1811)
- Vexillum deshayesi (Reeve, 1845)
- Vexillum dhofarense Gori, Rosado & R. Salisbury, 2019
- Vexillum diaconale (Melvill & Standen, 1903)
- † Vexillum dijki (K. Martin, 1906)
- Vexillum dilectissimum (Melvill & Sykes, 1899)
- Vexillum discolorium (Reeve, 1845)
- Vexillum diutenerum (Hervier, 1897)
- Vexillum doctoi Poppe & Tagaro, 2026 (original description)
- Vexillum dohrni (A. Adams, 1864)
- Vexillum dorleti T. Cossignani & V. Cossignani, 2021
- Vexillum echinatum (A. Adams, 1853)
- † Vexillum elatior (Finlay, 1924)
- Vexillum elodieae Poppe & Tagaro, 2026 (original description)
- Vexillum emagotoae Poppe & Tagaro, 2026
- Vexillum emmanueli Buijse, Dekker & Verbinnen, 2009
- Vexillum epigonus Salisbury & Guillot de Suduiraut, 2006
- † Vexillum escharoides (Tate, 1889)
- † Vexillum etremoides (Finlay, 1924)
- † Vexillum euglypha (Tate, 1889)
- † Vexillum eusulcatum (Finlay, 1924)
- Vexillum exaratum (A. Adams, 1853)
- Vexillum exasperatum (Gmelin, 1791)
- Vexillum exostium Marrow, 2019
- Vexillum expolitum Poppe & Tagaro, 2026 (original description)
- Vexillum exquisitum (Garrett, 1873)
- † Vexillum extraneum (Deshayes, 1865)
- † Vexillum faxense (Ravn, 1902)
- Vexillum ficulinum (Lamarck, 1811)
- Vexillum fidicula (Gould, 1850)
- Vexillum filistriatum (Sowerby II & Sowerby III, 1874)
- Vexillum flaveoricum Herrmann & Guillot de Suduiraut, 2009
- Vexillum flexicostatum (Garrett, 1880)
- Vexillum formosense (Sowerby III, 1889)
- Vexillum fortiplicatum (Pease, 1868)
- Vexillum fraudator Turner, Gori & Salisbury, 2007
- † Vexillum fulleri (MacNeil, 1961)
- Vexillum funereum (Reeve, 1844)
- Vexillum fuscoapicatum (E. A. Smith, 1879)
- Vexillum fuscobandatum Bozzetti, 2007
- Vexillum fuscotaeniatum (Thiele, 1925)
- Vexillum fuscovirgatum Herrmann & R. Salisbury, 2012
- Vexillum gagei R. Salisbury, 2011
- Vexillum garciai Salisbury & Wolff, 2009
- † Vexillum gaudryi (de Raincourt, 1884)
- † Vexillum gembacanum (K. Martin, 1884)
- Vexillum germaineae Herrmann & R. Salisbury, 2014
- Vexillum giselae Poppe, Tagaro & Salisbury, 2009
- † Vexillum gliberti Anderson, 1964
- Vexillum gloriae Poppe, Tagaro & Salisbury, 2009
- Vexillum glosseanum Marrow, 2025
- † Vexillum gonzabuense (MacNeil, 1961)
- Vexillum gorii Turner, 1997
- Vexillum gotoense (E. A. Smith, 1879)
- Vexillum goubini (Hervier, 1897)
- Vexillum gouldi Salisbury & Guillot de Suduiraut, 2006
- Vexillum gourgueti R. Salisbury & Herrmann, 2012
- Vexillum gruneri (Reeve, 1844)
- Vexillum guidopoppei Thach, 2017
- Vexillum hansturneri Gori, Rosado & R. Salisbury, 2019
- † Vexillum harmati Csepreghy-Meznerics, 1954
- Vexillum hawksbillense Marrow, 2019
- Vexillum helena (Bartsch, 1915)
- † Vexillum hemigymnum (Cossmann & Pissarro, 1901)
- Vexillum herosae Herrmann & Salisbury, 2012
- Vexillum hervieri (Dautzenberg & Bouge, 1923)
- Vexillum hilare (Kuroda, 1971)
- Vexillum hoaraui Guillot de Suduiraut, 2007
- Vexillum honestum (Melvill & Standen, 1895)
- Vexillum horroi R. Salisbury, Gori & Rosado, 2024
- Vexillum houarti Thach, 2016
- Vexillum huangorum Salisbury & Gori, 2012
- Vexillum humile (Hervier, 1897)
- Vexillum hybridum (Kiener, 1838)
- † Vexillum ickei (K. Martin, 1906)
- † Vexillum indistinctum (K. Martin, 1935)
- Vexillum indolyratum Dekkers, 2024
- Vexillum infaustum (Reeve, 1845)
- Vexillum innamoratum S.-I Huang, 2024
- Vexillum innocens (Thiele, 1925)
- Vexillum innotabile (E. A. Smith, 1890)
- Vexillum intermedium (Kiener, 1838)
- † Vexillum intermittens (R. Hoernes & Auinger, 1880)
- Vexillum interpunctatum (Odhner, 1919)
- Vexillum interruptum (Anton, 1838)
- Vexillum interstriatum (Sowerby II, 1870)
- Vexillum intertaeniatum (Sowerby II, 1874)
- Vexillum iredalei (Powell, 1958)
- Vexillum ismene Turner, 2008
- Vexillum iteinum (Melvill, 1918)
- Vexillum iuppiterale S.-I. Huang, 2017
- Vexillum jacksoni R. Salisbury, 2011
- Vexillum jackylenae Salisbury & Guillot de Suduiraut, 2006
- Vexillum janae T. Cossignani & Lorenz, 2020
- Vexillum japonicum A. Adams, 1864
- Vexillum jasoni R. Salisbury, 2011
- † Vexillum javana (K. Martin, 1879)
- Vexillum jeanetteae R. Salisbury, 2019
- Vexillum jeciliae Poppe, Tagaro & Salisbury, 2009
- Vexillum johnsoni R. Salisbury, 2019
- Vexillum johnwattsi Dekkers, 2011
- Vexillum jonae S.-I. Huang, 2017
- † Vexillum jonkeri (K. Martin, 1884)
- Vexillum jukesii (A. Adams, 1853)
- Vexillum kathiewayae R. Salisbury, Herrmann & Dekkers, 2012
- Vexillum kawamotoae R. Salisbury, 2011
- Vexillum kedrici R. Salisbury, Gori & Rosado, 2024
- Vexillum kimberleyianum Marrow, 2025
- Vexillum kimiyum Turner, 2008
- Vexillum kraussi (Dunker, 1861)
- Vexillum kuboi Turner, Gori & Salisbury, 2007
- Vexillum kuiperi Turner, 2006
- Vexillum laetum Fedosov, Bouchet, Dekkers, Gori, S.-I Huang, Kantor, Lemarcis, Marrow, Ratti, Rosenberg, R. Salisbury, Zvonareva & Puillandre, 2025
- Vexillum latte S.-I Huang, 2026
- Vexillum leforti Turner & Salisbury, 1999
- Vexillum lenhilli Kay, 1979
- † Vexillum leptaleum (Tate, 1889)
- Vexillum leucodesma (Reeve, 1845)
- Vexillum leucophryna Turner & Marrow, 2001
- Vexillum leucozonias (Deshayes in Laborde, 1834)
- Vexillum levosadai Poppe & Tagaro, 2026 (original description)
- Vexillum leyteensis Poppe, Tagaro & Salisbury, 2009
- Vexillum ligatum (A. Adams, 1853)
- Vexillum liloanense Poppe & Tagaro, 2026 (original description)
- Vexillum longispira (G. B. Sowerby II, 1874)
- Vexillum lornamarrowae Marrow, 2025
- Vexillum lotum (Reeve, 1845)
- Vexillum lucens S.-I Huang & M.-H. Lin, 2020
- Vexillum lucidum (Reeve, 1845)
- Vexillum luculentum (Reeve, 1845)
- Vexillum luigiraybaudii Poppe, Guillot de Suduiraut & Tagaro, 2006
- Vexillum lumilum S.-I Huang & M.-H. Lin, 2020
- Vexillum lyratum (Lamarck, 1822)
- Vexillum macandrewi (Sowerby II & Sowerby II, 1874)
- Vexillum macchiato S.-I Huang, 2026
- Vexillum macrospira (A. Adams, 1853)
- Vexillum maduranum Dekkers, 2007
- Vexillum malcolmense (Melvill & Standen, 1901)
- Vexillum malleopunctum (Cernohorsky, 1981)
- Vexillum maribagoi Poppe & Tagaro, 2026 (original description)
- Vexillum marmoreum (A. Adams, 1853)
- Vexillum marotiriense Herrmann & R. Salisbury, 2012
- † Vexillum martini (O. Boettger, 1883)
- † Vexillum martini Schepman, 1907 (unreplaced junior homonym)
- Vexillum maxencei Cossignani, 2018
- Vexillum mccauslandi Salisbury & Wolff, 2005
- Vexillum mediomaculatum (G.B. Sowerby II, 1870)
- Vexillum meigotoae Poppe & Tagaro, 2026
- Vexillum meimiaoae S.-I Huang, 2025
- Vexillum melongena (Lamarck, 1811)
- Vexillum menehune R. Salisbury, 2011
- Vexillum meslivres S.-I Huang, 2023
- Vexillum mica (Reeve, 1845)
- Vexillum michaelianum R. Salisbury, 2011
- Vexillum michaui (Crosse & Fischer, 1864)
- † Vexillum michelottii (M. Hörnes, 1852)
- Vexillum micra (Pilsbry, 1921)
- Vexillum microstricosum Fedosov, Bouchet, Dekkers, Gori, S.-I Huang, Kantor, Lemarcis, Marrow, Ratti, Rosenberg, R. Salisbury, Zvonareva & Puillandre, 2025
- Vexillum militare (Reeve, 1845)
- Vexillum millecostatum (Broderip, 1836)
- Vexillum milleinsularum S.-I Huang, 2025
- Vexillum millerae Marrow & Gori, 2025
- † Vexillum minahassae (Schepman, 1907)
- Vexillum minghuii S.-I. Huang, 2017
- Vexillum mirabile (A. Adams, 1853)
- Vexillum mirbatense Gori, Rosado & R. Salisbury, 2019
- Vexillum mirissaense Gori, 2023
- Vexillum mite Marrow, 2025
- Vexillum modestum (Reeve, 1845)
- Vexillum moelleri (Küster, 1840)
- Vexillum monalizae Poppe, Guillot de Suduiraut & Tagaro, 2006
- Vexillum monscorallum Hoffman & Freiwald, 2019
- Vexillum monsecourorum Poppe, Guillot de Suduiraut & Tagaro, 2006
- Vexillum mucronatum (Gmelin, 1791)
- Vexillum multicostatum (Broderip, 1836)
- Vexillum multitriangulum Salisbury & Callomon, 1998
- Vexillum mutabile (Reeve, 1845)
- Vexillum nakama (Dall, 1926)
- Vexillum nampulaensis R. Salisbury, Gori & Rosado, 2024
- Vexillum nasinii T. Cossignani & V. Cossignani, 2021
- † Vexillum nasongoense (Ladd, 1934)
- Vexillum nathani T. Cossignani, 2021
- Vexillum neogranosum Fedosov, Bouchet, Dekkers, Gori, S.-I Huang, Kantor, Lemarcis, Marrow, Ratti, Rosenberg, R. Salisbury, Zvonareva & Puillandre, 2025
- † Vexillum neozelanicum (Laws, 1939)
- † Vexillum neudorfense (Schaffer, 1897)
- Vexillum nicobaricum (Dunker, 1866)
- Vexillum nigripulchrum R. Salisbury, Gori & Rosado, 2024
- † Vexillum nitidum (Schaffer, 1897)
- Vexillum nivale Herrmann & Guillot de Suduiraut, 2009
- Vexillum nobile Marrow, 2025
- Vexillum nodai Turner & Salisbury, 1999
- Vexillum noduliferum (A. Adams, 1853)
- Vexillum obeliscus (Reeve, 1844)
- Vexillum obscurum Poppe & Tagaro, 2026 (original description)
- Vexillum obtusispinosum (G. B. Sowerby II, 1874)
- Vexillum ochraceum (Hervier, 1897)
- Vexillum oleaceum (Reeve, 1844)
- Vexillum oniscinum (Lamarck, 1811)
- Vexillum oryzum Kay, 1979
- Vexillum oteroi R. Salisbury & Gori, 2013
- Vexillum pacificum (Reeve, 1845)
- Vexillum pagodula (Hervier, 1897)
- Vexillum palauense R. Salisbury & Gori, 2019
- Vexillum paligerum (Sowerby II & Sowerby III, 1874)
- † Vexillum palmerae (Perrilliat, 1973)
- Vexillum pantherinum Herrmann & R. Salisbury, 2012
- Vexillum pasitheum (Melvill & Standen, 1901)
- Vexillum patulum (Reeve, 1845)
- Vexillum pedroi Poppe & Tagaro, 2006
- Vexillum pelaezi Poppe, Tagaro & Salisbury, 2009
- Vexillum pellucidum (Tate, 1887)
- Vexillum percnodictya (Melvill, 1888)
- Vexillum perrieri (Dautzenberg, 1929)
- Vexillum philtwoi Poppe, Tagaro & Salisbury, 2009
- Vexillum picardali Herrmann & Stossier, 2011
- Vexillum piceum (Pease, 1860)
- Vexillum pilsbryi (Hedley, 1899)
- Vexillum pisolinum (Lamarck, 1811)
- Vexillum plicarium (Linnaeus, 1758)
- Vexillum plurinotatum (Hervier, 1897)
- Vexillum politum (Reeve, 1844)
- Vexillum polygonum (Gmelin, 1791)
- Vexillum poppei Guillot de Suduiraut, 2007
- Vexillum potieri Drivas & Jay, 1989
- Vexillum praeclarum Dekkers & Stossier, 2025
- Vexillum praefulguratum Poppe, 2008
- Vexillum praetextum (G. B. Sowerby II, 1870)
- Vexillum pristisinuosum Marrow, 2019
- † Vexillum progoensis (K. Martin, 1916)
- Vexillum pseudomonalizae Gori, Rosado & R. Salisbury, 2019
- † Vexillum pseudoschafferi Biskupič, 2020
- Vexillum puerile (Cooke, 1885)
- Vexillum purpuratum (Reeve, 1845)
- † Vexillum pusillum (Ravn, 1933)
- † Vexillum pyramidellum (Brocchi, 1814)
- Vexillum pyropus Turner & Marrow, 2001
- Vexillum radius (Reeve, 1845)
- Vexillum radix (Sowerby II & Sowerby III, 1874)
- † Vexillum rajaensis (K. Martin, 1895)
- Vexillum raywalkeri Marrow, 2025
- Vexillum recteclatrus Marrow, 2025
- † Vexillum recticosta (Bellardi, 1850)
- Vexillum recurvirostris (Sowerby III, 1908)
- Vexillum regina (G.B. Sowerby I, 1828)
- † Vexillum rembangense (K. Martin, 1906)
- Vexillum renatoi Poppe, Tagaro & Salisbury, 2009
- Vexillum revelatum (Melvill, 1899)
- Vexillum riccardoi T. Cossignani, 2024
- Vexillum rodgersi Salisbury & Wolff, 2005
- Vexillum rodriguesi R. Salisbury, Gori & Rosado, 2024
- Vexillum rolani Gori, Rosado & R. Salisbury, 2019
- Vexillum romanii R. Salisbury, Gori & Rosado, 2024
- † Vexillum rosenkrantzi Hansen, 2019
- Vexillum roseotinctum (Hervier, 1897)
- Vexillum roseum (Broderip, 1836)
- Vexillum rubellum (Adams & Reeve, 1850)
- Vexillum rubricatum (Reeve, 1845)
- Vexillum rubrocostatum Habe & Kosuge, 1966
- Vexillum rubrozonatum Marrow & Gori, 2025
- Vexillum rugosum (Gmelin, 1791)
- Vexillum rusticum (Reeve, 1845)
- Vexillum salisburyi Cernohorsky, 1976
- Vexillum salmoneum (G. B. Sowerby II, 1874)
- Vexillum sanctahelenae (E. A. Smith, 1890)
- Vexillum sanguisuga (Linnaeus, 1758)
- † Vexillum schafferi (Meznerics, 1933)
- † Vexillum schepmani (Koperberg, 1931)
- Vexillum scitulum (A. Adams, 1853)
- Vexillum sculptile (Reeve, 1845)
- Vexillum semifasciatum (Lamarck, 1811)
- Vexillum semisculptum (Adams & Reeve, 1850)
- Vexillum semiticum (Jickeli, 1874)
- Vexillum severnsi R. Salisbury, 2011
- Vexillum sharkbayense Marrow, 2019
- Vexillum siciliai R. Salisbury & Gori, 2019
- Vexillum sigristi Gori, Rosado & R. Salisbury, 2019
- Vexillum silviae Turner, Gori & Salisbury, 2007
- Vexillum sinuosum Turner, 2008
- Vexillum sitangkaianum J. M. Cate, 1968
- Vexillum smithi (Sowerby III, 1889)
- Vexillum sneidari R. Salisbury, 2011
- Vexillum soelae Marrow, 2025
- Vexillum speciosum (Reeve, 1844)
- Vexillum spicatum (Reeve, 1845)
- Vexillum spiculum Bozzetti, 2013
- Vexillum stainforthii (Reeve, 1842)
- Vexillum stephanuchum (Melvill, 1897)
- Vexillum stercopunctis Turner, 2008
- † Vexillum sterrennacht S.-I Huang & M.-H. Lin, 2026
- Vexillum stossieri Turner & Marrow, 2001
- † Vexillum strasfogeli Ladd, 1977
- Vexillum strnadi Poppe & Tagaro, 2010
- Vexillum subdivisum (Gmelin, 1791)
- Vexillum subquadratum (Sowerby II & Sowerby III, 1874)
- Vexillum subtruncatum (G. B. Sowerby II, 1874)
- † Vexillum sucabumianum (K. Martin, 1906)
- Vexillum suluense (Adams & Reeve, 1850)
- Vexillum sumatranum (Thiele, 1925)
- Vexillum superbiens (Melvill, 1895)
- Vexillum sybillae (Melvill, 1888)
- † Vexillum szobbiensis (Halaváts, 1884)
- † Vexillum taeniataeformis (K. Martin, 1884)
- Vexillum taeniatum (Lamarck, 1811)
- Vexillum takakuwai Cernohorsky & Azuma, 1974
- Vexillum tanguyae Guillot de Suduiraut & Boutet, 2007
- Vexillum tankervillei (Melvill, 1888)
- Vexillum taylorianum (Sowerby II & Sowerby III, 1874)
- Vexillum tenebricosum Gori, Rosado & R. Salisbury, 2019
- † Vexillum tenestolidum Hansen, 2019
- † Vexillum terebelloides (d'Orbigny, 1850)
- † Vexillum terebellum (Lamarck, 1803)
- Vexillum terraqueum S.-I. Huang, 2017
- † Vexillum teschi (MacNeil, 1961) (unreplaced junior homonym of † Vexillum teschi (Koperberg, 1931))
- Vexillum thila Turner, Gori & Salisbury, 2007
- Vexillum tiro S.-I Huang, 2023
- † Vexillum tjilonganensis (K. Martin, 1906)
- Vexillum togianense Herrmann & Kurtz, 2013
- Vexillum tokubeii (Sakura & Habe, 1964)
- Vexillum torotortum Turner, Gori & Salisbury, 2007
- Vexillum torquatum Herrmann, 2012
- Vexillum torricella Turner, 2008
- † Vexillum transalpinum Harzhauser & Landau, 2021
- Vexillum trilineatum Herrmann & Stossier, 2011
- Vexillum troendlei Herrmann & R. Salisbury, 2012
- Vexillum tumidum (Reeve, 1844)
- Vexillum turben (Reeve, 1844)
- Vexillum turriger (Reeve, 1845)
- Vexillum tusum (Reeve, 1845)
- Vexillum umbrosum (G. B. Sowerby II, 1874)
- Vexillum unicolor Herrmann, 2012
- Vexillum unifasciale (Lamarck, 1811)
- Vexillum unifasciatum (Wood, 1828)
- Vexillum utravis (Melvill, 1925)
- Vexillum vandervlerki (Koperberg, 1931)
- Vexillum vangemerti Dekkers, 2014
- Vexillum varicosum Turner, 2008
- Vexillum verecundulum (Hervier, 1897)
- Vexillum vespula Turner & Marrow, 2001
- Vexillum vezzarochristophei Cossignani, 2018
- Vexillum vezzaroi T. Cossignani, 2021
- Vexillum vezzaronellyae T. Cossignani, 2021
- Vexillum vibex (A. Adams, 1853)
- Vexillum vietnga Fedosov, Bouchet, Dekkers, Gori, S.-I Huang, Kantor, Lemarcis, Marrow, Ratti, Rosenberg, R. Salisbury, Zvonareva & Puillandre, 2025
- Vexillum virginale (Lesson, 1842)
- Vexillum virgo (Linne, 1767)
- † Vexillum vokesae (Perrilliat, 1973)
- Vexillum volae Perugia, 2010
- Vexillum voncoseli (Poppe, Tagaro & R. Salisbury, 2009)
- Vexillum vulpecula (Linne, 1758)
- † Vexillum willcoxi (W.H. Dall, 1900)
- † Vexillum wanneri (Tesch, 1915)
- Vexillum woldemarii (Kiener, 1838)
- Vexillum wolfei Cernohorsky, 1978
- Vexillum xenium Pilsbry, 1921
- Vexillum yafani S.-I Huang, 2024
- Vexillum yangi S.-I. Huang, 2017
- Vexillum yenyenae S.-I Huang, 2024
- Vexillum yulini S.-I. Huang, 2017
- Vexillum yvesfineti T. Cossignani & V. Cossignani, 2021
- Vexillum zebuense (Reeve, 1844)
- Vexillum zelotypum (Reeve, 1845)
- Vexillum ziervogelii (Gmelin, 1791)
- Vexillum zikkurat H. Turner, 2000

== Taxa inquirenda ==
- Vexillum lanceolatum (Hervier, 1897) (possible synonym of V. costatum)
- Vexillum thaanumi Pilsbry, 1921
- Vexillum tomlini (Melvill, 1925)
- Mitra (Turricula) rufofilosa E. A. Smith, 1876
- † Vexillum (Uromitra) holmesii (Dall, 1890)
- Mitra (Pusia) elizae Melvill, 1899
- Mitra nigrofasciata G. B. Sowerby II, 1874

== Synonyms ==
- Vexillum albatum Cernohorsky, 1988: synonym of Vexillum castum (H. Adams, 1872): synonym of Pilgrivexillum castum (H. Adams, 1872)
- Vexillum altisuturatum Chino & Herrmann, 2014: synonym of Pilgrivexillum altisuturatum (Chino & Herrmann, 2014)
- Vexillum anabelae (F. Fernandes, 1992): synonym of Pusia anabelae F. Fernandes, 1992
- Vexillum andreiae Gori & Salisbury, 2024: synonym of Pacifilux andreiae (Gori & R. Salisbury, 2024)
- Vexillum apicinctum (Verco, 1896): synonym of Turriplicifer apicitinctus (Verco, 1896)
- Vexillum arestum (Rehder, 1943): synonym of Pusia articulata (Reeve, 1845)
- Vexillum articulatum (Reeve, 1845): synonym of Pusia articulata (Reeve, 1845)
- Vexillum australe (Swainson, 1820): synonym of Turriplicifer australis (Swainson, 1820)
- Vexillum baccheti R. Salisbury & Herrmann, 2012: synonym of Eupusia baccheti (R. Salisbury & Herrmann, 2012)
- Vexillum balutense Herrmann, 2009: synonym of Pusia balutensis (Herrmann, 2009) (basionym)
- Vexillum bilineatum (Reeve, 1845): synonym of Protoelongata bilineata (Reeve, 1845)
- Vexillum blanfordi (Melvill & Standen, 1901): synonym of Volutomitra blanfordi (Melvill & Standen, 1901)
- † Vexillum brevior (Friedberg, 1911): synonym of † Pusia brevior (Friedberg, 1911) (superseded combination)
- Vexillum castum (H. Adams, 1872): synonym of Pilgrivexillum castum (H. Adams, 1872)
- Vexillum catenatum (Broderip, 1836): synonym of Canaripusia catenata (Broderip, 1836)
- Vexillum choslenae Cernohorsky, 1982: synonym of Pusia choslenae (Cernohorsky, 1982)
- Vexillum cinerium [sic]: synonym of Vexillum leucozonias (Deshayes, 1833)
- Vexillum clarum S.-I Huang & M.-H. Lin, 2020: synonym of Eupusia clara (S.-I Huang & M. H. Lin, 2020)
- Vexillum cophinum (Gould, 1850): synonym of Vexillum sculptile (Reeve, 1845)
- Vexillum cordierii C. Maravigna, 1840 : synonym of Pusia ebenus (J.B.P.A. Lamarck, 1811)
- Vexillum costellata J.B.G.M. Bory De Saint-Vincent, 1827 : synonym of Vexillum subdivisum costellaris (J.B.P.A. Lamarck, 1822
- Vexillum crassum (Simone, 1995): synonym of Nodicostellaria crassa (Simone, 1995)
- Vexillum cophinum A.A. Gould, 1850 : synonym of Vexillum sculptile (L.A. Reeve, 1845)
- Vexillum corallinum (Reeve, 1845): synonym of Protoelongata corallina (Reeve, 1845)
- Vexillum cordierii C. Maravigna, 1840 : synonym of Pusia ebenus (J.B.P.A. Lamarck, 1811)
- Vexillum crebriliratum L.A. Reeve, 1844: synonym of Vexillum acuminatum (J.F. Gmelin, 1791)
- Vexillum crispata H.C. Koster, 1840: synonym of Vexillum vulpecula C. Linnaeus, 1758)
- Vexillum cruentatum J.F. Gmelin, 1791: synonym of Vexillum virgo (C. Linnaeus, 1767)
- Vexillum cruzana G.W. Nowell-Usticke, 1959 : synonym of Pusia cubana (Aguayo & Rehder, 1936)
- Vexillum cubanum Aguayo & Rehder, 1936: synonym of Pusia cubana (Aguayo & Rehder, 1936)
- † Vexillum cupressinum (Brocchi 1814): synonym of † Tosapusia cupressina (Brocchi, 1814)
- Vexillum dautzenbergi Poppe, Guillot de Suduiraut & Tagaro, 2006: synonym of Pusia dautzenbergi (Poppe, E. Guillot de Suduiraut & Tagaro, 2006)
- Vexillum decipiens P. Dautzenberg & J.L. Bouge, 1923: synonym of Vexillum hervieri (P. Dautzenberg & J.L. Bouge, 1923)
- Vexillum diamesa R.P.J. Hervier, 1897 : synonym of Vexillum corbicula (G.B. II Sowerby, 1870)
- Vexillum duplex Cernohorsky, 1982: synonym of Tosapusia duplex (Cernohorsky, 1982)
- Vexillum ebenus (Lamarck, 1811): synonym of Pusia ebenus (Lamarck, 1811)
- Vexillum elegans J.H.F. Link, 1807: synonym of Vexillum citrinum (J.F. Gmelin, 1791)
- Vexillum elegantula H.C. Köster, 1839: synonym of Condylomitra tuberosa (Reeve, 1845)
- Vexillum elima C.N. Cate, 1963 ex Dall MS: synonym of Vexillum micra H.A. Pilsbry, 1921
- Vexillum elliscrossi Rosenberg & Salisbury, 1991: synonym of Pusia elliscrossi (Rosenberg & R. Salisbury, 1991)
- Vexillum emiliae (Schmeltz, 1874): synonym of Eupusia emiliae (Schmeltz, 1874)
- Vexillum epiphaneum (Rehder, 1943): synonym of Pusia epiphanea Rehder, 1943
- Vexillum evelynae Guillot de Suduiraut, 2007: synonym of Tosapusia evelyniana (S.-I. Huang, 2017)
- Vexillum exiguum (C. B. Adams, 1845): synonym of Atlantilux exigua (C. B. Adams, 1845)
- Vexillum fasciata W.H. Dall, 1905: synonym of Vexillum taeniatum (J.B.P.A. Lamarck, 1811)
- Vexillum festum (Reeve, 1845): synonym of Orphanopusia festa (Reeve, 1845)
- Vexillum fidis G.B. III Sowerby, 1916: synonym of Vexillum patulum (L.A. Reeve, 1845)
- Vexillum filiareginae (J. Cate, 1961): synonym of Vexillum coloscopulus J. M. Cate, 1961
- Vexillum fulvosulcatum (Melvill, 1888): synonym of Vexillum infaustum (Reeve, 1845)
- † Vexillum fusellinum (Lamarck, 1803): synonym of † Conomitra fusellina (Lamarck, 1803)
- Vexillum gemmatum (Sowerby II, 1874): synonym of Atlantilux gemmata (G. B. Sowerby II, 1874)
- Vexillum geoffreyanum (J.C. Melvill, 1910): synonym of Volutomitra geoffreyana (Melvill, 1910)
- Vexillum geronimae Poppe, Tagaro & Salisbury, 2009: synonym of Eupusia geronimae (Poppe, Tagaro & R. Salisbury, 2009)
- Vexillum gervilli B.C.M. Payraudeau, 1827: synonym of Pusia ebenus (J.B.P.A. Lamarck, 1811)
- Vexillum glandiformis L.A. Reeve, 1845: synonym of Vexillum oniscinum (J.B.P.A. Lamarck, 1811)
- Vexillum gloriosum Noodt, 1819: synonym of Vexillum taeniatum (Lamarck, 1811)
- Vexillum granosum (Gmelin, 1791): synonym of Vexillum sanguisuga (Linnaeus, 1758) (junior subjective synonym)
- Vexillum granum (Forbes, 1844): synonym of Pusia granum (Forbes, 1844)
- Vexillum hadfieldi (Melvill & Standen, 1895): synonym of Vexillum exasperatum (Gmelin, 1791)
- Vexillum haifensis F. Nordsieck, 198: synonym of Pusia hypatiae (P.M. Pallary, 1912)
- Vexillum hanleyi (Dohrn, 1861): synonym of Atlantilux exigua (C. B. Adams, 1845)
- Vexillum hansenae Cernohorsky, 1973: synonym of Pusia hansenae (Cernohorsky, 1973)
- Vexillum harpiferum J.B.P.A. Lamarck, 1811: synonym of Vexillum virgo (C. Linnaeus, 1767)
- † Vexillum hastatum (D.L.G. Karsten, 1849): synonym of † Pusia hastata (Karsten, 1849)
- Vexillum heleneae Herrmann, Stossier & R. Salisbury, 2014: synonym of Protoelongata heleneae (Herrmann, Stossier & R. Salisbury, 2014) (original combination)
- Vexillum hedleyi R. Murdoch, 1905 : synonym of Peculator hedleyi (R. Murdoch, 1905)
- Vexillum hendersoni (Dall, 1927): synonym of Pusia hendersoni (Dall, 1927)
- Vexillum hirasei (Kira, 1962): synonym of Vexillum japonicum A. Adams, 1864
- Vexillum histrio (Reeve, 1844): synonym of Pusia histrio (Reeve, 1844)
- Vexillum hypatiae (Pallary, 1913): synonym of Pusia hypatiae (P.M. Pallary, 1912)
- Vexillum inerme (Reeve, 1845): synonym of Eupusia inermis (Reeve, 1845)
- Vexillum isaoi (Kuroda & Sakurai, 1959): synonym of Tosapusia isaoi (Kuroda & Sakurai, 1959)
- Vexillum joliveti Poppe & Tagaro, 2006: synonym of Costapex joliveti (Poppe & Tagaro, 2006) (basionym)
- Vexillum kaicherae (Petuch, 1979): synonym of Nodicostellaria kaicherae (Petuch, 1979)
- Vexillum klytios Turner, 2008: synonym of Eupusia klytios (H. Turner, 2008)
- Vexillum kremerae (Petuch, 1987): synonym of Nodicostellaria kremerae Petuch, 1987
- Vexillum kurodai (Sakurai & Habe, 1964): synonym of Tosapusia isaoi (Kuroda & Sakurai, 1959)
- Vexillum lanulentum S.-I. Huang, 2017: synonym of Eupusia lanulenta (S.-I Huang, 2017)
- Vexillum lautum (Reeve, 1845): synonym of Pusia lauta (Reeve, 1845)
- Vexillum leonardhilli (Petuch, 1987): synonym of Turricostellaria leonardhilli Petuch, 1987
- Vexillum laterculatum (Sowerby II & Sowerby III, 1874): synonym of Nodicostellaria laterculata (G. B. Sowerby II, 1874)
- Vexillum leucaspis Herrmann & Stossier, 2011: synonym of Ebenomitra leucaspis (Herrmann & Stossier, 2011)
- † Vexillum leucozona (Andrzejowski, 1830): synonym of † Ebenomitra leucozona (Andrzejowski, 1830)
- Vexillum lincolnense (Angas, 1878): synonym of Austromitra lincolnensis (Angas, 1878)
- Vexillum lindae (Petuch, 1987): synonym of Turricostellaria lindae Petuch, 1987
- Vexillum loyaltyense (Hervier, 1897): synonym of Protoelongata loyaltyensis (Hervier, 1897)
- Vexillum lubens (Reeve, 1845): synonym of Vexillum modestum (Reeve, 1845)
- Vexillum macrospirum (A. Adams, 1853): synonym of Vexillum macrospira (A. Adams, 1853) (misspelling)
- Vexillum marrowi Cernohorsky, 1973: synonym of Pusia marrowi (Cernohorsky, 1973) (original combination)
- † Vexillum martini (Icke & K. Martin, 1907): synonym of † Vexillum dahanaensis (Vlerk, 1931)
- Vexillum martinorum Cernohorsky, 1986: synonym of Costapex martinorum (Cernohorsky, 1986)
- Vexillum marrowi Cernohorsky, 1973: synonym of Thaluta maxmarrowi (Cernohorsky, 1980)
- Vexillum microzonias (Lamarck, 1811): synonym of Pusia microzonias (Lamarck, 1811)
- Vexillum militaris (Reeve, 1845): synonym of Vexillum militare (Reeve, 1845) (incorrect gender ending)
- Vexillum moniliferum (C. B. Adams, 1850): synonym of Pusia monilifera (C. B. Adams, 1850)
- Vexillum nigritella (Bartsch, 1918): synonym of Vexillum exaratum (A. Adams, 1853) (synonym)
- Vexillum nitidissimum (Melvill & Standen, 1895): synonym of Ponderiola nitidissima (Melvill & Standen, 1895)
- Vexillum nodospiculum (Cernohorsky, 1970): synonym of Atlantilux nodospicula (Cernohorsky, 1970)
- Vexillum osiridis (Issel, 1869): synonym of Orphanopusia osiridis (Issel, 1869)
- Vexillum pailoloanum J. M. Cate, 1963 : synonym of Volutomitra pailoloana (J. M. Cate, 1963)
- Vexillum pardale (Küster, 1840): synonym of Eupusia pardalis (Küster, 1840)
- † Vexillum parki R. S. Allan, 1926 : synonym of † Proximitra parki (R. S. Allan, 1926)
- Vexillum patriarchalis (Gmelin, 1791): synonym of Orphanopusia patriarchalis (Gmelin, 1791)
- Vexillum pharaonis (Issel, 1869): synonym of Vexillum cadaverosum (Reeve, 1844)
- † Vexillum plicatellum P. Marshall & Murdoch, 1923: synonym of † Peculator plicatellus (P. Marshall & Murdoch, 1923)
- Vexillum plicatum Röding, 1798: synonym of Vexillum plicarium (Linnaeus, 1758)
- Vexillum politum (Reeve, 1844): synonym of Vexillum acuminatum (Gmelin, 1791)
- Vexillum pratasense T.C. Lan, 2004: synonym of Tosapusia duplex (Cernohorsky, 1982)
- Vexillum pseudomarginatum Suter, 1913: synonym of Austromitra rubiginosa (F. W. Hutton, 1873)
- Vexillum puella (Reeve, 1845): synonym of Atlantilux puella (Reeve, 1845)
- Vexillum pulchellum (Reeve, 1844): synonym of Pusia pulchella (Reeve, 1844)
- Vexillum pullatum (Reeve, 1844): synonym of Vexillum plicarium (Linnaeus, 1758)
- Vexillum pumilio May, 1916: synonym of Austromitra schomburgki (Angas, 1878)
- Vexillum puncturatum (Sowerby III, 1879): synonym of Vexillum zebuense (Reeve, 1844)
- Vexillum rectilateralis (G. B. Sowerby II, 1874): synonym of Vexillum suluense (A. Adams & Reeve, 1850)
- Vexillum rhodarion Kilburn, 1972(original combination): synonym of Austromitra rhodarion (Kilburn, 1972)
- Vexillum rhodochroa (Hervier, 1897): synonym of Atlantilux rubra (Broderip, 1836)
- Vexillum ronnyi Poppe, Tagaro & Salisbury, 2009: synonym of Costapex ronnyi (Poppe, Tagaro & R. Salisbury, 2009)
- Vexillum roris S.-I Huang & M.-H. Lin, 2020: synonym of Eupusia roris (S.-I Huang & M. H. Lin, 2020)
- Vexillum rubrotaeniatum Herrmann, Stossier & R. Salisbury, 2014 (original combination): synonym of Protoelongata rubrotaeniata (Herrmann, Stossier & R. Salisbury, 2014)
- Vexillum rubrum (Broderip, 1836): synonym of Atlantilux rubra (Broderip, 1836)
- Vexillum rufobalteatum (Hervier, 1897): synonym of Vexillum turriger (Reeve, 1845)
- † Vexillum rutidolomum Suter, 1917: synonym of † Proximitra rutidoloma (Suter, 1917)
- Vexillum sagamiense (Kuroda & Habe, 1971): synonym of Vexillum castum (H. Adams, 1872)
- Vexillum sanguisugum [sic]: misspelling of Vexillum sanguisuga (Linnaeus, 1758)
- Vexillum sauternesense Guillot de Suduiraut, 1997: synonym of Tosapusia sauternesensis (E. Guillot de Suduiraut, 1997)
- Vexillum savignyi (Payraudeau, 1826): synonym of Pusia savignyi (Payraudeau, 1826)
- Vexillum semicostatum (Anton, 1838): synonym of Eupusia semicostata (Anton, 1838)
- Vexillum seroi T. Cossignani, 2022: synonym of Vexillum buriasense (Tomlin, 1920)
- Vexillum stephanucha (Melvill, 1897): synonym of Vexillum stephanuchum (Melvill, 1897) (incorrect gender ending)
- Vexillum strictecostatum (von Maltzan, 1884): synonym of Ebenomitra strictecostata (Maltzan, 1884)
- Vexillum styria (Dall, 1889): synonym of Caribbonus styria (Dall, 1889)
- Vexillum suave (Sowerby, 1875): synonym of Vexillum exquisitum (Garrett, 1873)
- Vexillum superbum Röding, 1798: synonym of Vexillum vulpecula (Linnaeus, 1758) (junior subjective synonym)
- † Vexillum suteri Finlay, 1924: synonym of † Proximitra enysi (Hutton, 1873)
- † Vexillum svagrovskyi Biskupič, 2020: synonym of † Tosapusia neudorfensis (Schaffer, 1898)
- Vexillum sykesi (Melvill, 1925): synonym of Atlantilux sykesi (Melvill, 1925)
- Vexillum takisaoi [sic]: synonym of Neocancilla takiisaoi (Kuroda, 1959) (misspelling)
- † Vexillum teschi (Koperberg, 1931): synonym of † Turricula (Costellaria) rumphiusi Rutsch, 1932
- Vexillum thorssoni Poppe, Guillot de Suduiraut & Tagaro, 2006: synonym of Protoelongata thorssoni (Poppe, E. Guillot de Suduiraut & Tagaro, 2006)
- Vexillum tricolor (Gmelin, 1791): synonym of Pusia tricolor (Gmelin, 1791)
- Vexillum trophonium (Dall, 1889): synonym of Pusia trophonia (Dall, 1889)
- Vexillum tuberosum (Reeve, 1845): synonym of Condylomitra tuberosa (Reeve, 1845)
- Vexillum tulearense T. Cossignani, 2021: synonym of Vexillum regina (G. B. Sowerby I, 1828)
- Vexillum turrigerum [sic]: misspelling of Vexillum turriger (Reeve, 1845)
- Vexillum variatum (Reeve, 1845): synonym of Pusia variata (Reeve, 1845)
- Vexillum venustulum (Reeve, 1844): synonym of Vexillum unifasciale (Lamarck, 1811)
- Vexillum venustum (Sarasúa, 1978): synonym of Vexillum pulchellum (Reeve, 1844)
- Vexillum vicmanoui Turner & Marrow, 2001: synonym of Pusia vicmanoui (H. Turner & Marrow, 2001)
- Vexillum virginalis (Lesson, 1842): synonym of Vexillum virginale (Lesson, 1842)
- Vexillum vittatum (Swainson, 1821): synonym of Vexillum taeniatum (Lamarck, 1811)
- Vexillum vulpeculum [sic]: synonym of Vexillum vulpecula (Linnaeus, 1758)
- Vexillum waitei Suter, 1909: synonym of Egestas waitei (Suter, 1909)
- Vexillum wandoense (Holmes, 1859): synonym of Caribbonus wandoensis (F. S. Holmes, 1860)
- Vexillum weberi (Bartsch, 1918): synonym of Vexillum rugosum (Gmelin, 1791)
- Vexillum xerampelinum (Melvill, 1895): synonym of Protoelongata xerampelina (Melvill, 1895)
- Vexillum zebrinum (d'Orbigny in Webb & Berthelot, 1839): synonym of Pusia zebrina (d'Orbigny, 1840)
- Vexillum zythochroa (Melvill, 1888): synonym of Vexillum catenatum (Broderip, 1836)
