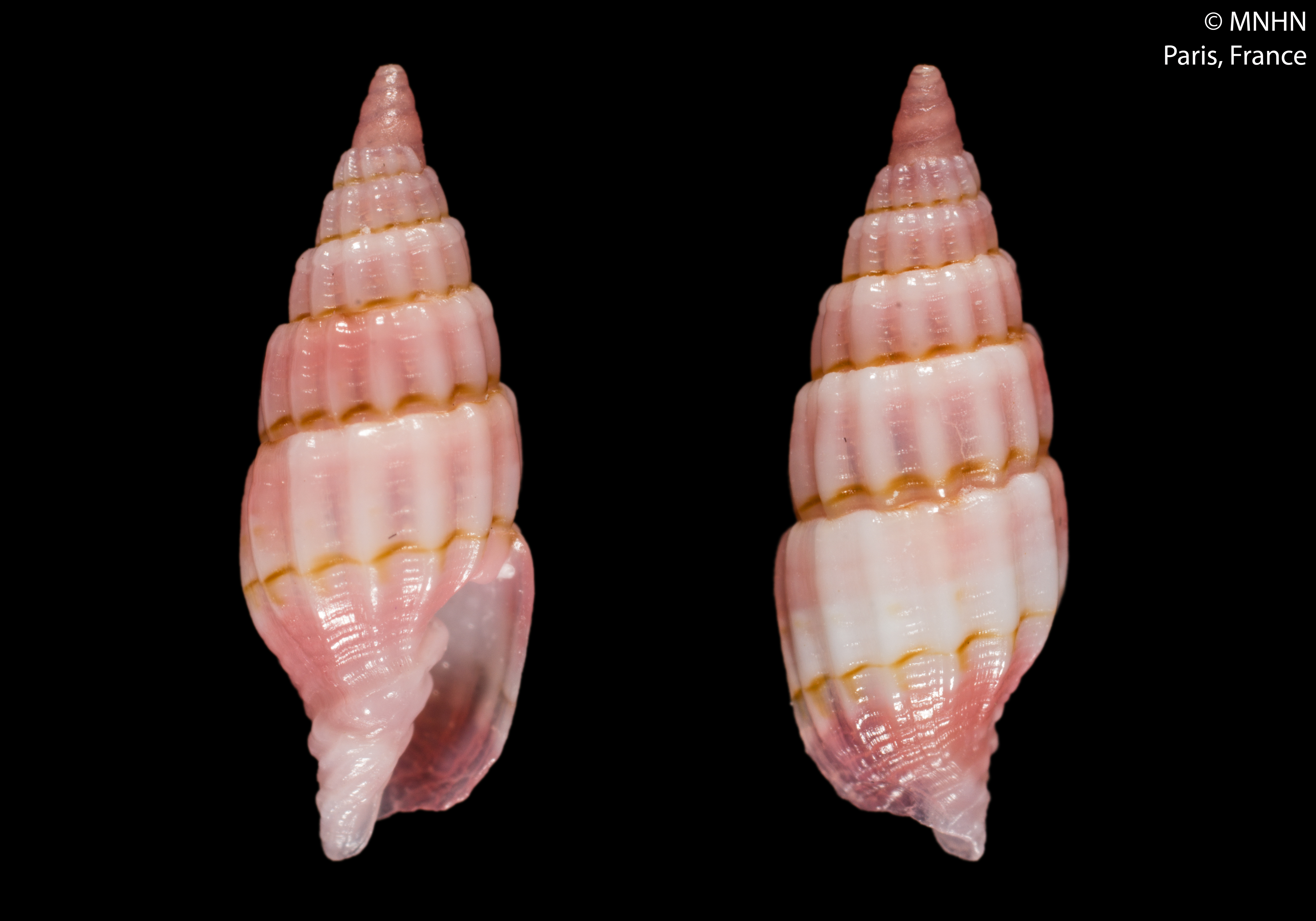
- Shell of Vexillum derkai (holotype at MNHN, Paris)

Scientific classification
- Kingdom: Animalia
- Phylum: Mollusca
- Class: Gastropoda
- Subclass: Caenogastropoda
- Order: Neogastropoda
- Superfamily: Turbinelloidea
- Family: Costellariidae
- Genus: Vexillum
- Species: V. derkai

Binomial name
- Vexillum derkai Herrmann, 2012

Synonyms
- Pusia derkai (M. Herrmann, 2012); Vexillum (Pusia) derkai Herrmann, 2012

= Vexillum derkai =

Species of gastropod

Vexillum derkai is a species of sea snail, a marine gastropod mollusk, belonging to the family Costellariidae, commonly known as the ribbed miters.

== Description ==
The length of the shell attains 8 mm.

== Distribution ==
This marine species occurs in French Polynesia.
