= Vexillum huangorum =

Scientific classification
- Kingdom: Animalia
- Phylum: Mollusca
- Class: Gastropoda
- Subclass: Caenogastropoda
- Order: Neogastropoda
- Superfamily: Turbinelloidea
- Family: Costellariidae
- Genus: Vexillum
- Species: V. huangorum

Binomial name
- Vexillum huangorum Salisbury & Gori, 2012

Synonyms
- Vexillum (Costellaria) huangorum Salisbury & Gori, 2012

Species of gastropod

Vexillum huangorum is a species of sea snail, a marine gastropod mollusk, in the family Costellariidae, the ribbed miters.

== Distribution ==
This marine species occurs off the Philippines and Taiwan.
