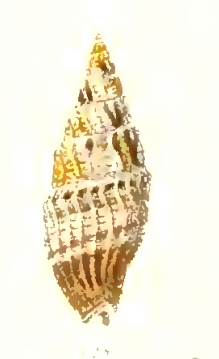
- Shell of Vexillum concentricum (holotype)

Scientific classification
- Kingdom: Animalia
- Phylum: Mollusca
- Class: Gastropoda
- Subclass: Caenogastropoda
- Order: Neogastropoda
- Superfamily: Turbinelloidea
- Family: Costellariidae
- Genus: Vexillum
- Species: V. concentricum

Binomial name
- Vexillum concentricum (Reeve, 1844)

Synonyms
- Mitra (Costellaria) stephanucha var. astephana Melvill, 1904 d; Mitra concentrica Reeve, 1844 ·; Vexillum (Costellaria) concentricum (Reeve, 1844); Vexillum (Costellaria) echinatum astephana (Melvill, 1904)

= Vexillum concentricum =

Species of gastropod

Vexillum concentricum is a species of small sea snail, marine gastropod mollusk in the family Costellariidae, the ribbed miters.

== Description ==
It has a shell size of 15 to 32.6 mm.

(Original description) The shell is acuminately ovate, somewhat fusiform. It is longitudinally concentrically ribbed, the ribs pointed at the upper part, interstices impressly striated. The shell is whitish, stained here and therewith spots of rusty brown, with a broad band round the base. The columella is five-plaited. The interior of the aperture is striated.

== Distribution ==
This marine species occurs in the Indo-West Pacific; also in the Red Sea and off Australia (Queensland).
