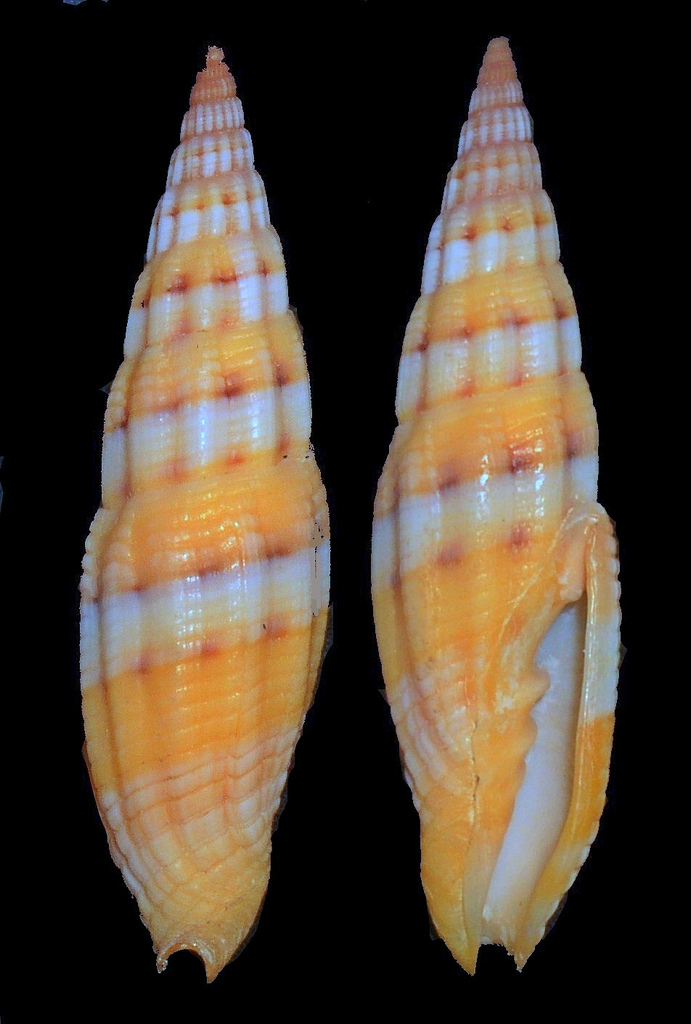
- Vexillum (Vexillum) dennisoni

Scientific classification
- Kingdom: Animalia
- Phylum: Mollusca
- Class: Gastropoda
- Subclass: Caenogastropoda
- Order: Neogastropoda
- Superfamily: Turbinelloidea
- Family: Costellariidae
- Genus: Vexillum
- Species: V. dennisoni

Binomial name
- Vexillum dennisoni (Reeve, 1844)

Synonyms
- Mitra dennisoni Reeve, 1844; Vexillum (Vexillum) dennisoni (Reeve, 1844)

= Vexillum dennisoni =

Species of gastropod

Vexillum dennisoni, common name : the Dennison's mitre, is a species of small sea snail, marine gastropod mollusk in the family Costellariidae, the ribbed miters.

== Description ==
The shell length of the Vexillum dennisoni varies between 40 mm and 66 mm.

(Original description) The shell is fusiform. The spire is attenuately acuminated. The whorls are somewhat concentrically ribbed, transversely grooved. The grooves are narrow, more or less obsolete upon the ribs. The shell is reddish orange, encircled with a single white zone, peculiarly stained with blueish olive between the ribs. The columella is four-plaited.

== Distribution ==
This species occurs in the seas along India and the Philippines.
