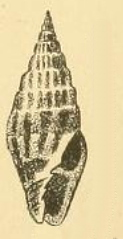
- Drawing of a shell of Vexillum caloxestum (holotype)

Scientific classification
- Kingdom: Animalia
- Phylum: Mollusca
- Class: Gastropoda
- Subclass: Caenogastropoda
- Order: Neogastropoda
- Superfamily: Turbinelloidea
- Family: Costellariidae
- Genus: Vexillum
- Species: V. caloxestum

Binomial name
- Vexillum caloxestum (Melvill, 1888)

Synonyms
- Mitra caloxesta Melvill, 1888 (original combination); Vexillum (Pusia) calotextum [sic] (misspelling)

= Vexillum caloxestum =

Species of gastropod

Vexillum caloxestum is a species of small sea snail, marine gastropod mollusk in the family Costellariidae, the ribbed miters.

== Description ==
The length of the shell attains 16 mm, its diameter 6 mm.

(Original description) The shell is obovate-fusiform. The pointed spire is turreted. The whorls are somewhat rounded above and sparingly plicate at the ribs. The interstices are pointed and striate. The colour of the shell is olive-green and lead. The body whorl is decorated with a narrow white band. The columella is four-plaited. The aperture is very dark within.

== Distribution ==
This marine species occurs off the Andaman Islands.
