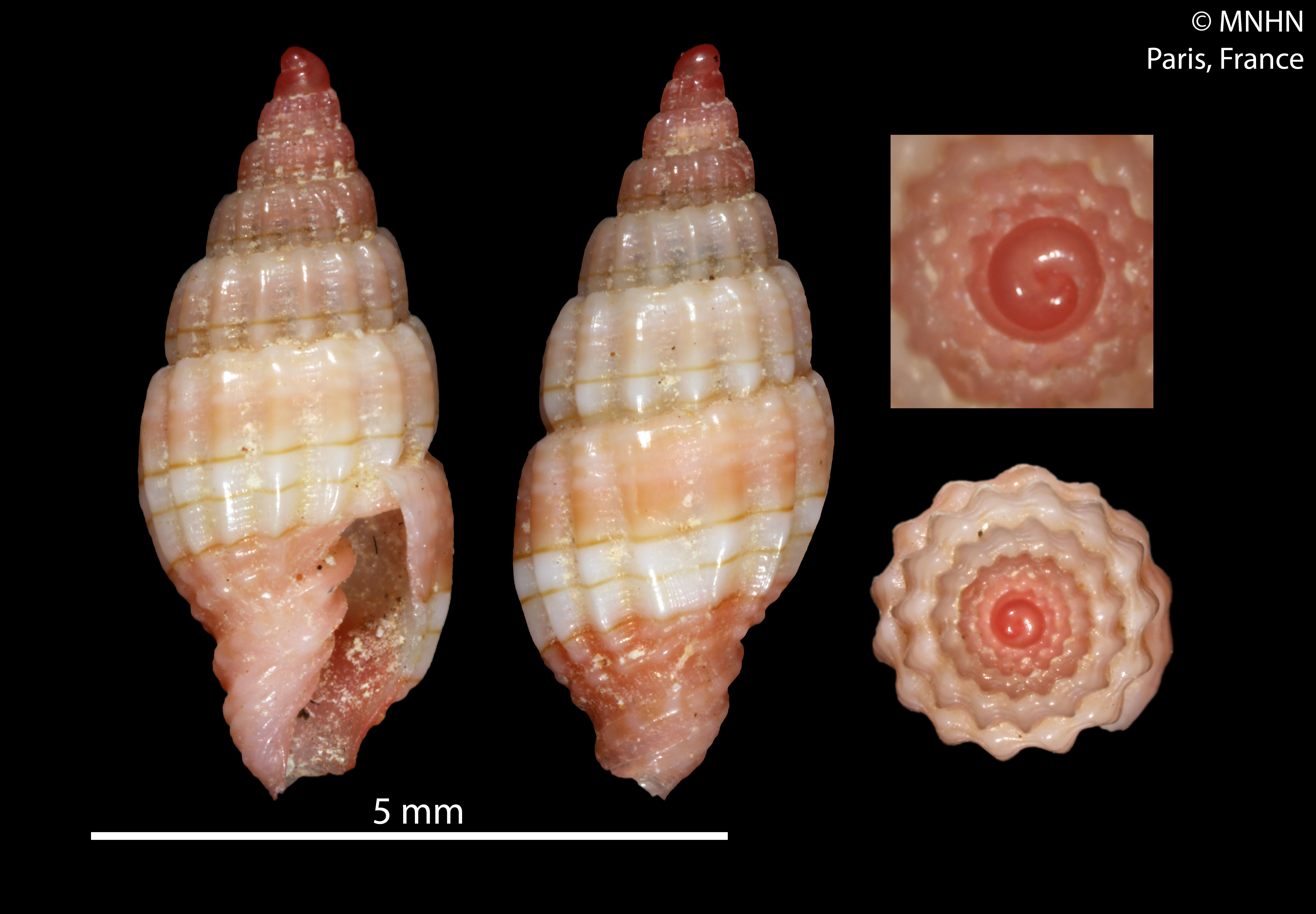
- Shell of Vexillum trilineatum (paratype at MNHN, Paris)

Scientific classification
- Kingdom: Animalia
- Phylum: Mollusca
- Class: Gastropoda
- Subclass: Caenogastropoda
- Order: Neogastropoda
- Superfamily: Turbinelloidea
- Family: Costellariidae
- Genus: Vexillum
- Species: V. trilineatum

Binomial name
- Vexillum trilineatum Herrmann & Stossier, 2011

Synonyms
- Pusia trilineatum M. Herrmann & G. Stossier, 2011; Vexillum (Pusia) trilineatum Herrmann & Stossier, 2011

= Vexillum trilineatum =

Species of sea snail

Vexillum trilineatum is a species of sea snail, a marine gastropod mollusk, in the family Costellariidae, the ribbed miters.

== Description ==
The length of the shell attains 6 mm.

== Distribution ==
This marine species occurs off the Philippines.
