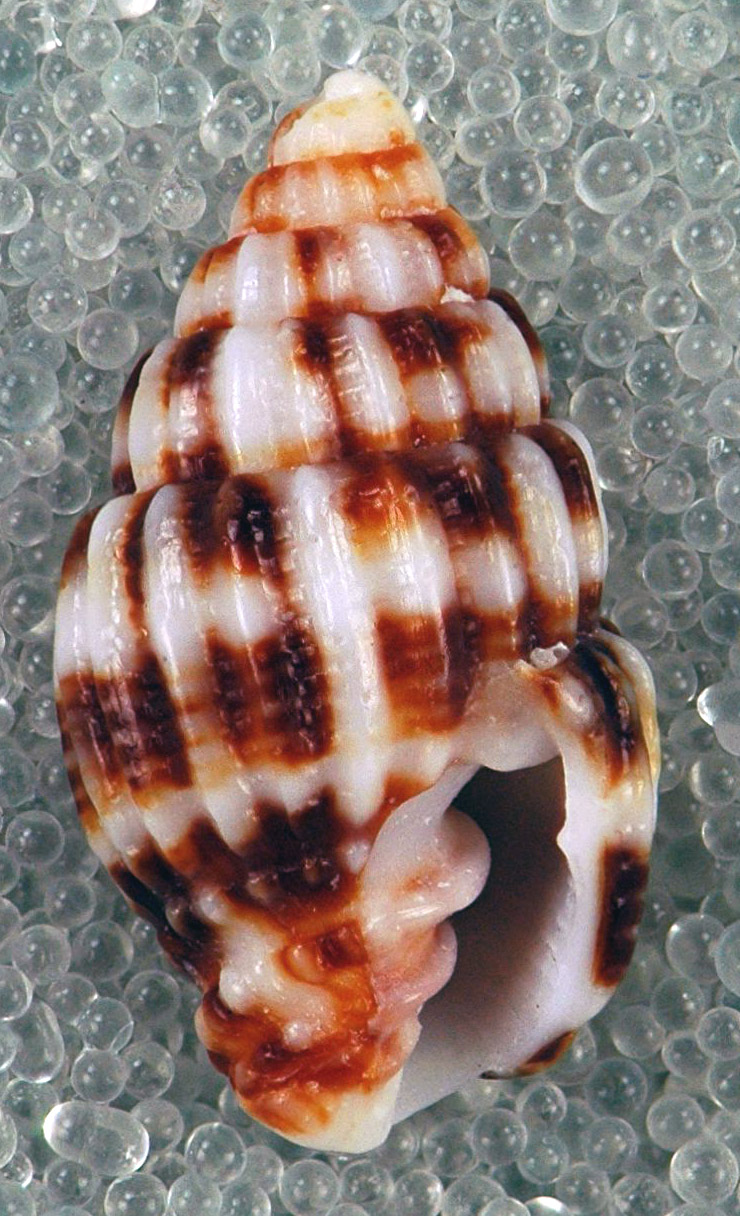

Scientific classification
- Kingdom: Animalia
- Phylum: Mollusca
- Class: Gastropoda
- Subclass: Caenogastropoda
- Order: Neogastropoda
- Superfamily: Turbinelloidea
- Family: Costellariidae
- Genus: Vexillum
- Species: V. dermestinum

Binomial name
- Vexillum dermestinum (Lamarck, 1811)

Synonyms
- Mitra albicostata C. B. Adams, 1850; Mitra dermestina Lamarck, 1811 · unaccepted (original combination); Vexillum (Pusia) dermestinum (Lamarck, 1811) ·

= Vexillum dermestinum =

Species of gastropod

Vexillum dermestinum is a species of small sea snail, marine gastropod mollusk in the family Costellariidae, the ribbed miters.

== Description ==
(Described as Mitra albicostata) The fusiform shell is dark brown or reddish brown, with whitish ribs, with a spiral band of a darker shade of the same, which is scarcely interrupted on the ribs, and a spiral white band which commences on the body whorl near the summit of the aperture. The shell is covered with obtuse longitudinal ribs, about IG on each whorl, which are nearly obsolete in a broad shallow groove near the anterior extremity. They are crossed by spiral striae in the intercostal paces, and a few spiral raised nodulous lines anteriorly, of which the larger is continuous with the upper columellar plait. The apex is obtuse, while the spire has the outlines quite convex. The shell contains six whorls, moderately convex, with a well impressed suture. The aperture is narrow. The columella contains four plaits, of which the two lower are small and approximate, and the two upper are large and distant.

== Distribution ==
This marine species occurs off Jamaica and Bermuda.
