= Vexillum rodgersi =

Scientific classification
- Kingdom: Animalia
- Phylum: Mollusca
- Class: Gastropoda
- Subclass: Caenogastropoda
- Order: Neogastropoda
- Superfamily: Turbinelloidea
- Family: Costellariidae
- Genus: Vexillum
- Species: V. rodgersi

Binomial name
- Vexillum rodgersi Salisbury & Wolff, 2005

Synonyms
- Vexillum (Costellaria) rodgersi R. Salisbury & Wolff, 2005 ·

Species of gastropod

Vexillum rodgersi is a species of small sea snail, marine gastropod mollusk in the family Costellariidae, the ribbed miters.

== Description ==
The length of the shell attains 25 mm.

== Distribution ==
This marine species occurs off Mozambique, the Philippines and off Guam.
