= Vexillum yvesfineti =

Scientific classification
- Kingdom: Animalia
- Phylum: Mollusca
- Class: Gastropoda
- Subclass: Caenogastropoda
- Order: Neogastropoda
- Superfamily: Turbinelloidea
- Family: Costellariidae
- Genus: Vexillum
- Species: V. yvesfineti

Binomial name
- Vexillum yvesfineti T. Cossignani & V. Cossignani, 2021

Species of gastropod

Vexillum yvesfineti is a species of sea snail, a marine gastropod mollusk, in the family Costellariidae, the ribbed miters.

== Distribution ==
This marine species occurs off Vietnam.
