= Vexillum innocens =

Scientific classification
- Kingdom: Animalia
- Phylum: Mollusca
- Class: Gastropoda
- Subclass: Caenogastropoda
- Order: Neogastropoda
- Superfamily: Turbinelloidea
- Family: Costellariidae
- Genus: Vexillum
- Species: V. innocens

Binomial name
- Vexillum innocens (Thiele, 1925)

Synonyms
- Turricula (Costellaria) innocens Thiele, 1925 (basionym); Turricula innocens Thiele, 1925 (original combination); Vexillum (Costellaria) innocens (Thiele, 1925) ·

Species of gastropod

Vexillum innocens is a species of small sea snail, marine gastropod mollusk in the family Costellariidae, the ribbed miters.

== Distribution ==
This species occurs in the Indian Ocean off Somalia.
