= Vexillum sneidari =

Scientific classification
- Kingdom: Animalia
- Phylum: Mollusca
- Class: Gastropoda
- Subclass: Caenogastropoda
- Order: Neogastropoda
- Superfamily: Turbinelloidea
- Family: Costellariidae
- Genus: Vexillum
- Species: V. sneidari

Binomial name
- Vexillum sneidari Salisbury, 2011

Synonyms
- Vexillum (Costellaria) sneidari Salisbury, 2011

Species of gastropod

Vexillum sneidari is a species of sea snail, a marine gastropod mollusk, in the family Costellariidae, the ribbed miters.

== Description ==
The length of the shell attains 15 mm.

Its shell contains white with varying brown tones.

== Distribution ==
This marine species occurs off Hawaii.
