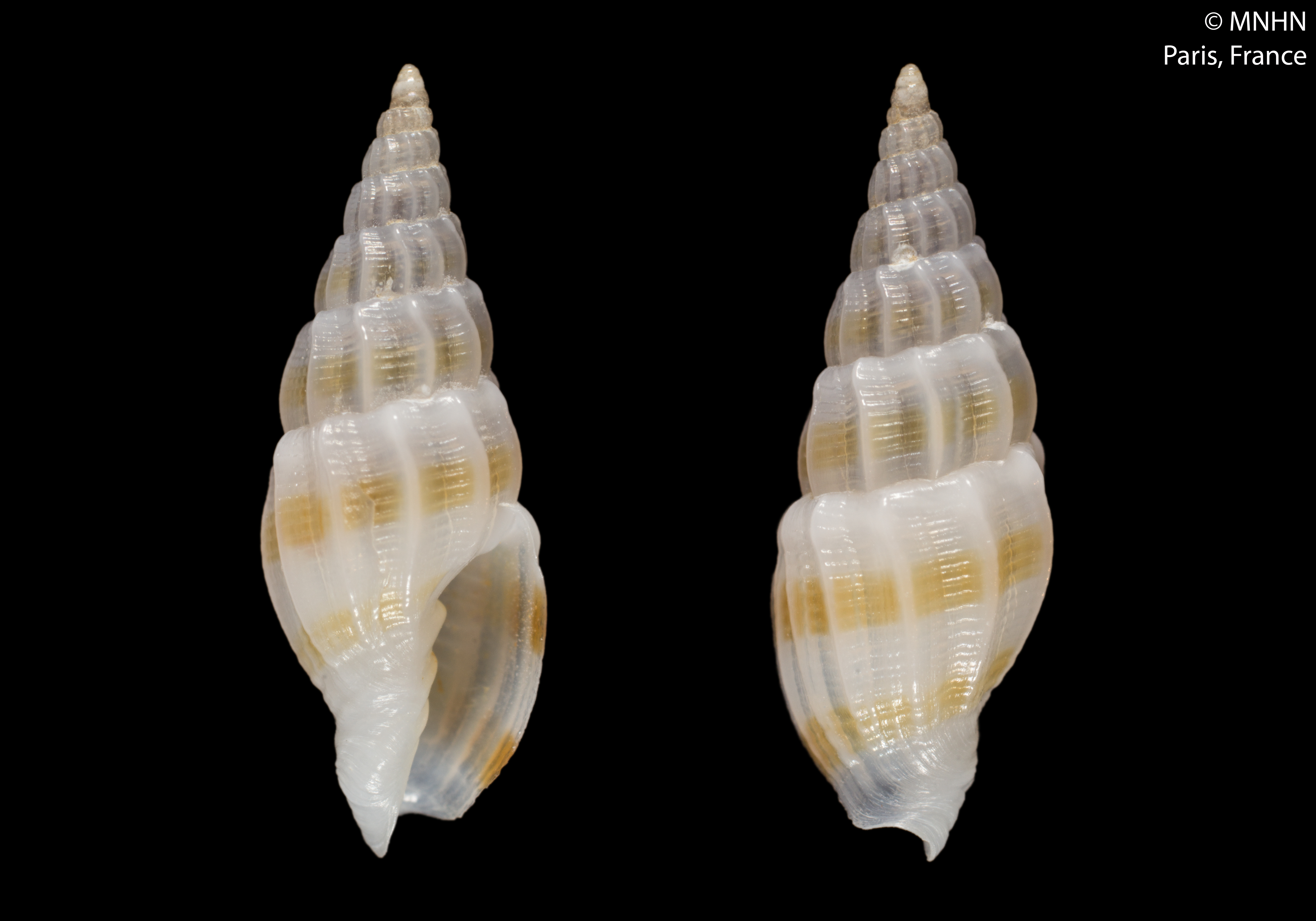
- Shell of Vexillum fuscovirgatum (holotype at MNHN, Paris)

Scientific classification
- Kingdom: Animalia
- Phylum: Mollusca
- Class: Gastropoda
- Subclass: Caenogastropoda
- Order: Neogastropoda
- Superfamily: Turbinelloidea
- Family: Costellariidae
- Genus: Vexillum
- Species: V. fuscovirgatum

Binomial name
- Vexillum fuscovirgatum Herrmann & Salisbury, 2012

Synonyms
- Costellaria fuscovirgatum M. Herrmann & R. Salisbury, 2012; Vexillum (Costellaria) fuscovirgatum Herrmann & Salisbury, 2012

= Vexillum fuscovirgatum =

Species of gastropod

Vexillum fuscovirgatum is a species of sea snail, a marine gastropod mollusk, in the family Costellariidae, the ribbed miters.

== Distribution ==
This marine species occurs off French Polynesia.
