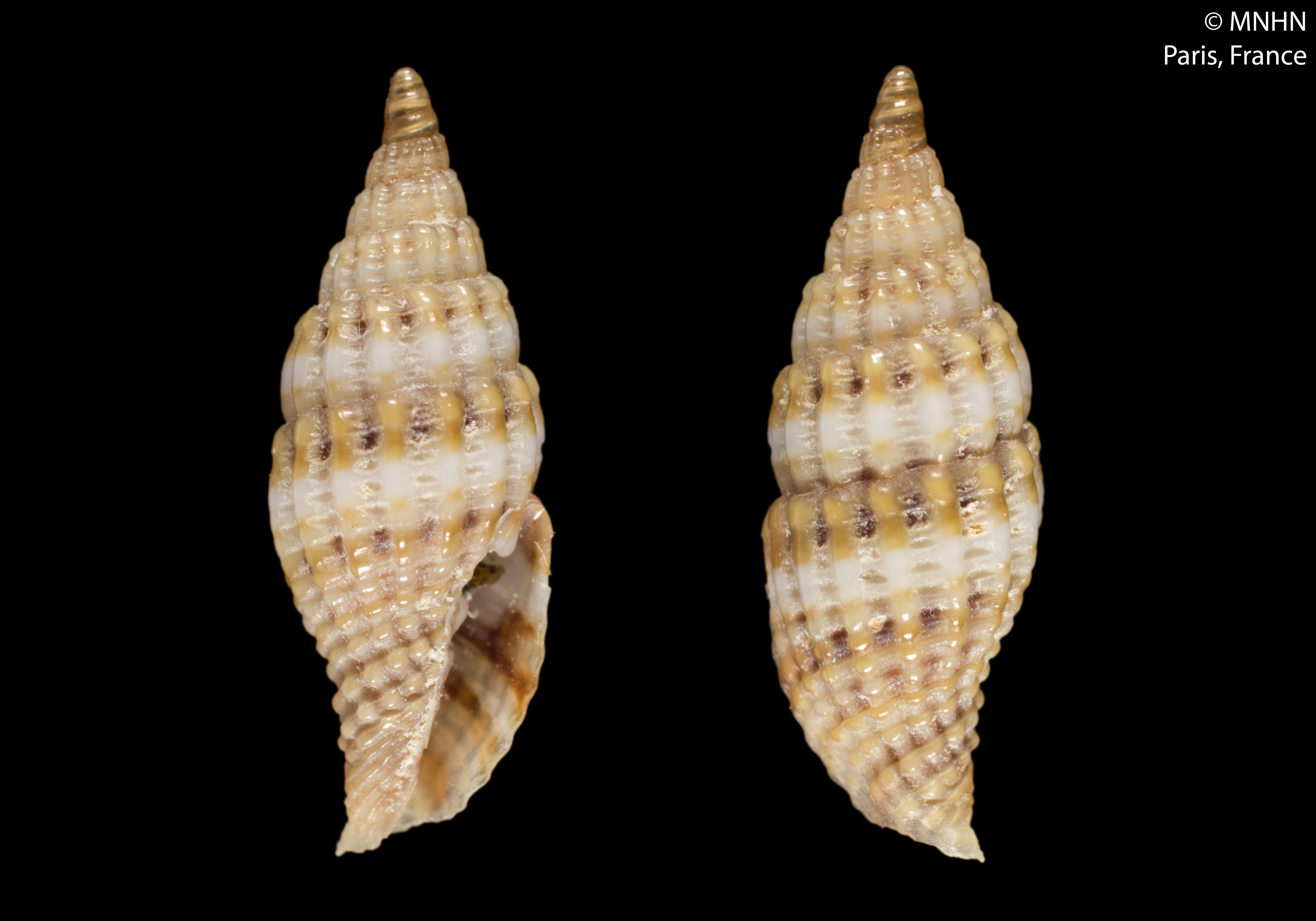
- Shell of Vexillum herosae (holotype at MNHN, Paris)

Scientific classification
- Kingdom: Animalia
- Phylum: Mollusca
- Class: Gastropoda
- Subclass: Caenogastropoda
- Order: Neogastropoda
- Superfamily: Turbinelloidea
- Family: Costellariidae
- Genus: Vexillum
- Species: V. herosae

Binomial name
- Vexillum herosae Herrmann & Salisbury, 2012

Synonyms
- Vexillum (Pusia) herosae Herrmann & Salisbury, 2012

= Vexillum herosae =

Species of gastropod

Vexillum herosae is a species of sea snail, a marine gastropod mollusk, in the family Costellariidae, the ribbed miters.
