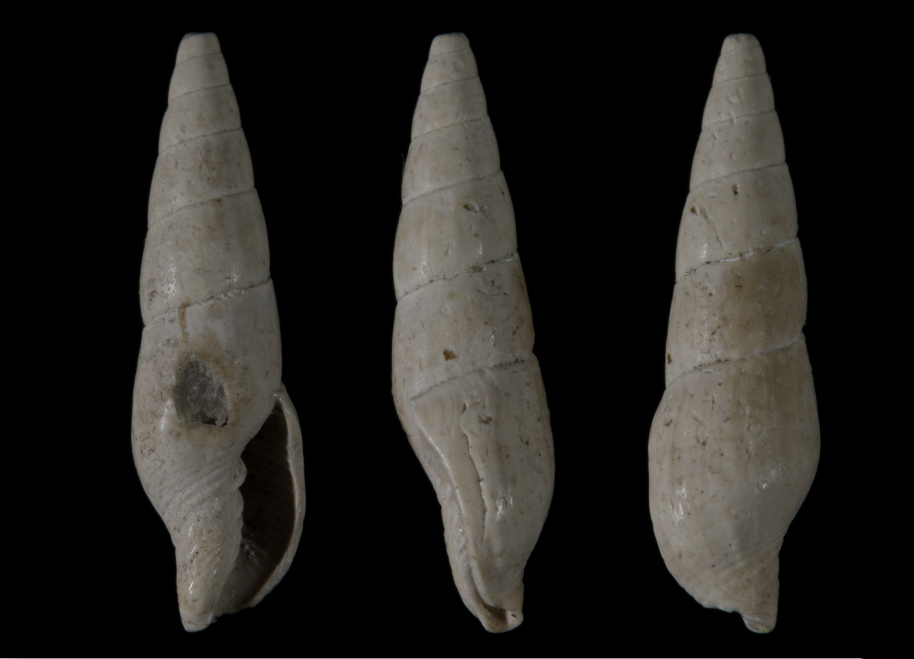
- Shell of Vexillum terebellum (specimen at MNHN, Paris)

Scientific classification
- Kingdom: Animalia
- Phylum: Mollusca
- Class: Gastropoda
- Subclass: Caenogastropoda
- Order: Neogastropoda
- Superfamily: Turbinelloidea
- Family: Costellariidae
- Genus: Vexillum
- Species: †V. terebellum

Binomial name
- †Vexillum terebellum (Lamarck, 1803)

Synonyms
- † Mitra terebellum Lamarck, 1803superseded combination; † Turricula (Fusimitra) terebellum (Lamarck, 1803); † Vexillum (Uromitra) terebellum (Lamarck, 1803) superseded combination

= Vexillum terebellum =

Species of gastropod

Vexillum terebellum is an extinct species of sea snail, a marine gastropod mollusk, in the family Costellariidae, the ribbed miters. The length of the shell can reach 13 mm.

== Distribution ==
Fossils of this marine species were found in Eocene strata in Ile-de-France, France.
