= Vexillum purpuratum =

Scientific classification
- Kingdom: Animalia
- Phylum: Mollusca
- Class: Gastropoda
- Subclass: Caenogastropoda
- Order: Neogastropoda
- Family: Costellariidae
- Genus: Vexillum
- Species: V. purpuratum

Binomial name
- Vexillum purpuratum (Reeve, 1845)

Synonyms
- Mitra purpurata Reeve, 1845 · unaccepted (original combination); Pusia purpuratum (Reeve, 1845); Vexillum (Pusia) purpuratum (Reeve, 1845)

Species of gastropod

Vexillum purpuratum, common name the purple-tinged mitre, is a species of small sea snail, marine gastropod mollusk in the family Costellariidae, the ribbed miters.

== Description ==
The length of the shell attains 7 mm.

(Original description) The ovate shell is attenuated at both ends. The spire is rather short and somewhat turreted. The whorls are flatly angulated at the sutures, longitudinally ribbed with numerous ribs, narrow and prominent. The interstices are impressly cancellated. The shell is brownish-purple, encircled with a narrow white zone. The columella is four-plaited.

== Distribution ==
This marine species occurs off the Philippines, Japan, Guam and Fiji Islands.
