= Vexillum tumidum =

Scientific classification
- Kingdom: Animalia
- Phylum: Mollusca
- Class: Gastropoda
- Subclass: Caenogastropoda
- Order: Neogastropoda
- Family: Costellariidae
- Genus: Vexillum
- Species: V. tumidum

Binomial name
- Vexillum tumidum (Reeve, 1844)

Synonyms
- Mitra tumida Reeve, 1844 (original combination); Vexillum (Vexillum) tumidum (Reeve, 1844) ·

Species of sea snail

Vexillum tumidum, common name the swollen mitre, is a species of small sea snail, marine gastropod mollusk in the family Costellariidae, the ribbed miters.

== Description ==
The length of the shell attains 47.7 mm.

(original description) The shell is shortly fusiform with a short spire and a sharp apex. The shell has swollen whorls that are flatly angulated round the upper part and longitudinally rudely ribbed. The ribs are nodulosely swollen at the angle. The shell is whitish or greenish, the whorls stained with red about the angle. The body whorl is encircled round the middle with a rather broad black belt. The columella is three- or four plaited.

== Distribution ==
This marine species occurs off Palau.
