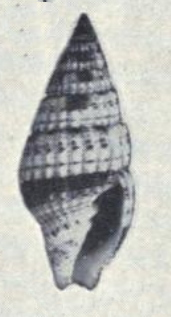
- Drawing of a shell of Vexillum xenium (holotype)

Scientific classification
- Kingdom: Animalia
- Phylum: Mollusca
- Class: Gastropoda
- Subclass: Caenogastropoda
- Order: Neogastropoda
- Superfamily: Turbinelloidea
- Family: Costellariidae
- Genus: Vexillum
- Species: V. xenium

Binomial name
- Vexillum xenium Pilsbry, 1921

Synonyms
- Vexillum (Costellaria) xenium Pilsbry, 1921

= Vexillum xenium =

Species of gastropod

Vexillum xenium is a species of small sea snail, marine gastropod mollusk in the family Costellariidae, the ribbed miters.

== Description ==
The length of the shell varies between 18 mm and 27 mm, the aperture 8.4 mm.

(Original description) The shell is fusiform, containing ten whorls. It is white with a chestnut band traversed by several paler spiral lines, below the periphery, two or three paler interrupted lines above it on the summits of the ribs only, and a few widely spaced blackish-brown spots below the suture, on the ends of some of the ribs. The first three whorls are also deep brown.

The sculpture consists of smooth, longitudinal ribs, 22 on the body whorl, equal to their interstices, the latter marked with short impressions in spiral series, 6 on the penultimate whorl in each interval. The base is spirally grooved over ribs and intervals forming about 4 spiral series of tubercles. Two obliquely spiral cords are more prominent just above the siphonal fasciole. The aperture is shorter than the spire. The throat shows 9 thin beaded lirae. The columella has 5 thin plaits.

== Distribution ==
This marine species occurs off the Philippines.
