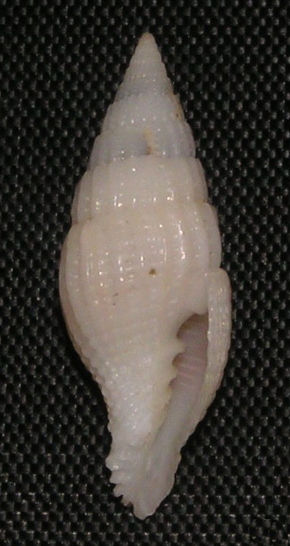
- Shell of Vexillum rubellum

Scientific classification
- Kingdom: Animalia
- Phylum: Mollusca
- Class: Gastropoda
- Subclass: Caenogastropoda
- Order: Neogastropoda
- Superfamily: Turbinelloidea
- Family: Costellariidae
- Genus: Vexillum
- Species: V. rubellum

Binomial name
- Vexillum rubellum (Adams & Reeve, 1850)

Synonyms
- Mitra rubella A. Adams & Reeve, 1850 superseded combination; Vexillum (Costellaria) rubellum (A. Adams & Reeve, 1850)

= Vexillum rubellum =

Species of gastropod

Vexillum rubellum is a species of small sea snail, marine gastropod mollusk in the family Costellariidae, the ribbed miters.

== Description ==
The length of the shell attains 28.1 mm.

The turreted shell has a fusiform shape. It has a uniform, delicate rose-tint, and is finely cancellated throughout. The whorls are swollen behind, and attenuated and recurved in front. The columella is four-plaited. The base of the shell slightly contorted and recurved.

== Distribution ==
This marine species occurs off the Philippines.
