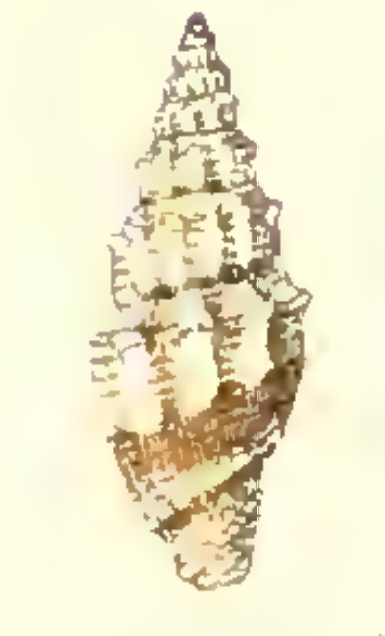
- Shell of Vexillum rusticum (holotype)

Scientific classification
- Kingdom: Animalia
- Phylum: Mollusca
- Class: Gastropoda
- Subclass: Caenogastropoda
- Order: Neogastropoda
- Superfamily: Turbinelloidea
- Family: Costellariidae
- Genus: Vexillum
- Species: V. rusticum

Binomial name
- Vexillum rusticum (Reeve, 1845)

Synonyms
- Mitra rustica Reeve, 1845; Vexillum (Costellaria) rusticum (Reeve, 1845)

= Vexillum rusticum =

Species of gastropod

Vexillum rusticum, common name the rustic mitre, is a species of small sea snail, marine gastropod mollusk in the family Costellariidae, the ribbed miters.

== Description ==
The length of the shell attains 21.4 mm.

(original description) The shell is oblong-ovate with the spire turreted. The whorls are angulated at the upper part, longitudinally ribbed, with the ribs rather distant. There are prickly tubercles on the angle, transversely punctured. The shell is whitish, the lower part of the shell ash-colour. The columella is four-plaited.

== Distribution ==
This marine species occurs off French Polynesia and Papua New Guinea.
