= Vexillum picardali =

Scientific classification
- Kingdom: Animalia
- Phylum: Mollusca
- Class: Gastropoda
- Subclass: Caenogastropoda
- Order: Neogastropoda
- Superfamily: Turbinelloidea
- Family: Costellariidae
- Genus: Vexillum
- Species: V. picardali

Binomial name
- Vexillum picardali Herrmann & Stossier, 2011

Synonyms
- Pusia picardali (Herrmann & Stossier, 2011); Vexillum (Pusia) picardali Herrmann & Stossier, 2011

Species of gastropod

Vexillum picardali is a species of sea snail, a marine gastropod mollusk, in the family Costellariidae, the ribbed miters.

== Description ==
The length of the shell attains 10.5 mm.

== Distribution ==
This marine species occurs off the Philippines.
