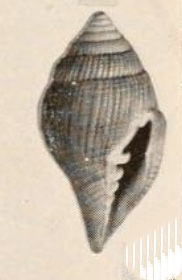
- Shell

Scientific classification
- Kingdom: Animalia
- Phylum: Mollusca
- Class: Gastropoda
- Subclass: Caenogastropoda
- Order: Neogastropoda
- Superfamily: Turbinelloidea
- Family: Costellariidae
- Genus: Vexillum
- Species: V. turben

Binomial name
- Vexillum turben (Reeve, 1844)

Synonyms
- Mitra turben Reeve, 1844 (original combination); Vexillum (Pusia) turben (Reeve, 1844); Vexillum turben kanaka Pilsbry, 1921

= Vexillum turben =

Species of gastropod

Vexillum turben, common name the spinning-top mitre, is a species of small sea snail, marine gastropod mollusk in the family Costellariidae, the ribbed miters.

== Description ==
The length of the shell attains 22.7 mm, its diameter 12 mm.

(Original description) The shell is oblong-ovate, attenuated at the base. The spire is obtusely rounded. The sutures are rather deep. The shell is longitudinally very closely plicately fine-ribbed. The ribs and interstices are transversely impressely striated. The shell is orange-yellow. The columella is five-plaited with the plaits prominent. The aperture is striated within.

(Described as Vexillum turben kanak ) The shell is similar to Vexillum turben (Reeve, 1844) (Philippine Islands) in sculpture and the ochraceous-buff or buff-yellow color, but the spire is more shortly and a little concavely conic above, the penultimate whorl is slightly swollen. There are six plaits, the upper one strong and horizontal. Within the outer lip there is a small fold, more prominent than the others about the upper third.

== Distribution ==
This marine species occurs in the Indo-west and central Pacific, off Mozambique, the Philippines and Hawaii.
