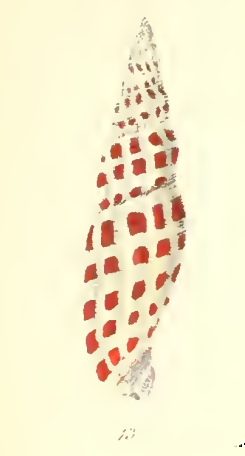
- Shell of Vexillum stainforthii (holotype)

Scientific classification
- Kingdom: Animalia
- Phylum: Mollusca
- Class: Gastropoda
- Subclass: Caenogastropoda
- Order: Neogastropoda
- Superfamily: Turbinelloidea
- Family: Costellariidae
- Genus: Vexillum
- Species: V. stainforthii

Binomial name
- Vexillum stainforthii (Reeve, 1842)

Synonyms
- Mitra stainforthii Reeve, 1841 · unaccepted (original combination); Vexillum (Costellaria) stainforthii (Reeve, 1842) ·

= Vexillum stainforthii =

Species of gastropod

Vexillum stainforthii, common name Stainforth's mitre, is a species of small sea snail, marine gastropod mollusk in the family Costellariidae, scientifically known as the ribbed miters.

== Description ==
The length of the shell attains 51 mm.

(Original description) The narrow shell is somewhat cylindrically fusiform ith a high spire and a purple-brown apex. The eight whorls are transversely striated and longitudinally ribbed. The strong, axial ribs are rather broad, convex, somewhat distant (about ten on the body whorl). They are crossed by fine, closely set, spiral grooves. The outer lip is slightly concave. The extended siphonal canal is slightly recurved and purple-brown at its end. The shell is whitish, the base and apex are ashy blue, the ribs painted with square bright red spots. The columella is four-plaited and is brown anteriorly.

== Distribution ==
This marine species occurs in the Indo-West Pacific: the Philippines, the South China Sea, Okinawa, Japan; also off Australia (Northern Territory, Queensland, Western Australia).
