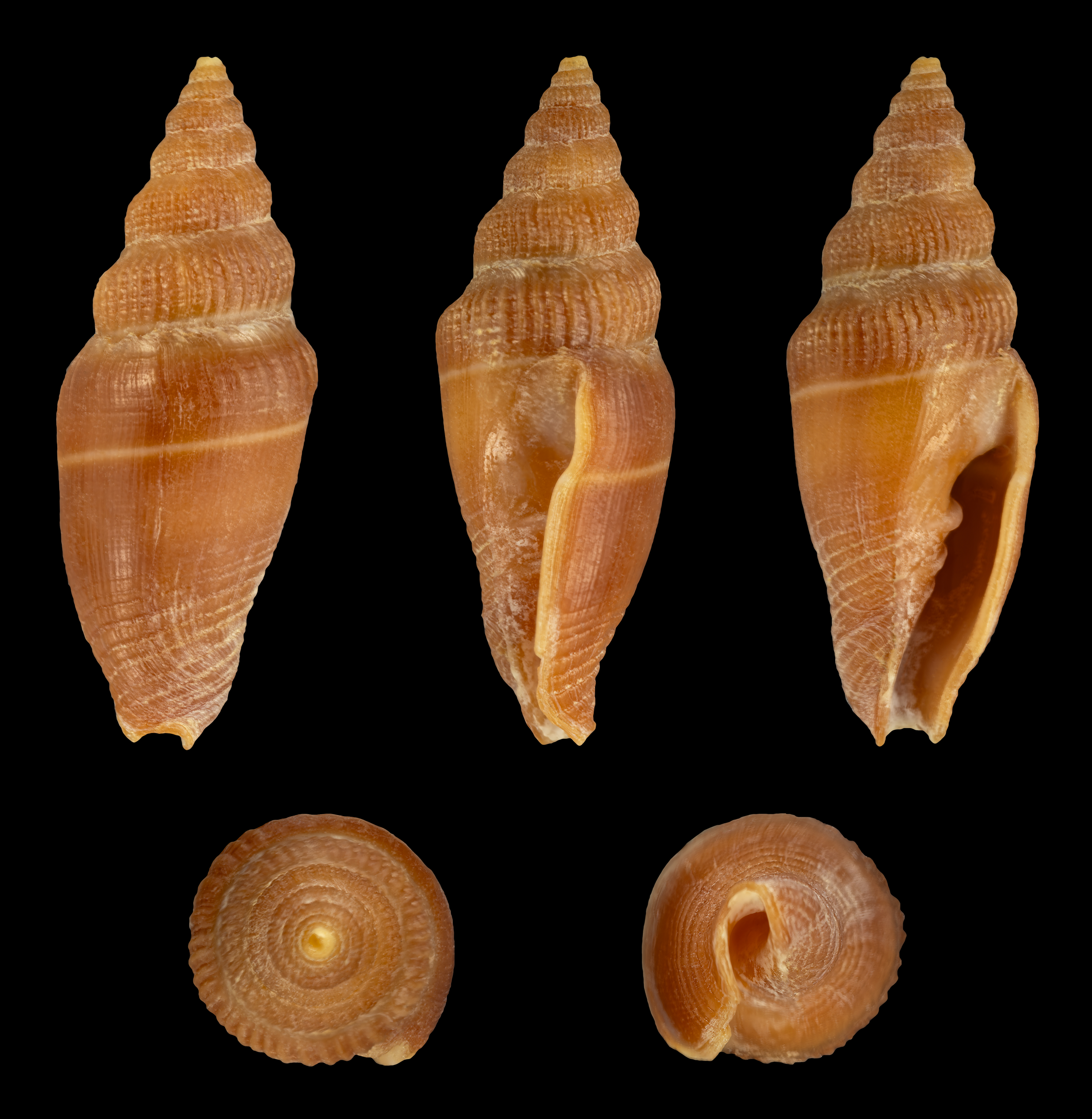
- Vexillum funereum

Scientific classification
- Kingdom: Animalia
- Phylum: Mollusca
- Class: Gastropoda
- Subclass: Caenogastropoda
- Order: Neogastropoda
- Superfamily: Turbinelloidea
- Family: Costellariidae
- Genus: Vexillum
- Species: V. funereum

Binomial name
- Vexillum funereum (Reeve, 1844)

Synonyms
- Costellaria funerata (O.A.L. Mörch, 1852); Mitra funerata Mörch, O.A.L., 1852; Vexillum (Costellaria) funereum (Reeve, 1844) ·

= Vexillum funereum =

Species of gastropod

Vexillum funereum, common name the funereal mitre, is a species of small sea snail, marine gastropod mollusk in the family Costellariidae, the ribbed miters.

== Description ==
The shell size varies between 20 mm and 30mm.

(original description) The shell is shortly fusiform and has a sharp spire. The whorls are well rounded, very closely decussated with longitudinal and transverse ridges. The upper portion of the body whorl is similarly sculptured, the middle smooth or nearly so, the recurved base with close revolving striae. The color of the shell is dark mahogany-brown, encircled with a single narrow yellow belt. The columella is three-plaited.

The whorls of the spire have a peculiar rounded decussated appearance, with the yellow belt just falling in the sutural depression.

== Distribution ==
This species occurs in the Indian Ocean off Réunion and in the Pacific Ocean off the Philippines and the Solomon Islands and New Caledonia.
