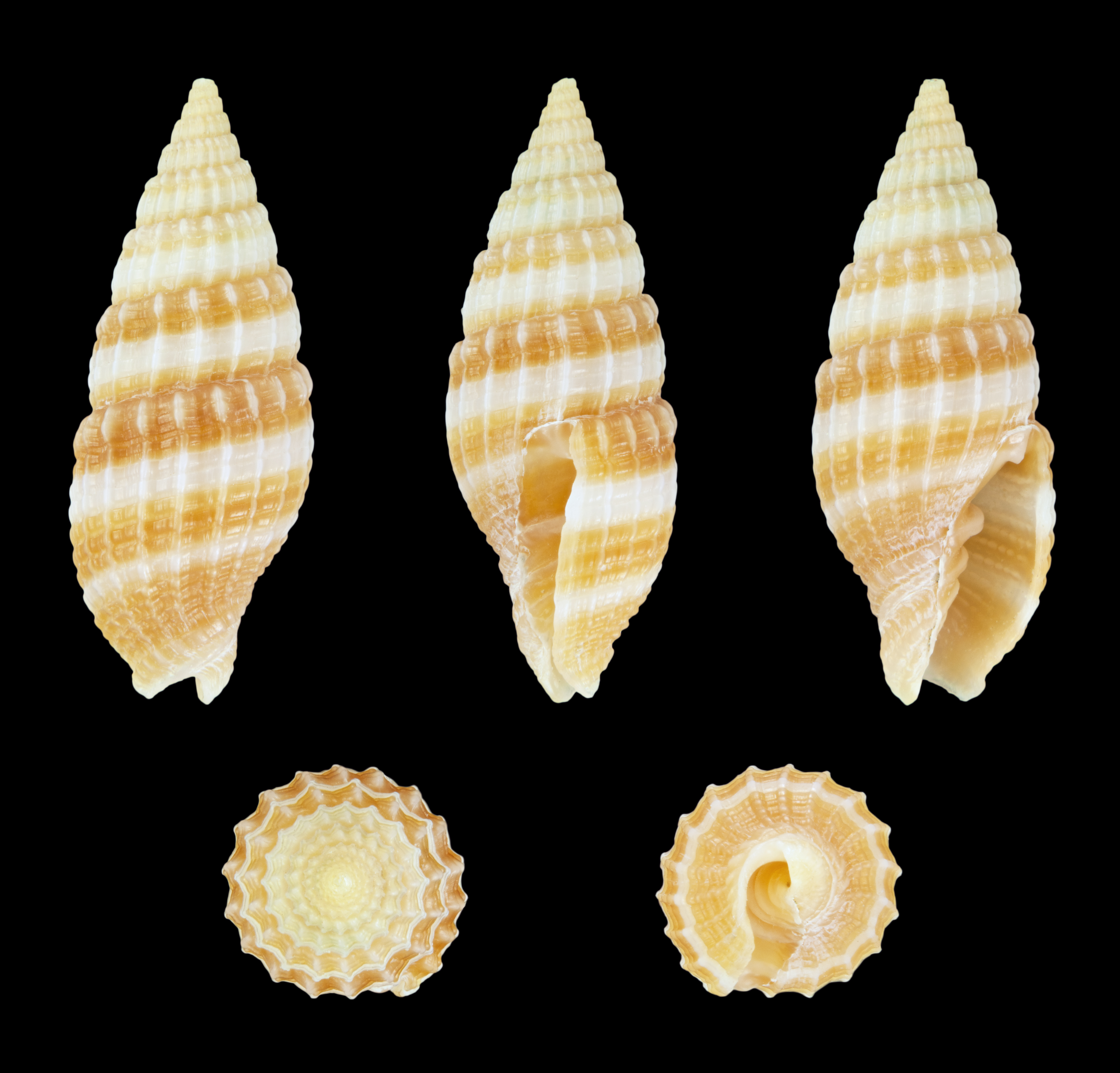

Scientific classification
- Kingdom: Animalia
- Phylum: Mollusca
- Class: Gastropoda
- Subclass: Caenogastropoda
- Order: Neogastropoda
- Family: Costellariidae
- Genus: Vexillum
- Species: V. amandum

Binomial name
- Vexillum amandum (Reeve, 1845)

Synonyms
- Costellaria immaculata J.C. Melvill & R. Standen, 1901; Costellaria kempi H.B. Preston, 1914; Uromitra fulleri MacNeil, 1960; Vexillum immaculata Melvill, J.C. & R. Standen, 1901; Vexillum (Costellaria) amandum (Reeve, 1845); Vexillum (Costellaria) malcolmensis Melvill, J.C. & R. Standen, 1901; Vexillum (Costellaria) marciae Sowerby, G.B. III, 1913; Vexillum kempi Preston, H.B., 1914

= Vexillum amandum =

Species of gastropod

Vexillum amandum, common name: the Amanda mitre or the beloved mitre, is a species of small sea snail, marine gastropod mollusk in the family Costellariidae, the ribbed miters.

== Description ==
The shell size varies between 8 mm and 20 mm.

(Original description) The shell is somewhat pyramidal. The spire is sharply turreted. The whorls are longitudinally closely ribbed, transversely impressed. They are encircled throughout with narrow white and reddish brown bands. The columella is four-plaited.

(Described as Vexillum (Costellaria) malcolmensis ) The shell is variable both in sculpture and colouring, though not so in form. This little species, evidently abundant in certain favoured localities, differs in the number of longitudinal ribs, some specimens having half as many again on the body whorl as have others. The rufous banding is also entirely absent in specimens dredged from any depth. Occasionally, too, examples with the body whorl almost wholly rufous brown turn up. Perhaps the nearest ally to this is Vexillum scitulum (A. Adams, 1853); the body- whorl is not so attenuate basally. Vexillum discolorium (Reeve, 1845) is hardly comparable, though a little similar in coloration. Vexillum fidicula (Gould, 1850) is far more scalate. Vexillum mica (Reeve, 1845), from Island of Guimaras, which is only known from a figure, is more like in form but of different pattern; and Vexillum caelatum (Reeve, 1845) has whorls angular above and the outer lip more flexuous. It is likewise comparable to Vexillum delicatum (A. Adams, 1853)

The type is twice banded with rufous brown spirally at the interstices between the ribs. The var. immaculata, a white or pale yellow almost unhanded variety, is found at 10-50 fathoms.

== Distribution ==
This species occurs in the Red Sea, in the Indian Ocean off Mozambique, in the Pacific Ocean off the Philippines and Eastern Australia.

Fossils were found in late Miocene strata in Fiji.
