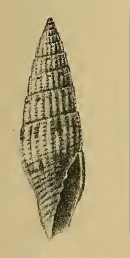
- Drawing of a shell of Vexillum diaconale (holotype)

Scientific classification
- Kingdom: Animalia
- Phylum: Mollusca
- Class: Gastropoda
- Subclass: Caenogastropoda
- Order: Neogastropoda
- Superfamily: Turbinelloidea
- Family: Costellariidae
- Genus: Vexillum
- Species: V. diaconale

Binomial name
- Vexillum diaconale (Melvill & Standen, 1903)

Synonyms
- Mitra (Costellaria) diaconalis Melvill & Standen, 1903

= Vexillum diaconale =

Species of gastropod

Vexillum diaconale is a species of sea snail, a marine gastropod mollusk, in the family Costellariidae, the ribbed miters.

== Description ==
The length of the shell varies between 13 mm and 17 mm.

This small, fusiform species contains 12 whorls. It is allied to Vexillum scitulum (A. Adams, 1853), which, however, possesses the whorls more scalate and with darker maculations and shading. It is, moreover, a smaller species.

== Distribution ==
This marine species occurs in the Persian Gulf and in the Indian Ocean off Mozambique.

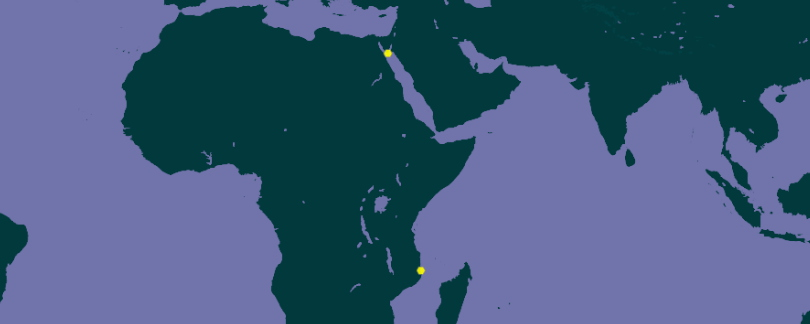
Distribution
