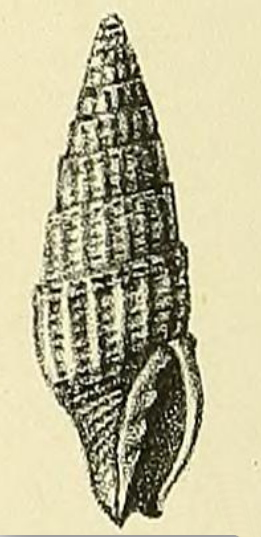
- Drawing of a shell of Vexillum malcolmense (holotype)

Scientific classification
- Kingdom: Animalia
- Phylum: Mollusca
- Class: Gastropoda
- Subclass: Caenogastropoda
- Order: Neogastropoda
- Superfamily: Turbinelloidea
- Family: Costellariidae
- Genus: Vexillum
- Species: V. malcolmense

Binomial name
- Vexillum malcolmense (Melvill & Standen, 1901)

Synonyms
- Mitra (Costellaria) malcolmensis Melvill & Standen, 1901 (basionym); Mitra (Costellaria) malcolmensis var. immaculata Melvill & Standen, 1901; Mitra malcolmensis Melvill & Standen, 1901; Vexillum (Costellaria) malcolmense (Melvill & Standen, 1901)

= Vexillum malcolmense =

Species of mollusc

Vexillum malcolmense is a species of sea snail, a marine gastropod mollusk, in the family Costellariidae, the ribbed miters.

== Description ==
The length of the shell attains 9.2 mm, its diameter 3 mm.

The shell is variable both in sculpture and colouring, though not so in form. This species differs in the number of longitudinal ribs, some specimens having half as many again on the body whorl as have others. The rufous banding is also entirely absent in specimens dredged from any depth. Occasionally, too, examples with the body-whorl almost wholly rufous brown turn up. Perhaps the nearest ally to this is Vexillum scitulum (A. Adams, 1853); the body-whorl is not so attenuate basally.

The type is twice banded with rufous brown spirally at the interstices between the ribs. The variety Mitra (Costellaria) malcolmensis var. immaculata Melvill & Standen, 1901, a white or pale yellow almost unhanded variety, is found at 10-50 fathoms. This is probably the shell mentioned (Journ. As. Soc. Bengal, xliv. pt. 2, p. 106) by Messrs. G. & H. Nevill as " a new species closely allied to Turricula (Thala) casta H. Ad., which has been dredged rather abundantly by Mr. W. T. Blanford in the Gulf of Oman." T. casta H. Ad. is a synonym of M. (Turricula) hastata Sowb., and which also might be mentioned as an ally of M. malcolmensis.

== Distribution ==
This marine species occurs in the Persian Gulf and the Gulf of Oman; also off Mozambique, the Philippines and Indonesia.
