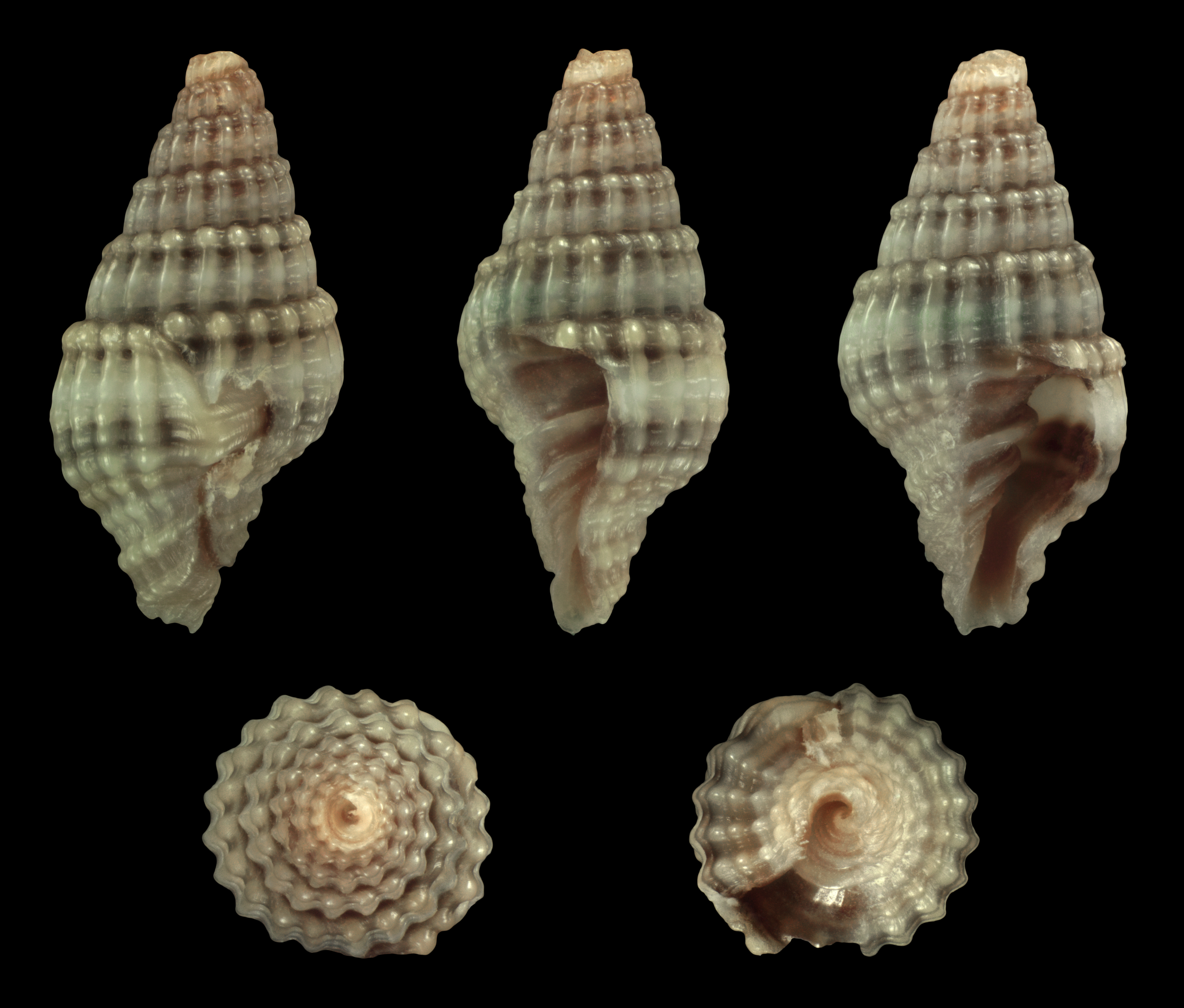
- A shell of Vexillum mica

Scientific classification
- Kingdom: Animalia
- Phylum: Mollusca
- Class: Gastropoda
- Subclass: Caenogastropoda
- Order: Neogastropoda
- Superfamily: Turbinelloidea
- Family: Costellariidae
- Genus: Vexillum
- Species: V. mica

Binomial name
- Vexillum mica (Reeve, 1845)

Synonyms
- Mitra mica Reeve, 1845 (original combination); Vexillum (Costellaria) mica (Reeve, 1845) ·

= Vexillum mica =

Species of gastropod

Vexillum mica, common name the glittering mitre, is a species of small sea snail, marine gastropod mollusk in the family Costellariidae, the ribbed miters.

== Description ==
The length of the shell varies between 7 mm and 9.5 mm.

(Original description) The shell is somewhat fusiformly ovate, smooth, polished and ivory white. It is faintly banded with orange. The columella is four-plaited.

This is a small white orange-banded shell with a surface as hard and shining as polished ivory.

== Distribution ==
This marine species occurs off the Philippines and Guam.
