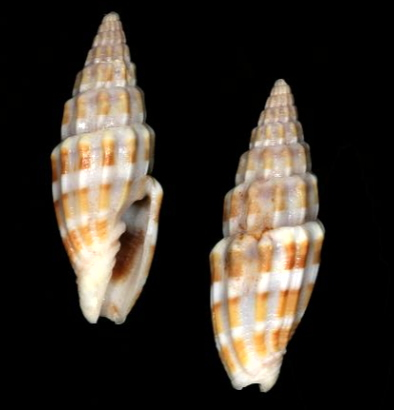
- Shell of Vexillum fidicula (holotype at the Smithsonian Institution)

Scientific classification
- Kingdom: Animalia
- Phylum: Mollusca
- Class: Gastropoda
- Subclass: Caenogastropoda
- Order: Neogastropoda
- Superfamily: Turbinelloidea
- Family: Costellariidae
- Genus: Vexillum
- Species: V. fidicula

Binomial name
- Vexillum fidicula (Gould, 1850)

Synonyms
- Mitra dunkeri Jickeli, 1874; Mitra fidicula A. Gould, 1850 (original combination); Vexillum (Costellaria) fidicula (Gould, 1850)

= Vexillum fidicula =

Species of gastropod

Vexillum fidicula is a species of small sea snail, marine gastropod mollusk in the family Costellariidae, the ribbed miters.

== Description ==
The shell reaches a length of 15.4 mm.

The shell is yellowish brown with a central white band. The ribs are whitish, sometimes a little nodular at the shoulder angle.

== Distribution ==
This species occurs in the eastern Indian Ocean and the western Pacific Ocean; also off Australia (Queensland).
