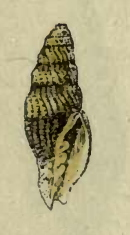
- Drawing of a shell of Vexillum caelatum

Scientific classification
- Kingdom: Animalia
- Phylum: Mollusca
- Class: Gastropoda
- Subclass: Caenogastropoda
- Order: Neogastropoda
- Family: Costellariidae
- Genus: Vexillum
- Species: V. caelatum

Binomial name
- Vexillum caelatum (Reeve, 1845)

Synonyms
- Mitra caelata Reeve, 1845; Turricula caelata (Reeve,1845); Vexillum (Costellaria) caelatum (Reeve, 1845)

= Vexillum caelatum =

Species of gastropod

Vexillum caelatum is a species of small sea snail, marine gastropod mollusk in the family Costellariidae, the ribbed miters.

== Description ==
The length of the shell is between 10.1 and 25 mm.

The color of the shell is yellowish or chestnut-brown, with an indistinct lighter band.

== Distribution ==
This marine species occurs off the Philippines, Mozambique, American Samoa, Vanuatu and Vietnam.
