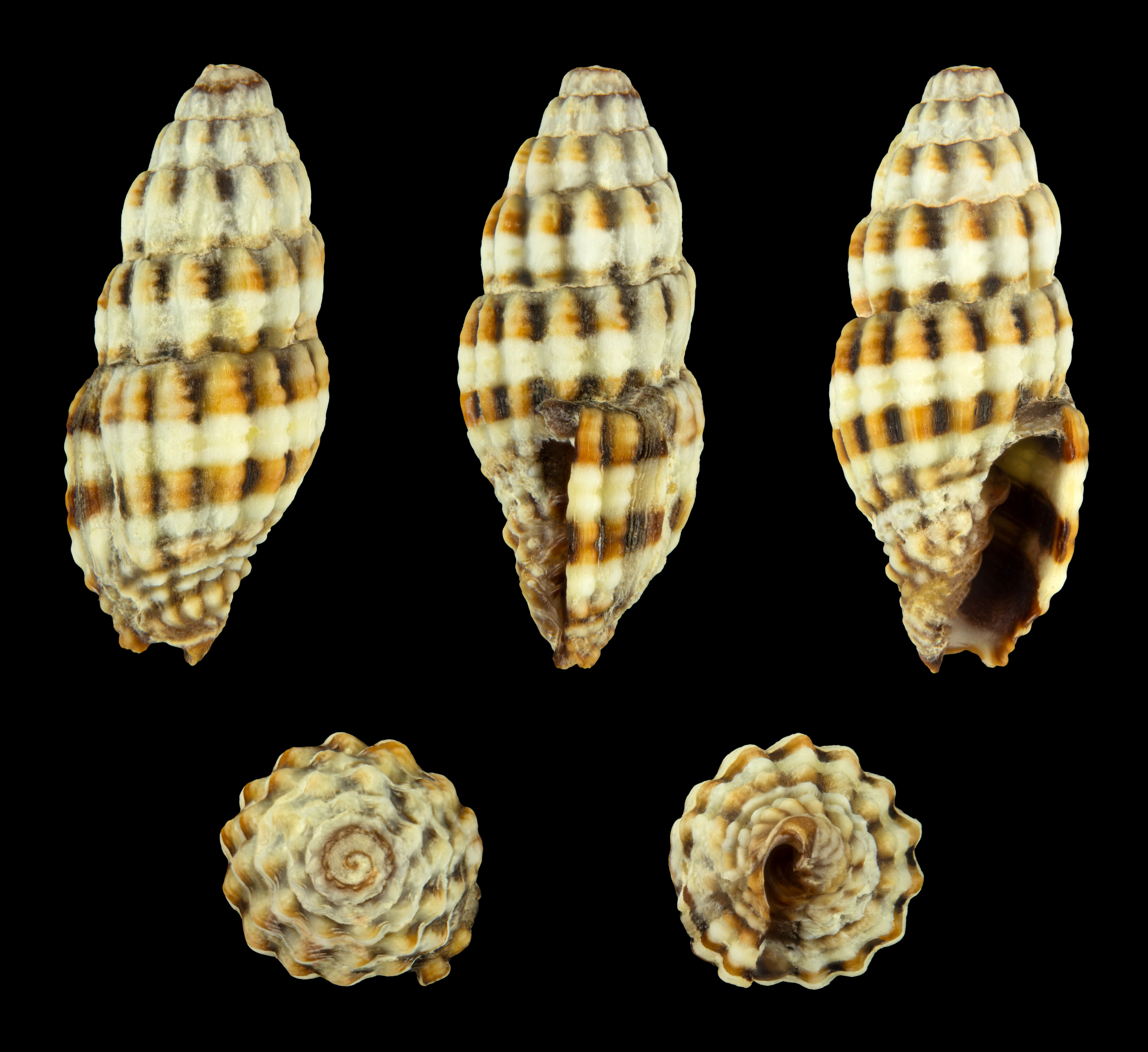
- Vexillum discolorium

Scientific classification
- Kingdom: Animalia
- Phylum: Mollusca
- Class: Gastropoda
- Subclass: Caenogastropoda
- Order: Neogastropoda
- Superfamily: Turbinelloidea
- Family: Costellariidae
- Genus: Vexillum
- Species: V. discolorium

Binomial name
- Vexillum discolorium (Reeve, 1845)

Synonyms
- Mitra discoloria Reeve, 1845 (original combination); Mitra (Costellaria) dilectissima Melvill, J.C. & Sykes, E.R. 1899; Vexillum (Pusia) discolorium (Reeve, 1845)

= Vexillum discolorium =

Species of gastropod

Vexillum discolorium, common name the sundry coloured mitre, is a species of small sea snail, marine gastropod mollusk in the family Costellariidae, the ribbed miters.

== Description ==
(Original description) The ovate shell is granulated at the base. The spire is acuminately turreted. The whorls prominent round the upper part and longitudinally conspicuously ribbed. The ribs are rather broad, obtuse and transversely impressly lineated. The shell is alternated with pink and white bands. The pink bands are stained in the interstices between the ribs with burnt black. The columella is four-plaited. The aperture is small.

== Distribution ==
This marine species occurs in the Indo-west Pacific from the Gulf of Oman through the tropical Pacific to Samoa; also off Australia (Northern Territory, Queensland, Western Australia).
