= Vexillum delicatum =

Scientific classification
- Kingdom: Animalia
- Phylum: Mollusca
- Class: Gastropoda
- Subclass: Caenogastropoda
- Order: Neogastropoda
- Superfamily: Turbinelloidea
- Family: Costellariidae
- Genus: Vexillum
- Species: V. delicatum

Binomial name
- Vexillum delicatum (A. Adams, 1853)

Synonyms
- Mitra delicata A. Adams, 1853 (original combination); Vexillum (Costellaria) delicatum (A. Adams, 1853)

Species of gastropod

Vexillum delicatum is a species of small sea snail, marine gastropod mollusk in the family Costellariidae, the ribbed miters.

== Description ==
The length of the shell attains 25 mm.

(Original description) The shell has an ovate-fusiform shape. The aperture is longer. The whorls are flat. The sutures are lightly impressed. The shell is dirty white, with two pale transverse bands. The longitudinal ribs show narrow, sharp, crenulated folds. They are transversely clathrate at the interstices, narrowed and anteriorly recurved at the body whorl. The columella is four-plaited. The outer lip shows a sharp, crenulated edge.

== Distribution ==
This marine species occurs off the Philippines, in the South China Sea, off Japan, Fiji and Australia (Queensland).
