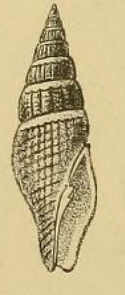
- Shell of Vexillum scitulum

Scientific classification
- Kingdom: Animalia
- Phylum: Mollusca
- Class: Gastropoda
- Subclass: Caenogastropoda
- Order: Neogastropoda
- Superfamily: Turbinelloidea
- Family: Costellariidae
- Genus: Vexillum
- Species: V. scitulum

Binomial name
- Vexillum scitulum (A. Adams, 1853)

Synonyms
- Mitra chariessa Melvill, 1888 ·; Mitra interpunctata Odhner, 1919; Mitra scitula A. Adams, 1853; Vexillum (Costellaria) interpunctatum Odhner, N.H.J., 1920; Vexillum (Costellaria) scitulum (A. Adams, 1853)

= Vexillum scitulum =

Species of gastropod

Vexillum scitulum is a species of small sea snail, marine gastropod mollusk in the family Costellariidae, the ribbed miters.

== Description ==
The shell size varies between 10 mm and 36 mm.

A small, turreted, fusiform and light-coloured species, with rather flat whorls, undulating axial ribs and clathrated interstices. The whorls are sprinkled with red spots. The aperture is narrow at the top. The base of the shell is slightly recurved. The columella is four-plaited.

(Described as Mitra chariessa) The shell is fusiform. The spire is elongate and turreted. The whorls are somewhat angled, delicately plaited beneath the suture, longitudinally very frequently ribbed, the interstices latticed. The colour is pure white. The columella four-plaited.

A remarkably beautiful shell, pure white with a very slight pinkish tinge, of exquisite sculpture and texture.

== Distribution ==
This species is distributed in the Persian Gulf, in the Indian Ocean along Madagascar, Mozambique and in the South China Sea.
