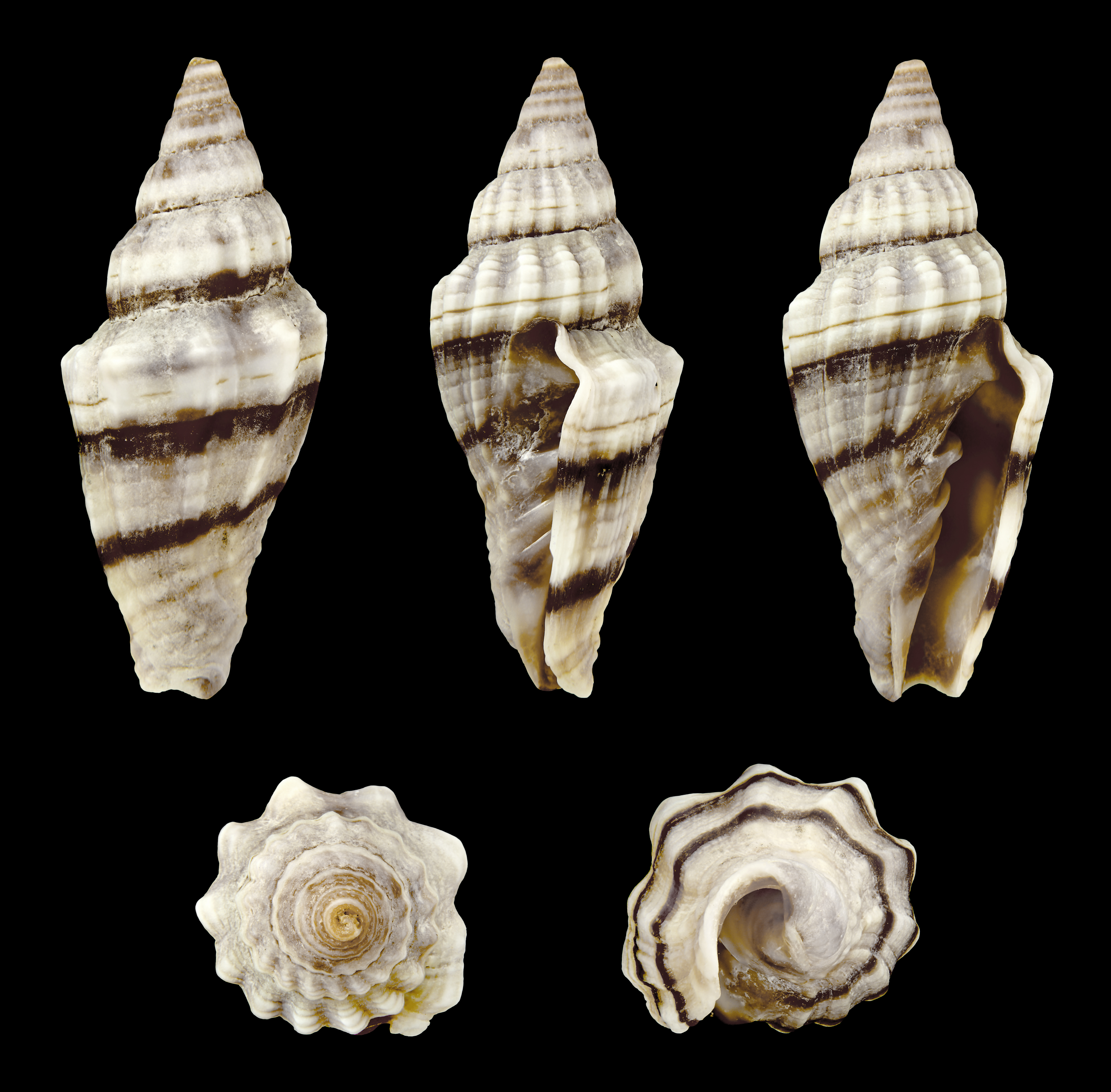
- Shell of Vexillum plicarium

Scientific classification
- Kingdom: Animalia
- Phylum: Mollusca
- Class: Gastropoda
- Subclass: Caenogastropoda
- Order: Neogastropoda
- Superfamily: Turbinelloidea
- Family: Costellariidae
- Genus: Vexillum
- Species: V. plicarium

Binomial name
- Vexillum plicarium (Linnaeus, 1758)

Synonyms
- Mitra denticulata Dall, W.H., 1905; Mitra discors Küster, 1840; Mitra lividum Röding, P.F., 1798; Mitra plicata Reeve, L.A., 1844; Mitra pullata Reeve, L.A., 1844; † Mitra (Turricula) plicaria (Linnaeus, 1758); Mitra umbrosa Sowerby, G.B. II & III, 1874; † Turricula plicaria (Linnaeus, 1758); Vexillum berthae Sowerby, G.B. II, 1879; Vexillum plicatum Röding, 1798; Vexillum pullatum (Reeve, 1844); Vexillum (Vexillum) plicarium (Linnaeus, 1758); Voluta plicaria Linnaeus, 1758 (original combination)

= Vexillum plicarium =

Species of gastropod

Vexillum plicarium, common name : the Plaited Mitre, is a species of small sea snail, marine gastropod mollusk in the family Costellariidae, the ribbed miters.

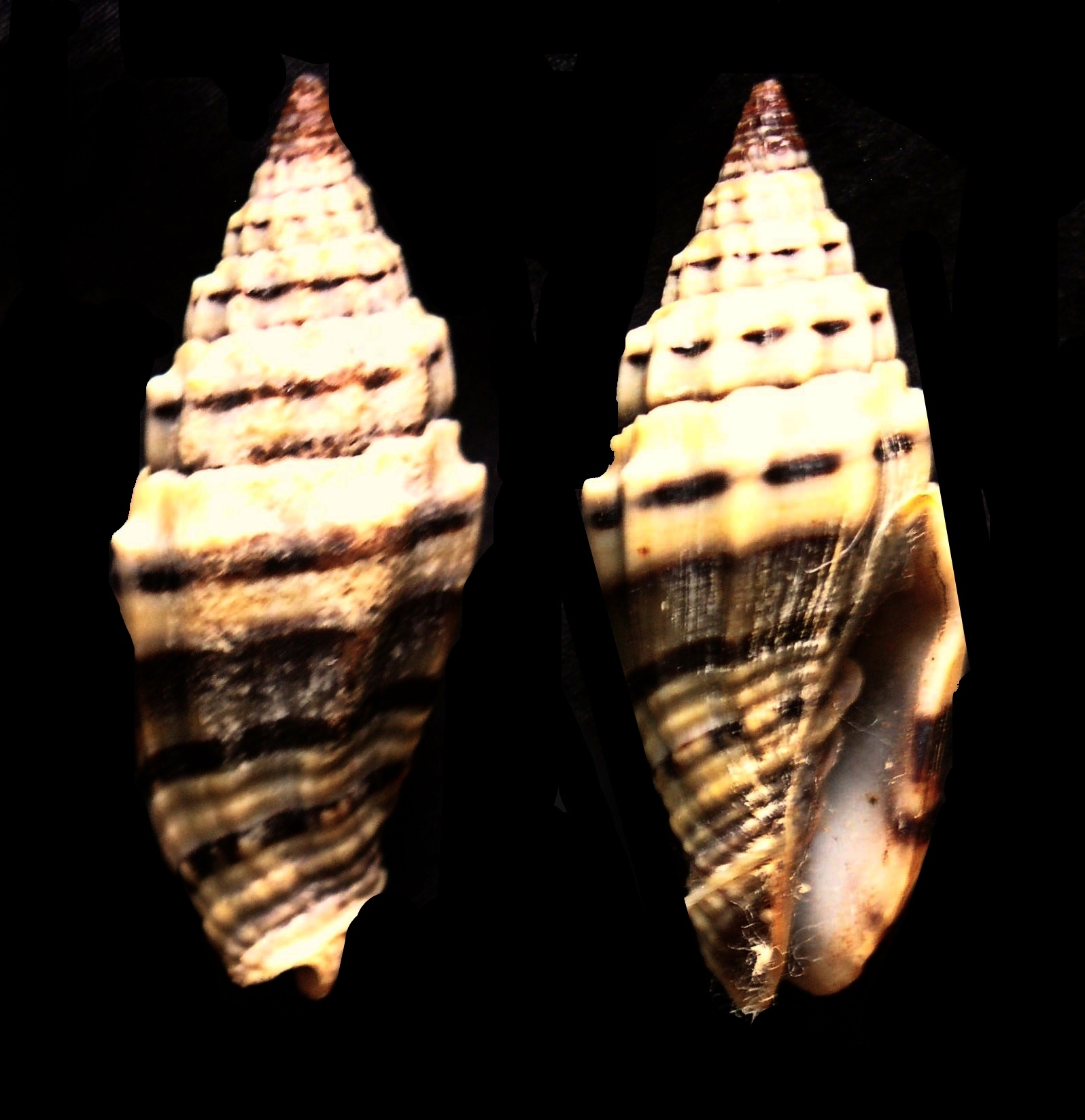
Plaited Mitre (Vexillum plicarium)

== Description ==
The shell size varies between 30 mm and 66 mm.

The shape is broadly fusiform with a high spire and a purple apex. The shell contains eight whorls. The suture is adpressed. The shell is concave from the suture to the sharp shoulder. The shell shows various strong, nodulose spiral ribs (about ten on the body whorl) with fine axial striae and spiral cords. The white columella has four plaits. This shell is usually white with black or dark brown spiral bands, but the basic color may also be cream or orange. The interior is white.

== Distribution ==
This species occurs in the east Indian Ocean; in the Andaman Sea and in the south-west Pacific Ocean off Samoa and the Philippines.

Fossils were found in Pliocene strata in Vanuatu.
