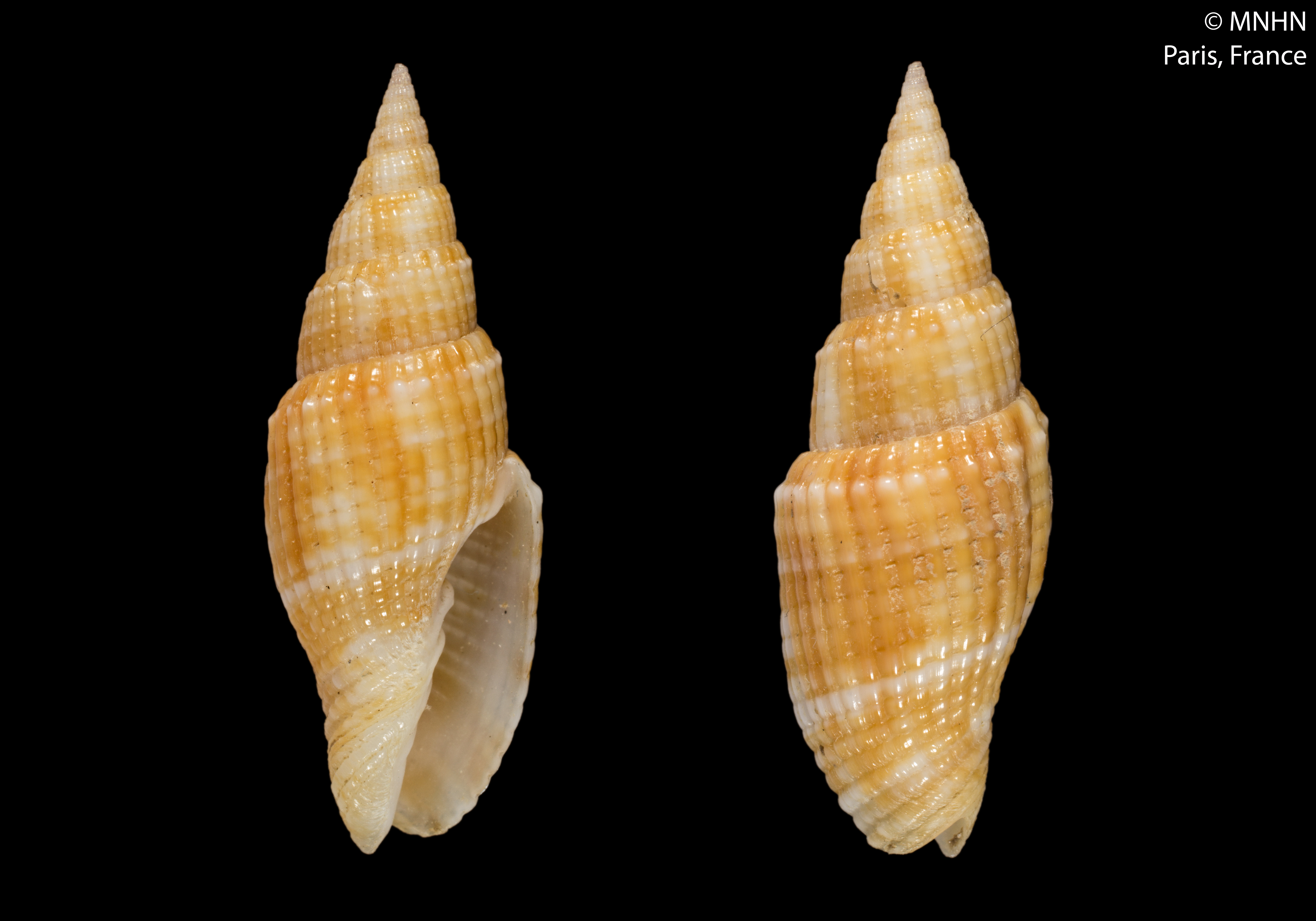
- Shell of Vexillum poppei (holotype at MNHN, Paris)

Scientific classification
- Kingdom: Animalia
- Phylum: Mollusca
- Class: Gastropoda
- Subclass: Caenogastropoda
- Order: Neogastropoda
- Superfamily: Turbinelloidea
- Family: Costellariidae
- Genus: Vexillum
- Species: V. poppei

Binomial name
- Vexillum poppei Guillot de Suduiraut, 2007

Synonyms
- Vexillum (Costellaria) poppei E. Guillot de Suduiraut, 2007 ·

= Vexillum poppei =

Species of sea snail

Vexillum poppei is a species of small sea snail, marine gastropod mollusk in the family Costellariidae, the ribbed miters.

== Description ==
The shell size varies between 22 mm and 37 mm.

== Distribution ==
This marine species occurs off the Philippines.

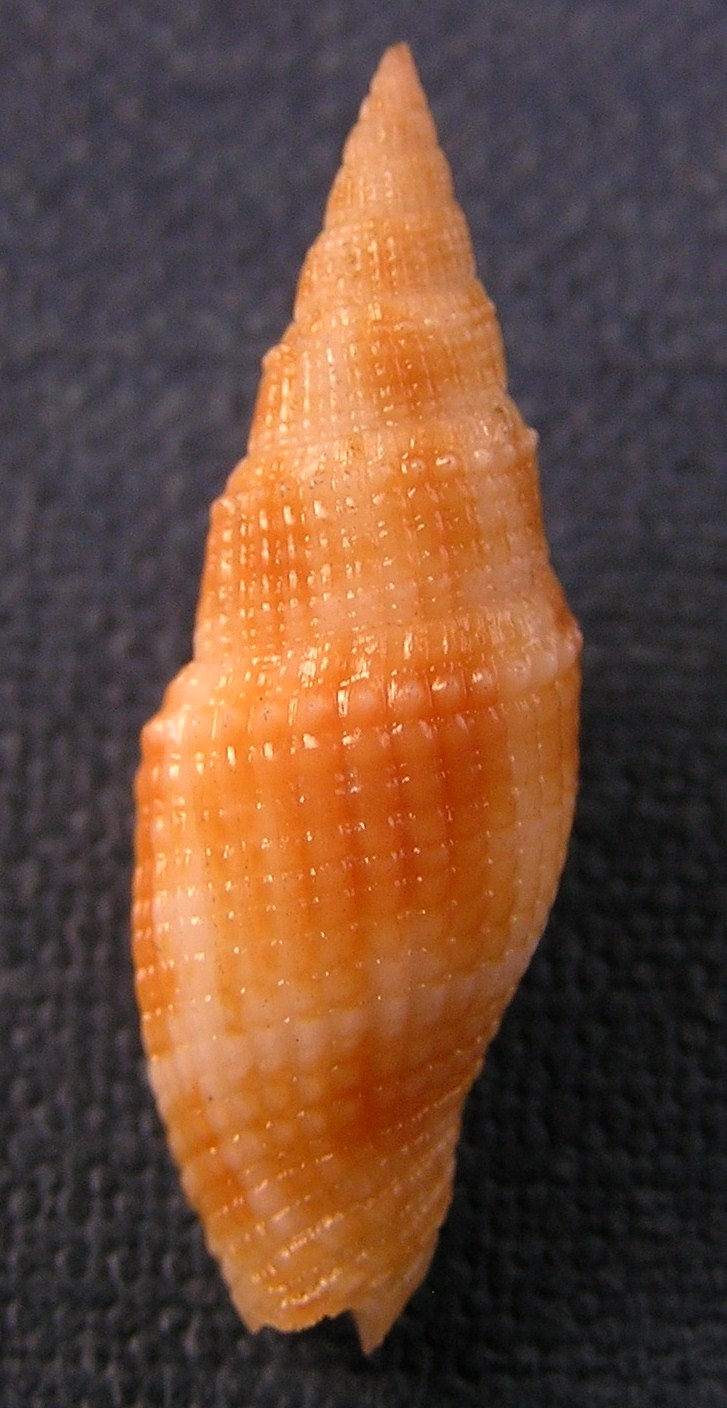
Vexillum poppei, abapertural view
