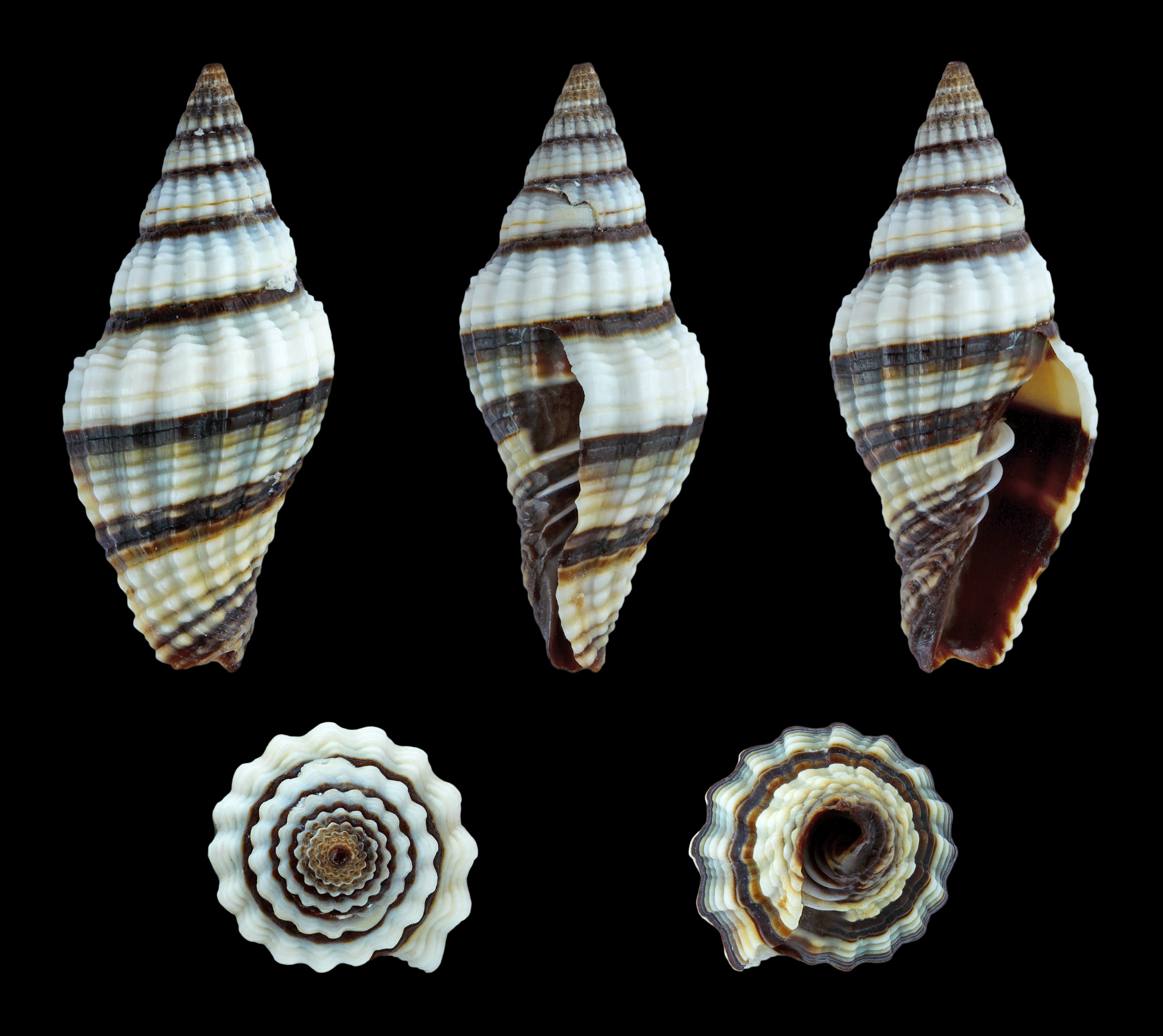

Scientific classification
- Kingdom: Animalia
- Phylum: Mollusca
- Class: Gastropoda
- Subclass: Caenogastropoda
- Order: Neogastropoda
- Superfamily: Turbinelloidea
- Family: Costellariidae
- Genus: Vexillum
- Species: V. rugosum

Binomial name
- Vexillum rugosum (Gmelin, 1791)

Synonyms
- Mitra corrugata Lamarck, 1811; † Turricula (Costellaria) corrugata (Lamarck, 1811); Turricula weberi Bartsch, 1918 (original combination); Vexillum (Vexillum) rugosum (Gmelin, 1791); Vexillum weberi (Bartsch, 1918); Voluta rugosa Gmelin, 1791

= Vexillum rugosum =

Species of gastropod

Vexillum rugosum, common name the rough mitre, is a species of small sea snail, marine gastropod mollusk in the family Costellariidae, the ribbed miters.

The subspecies Vexillum rugosum intermediatum [sic] has become a synonym of Vexillum intermedium (Kiener, 1838).

== Description ==
The length of the shell varies between 30 mm and 52 mm.

The shell is fusiform with a spire sharply acuminated. The whorls are depressed at the upper part, contracted in the middle, strongly latticed with rough nodules longitudinal and transverse ridges. It is white, irregularly sprinkled with spots and speckles of brown. The columella is five-plaited. The interior of the aperture is strongly striated.

The shell is whitish or ash color, banded with chocolate.

(Described as Turricula weberi) The shell is of medium size, elongate conic, the tip dark with a narrow dark zone at the suture and a broad dark band extending from the periphery over the posterior half of the base. This dark band really consists of two darker elements separated by one of about equal width, of a little lighter shade. The whorls of the protoconch are decollated. The whorls of the teleoconch are moderately rounded, feebly shouldered at the summit, marked by strong, well rounded axial ribs, of which eighteen occur upon the first and second of the remaining whorls in the type, twenty upon the third to sixth, and eighteen upon the penultimate whorl. These ribs are almost vertical and are about as wide as the spaces that separate them on the early whorls, while on the last whorl they are much less so. In addition to the axial ribs the entire surface is marked by strong incremental lines. The spiral sculpture consists of strong incised spiral grooves which run equally strongly over the intercostal spaces of the ribs and give to the latter, particularly in the body whorl, a somewhat granular appearance. Of these incised spirals, a single only occurs upon the first two whorls, while upon the third two are present; the fourth contains three, the fifth seven, the sixth eight, which is also the number between the summit and the periphery on the body whorl. On this they are equally spaced, while on the other turns the spacing is irregular. The periphery of the last whorls is well rounded. The base of the shell is slightly contracted in the middle, the anterior half marked by the continuation of the axial ribs, and twelve incised spiral lines which equal those on the spire in strength, but are not as regular in spacing. The anterior half of the base is marked by a strong keel in its middle, the prominent portion of which is almost parallel to the third columellar fold. In addition to this, there are five strong spiral cords posteriorly, and three anteriorly. The aperture has an irregular outline, the posterior angle is acute, decidedly channeled anteriorly. The outer lip is thin, somewhat sinuous. The inner lip is reflected and appressed to the base, forming a narrow umbilical chink at the extreme anterior end, provided with four strong oblique folds, of which the posterior is the strongest, while the other three decrease in size successively. The parietal wall is covered with a thin callus except at the posterior angle of the aperture, where it is decidedly thickened.

== Distribution ==
This marine species occurs in the Ind-West Pacific: off the Philippines, Indonesia, the Solomon Islands; in the South China Sea, Vietnam, Taiwan; also off Australia (Northern Territory, Queensland, Western Australia).
