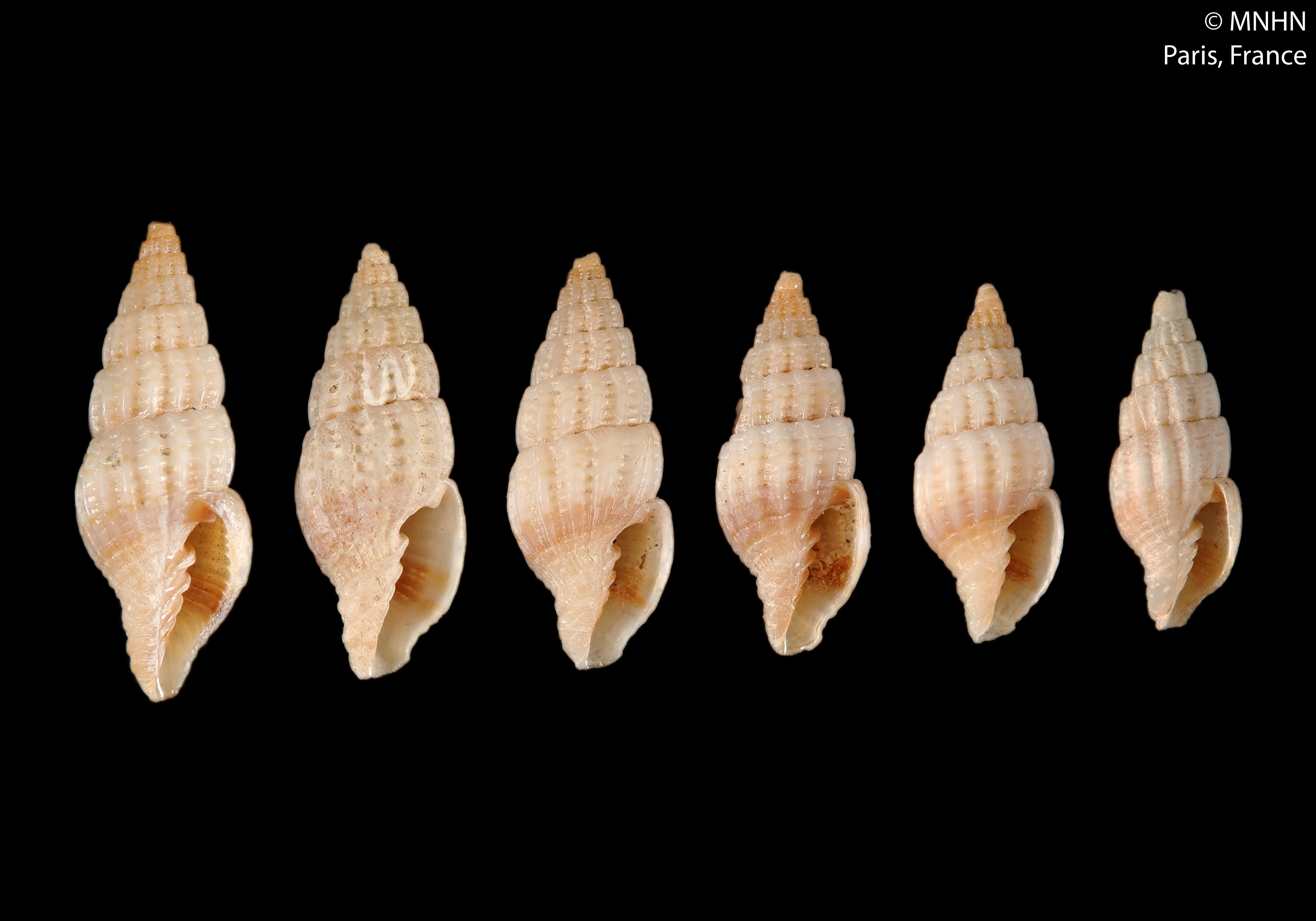
- Shell of Vexillum bipartitum (specimen at MNHN, Paris)

Scientific classification
- Kingdom: Animalia
- Phylum: Mollusca
- Class: Gastropoda
- Subclass: Caenogastropoda
- Order: Neogastropoda
- Superfamily: Turbinelloidea
- Family: Costellariidae
- Genus: Vexillum
- Species: V. bipartitum

Binomial name
- Vexillum bipartitum (E. A. Smith, 1844)

Synonyms
- Turricula (Callithea) bipartita E. A. Smith, 1884 (basionym); Turricula bipartita E. A. Smith, 1884 (original combination); Vexillum (Pusia) bipartitum (E. A. Smith, 1884)

= Vexillum bipartitum =

Species of gastropod

Vexillum bipartitum is a species of small sea snail, marine gastropod mollusk in the family Costellariidae, the ribbed miters.

== Description ==
The length of the shell attains 6 mm, its diameter 2 mm.

(Original description) The shell is small and fusiformly ovate. It has the spire and the upper half of the body whorl white, and the lower half stained with a dirty pale flesh-coloured band beneath and pinkish white at the extremity. The shell consists of eight whorls. The three protoconch whorls are smooth and convex. The rest are a little convex at the sides, longitudinally costate and spirally grooved. The re are 14 ribs on the penultimate whorl, attenuated inferiorly on the last, and not quite cut across by tho transverse sulci. These are deepish, not quite so broad as the interstices, numbering from 6 to 7 on the penultimate whorl and about 16 on the body whorl. The aperture is small, occupying less than half the length of the shell. The columella is pale pink, covered with a thin callus bearing four oblique plaits. The outer lip is thin, and armed within with about eight thread-like lirae.

== Distribution ==
This marine species occurs in the Indian Ocean off Réunion and Tanzania; also off the Philippines, Japan, Cook Islands, Tuamotu Islands, Bismarck Archipelago, Mariana Islands, Palau, Samoa, Tonga, Guam and the Solomon Islands.
