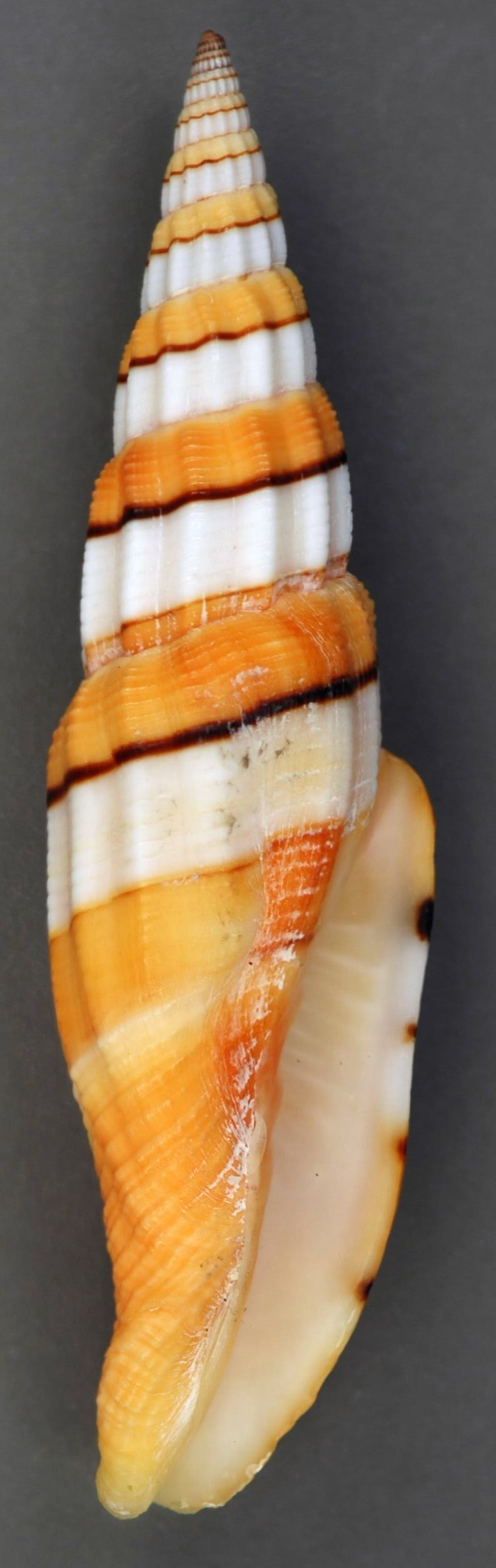
- Shell of Vexillum regina

Scientific classification
- Kingdom: Animalia
- Phylum: Mollusca
- Class: Gastropoda
- Subclass: Caenogastropoda
- Order: Neogastropoda
- Superfamily: Turbinelloidea
- Family: Costellariidae
- Genus: Vexillum
- Species: V. regina

Binomial name
- Vexillum regina (G.B. Sowerby I, 1828)

Synonyms
- Mitra regina G.B. Sowerby I, 1828; Vexillum tulearense T. Cossignani, 2021 junior subjective synonym; Voluta elegans Link, 1807 (nvalid: junior homonym of Voluta elegans Gmelin, 1791)

= Vexillum regina =

Species of gastropod

Vexillum regina, common name the queen mitre, is a species of sea snail, a marine gastropod mollusk, in the family Costellariidae, the ribbed miters.

Subspecies

- Vexillum regina filiareginae J. M. Cate, 1961 : synonym of Vexillum filiareginae J. M. Cate, 1961: synonym of Vexillum coloscopulus J. M. Cate, 1961

== Description ==
The queen miter snail (Vexillum regina) is spectacularly colored with white, orange, and dark brown stripes (the species does vary in coloration, however). Vexillum is a predatory snail that secretes toxins to immobilize & kill prey.

The shell is elongately fusiform. The spire is turreted and sharply produced. The whorls are angulated at the upper part, longitudinally ribbed, transversely elevately striated. The shell is alternately zoned with orange-red and blueish white, edged with black. The columella is four-plaited.

== Distribution ==
It is a tropical marine gastropod from the Indo-Western Pacific Basin: Madagascar, Mozambique, the Philippines; also in the Coral Sea.
