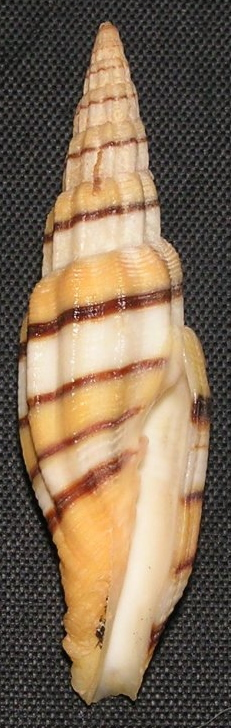
- Shell of Vexillum coloscopulus

Scientific classification
- Kingdom: Animalia
- Phylum: Mollusca
- Class: Gastropoda
- Subclass: Caenogastropoda
- Order: Neogastropoda
- Superfamily: Turbinelloidea
- Family: Costellariidae
- Genus: Vexillum
- Species: V. coloscopulus

Binomial name
- Vexillum coloscopulus (J. Cate, 1961)

Synonyms
- Vexillum filiareginae J. M. Cate, 1961; Vexillum regina filiareginae J. M. Cate, 1961 (original rank)

= Vexillum coloscopulus =

Species of gastropod

Vexillum coloscopulus is a species of sea snail, a marine gastropod mollusk, in the family Costellariidae, the ribbed miters.

== Taxonomic remark ==
Vexillum coloscopulus [1 July 1961] was published earlier than V. filiareginae [1 Oct. 1961], so the first name taking priority.

== Description ==
The length of the shell attains 9 mm.

== Distribution ==
This marine species occurs off the Philippines.
