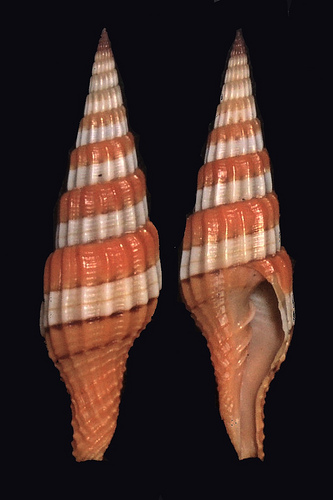
- Vexillum citrinum

Scientific classification
- Kingdom: Animalia
- Phylum: Mollusca
- Class: Gastropoda
- Subclass: Caenogastropoda
- Order: Neogastropoda
- Superfamily: Turbinelloidea
- Family: Costellariidae
- Genus: Vexillum
- Species: V. citrinum

Binomial name
- Vexillum citrinum (Gmelin, 1791)

Synonyms
- Mitra compressa Sowerby II & Sowerby III, 1874; Vexillum (Vexillum) citrinum (Gmelin, 1791); Voluta citrina Gmelin, 1791 (original combination)

= Vexillum citrinum =

Species of gastropods

Vexillum citrinum, common name the Queen Mitre, is a species of small sea snail, marine gastropod mollusk in the family Costellariidae, the ribbed miters.

== Description ==
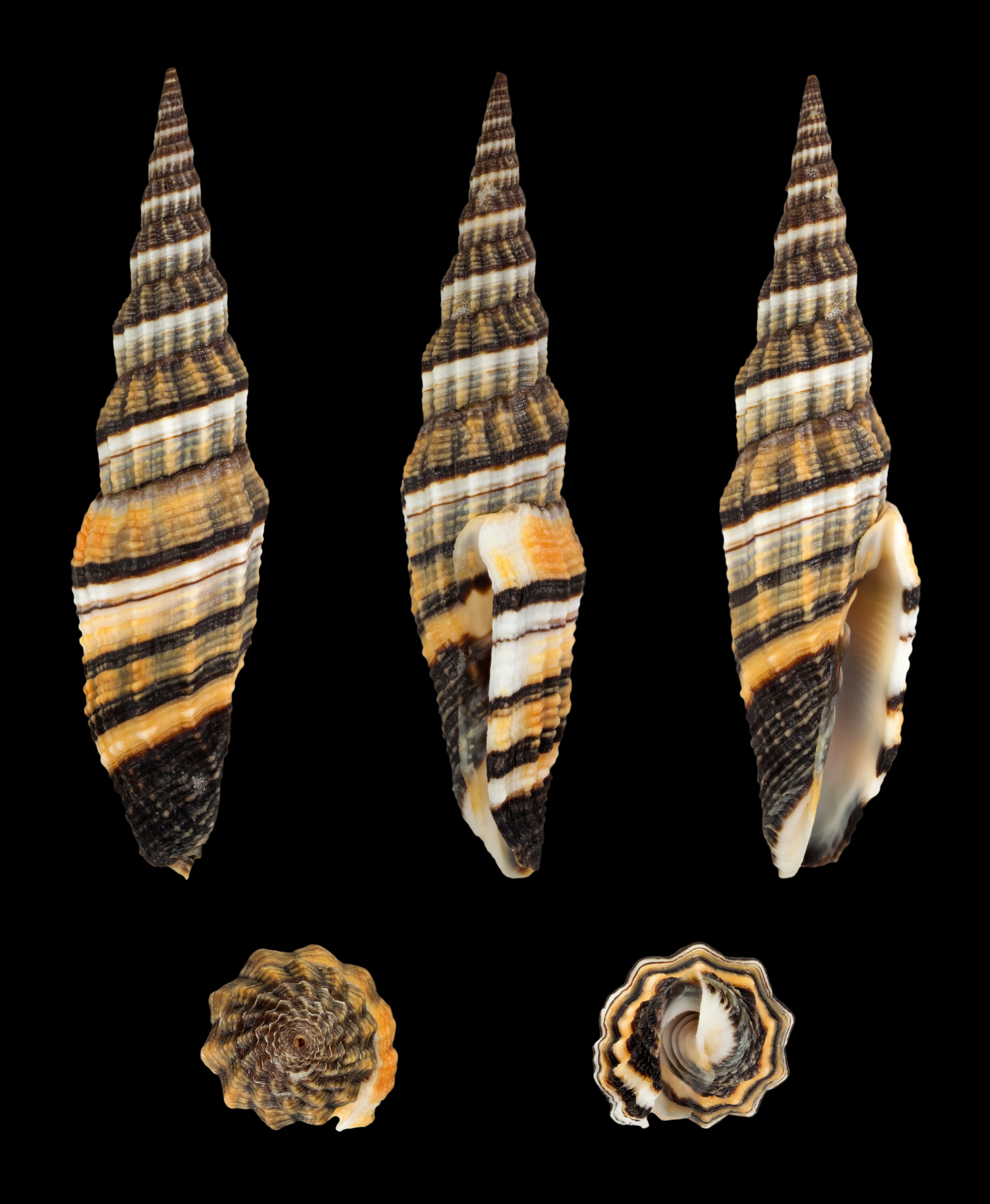
Brown form

The shell size varies between 50 mm and 86 mm.

The smooth shell is ovately conical, rounded and rather solid at the upper part. The spire is short, finely striated towards the apex. The apex is raised and sharp. The shell has as orange citron colour, variously stained with livid chesnut. The columella is five-plaited. The aperture is very long.

== Distribution ==
This species occurs in the Indian Ocean off East Africa, Madagascar and in the Western Pacific.
