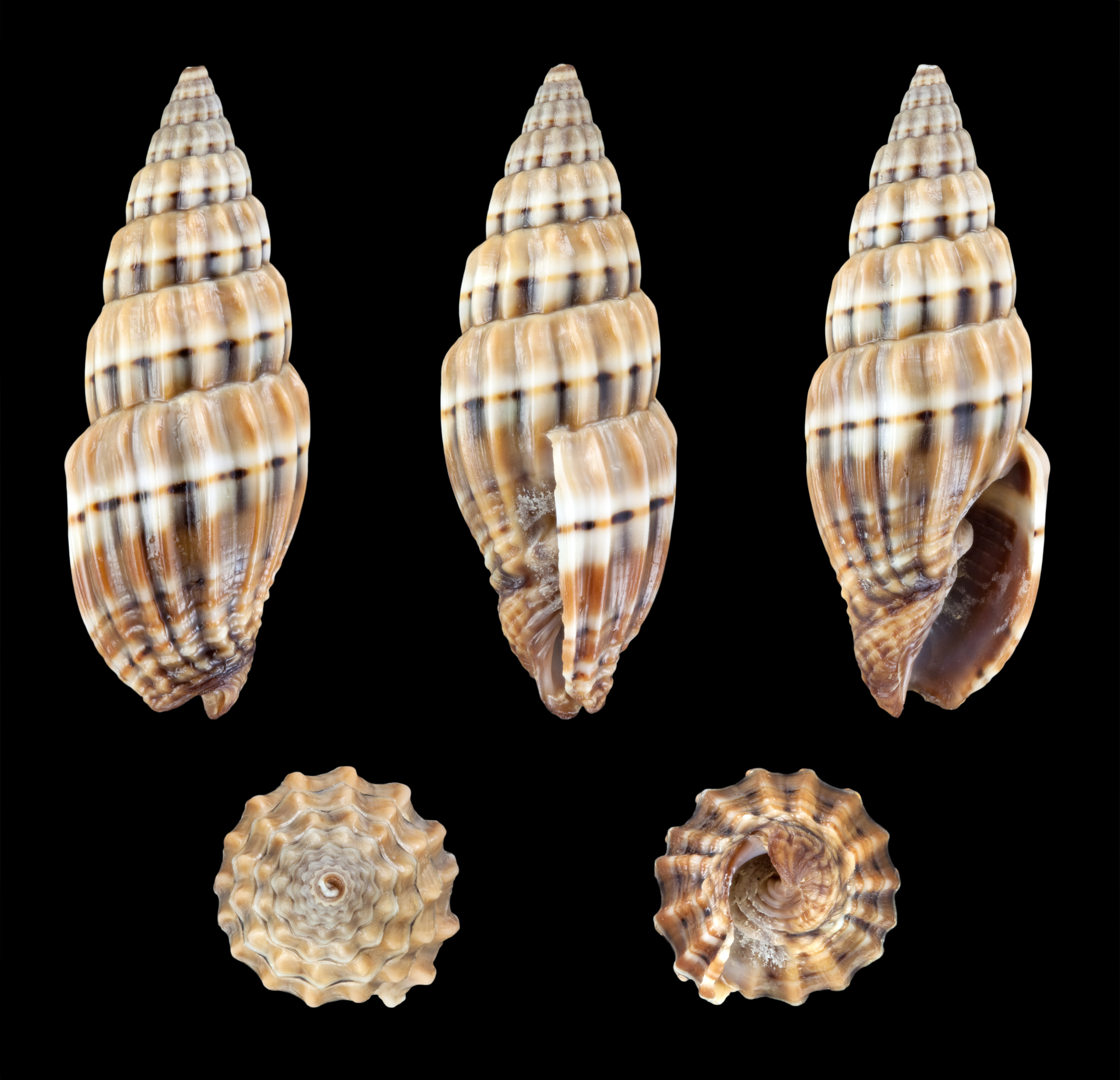

Scientific classification
- Kingdom: Animalia
- Phylum: Mollusca
- Class: Gastropoda
- Subclass: Caenogastropoda
- Order: Neogastropoda
- Family: Costellariidae
- Genus: Vexillum
- Species: V. semifasciatum

Binomial name
- Vexillum semifasciatum (Lamarck, 1811)

Synonyms
- Mitra rigida Swainson, 1821; Mitra semifasciata Lamarck, 1811 (basionym); Vexillum (Costellaria) semifasciatum (Lamarck, 1811) (alternate representation)

= Vexillum semifasciatum =

Species of gastropod

Vexillum semifasciatum, common name the half-banded mitre, is a species of small sea snail, marine gastropod mollusk in the family Costellariidae, the ribbed miters.

== Description ==
The length of the shell varies between 16 mm and 26 mm.

The shell is ovately oblong. The smooth spire is somewhat turreted. It is longitudinally rather concentrically ribbed with the axial ribs close set (sometimes with orange-red color), and thickened at the upper part. The sutures are deeply impressed. The 7-10 slightly convex whorls of the teleoconch are white cream or pale-ash colour above, yellowish red or ashy-blue beneath and encircled with two or three reddish-brown lines. The whorls of the protoconch are glassy brown. The base of the shell shows some faint spiral grooves. The smooth, thicked outer lip is narrow and convexly rounded. The dark brown or purplish columella is four-plaited. The siphonal canal is straight and contains many calluses.

== Distribution ==
This species occurs in the Indo-West and Central Pacific (with as type locality, the Indian Ocean); also off Papua New Guinea and Queensland, Australia.
