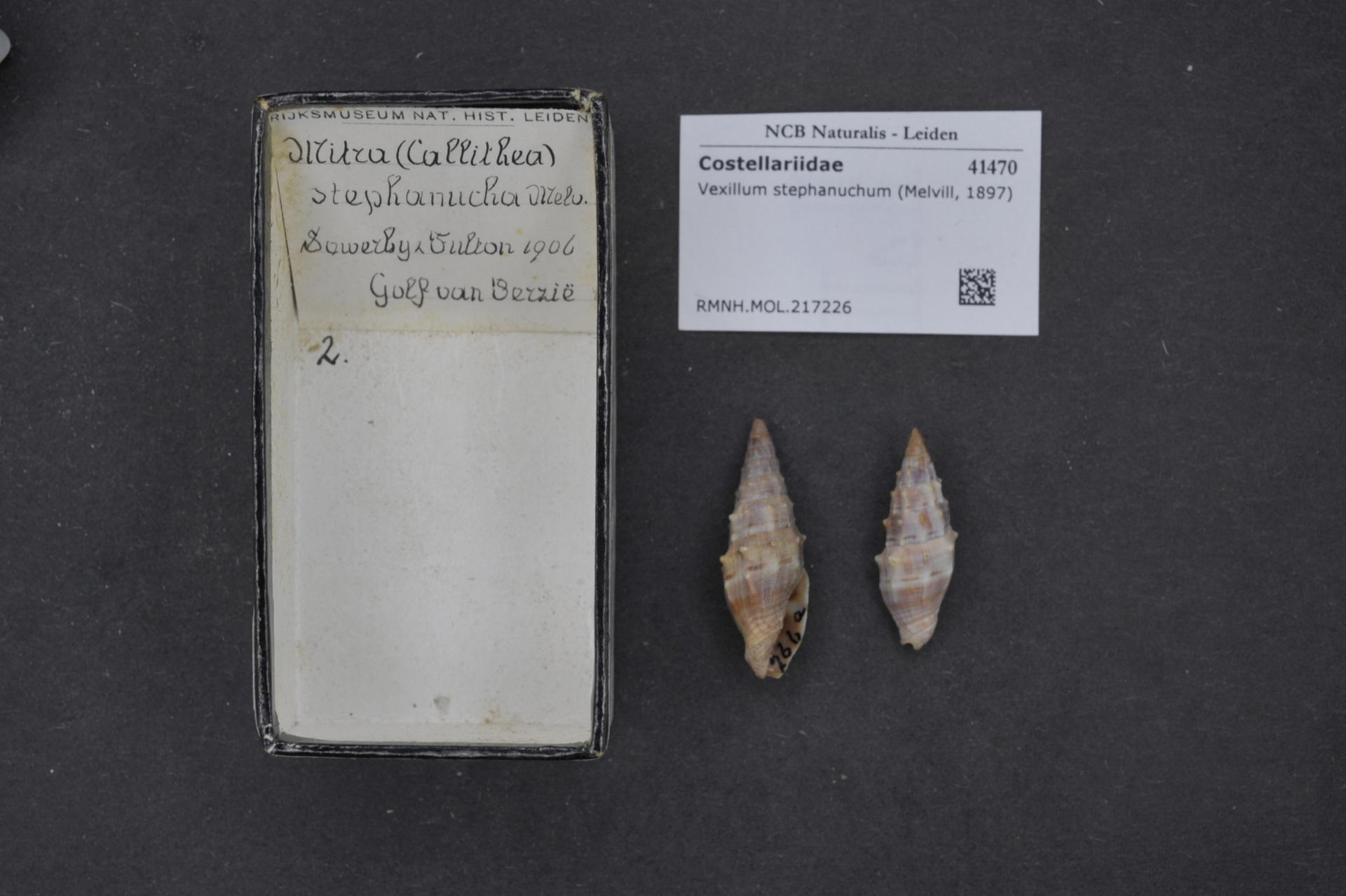
- Shell of Vexillum stephanuchum (specimen at Naturalis Biodiversity Center)

Scientific classification
- Kingdom: Animalia
- Phylum: Mollusca
- Class: Gastropoda
- Subclass: Caenogastropoda
- Order: Neogastropoda
- Superfamily: Turbinelloidea
- Family: Costellariidae
- Genus: Vexillum
- Species: V. stephanuchum

Binomial name
- Vexillum stephanuchum (Melvill, 1897)

Synonyms
- Mitra (Costellaria) stephanucha Melvill, 1897 (basionym); Vexillum stephanucha (Melvill, 1897) (incorrect gender ending)

= Vexillum stephanuchum =

Species of gastropod

Vexillum stephanuchum is a species of small sea snail, a marine gastropod mollusk in the family Costellariidae (the ribbed miters).

== Description ==
The length of the shell reaches 42 mm, its diameter 12 mm.

According to its original description, the large shell has an attenuate fusiform shape. Its colour is cinereous-red. The shell contains 14 gradated whorls and a sharp apex. These are smooth (to the naked eye), except where the spiral acutely noduled coronations encircle the upper part of the last five or six whorls. These coronations gradually get fainter and disappear altogether in the upper whorls, which are many-ribbed, with interstitial transverse liration. These lirae continue on the lower whorls, many-punctate, and the ribs on these last are fewer and very strongly marked. The oblong aperture is narrow. The outer lip is sharp. Inside it is striated. The columella is four-plaited.

== Distribution ==
This marine species occurs off Oman and in the Persian Gulf; also off Pakistan.
