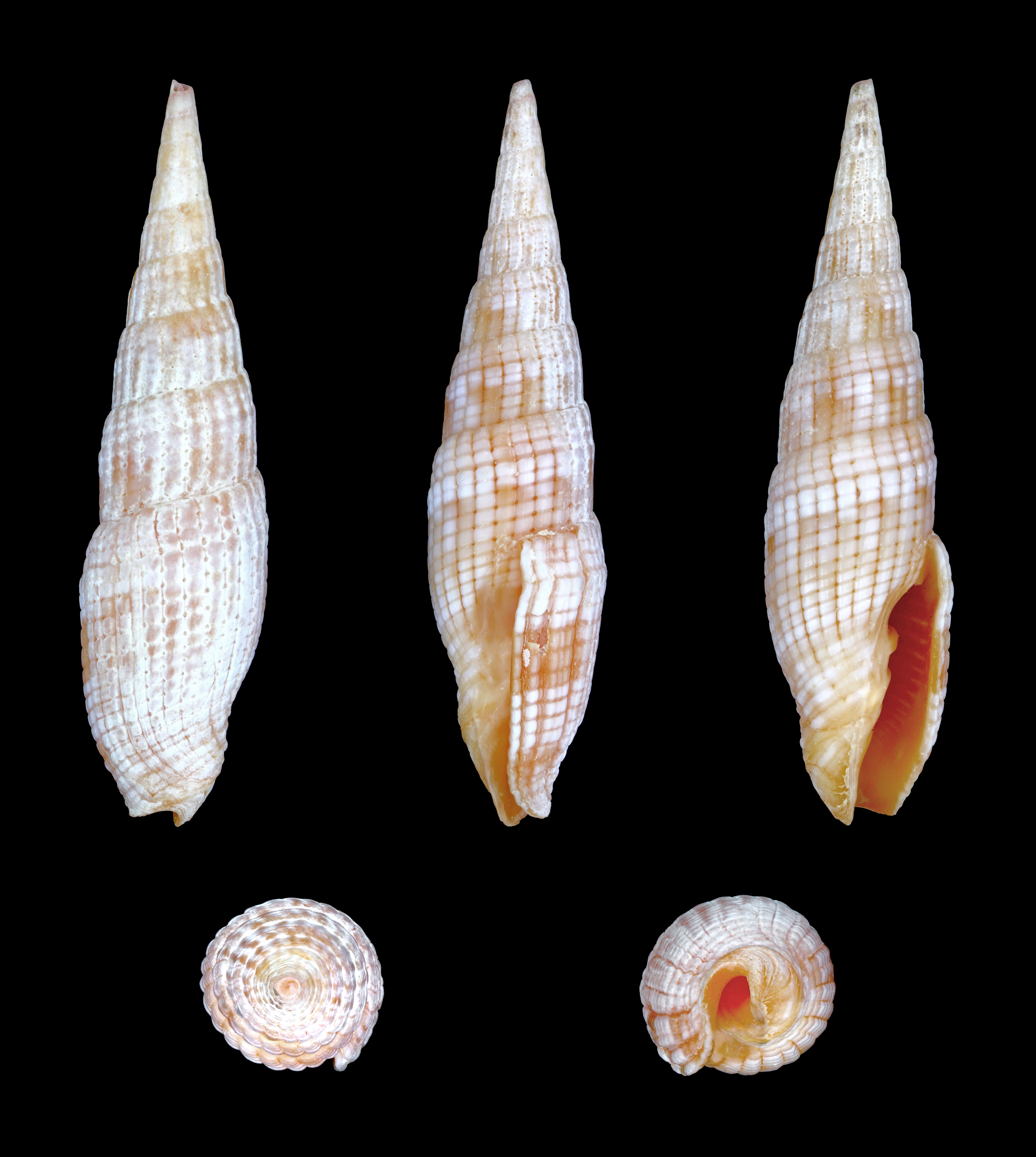

Scientific classification
- Kingdom: Animalia
- Phylum: Mollusca
- Class: Gastropoda
- Subclass: Caenogastropoda
- Order: Neogastropoda
- Superfamily: Turbinelloidea
- Family: Costellariidae
- Genus: Vexillum
- Species: V. costatum

Binomial name
- Vexillum costatum (Gmelin, 1791)

Synonyms
- Costellaria ignea W. Wood, 1828; Costellaria isaotakii J.T. Kuroda, 1961; Costellaria lanceolata (R.P.J. Hervier, 1897); Costellaria rosea (L.A. Reeve, 1845); Costellaria subulata J.B.P.A. Lamarck, 1811; Costellaria terebralis W.J. Broderip, 1836; Costellaria vitellina (A.A. Gould, 1850à; Mitra vitellina Gould, A.A. 1850; Mitra (Costellaria) lanceolata Hervier, J. 1897; Mitra rosea Reeve, L.A. 1845; Mitra subulata Lamarck, 1811; Tiara terebralis Broderip, 1836; Vexillum (Costellaria) costatum (Gmelin, 1791); Voluta costata Gmelin, 1791; Voluta ignea Wood, W. 1828

= Vexillum costatum =

Species of gastropod

Vexillum costatum is a species of small sea snail. It is a marine gastropod mollusk in the family Costellariidae, the ribbed miters.

== Description ==
The length of the shell varies between 21 mm and 49 mm.

== Distribution ==
The species is found in the tropical Pacific from the Philippines to Polynesia; also off Australia (Queensland).
