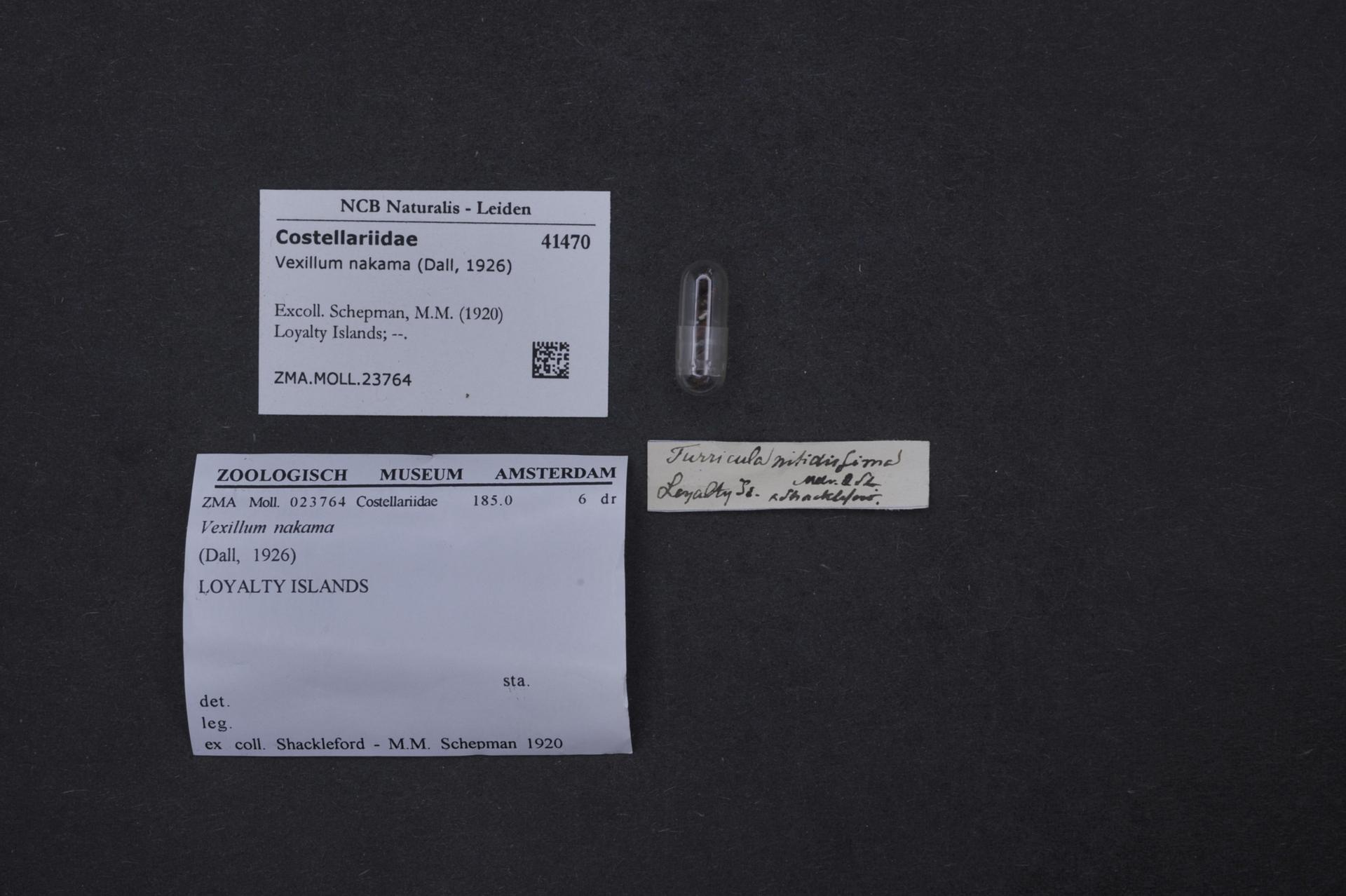
- Shell of Vexillum nakama (specimen at Naturalis Biodiversity Center)

Scientific classification
- Kingdom: Animalia
- Phylum: Mollusca
- Class: Gastropoda
- Subclass: Caenogastropoda
- Order: Neogastropoda
- Superfamily: Turbinelloidea
- Family: Costellariidae
- Genus: Vexillum
- Species: V. nakama

Binomial name
- Vexillum nakama (Dall, 1926)

Synonyms
- Mitra nakama Dall, 1926 (original combination); Pusia nakama (Dall, 1926); Vexillum (Pusia) nakama (Dall, 1926)

= Vexillum nakama =

Species of gastropod

Vexillum nakama is a species of small sea snail, marine gastropod mollusk in the family Costellariidae, the ribbed miters.

== Description ==
The length of the shell attains 7 mm, its diameter 3 mm.

(Original description) The minute shell is black, with a paler band at the posterior edge of the body whorl and a half. The shell contains about six whorls. The protoconch is smooth and somewhat irregularly swollen. The suture is closely appressed. The axial sculpture consists of about 20 narrow low threadlike ribs with subequal interspaces. The spiral sculpture consists of faint obsolescent striae between the ribs and two or three threads on the siphonal canal. The aperture is narrow. The outer lip is sharp. The aperture is blackish. The columella has three dark plaits. The siphonal canal is hardly differentiated.

== Distribution ==
This marine species occurs off Japan.
