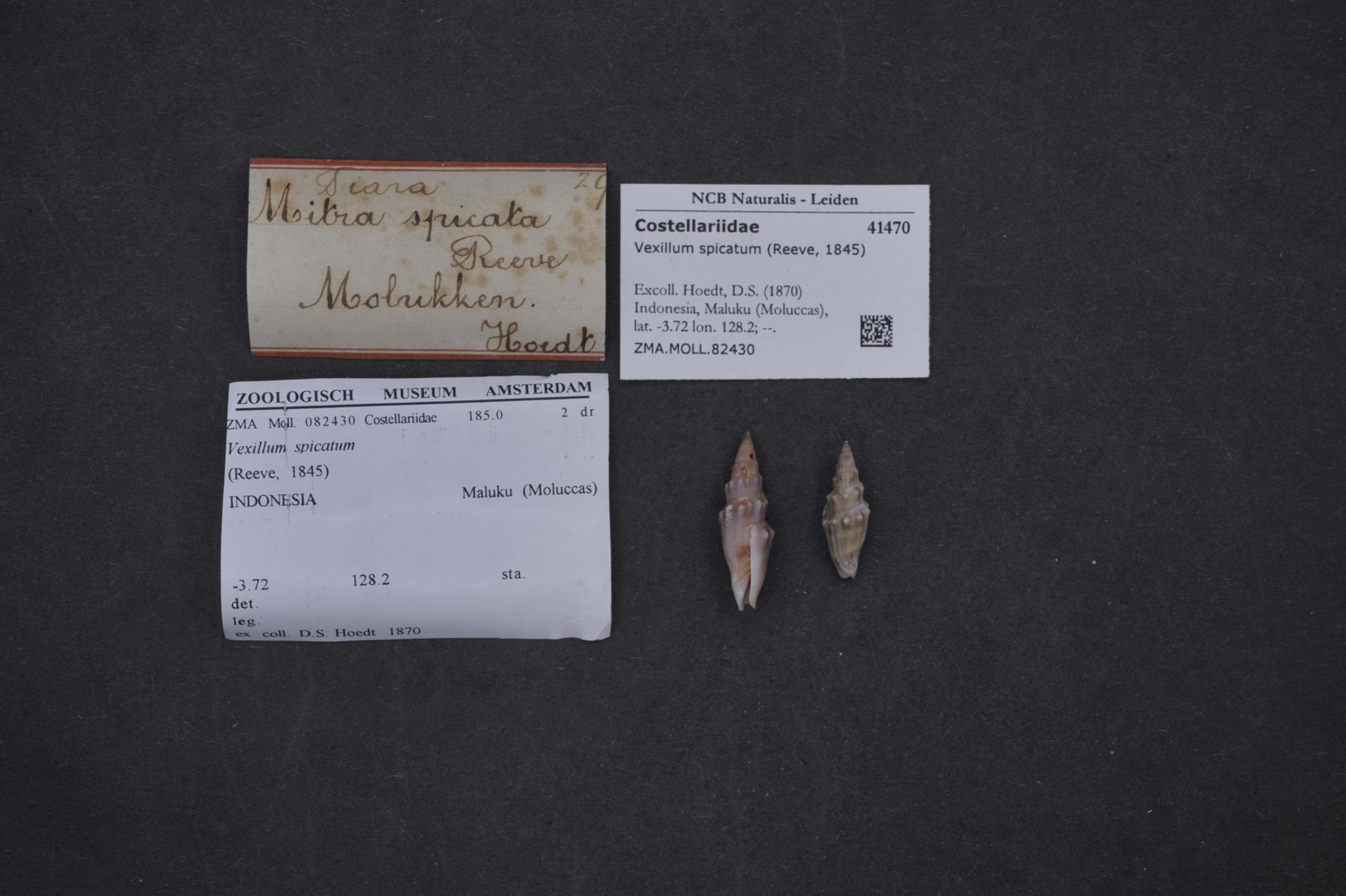
- Shell of Vexillum spicatum (specimen at Naturalis Biodiversity Center) -

Scientific classification
- Kingdom: Animalia
- Phylum: Mollusca
- Class: Gastropoda
- Subclass: Caenogastropoda
- Order: Neogastropoda
- Superfamily: Turbinelloidea
- Family: Costellariidae
- Genus: Vexillum
- Species: V. spicatum

Binomial name
- Vexillum spicatum (Reeve, 1845)

Synonyms
- Mitra spicata Reeve, 1845 (original combination); Vexillum (Costellaria) spicatum (Reeve, 1845); Vexillum fusiformis (L.A. Reeve, 1845)

= Vexillum spicatum =

Species of gastropod

Vexillum spicatum, common name the spiked mitre, is a species of small sea snail, marine gastropod mollusk in the family Costellariidae, the ribbed miters.

== Description ==
The length of the shell attains 19.5 mm.

(Original description) The shell is fusiform with the spire acuminately turreted. The whorls are longitudinally closely ribbed, sharply angled at the upper part. The ribs are tubercularly noduled on the angle. The body whorl is faintly noduled round the middle with the ribs nearly obsolete. The shell has a pale fulvous colour. The columella is four-plaited.

The upper whorls of this shell are longitudinally finely ribbed, but there is very slight indication of ribs upon the lower.

== Distribution ==
This marine species occurs off the Philippines and Papua New Guinea.
