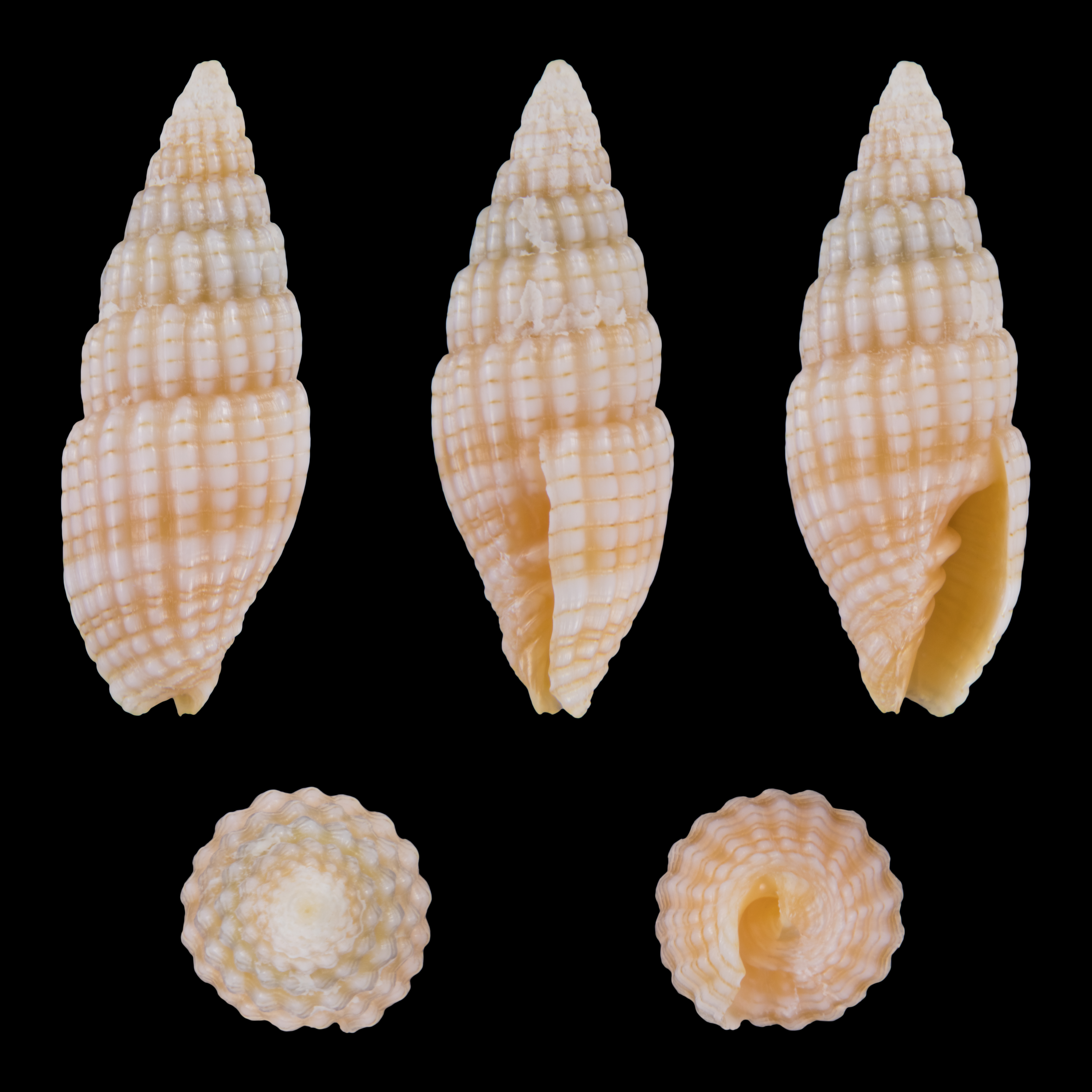

Scientific classification
- Kingdom: Animalia
- Phylum: Mollusca
- Class: Gastropoda
- Subclass: Caenogastropoda
- Order: Neogastropoda
- Family: Costellariidae
- Genus: Vexillum
- Species: V. infaustum

Binomial name
- Vexillum infaustum (Reeve, 1845)

Synonyms
- Mitra fulvosulcata Melvill, 1888 junior subjective synonym; Pusia fulvosulcata J.C. Melvill, 1889; Mitra infausta Reeve, 1845 (original combination); Vexillum (Pusia) infaustum (Reeve, 1845); Vexillum fulvosulcatum (Melvill, 1888) ·

= Vexillum infaustum =

Species of gastropod

Vexillum infaustum, common name the unlucky mitre, is a species of small sea snail, marine gastropod mollusk in the family Costellariidae, the ribbed miters.

== Description ==
The length of the shell attains 14 mm, its diameter 6 mm.

(Original description) The ovate shell is rather solid. It is longitudinally ribbed in a waved manner, transversely impressly striated. The shell has a fleshy straw colour, the impressed striae faintly stained here and there with reddish brown. The columella is three-plaited.

(Described as Mitra fulvosulcata) The ovate shell is solid. The spire is somewhat acuminate. The whorls are longitudinally ribbed. The ribs are numerous, rounded, transversely furrowed, the furrows being tawny coloured, especially conspicuous on the ribs. The columella is four-plicate.

== Distribution ==
This marine species occurs off Mauritius.
