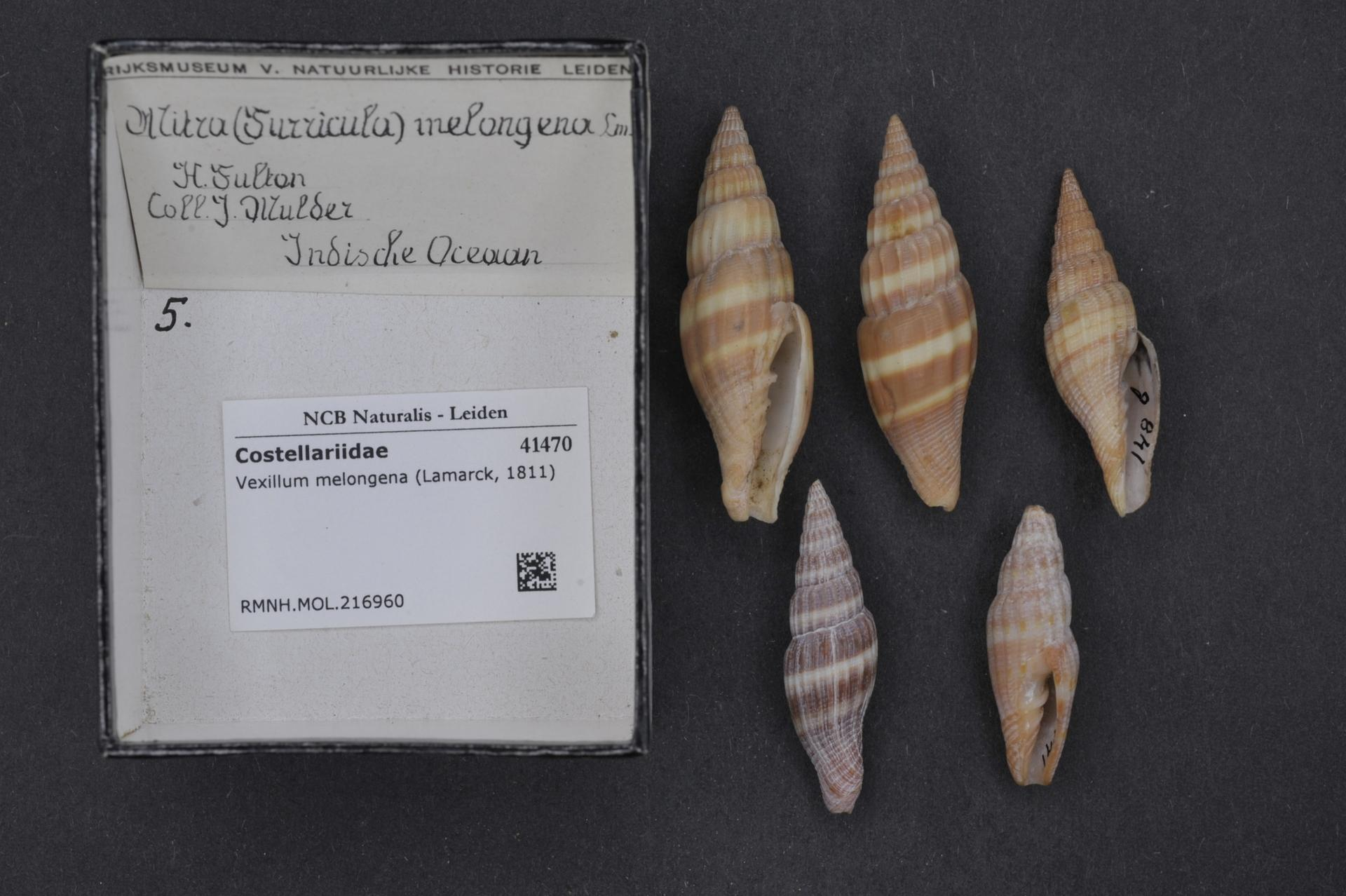
- Vexillum melongena (specimen at Naturalis Biodiversity Center)

Scientific classification
- Kingdom: Animalia
- Phylum: Mollusca
- Class: Gastropoda
- Subclass: Caenogastropoda
- Order: Neogastropoda
- Superfamily: Turbinelloidea
- Family: Costellariidae
- Genus: Vexillum
- Species: V. melongena

Binomial name
- Vexillum melongena (Lamarck, 1811)

Synonyms
- Mitra melongena Lamarck, 1811 (original combination); Vexillum (Vexillum) melongena (Lamarck, 1811) ·

= Vexillum melongena =

Species of gastropod

Vexillum melongena is a species of small sea snail, marine gastropod mollusk in the family Costellariidae, the ribbed miters.

== Description ==
The length of the shell attains 58 mm.

The narrow, fusiform shell has a high spire. It contains eight whorls. It shows strong longitudinal ribs with weak spiral ridges that don't cross the ribs. The blue-white aperture is narrow. It is edged with purple brown. The outer lip is lirate. The pale brown columella has four white plaits. The siphonal canal is open and extended.

The color of the shell is chocolate brown or ash and white, in revolving bands and lines of variable thickness.

== Distribution ==
This marine species occurs off the Philippines, the South China Sea, Singapore to Fiji, Papua New Guinea and Australia.
