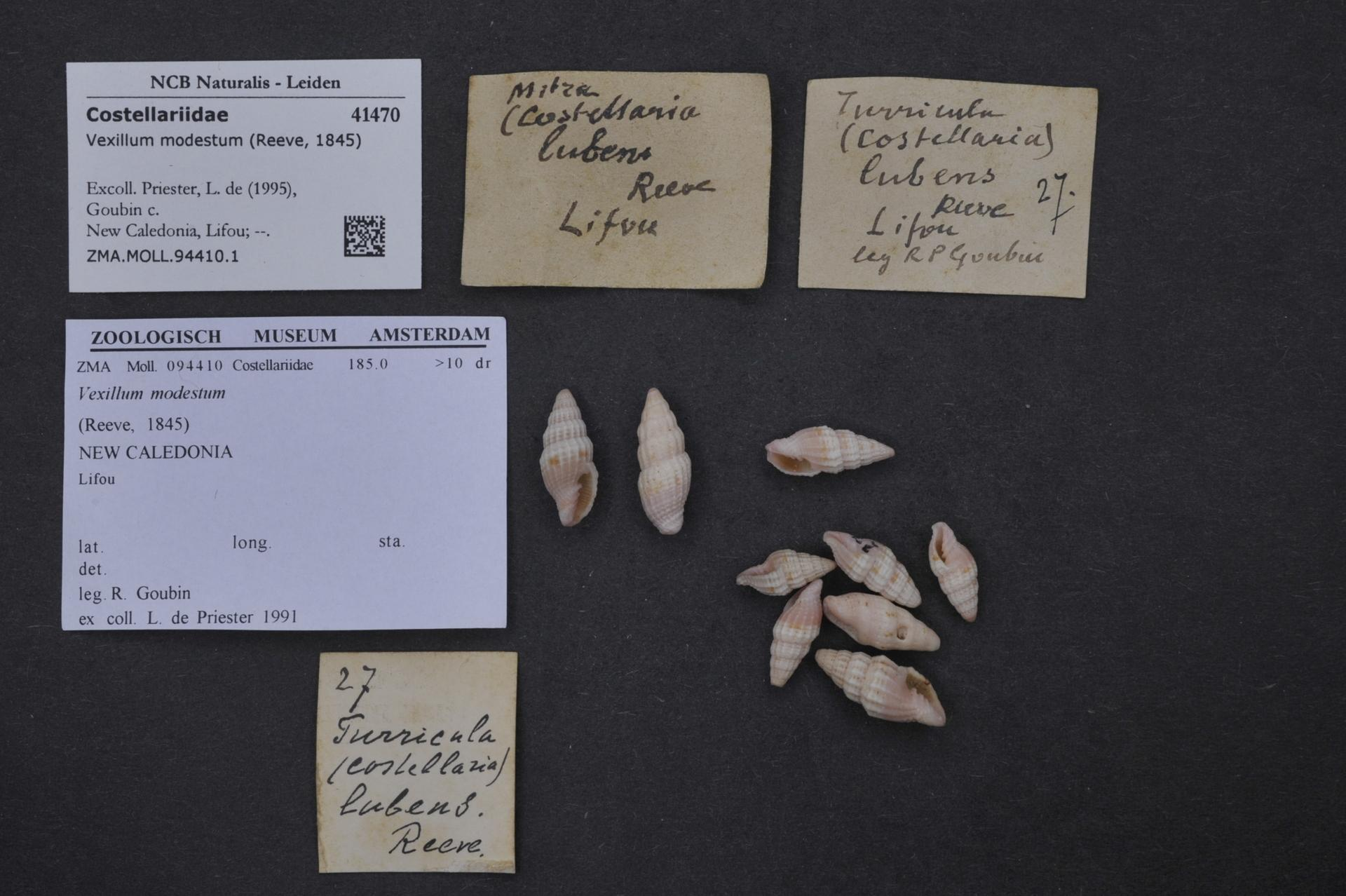
- Shell of Vexillum modestum (specimen at Naturalis Biodiversity Center)

Scientific classification
- Kingdom: Animalia
- Phylum: Mollusca
- Class: Gastropoda
- Subclass: Caenogastropoda
- Order: Neogastropoda
- Family: Costellariidae
- Genus: Vexillum
- Species: V. modestum

Binomial name
- Vexillum modestum (Reeve, 1845)

Synonyms
- Mitra compta A. Adams, 1853; Mitra lubens Reeve, 1845 junior subjective synonym; Mitra modesta Reeve, 1845 (original combination); Vexillum (Costellaria) modestum (Reeve, 1845); Vexillum lubens (Reeve, 1845) junior subjective synonym

= Vexillum modestum =

Species of gastropod

Vexillum modestum, common name the modest mitre, is a species of small sea snail, marine gastropod mollusk in the family Costellariidae, the ribbed miters.

== Description ==
The length of the shell attains 17 mm.

(Original description) The shell is somewhat fusiformly ovate, contracted at the base, with the spire turreted. The whorls are rounded, longitudinally ribbed with the interstices transversely cancellately impressed. The shell is snowy white, very palely stained towards the base with pink. The columella is four-plaited. The interior of the aperture is pink.

== Distribution ==
This marine species occurs off the Philippines and Guam.
