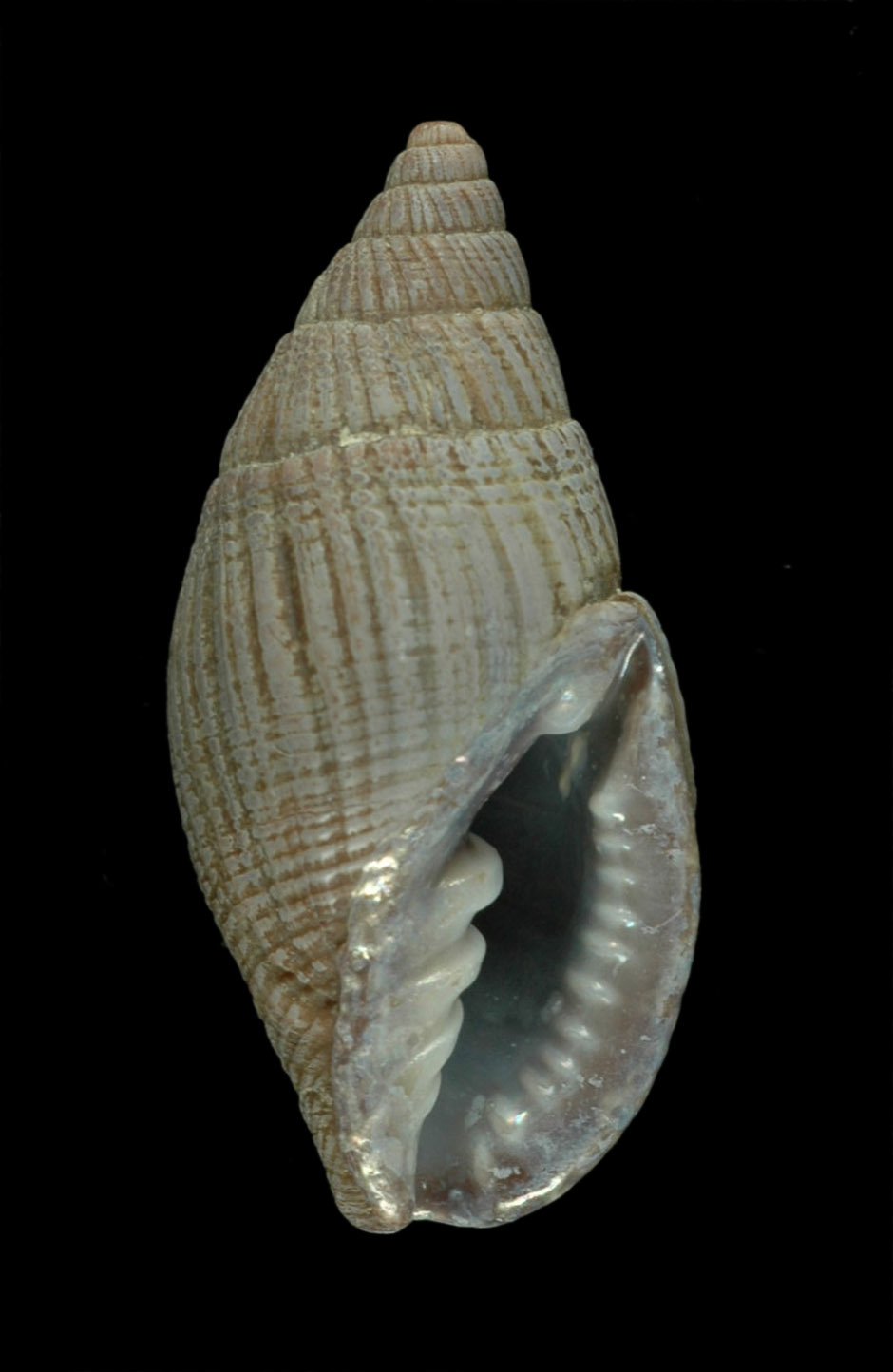
- Shell of Vexillum woldemarii (specimen at MNHN, Paris)

Scientific classification
- Kingdom: Animalia
- Phylum: Mollusca
- Class: Gastropoda
- Subclass: Caenogastropoda
- Order: Neogastropoda
- Superfamily: Turbinelloidea
- Family: Costellariidae
- Genus: Vexillum
- Species: V. woldemarii

Binomial name
- Vexillum woldemarii (Kiener, 1838)

Synonyms
- Mitra aethiops Reeve, 1845; Mitra choava Reeve, 1844; Mitra creniplicata A. Adams, 1853; Mitra woldemarii Kiener, 1838; Zierliana woldemarii (Kiener, 1838)

= Vexillum woldemarii =

Species of gastropod

Vexillum woldemarii, common name the coffee-berry mitre, is a species of sea snail, a marine gastropod mollusk, in the family Costellariidae, the ribbed miters.

== Description ==
The length of the shell attains 24 mm.

(Described as Mitra choava) The ovate shell is solid and smooth. The spire is short. The shell is blackish-brown, the plaits are white. The columella is concave, armed with a callosity, four-plaited. The outer lip is peculiarly flattened and canaliculated at the upper part, crenulated within.

== Distribution ==
This marine species occurs off the Philippines and Papua New Guinea.
