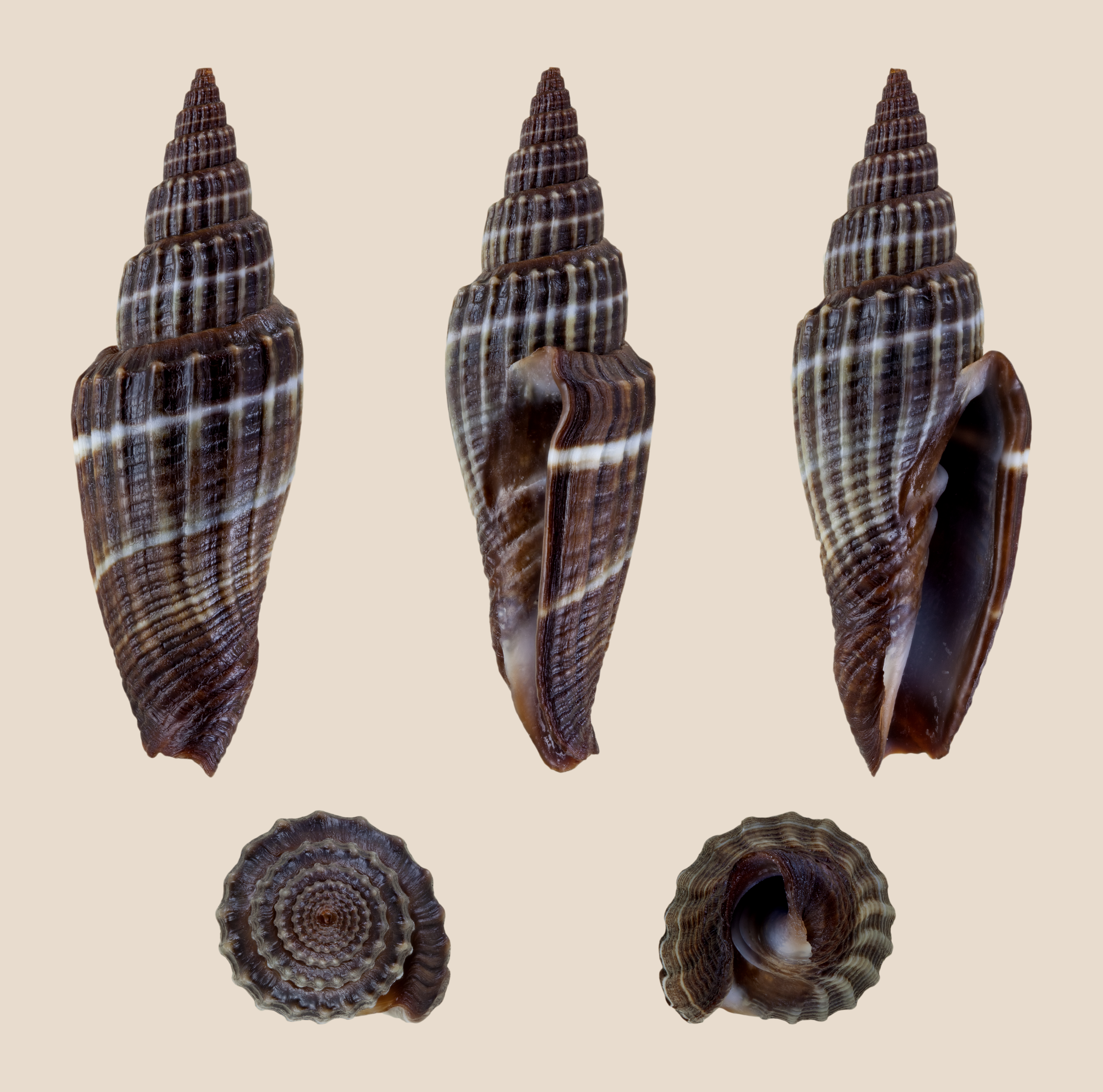
- Vexillum subdivisum

Scientific classification
- Kingdom: Animalia
- Phylum: Mollusca
- Class: Gastropoda
- Subclass: Caenogastropoda
- Order: Neogastropoda
- Superfamily: Turbinelloidea
- Family: Costellariidae
- Genus: Vexillum
- Species: V. subdivisum

Binomial name
- Vexillum subdivisum (Gmelin, 1791)

Synonyms
- Mitra costellaris Lamarck, 1811; Mitra nigrina Lamarck, J.B.P.A. de, 1811; Vexillum (Vexillum) subdivisum (Gmelin, 1791); Voluta subdivisa Gmelin, 1791 (original combination)

= Vexillum subdivisum =

Species of gastropod

Vexillum subdivisum, common name : the Costate Mitre, is a species of small sea snail, marine gastropod mollusk in the family Costellariidae, the ribbed miters.

== Description ==
The shell size varies between 30 mm and 60 mm.

The shell is dark chocolate, with a superior narrow white band, and occasionally an obscure, wider, lower one.

== Distribution ==
This species occurs in the Indo-West Pacific: in the Indian Ocean off Mauritius and in the Pacific Ocean off the Solomon Islands, off the Philippines and Java; in the South China Sea; off Australia (Queensland), Papua New Guinea and Okinawa.
