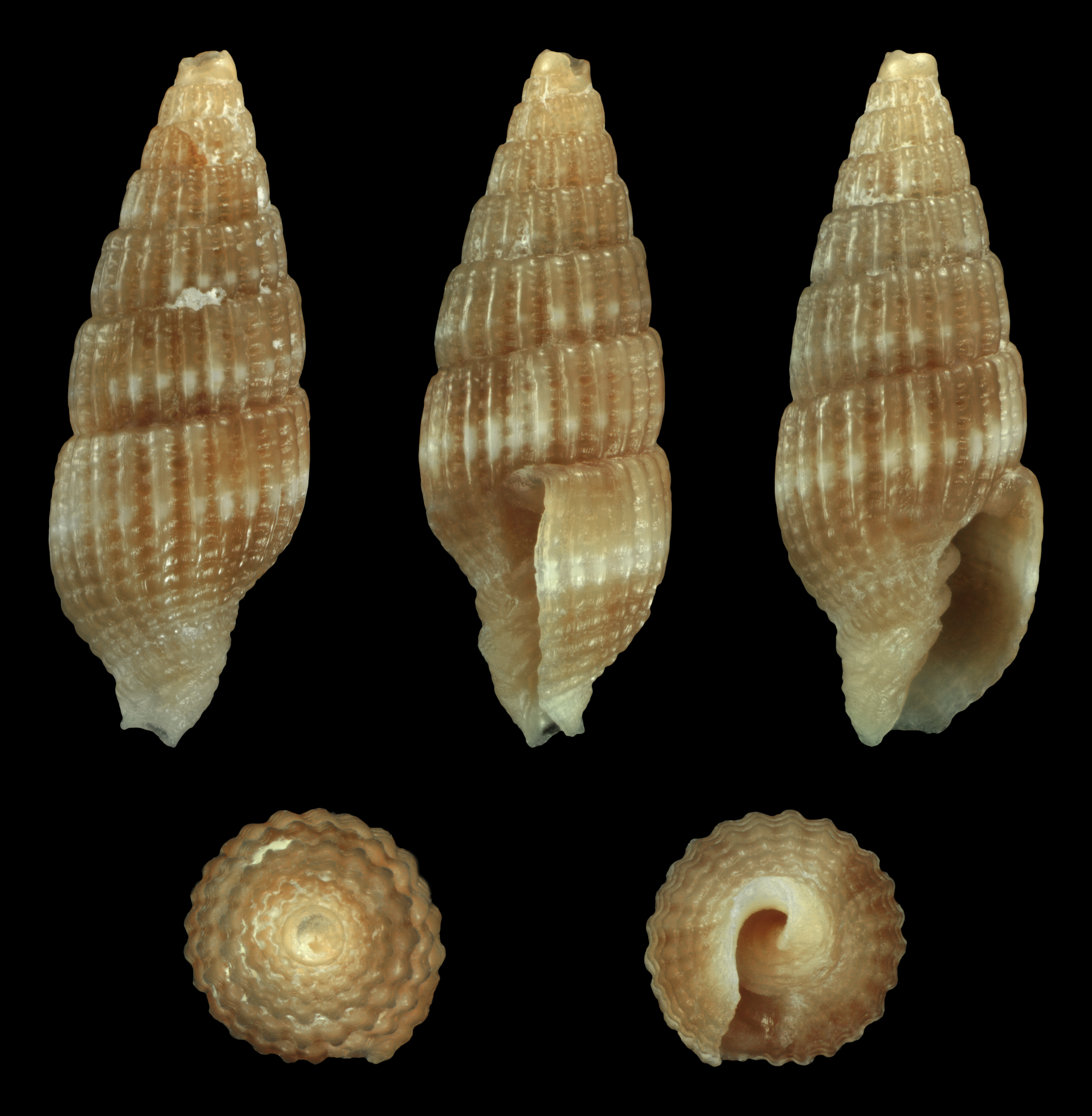
- Shell of Vexillum micra

Scientific classification
- Kingdom: Animalia
- Phylum: Mollusca
- Class: Gastropoda
- Subclass: Caenogastropoda
- Order: Neogastropoda
- Superfamily: Turbinelloidea
- Family: Costellariidae
- Genus: Vexillum
- Species: V. micra

Binomial name
- Vexillum micra (Pilsbry, 1921)

Synonyms
- Mitra elima Dall MS J. Cate, 1963; Vexillum (Costellaria) micra Pilsbry, 1921 ·

= Vexillum micra =

Species of gastropod

Vexillum micra is a species of small sea snail, marine gastropod mollusk in the family Costellariidae, the ribbed miters.

== Description ==
The length of the shell varies between 5 mm and 9 mm.

(Original description) The shell is fusiform, vinaceous tawny with a band at the periphery and another on the base of burnt umber. The sculpture consists of many vertical rounded ribs, about 30 on the body whorl, the intervals with wide, low spiral cords separated by impressed lines, of which there are 4 on the penultimate whorl. The base of the shell has spiral cords. The aperture is colored like the outside. The columella contains four plaits. The embryonic shell is long-conic, of about 3½ smooth whorls.

== Distribution ==
This marine species occurs off South Africa and the Philippines.
