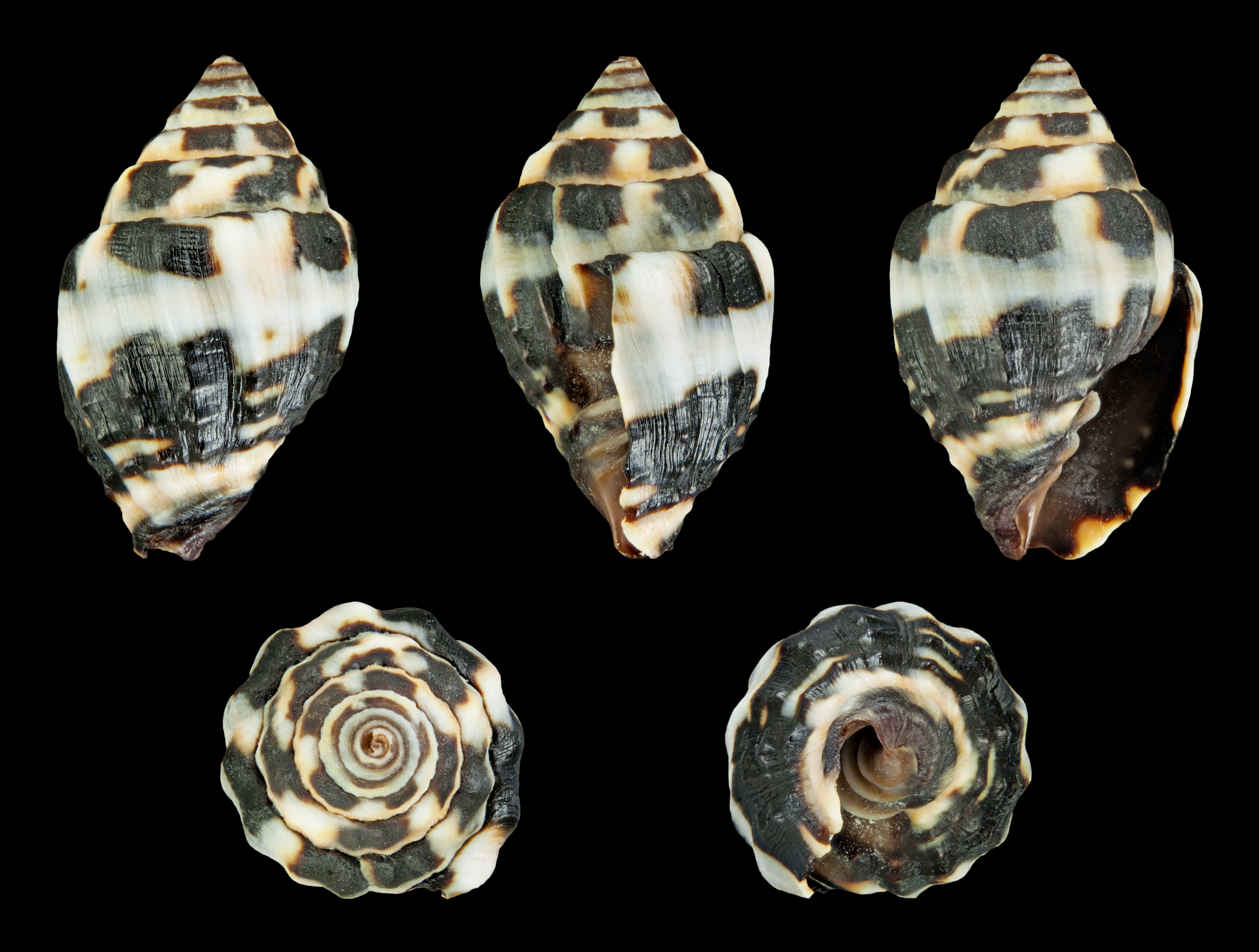
- Shell of Vexillum pisolinum

Scientific classification
- Kingdom: Animalia
- Phylum: Mollusca
- Class: Gastropoda
- Subclass: Caenogastropoda
- Order: Neogastropoda
- Superfamily: Turbinelloidea
- Family: Costellariidae
- Genus: Vexillum
- Species: V. pisolinum

Binomial name
- Vexillum pisolinum (Lamarck, 1811)

Synonyms
- Mitra cremans Reeve, 1845; Mitra pisolina Lamarck, 1811 (original combination); Pusia pisolinum (J.B.P.A. Lamarck, 1811); Pusia timorensis W.L.H. Dohrn, 1864; Vexillum (Pusia) pisolinum (Lamarck, 1811)

= Vexillum pisolinum =

Species of gastropod

Vexillum pisolinum is a species of small sea snail, marine gastropod mollusk in the family Costellariidae, the ribbed miters.

== Description ==
The length of the shell attains 13 mm.

(Described as Mitra cremans) The stoutly ovate shell has a short spire. The sutures are slightly impressed. The shell is smooth, granose towards the base, longitudinally rather obliquely plaited. It is very dark black, variegated here and there with reddish orange names. The columella is three-plaited.

== Distribution ==
This marine species occurs in the Western Pacific; also off the Philippines and Australia (Queensland).
