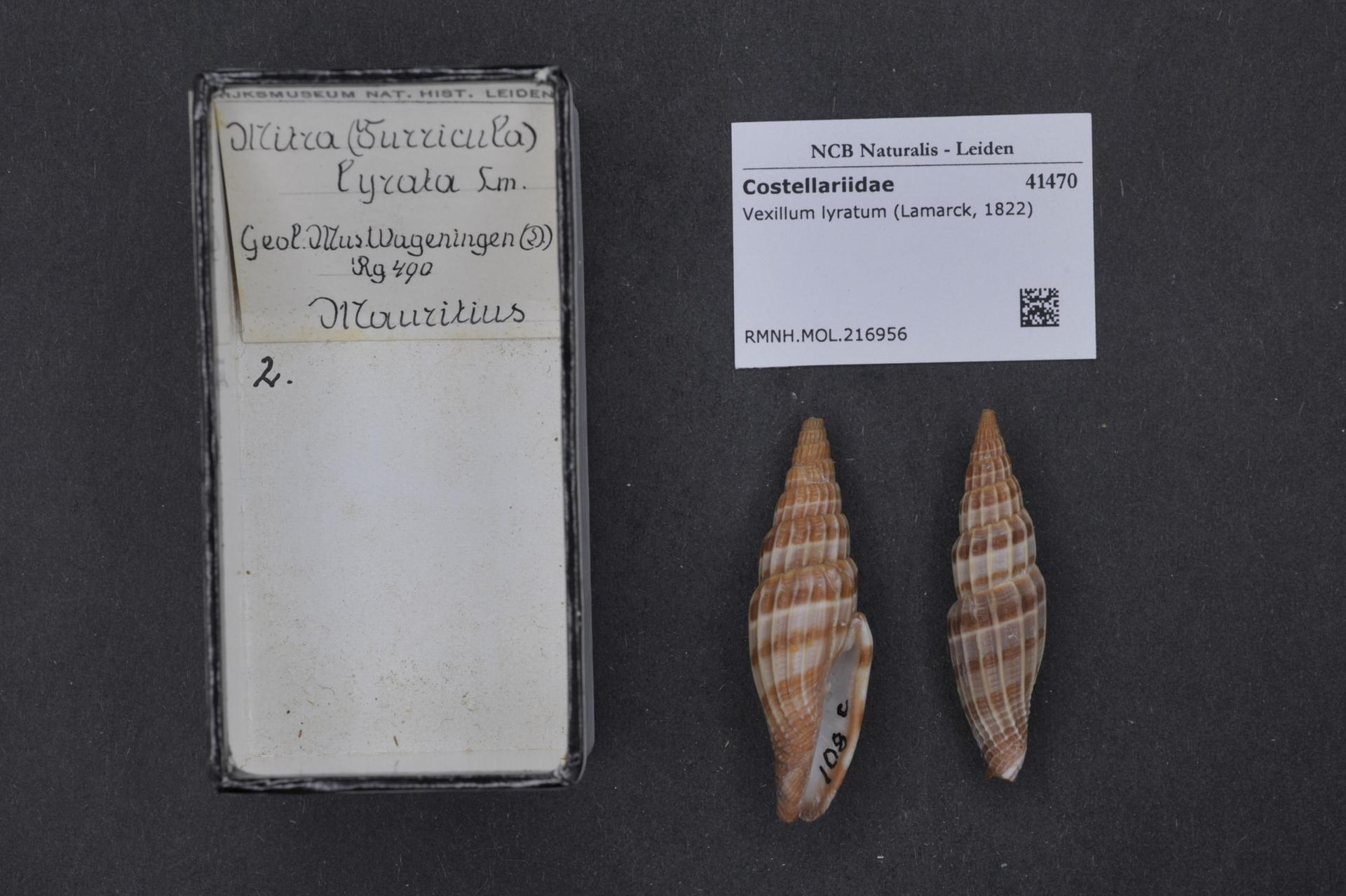
- Shell of Vexillum lyratum (specimen at Naturalis Biodiversity Center)

Scientific classification
- Kingdom: Animalia
- Phylum: Mollusca
- Class: Gastropoda
- Subclass: Caenogastropoda
- Order: Neogastropoda
- Superfamily: Turbinelloidea
- Family: Costellariidae
- Genus: Vexillum
- Species: V. lyratum

Binomial name
- Vexillum lyratum (Lamarck, 1822)

Synonyms
- Mitra lyrata Lamarck, 1822 (original combination); Turricula lyrata (Lamarck, 1822); Vexillum (Vexillum) lyratum (Lamarck, 1822)

= Vexillum lyratum =

Species of gastropod

Vexillum lyratum is a species of small sea snail, marine gastropod mollusk in the family Costellariidae, the ribbed miters.

== Description ==
The length of the shell attains 55 mm.

The ribs are narrow and sharp. The color of the shell is light olive or ash, with narrow dark chocolate or blackish revolving bauds.

== Distribution ==
This marine species occurs in the Indo-West Pacific off Madagascar, Thailand, Vietnam, the Philippines, Indonesia, the South China Sea; also off Papua New Guinea and Australia (Northern Territory, Queensland).
