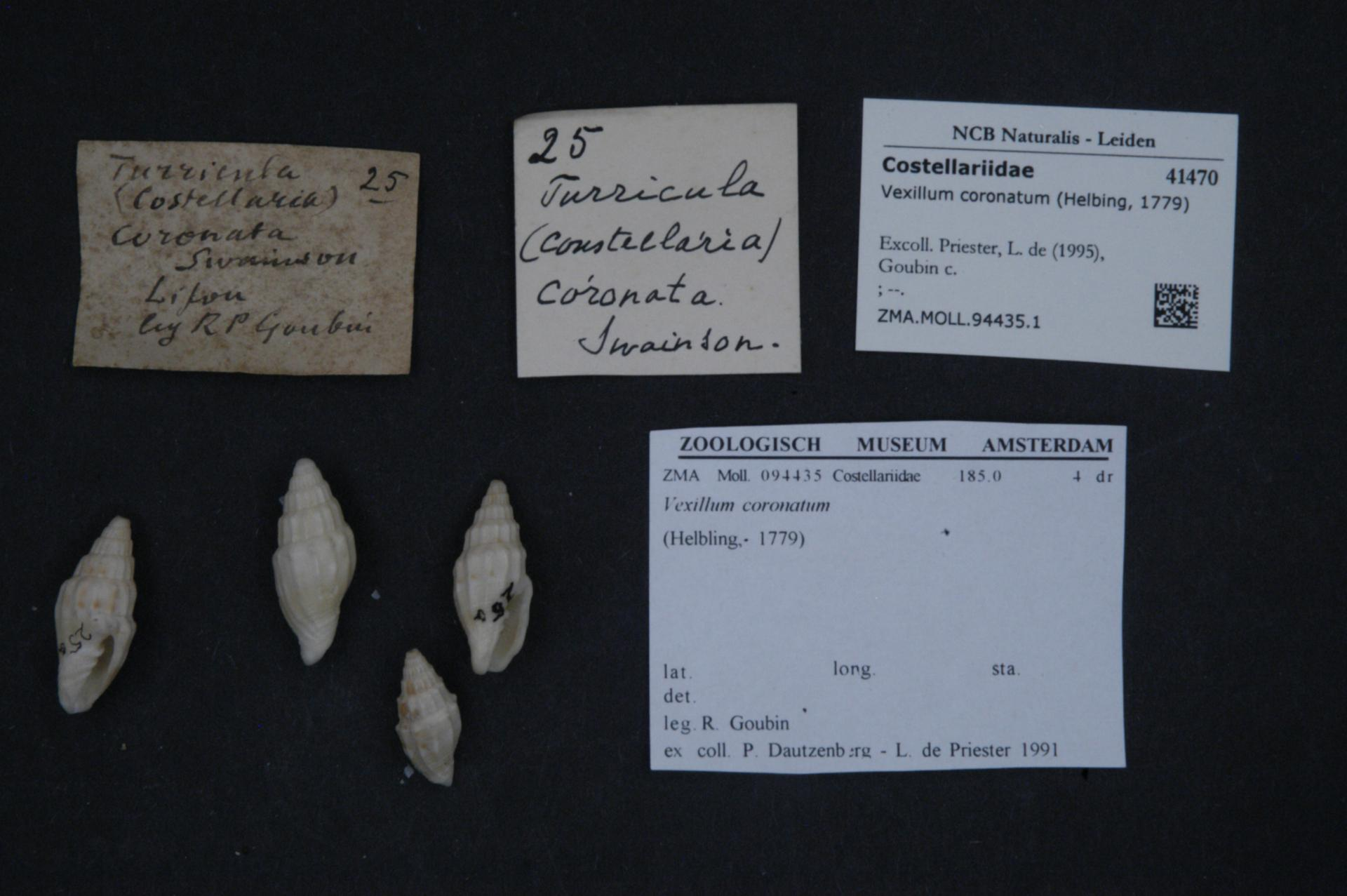
- Vexillum coronatum (specimen at Naturalis Biodiversity Center)

Scientific classification
- Kingdom: Animalia
- Phylum: Mollusca
- Class: Gastropoda
- Subclass: Caenogastropoda
- Order: Neogastropoda
- Family: Costellariidae
- Genus: Vexillum
- Species: V. coronatum

Binomial name
- Vexillum coronatum (Helbling, 1779)

Synonyms
- Mitra nodilirata A. Adams, 1853; Mitra (Costellaria) nodilirata Melvill & Standen, 1895; Mitra (Costellaria) stephanucha astephana ^{Melvill, 1904}; Turricula (Costellaria) mucronata Tryon, 1882; Vexillum (Costellaria) coronatum (Helbling, 1779); Voluta coronata Helbling, 1779

= Vexillum coronatum =

Species of gastropod

Vexillum coronatum is a species of small sea snail, marine gastropod mollusk in the family Costellariidae, the ribbed miters.

== Description ==
The length of the shell varies between 15 mm and 26 mm.

== Distribution ==
This marine species occurs off the Fiji Islands, Guam, the Loyalty Islands and New Caledonia.
