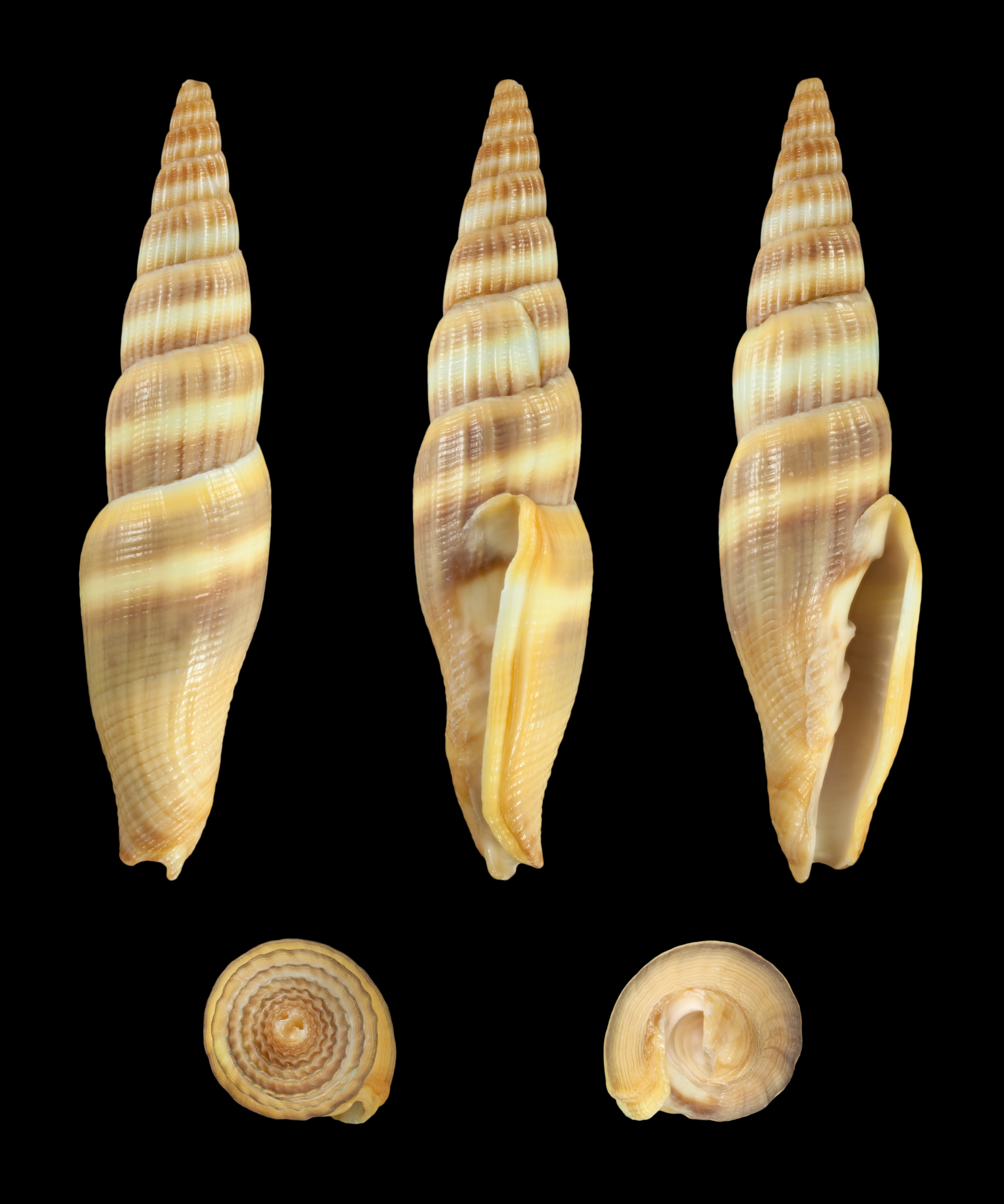
- Shell of Vexillum coccineum

Scientific classification
- Kingdom: Animalia
- Phylum: Mollusca
- Class: Gastropoda
- Subclass: Caenogastropoda
- Order: Neogastropoda
- Superfamily: Turbinelloidea
- Family: Costellariidae
- Genus: Vexillum
- Species: V. coccineum

Binomial name
- Vexillum coccineum (Reeve, 1844)

Synonyms
- Mitra coccinea Reeve, 1844; Vexillum (Vexillum) coccineum (Reeve, 1844)

= Vexillum coccineum =

Species of gastropod

Vexillum coccineum is a species of small sea snail, marine gastropod mollusk in the family Costellariidae, the ribbed miters.

== Description ==
The length of the shell varies between 58 and 76 mm (2.3 and 3.0 in).

(Original description) The shell is elongately fusiform. The spire is acuminated. The whorls are longitudinally obtusely ribbed, interstices transversely elevately striated. The ribs of the last whorls are somewhat indistinct. The shell is bright scarlet encircled by a simple white belt. The columella is four-plaited.

== Distribution ==
This marine species occurs off the Philippines, Indonesia, Taiwan, Japan; in the South China Sea.
