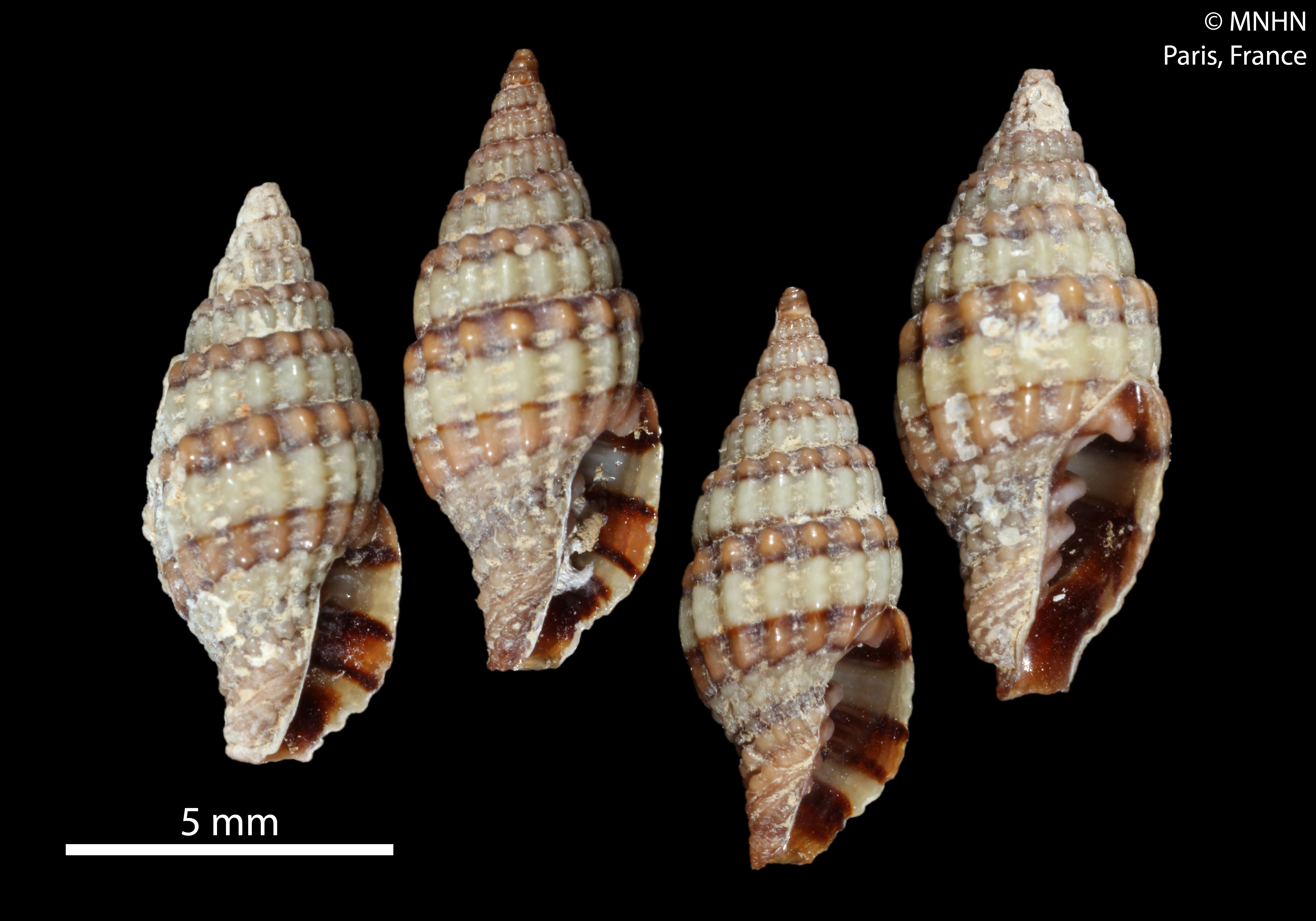
- Shell of Vexillum kuiperi (paratype at MNHN, Paris)

Scientific classification
- Kingdom: Animalia
- Phylum: Mollusca
- Class: Gastropoda
- Subclass: Caenogastropoda
- Order: Neogastropoda
- Family: Costellariidae
- Genus: Vexillum
- Species: V. kuiperi

Binomial name
- Vexillum kuiperi Turner, 2006

= Vexillum kuiperi =

Species of sea snail

Vexillum kuiperi is a species of small sea snail, marine gastropod mollusk in the family Costellariidae, the ribbed miters. This genus is not monophyletic, instead it contains 80% of costellariid diversity.

== Description ==
The length of the shell attains 7 mm. The color of the shell is typically a reddish orange and cream striped shell. The Vexillum species produces a complex venoms dominated by highly diversified short cysteine-rich peptides, vexitoxins, related to conotoxins.

== Distribution ==
This marine species occurs off Guam and New Caledonia. They are typically found in an aquatic environment, spcecifically in tropical and temperate seas. These specimens are rare in Kwajalein. They are found under rocks or in caves at night. They are also found at seaward reefs at depths of 13-20cm.
