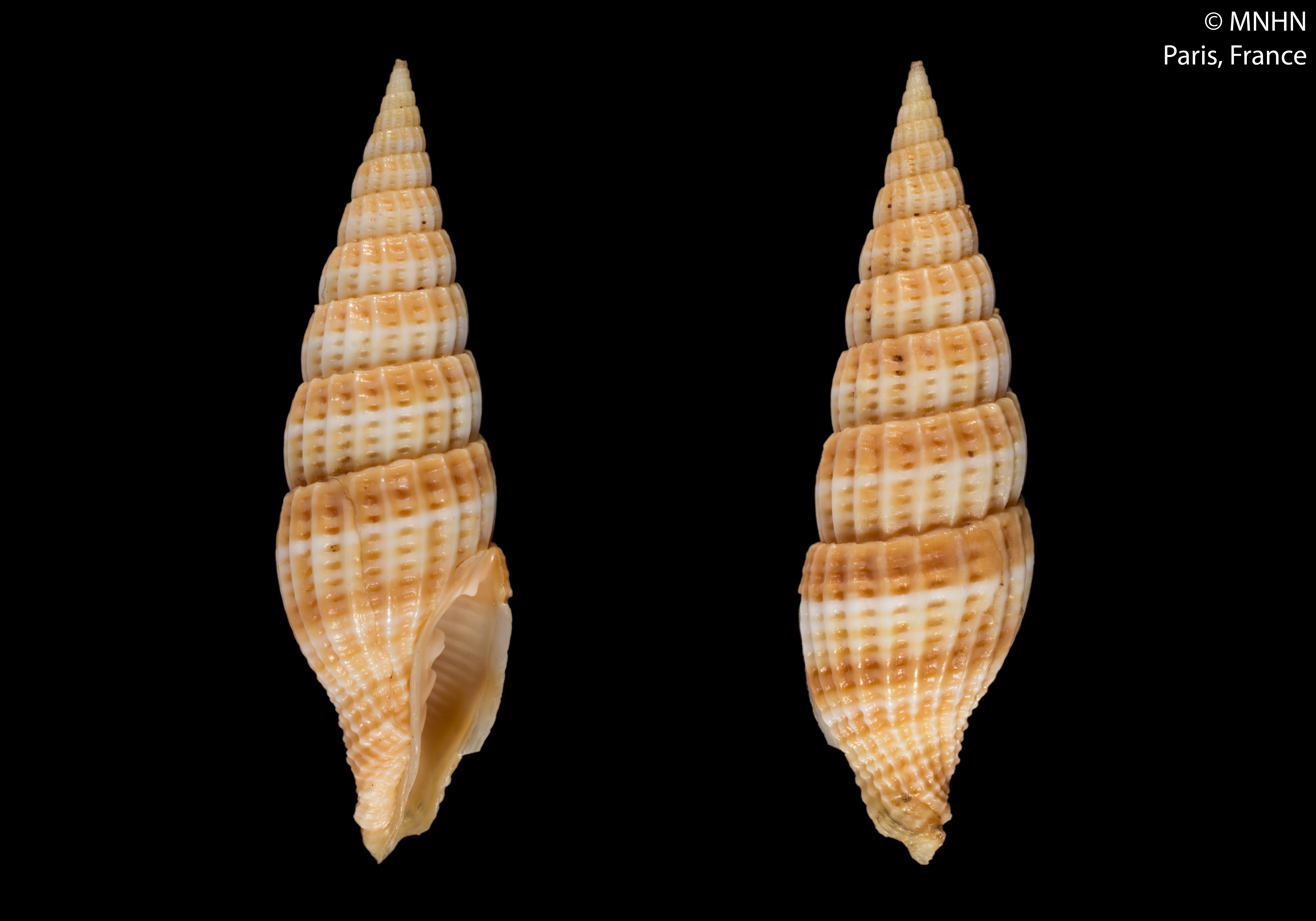
- shell of Vexillum jackylenae (holotype at MNHN, Paris)

Scientific classification
- Kingdom: Animalia
- Phylum: Mollusca
- Class: Gastropoda
- Subclass: Caenogastropoda
- Order: Neogastropoda
- Superfamily: Turbinelloidea
- Family: Costellariidae
- Genus: Vexillum
- Species: V. jackylenae

Binomial name
- Vexillum jackylenae Salisbury & Guillot de Suduiraut, 2006

= Vexillum jackylenae =

Species of gastropod

Vexillum jackylenae is a species of small sea snail, marine gastropod mollusk in the family Costellariidae, the ribbed miters.

== Description ==
Vexillum jackylenae is characterized by its elongated, ribbed shell, which is typical of the genus Vexillum. The shell’s coloration varies but usually has earthy or muted tones, providing camouflage in its natural environment. The species is relatively small, with an average length of approximately 16–42 millimeters, though larger specimens may occasionally be found. Its morphology includes distinct costae, or ribs, along the shell, which provides structural integrity and aids in identification among similar species within its genus.

== Distribution ==
This marine species occurs off the Philippines and in the East China Sea.
