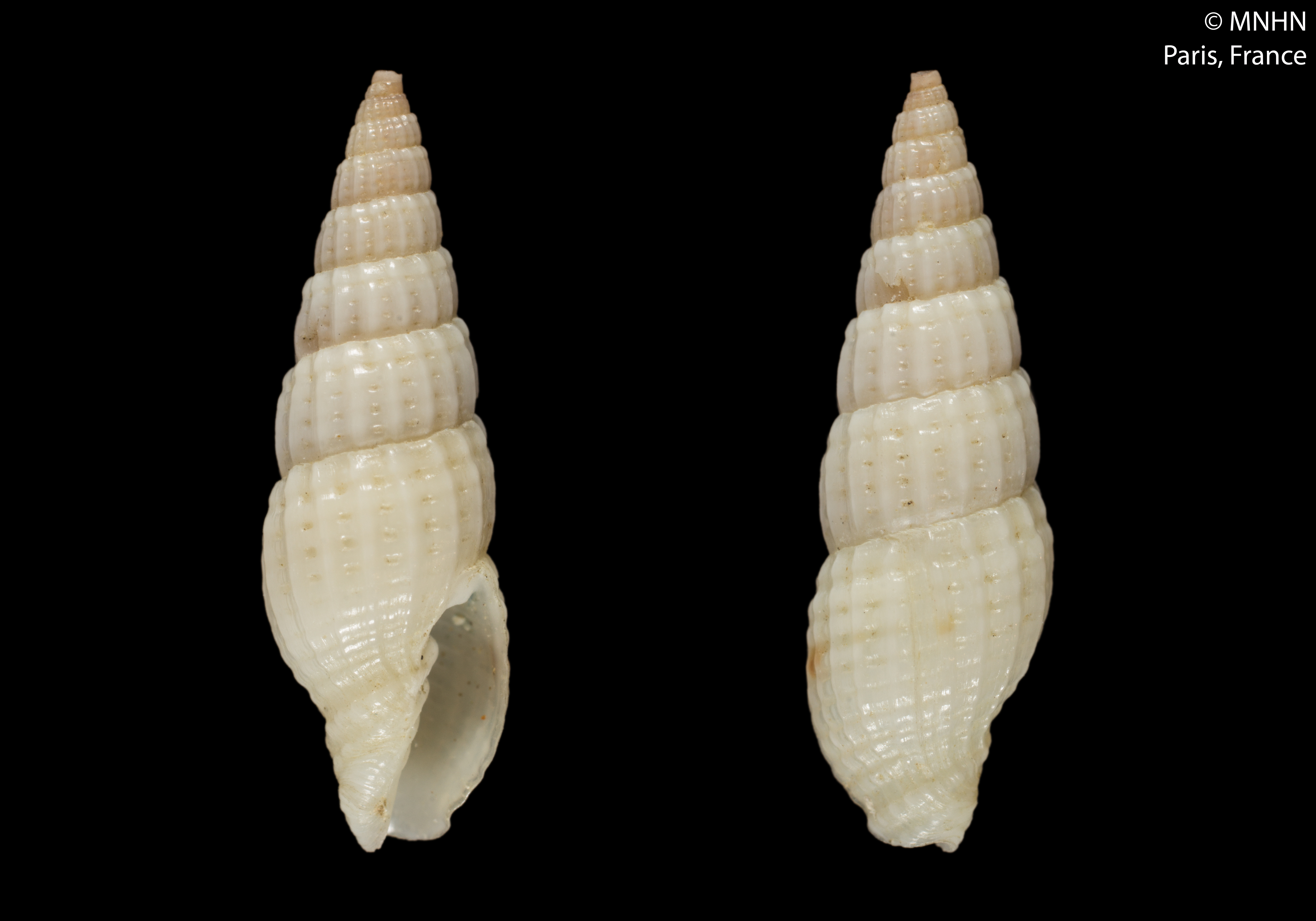
- Shell of Vexillum virginale (syntype at MNHN, Paris)

Scientific classification
- Kingdom: Animalia
- Phylum: Mollusca
- Class: Gastropoda
- Subclass: Caenogastropoda
- Order: Neogastropoda
- Superfamily: Turbinelloidea
- Family: Costellariidae
- Genus: Vexillum
- Species: V. virginale

Binomial name
- Vexillum virginale (Lesson, 1842)

Synonyms
- Mitra pallida A. Adams, 1853; Mitra virginalis Lesson, 1842 (original combination); Vexillum (Costellaria) virginale (Lesson, 1842); Vexillum virginalis (Lesson, 1842) (incorrect gender ending)

= Vexillum virginale =

Species of gastropod

Vexillum virginale is a species of small sea snail, marine gastropod mollusk in the family Costellariidae, the ribbed miters.

== Description ==
Vexillum virginale is a small marine animal with an elongated, slender shell, with a spiral sculpture, and a distinct patterned surface. It inhabits in shallow marine environments. The length of the shell attains 13.5 mm.

== Distribution ==
This marine species occurs off Tahiti.
