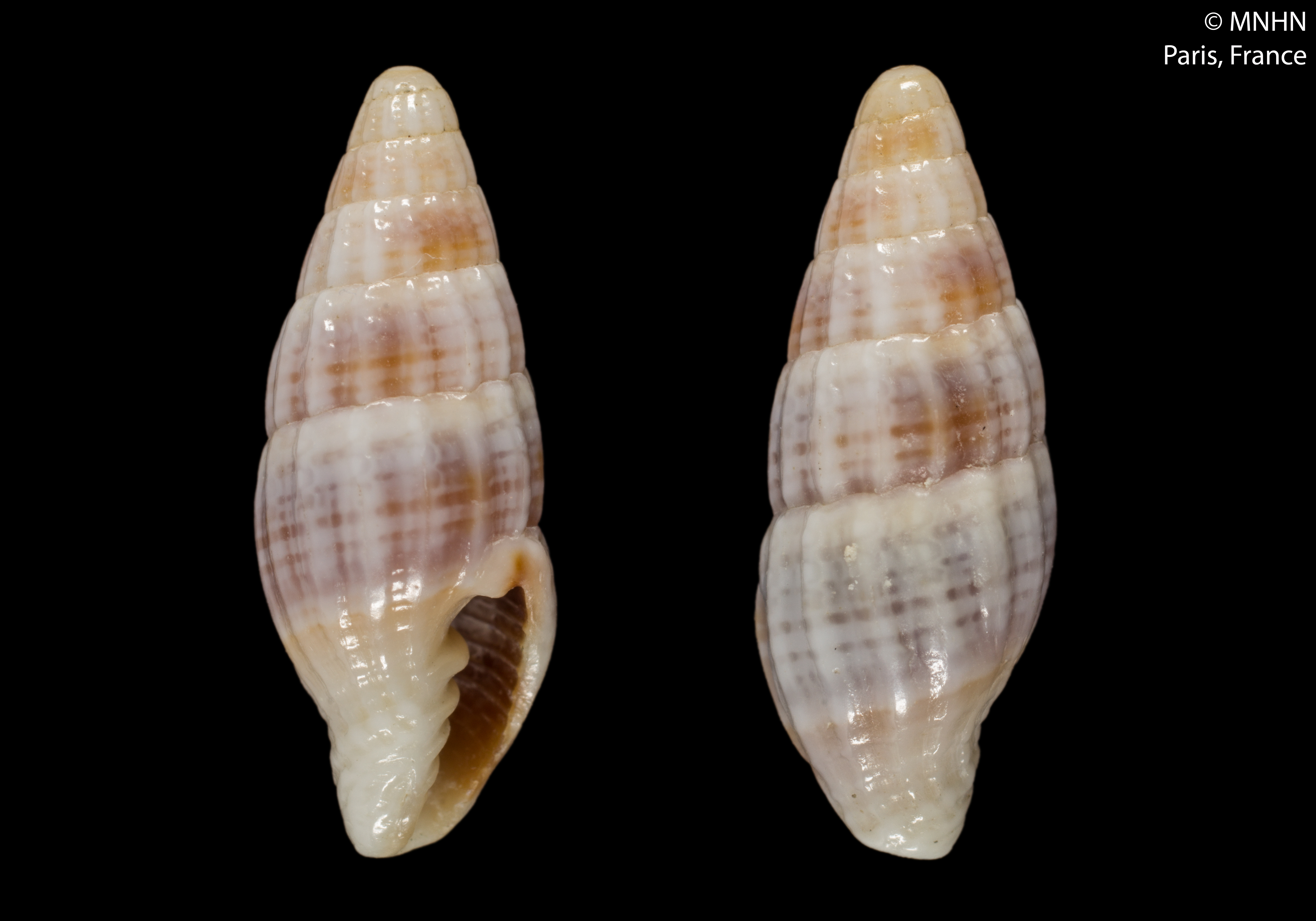
- Shell of Vexillum albotaeniatum (specimen at MNHN, Paris)

Scientific classification
- Kingdom: Animalia
- Phylum: Mollusca
- Class: Gastropoda
- Subclass: Caenogastropoda
- Order: Neogastropoda
- Family: Costellariidae
- Genus: Vexillum
- Species: V. albotaeniatum

Binomial name
- Vexillum albotaeniatum (Hervier, 1897)

Synonyms
- Mitra albotaeniata Hervier, 1897; Vexillum (Costellaria) albotaeniatum (Hervier, 1897)

= Vexillum albotaeniatum =

Species of gastropod

Vexillum albotaeniatum is a species of small sea snail, marine gastropod mollusk in the family Costellariidae, the ribbed miters.

== Description ==
The shell is elongated with longitudinal ridges, and is white with some darker spots. The last whirl exceeds half of the total length of the shell, with a pointed lip. The shell's throat is also striated. The length of the shell reaches 14-15 millimeters, and its diameter reaches a max of 5 millimeters.

== Distribution ==
This marine species occurs off New Caledonia and the Philippines.
