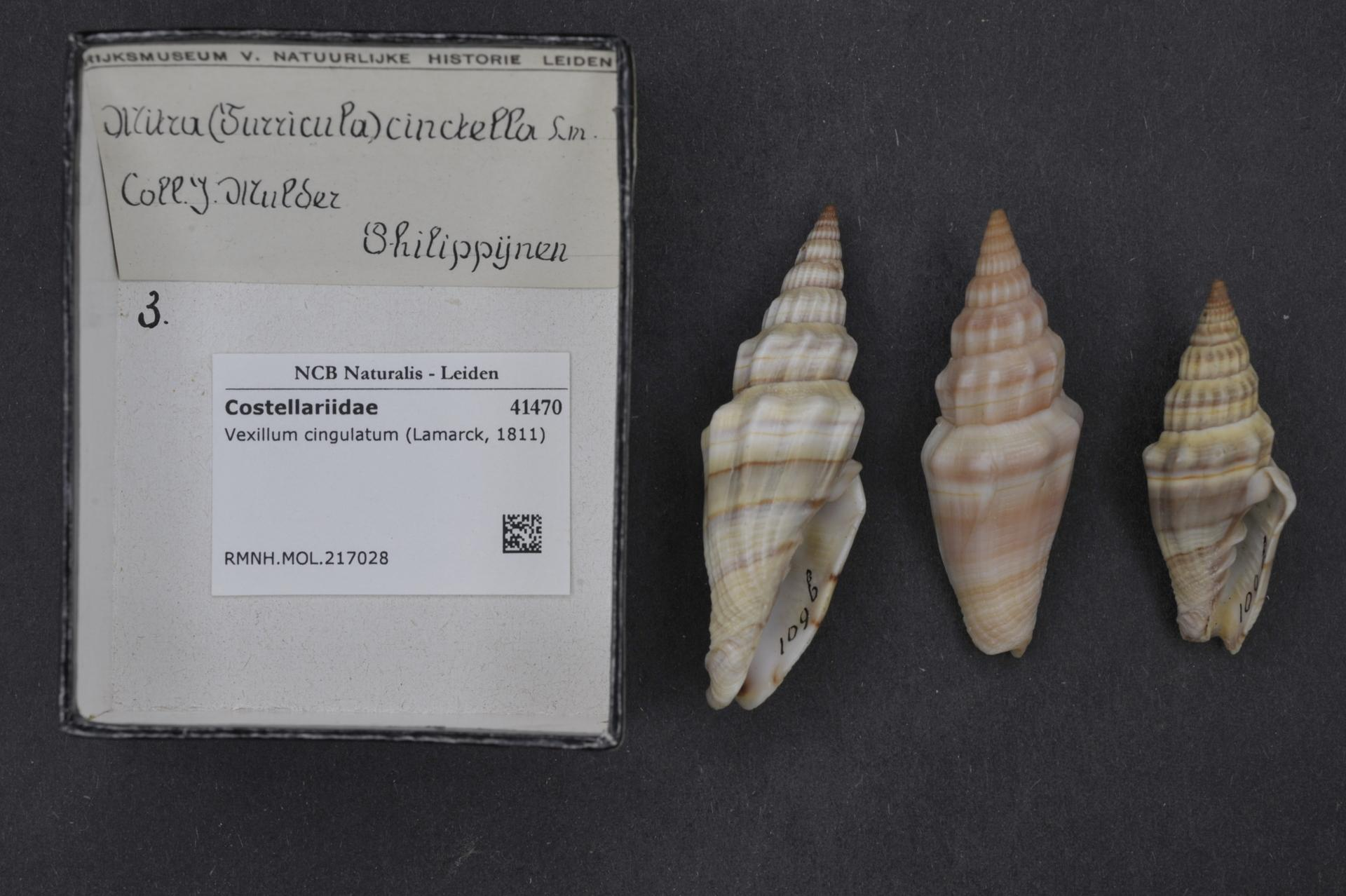
- Vexillum cingulatum (specimen at Naturalis Biodiversity Center)

Scientific classification
- Kingdom: Animalia
- Phylum: Mollusca
- Class: Gastropoda
- Subclass: Caenogastropoda
- Order: Neogastropoda
- Superfamily: Turbinelloidea
- Family: Costellariidae
- Genus: Vexillum
- Species: V. cingulatum

Binomial name
- Vexillum cingulatum (Lamarck, 1811)

Synonyms
- Mitra balteata Saint-Vincent, 1827; Mitra cinctella Lamarck, 1822; Mitra cingulata Lamarck, 1811 (original combination); Vexillum (Vexillum) cingulatum (Lamarck, 1811)

= Vexillum cingulatum =

Species of gastropod

Vexillum cingulatum is a species of small sea snail, marine gastropod mollusk in the family Costellariidae, the ribbed miters.

== Description ==
The length of the shell attains 53 mm.

== Distribution ==
This marine species occurs off Mozambique, the Philippines, Sri Lanka, and Indonesia.
