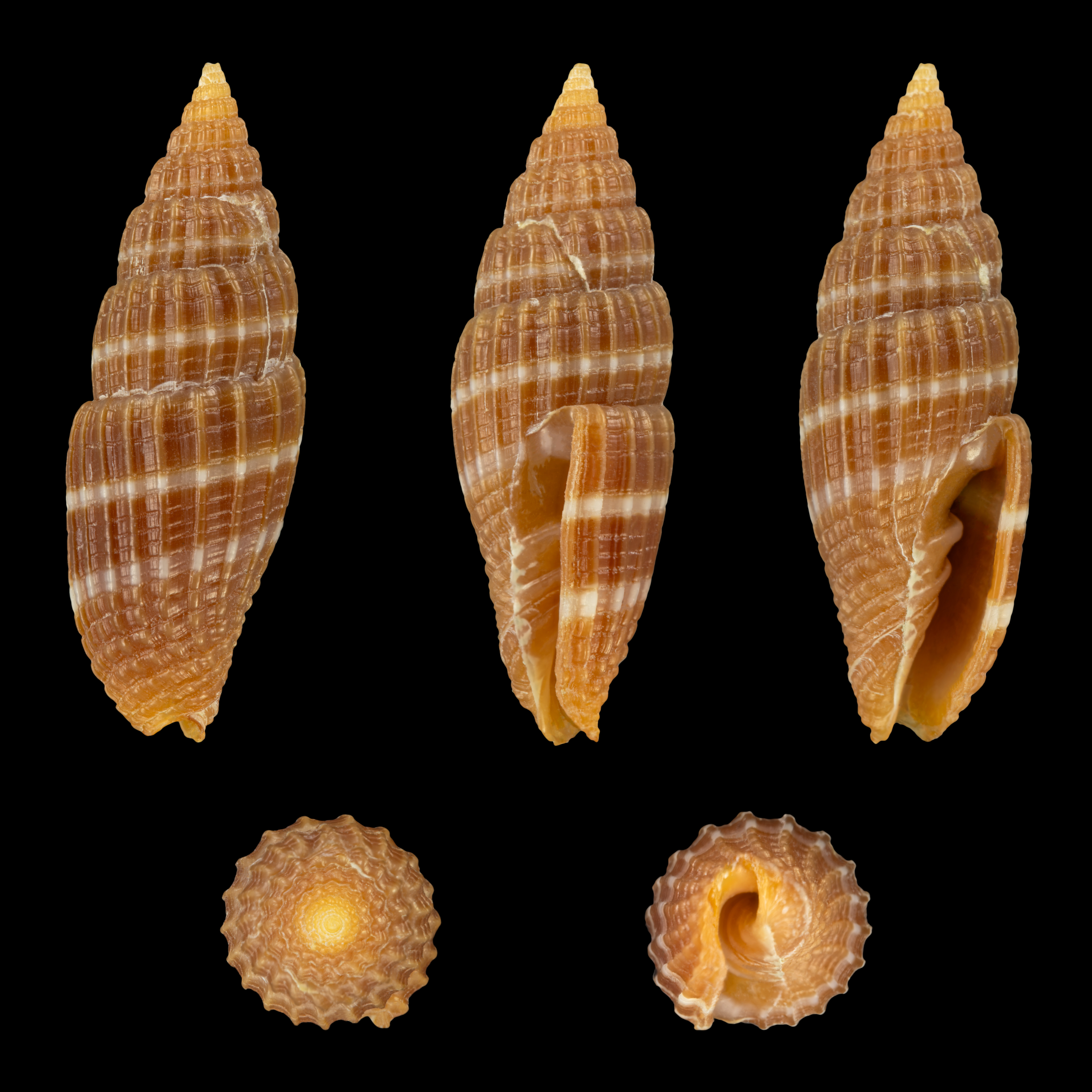

Scientific classification
- Kingdom: Animalia
- Phylum: Mollusca
- Class: Gastropoda
- Subclass: Caenogastropoda
- Order: Neogastropoda
- Superfamily: Turbinelloidea
- Family: Costellariidae
- Genus: Vexillum
- Species: V. ligatum

Binomial name
- Vexillum ligatum (A. Adams, 1853)

Synonyms
- Mitra ligata A. Adams, 1853 (original combination); Vexillum (Costellaria) ligatum (A. Adams, 1853)

= Vexillum ligatum =

Species of gastropod

Vexillum ligatum is a species of small sea snail, marine gastropod mollusk in the family Costellariidae, the ribbed miters.

== Description ==
The length of the shell varies between 13 mm and 25 mm.

The shell has an ovate-fusiform shape. The spire is longer than the aperture. The whorls are slightly convex. The shell is chestnut brown, outlined with a white strip through the middle of the whorls. The shell is covered with many longitudinal ribs, crossed by sublirate riblets. The columella is four-plaited. The simple outer lip has a sharp margin.

== Distribution ==
This marine species occurs off the Philippines and the Solomon Islands.
