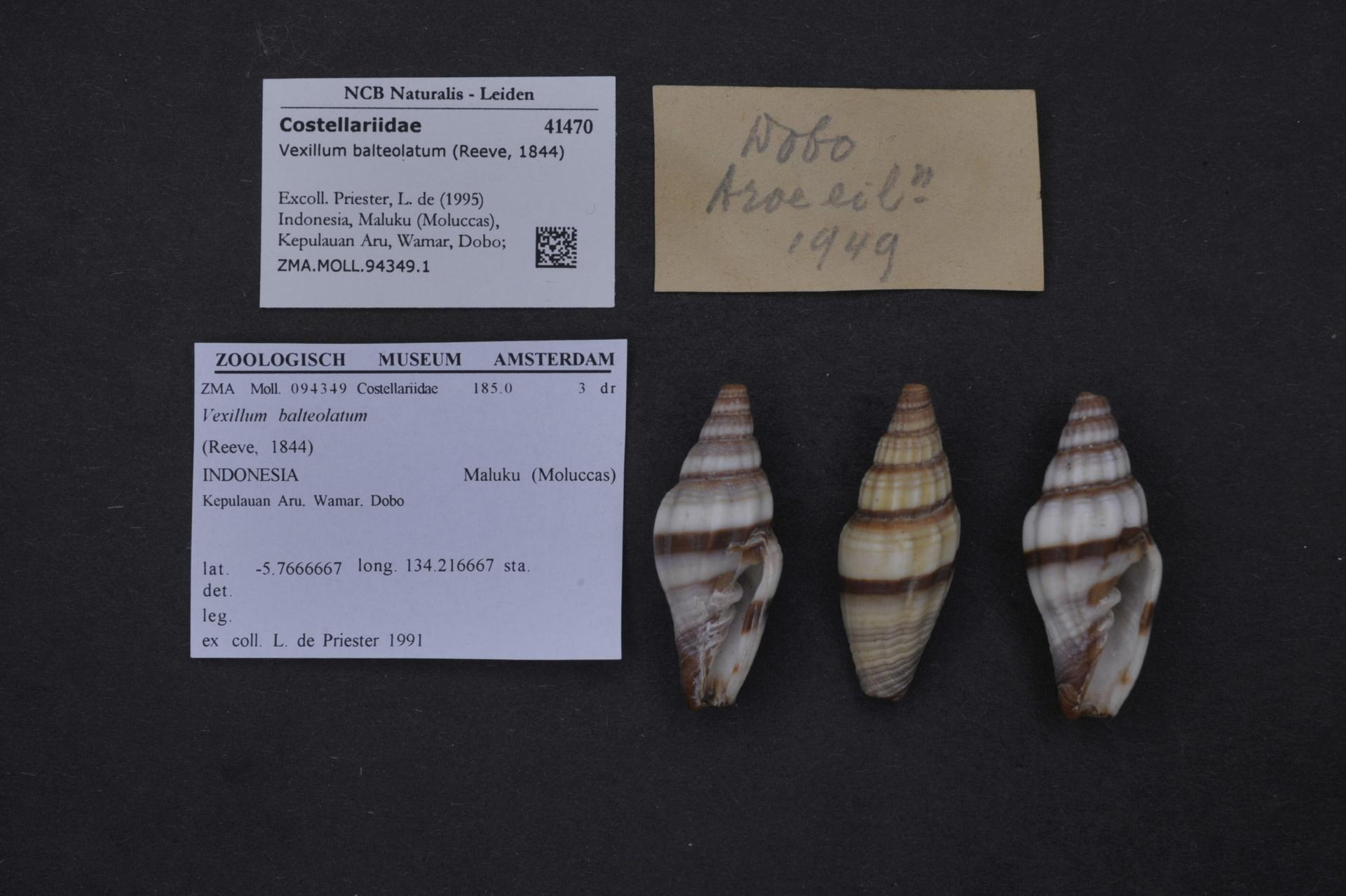
- Vexillum balteolatum (specimen at Naturalis Biodiversity Center)

Scientific classification
- Kingdom: Animalia
- Phylum: Mollusca
- Class: Gastropoda
- Subclass: Caenogastropoda
- Order: Neogastropoda
- Superfamily: Turbinelloidea
- Family: Costellariidae
- Genus: Vexillum
- Species: V. balteolatum

Binomial name
- Vexillum balteolatum (Reeve, 1844)

Synonyms
- Mitra balteolata Reeve, 1844; Mitra berthae G. B. Sowerby III, 1879 junior subjective synonym; Vexillum (Vexillum) balteolatum (Reeve, 1844)

= Vexillum balteolatum =

Species of gastropod

Vexillum balteolatum is a species of sea snail, a marine gastropod mollusk, in the family Costellariidae, the ribbed miters.

== Description ==
The length of the shell varies between 29 mm and 45 mm.

== Distribution ==
This marine species occurs off the Philippines and in the South China Sea.
