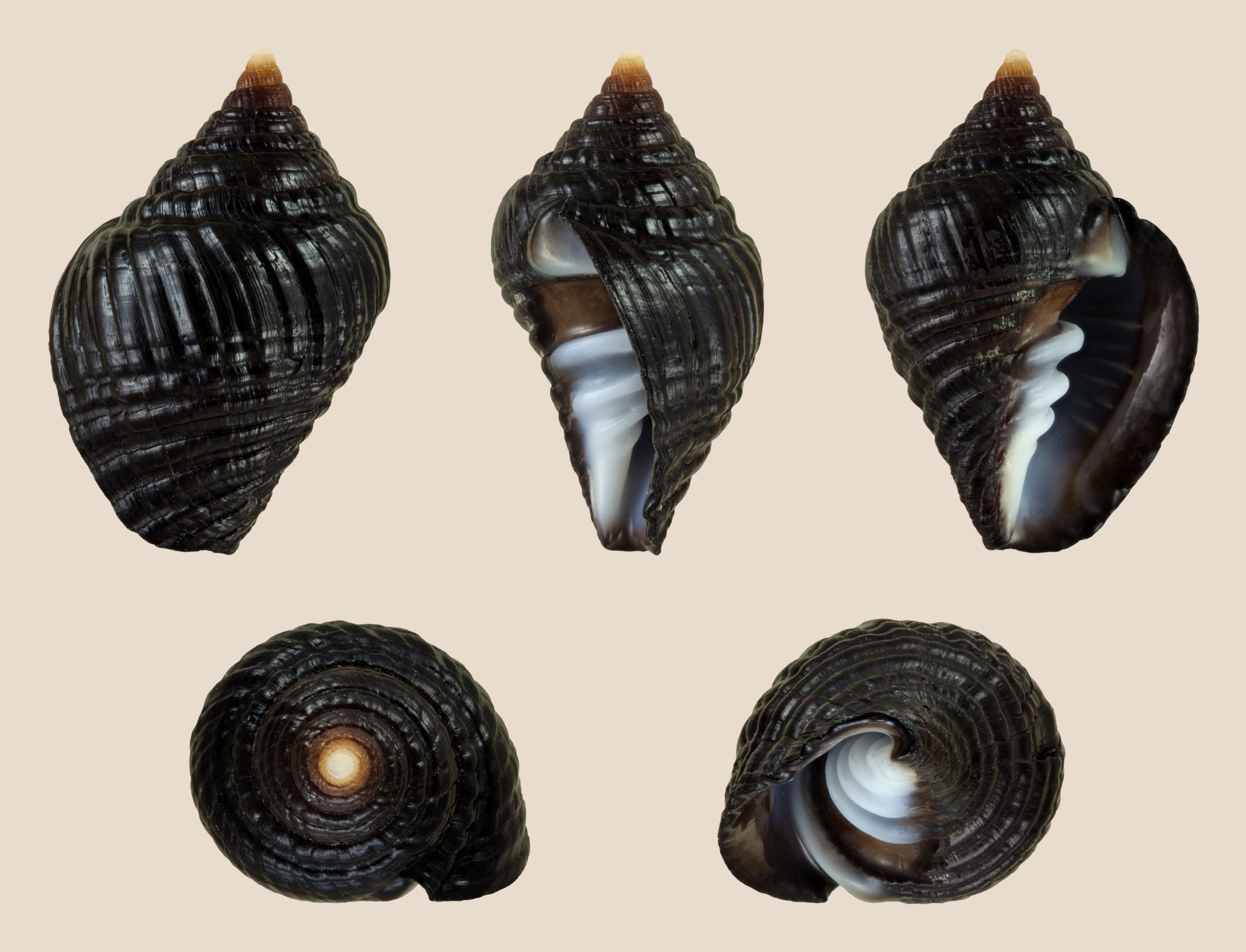

Scientific classification
- Kingdom: Animalia
- Phylum: Mollusca
- Class: Gastropoda
- Subclass: Caenogastropoda
- Order: Neogastropoda
- Superfamily: Turbinelloidea
- Family: Costellariidae
- Genus: Vexillum
- Species: V. ziervogelii

Binomial name
- Vexillum ziervogelii (Gmelin, 1791)

Synonyms
- Cancellaria ziervogeliana Lamarck, 1822; Voluta ziervogelii Gmelin, 1791; Zierliana strombiforme (J.F. Gmelin, 1791); Zierliana ziervogelii (Gmelin, 1791)

= Vexillum ziervogelii =

Species of gastropod

Vexillum ziervogelii is a species of sea snail, a marine gastropod mollusk, in the family Costellariidae, the ribbed miters.

== Description ==
The length of the shell attains 27 mm.

The color of the shell is dark chocolate-brown, the aperture and the columella are white or slightly tinged with light chocolate.

== Distribution ==
This marine species occurs off the Philippines.
