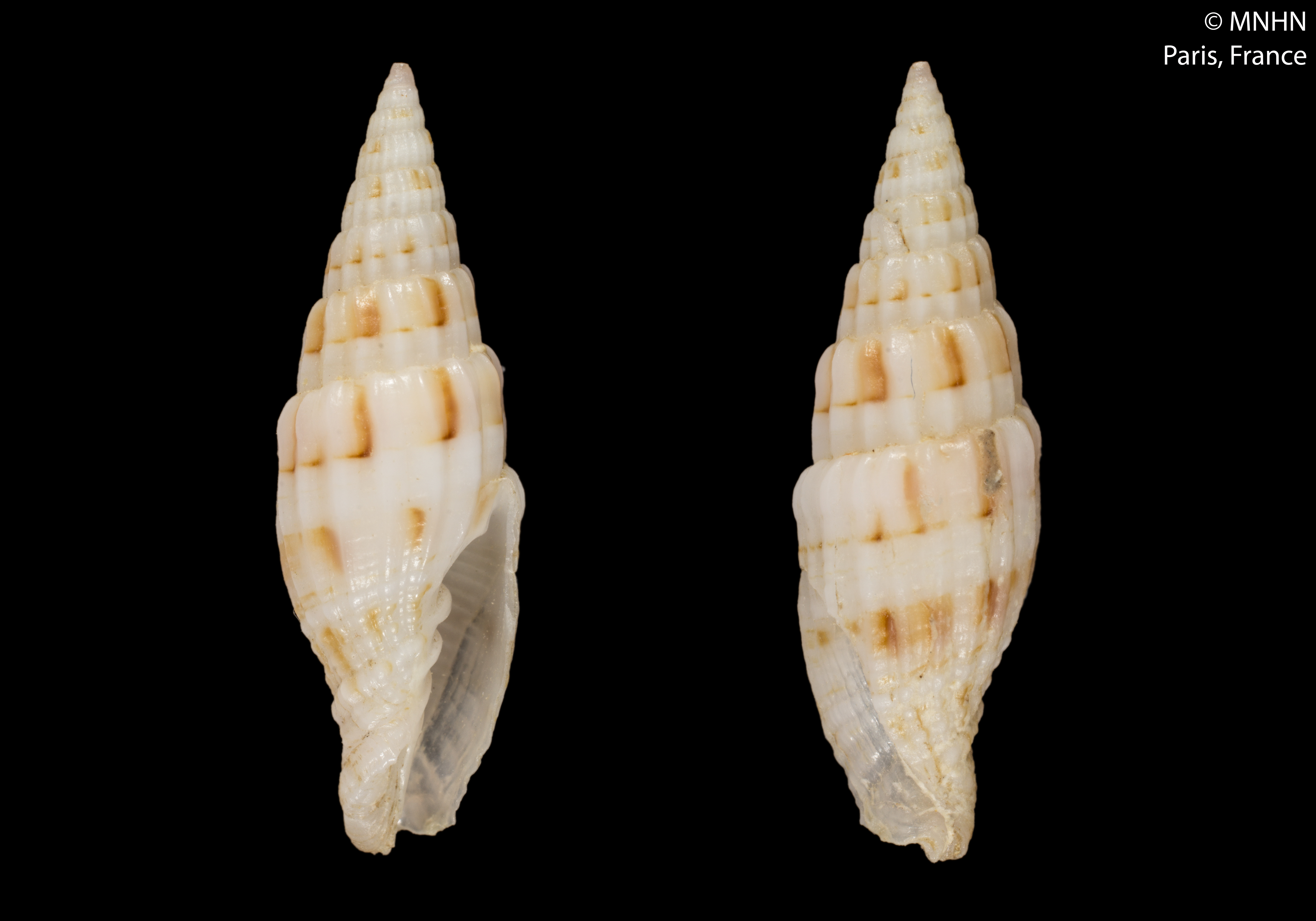
- Shell of Vexillum tanguyae (holotype at MNHN, Paris)

Scientific classification
- Kingdom: Animalia
- Phylum: Mollusca
- Class: Gastropoda
- Subclass: Caenogastropoda
- Order: Neogastropoda
- Superfamily: Turbinelloidea
- Family: Costellariidae
- Genus: Vexillum
- Species: V. tanguyae

Binomial name
- Vexillum tanguyae Guillot de Suduiraut & Boutet, 2007

Synonyms
- Vexillum (Costellaria) tanguyae E. Guillot de Suduiraut & Boutet, 2007 ·

= Vexillum tanguyae =

Species of gastropod

Vexillum tanguyae is a species of small sea snail, marine gastropod mollusk in the family Costellariidae, the ribbed miters.

== Description ==
The length of the shell attains 23.8 mm. Deep water species that occur between 50 and 75 m deep.

== Distribution ==
This marine species occurs off the Tuamotus and Society Islands.
