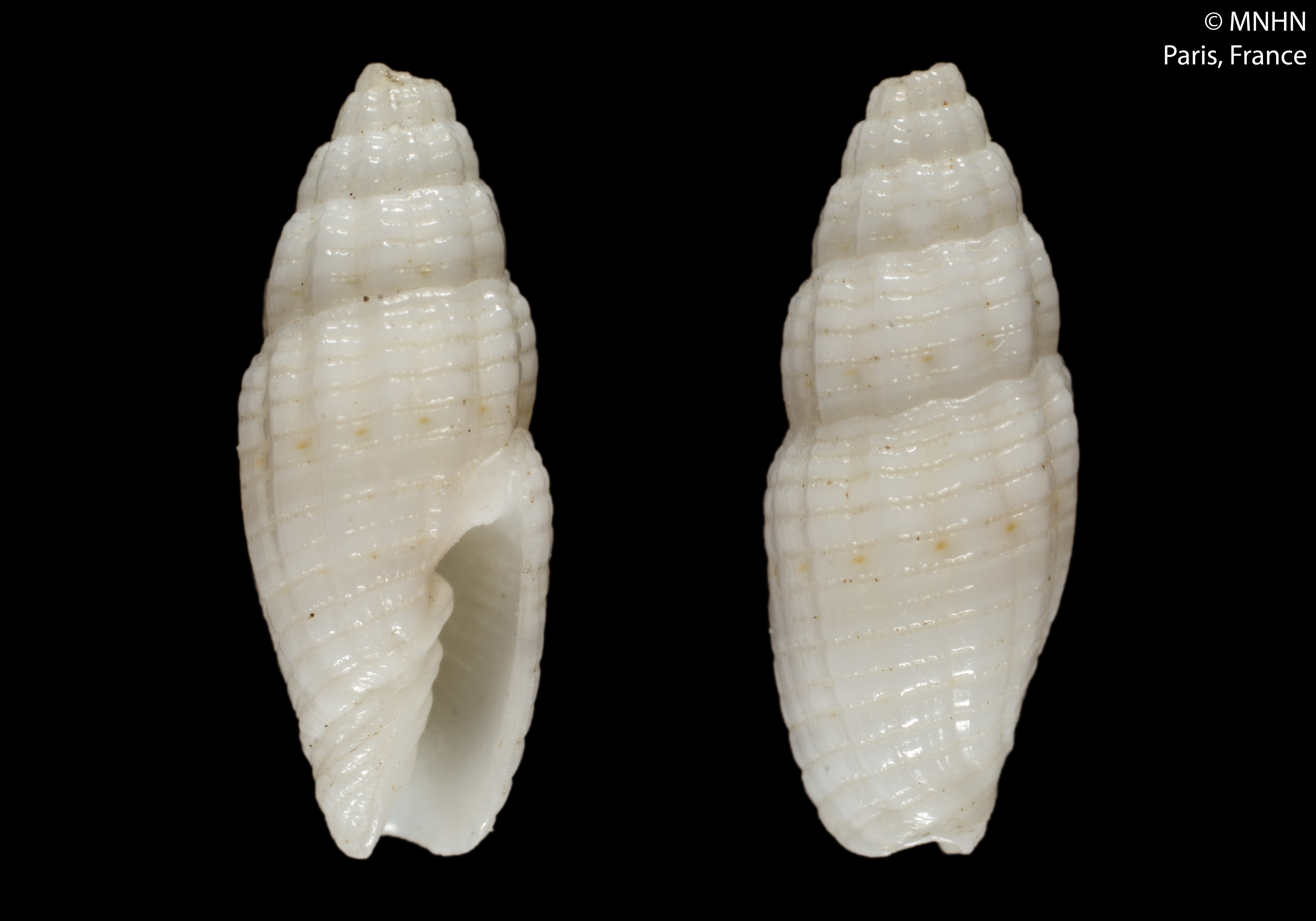
- Shell of Vexillum humile (lectotype at MNHN, Paris)

Scientific classification
- Kingdom: Animalia
- Phylum: Mollusca
- Class: Gastropoda
- Subclass: Caenogastropoda
- Order: Neogastropoda
- Superfamily: Turbinelloidea
- Family: Costellariidae
- Genus: Vexillum
- Species: V. humile

Binomial name
- Vexillum humile (Hervier, 1897)

Synonyms
- Mitra humilis Hervier, 1897 (original combination); Vexillum (Costellaria) humile (Hervier, 1897)

= Vexillum humile =

Species of gastropod

Vexillum humile is a species of small sea snail, marine gastropod mollusk in the family Costellariidae, the ribbed miters.

== Description ==
The length of the shell varies between 7.5 mm and 9.8 mm.

== Distribution ==
This marine species occurs off Madagascar, Mozambique, the Seychelles, the Maldives, the Philippines, and Guam.
