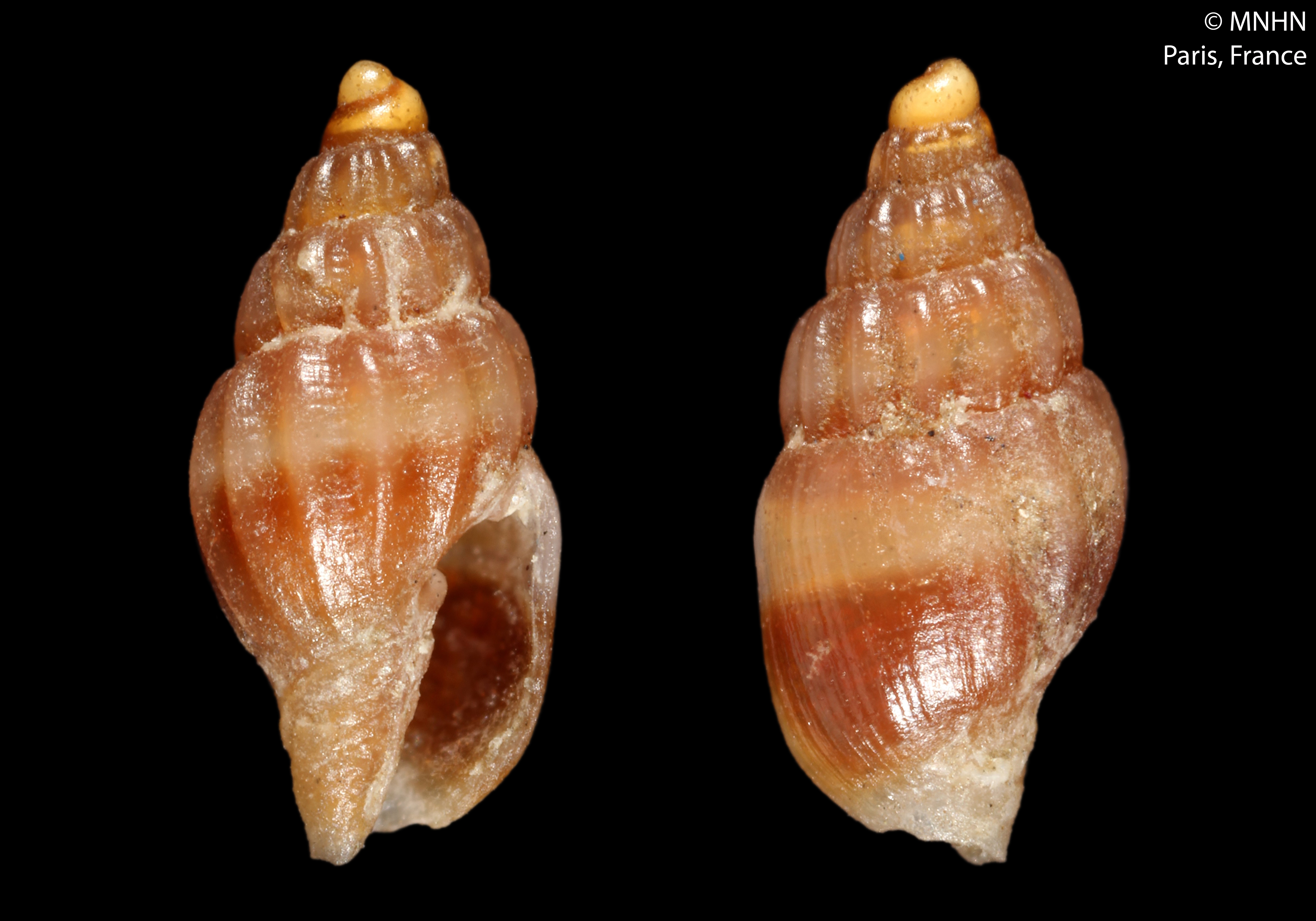
- Shell of Vexillum daniellae (holotype at MNHN, Paris)

Scientific classification
- Kingdom: Animalia
- Phylum: Mollusca
- Class: Gastropoda
- Subclass: Caenogastropoda
- Order: Neogastropoda
- Superfamily: Turbinelloidea
- Family: Costellariidae
- Genus: Vexillum
- Species: V. daniellae

Binomial name
- Vexillum daniellae Drivas & Jay, 1989

= Vexillum daniellae =

Species of gastropod

Vexillum daniellae is a species of sea snail, a marine gastropod mollusk, in the family Costellariidae, the ribbed miters.

== Description ==
The length of the shell attains 7 mm and its height reaches about 4mm. Its shell is thin, globose and smooth, with a teloconch consisting of three whorls. Its aperture is semilunar in shape with4 columellar teeth.

== Distribution ==
This marine species is found in the waters of Réunion Island.
