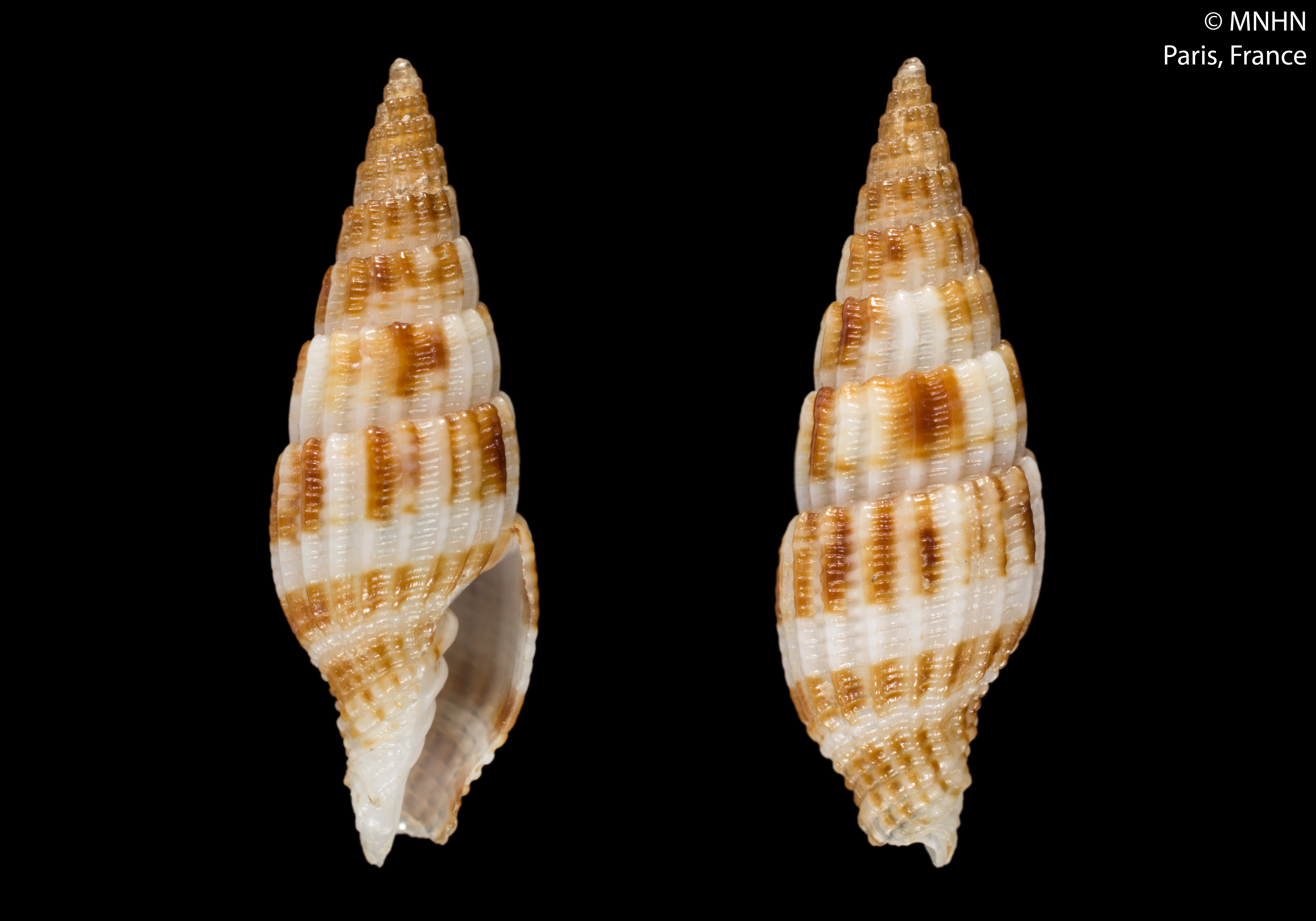
- Shell of Vexillum hoaraui (holotype at MNHN, Paris)

Scientific classification
- Kingdom: Animalia
- Phylum: Mollusca
- Class: Gastropoda
- Subclass: Caenogastropoda
- Order: Neogastropoda
- Superfamily: Turbinelloidea
- Family: Costellariidae
- Genus: Vexillum
- Species: V. hoaraui

Binomial name
- Vexillum hoaraui Guillot de Suduiraut, 2007

Synonyms
- Vexillum (Costellaria) hoaraui E. Guillot de Suduiraut, 2007

= Vexillum hoaraui =

Species of gastropod

Vexillum hoaraui is a species of small sea snail, marine gastropod mollusk in the family Costellariidae, the ribbed miters.

== Description ==
The length of the shell attains 14.4 mm.

== Distribution ==
This species occurs in the Indian Ocean off Réunion.
