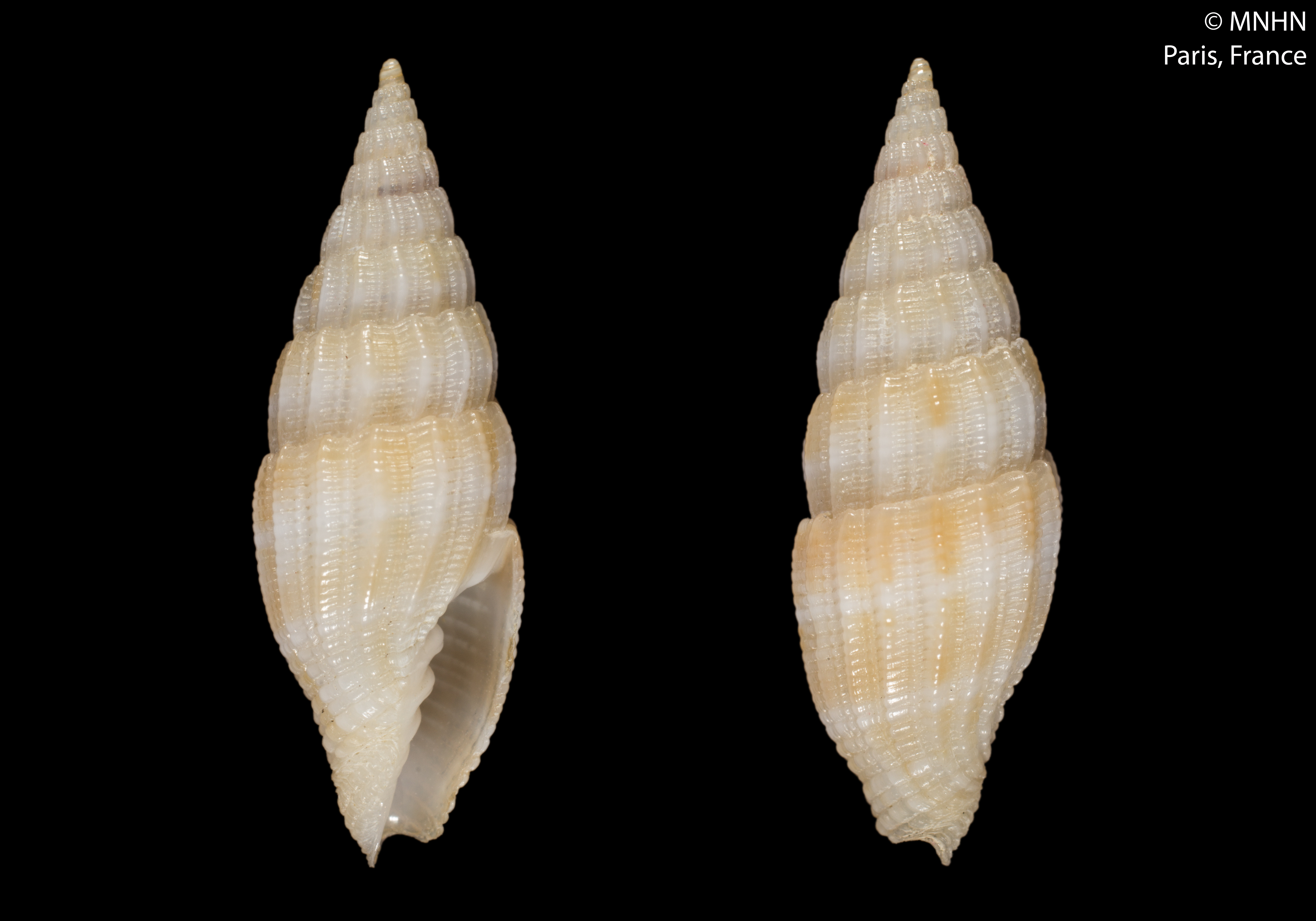
- Shell of Vexillum darwini (holotype at MNHN, Paris)

Scientific classification
- Kingdom: Animalia
- Phylum: Mollusca
- Class: Gastropoda
- Subclass: Caenogastropoda
- Order: Neogastropoda
- Superfamily: Turbinelloidea
- Family: Costellariidae
- Genus: Vexillum
- Species: V. darwini

Binomial name
- Vexillum darwini Salisbury & Guillot de Suduiraut, 2006

Synonyms
- Vexillum (Costellaria) darwini R. Salisbury & E. Guillot de Suduiraut, 2006

= Vexillum darwini =

Species of gastropod

Vexillum darwini is a species of small sea snail, marine gastropod mollusk in the family Costellariidae, the ribbed miters.

== Description ==
The length of the shell attains 17 mm.

== Distribution ==
This marine species occurs off the Philippines.
