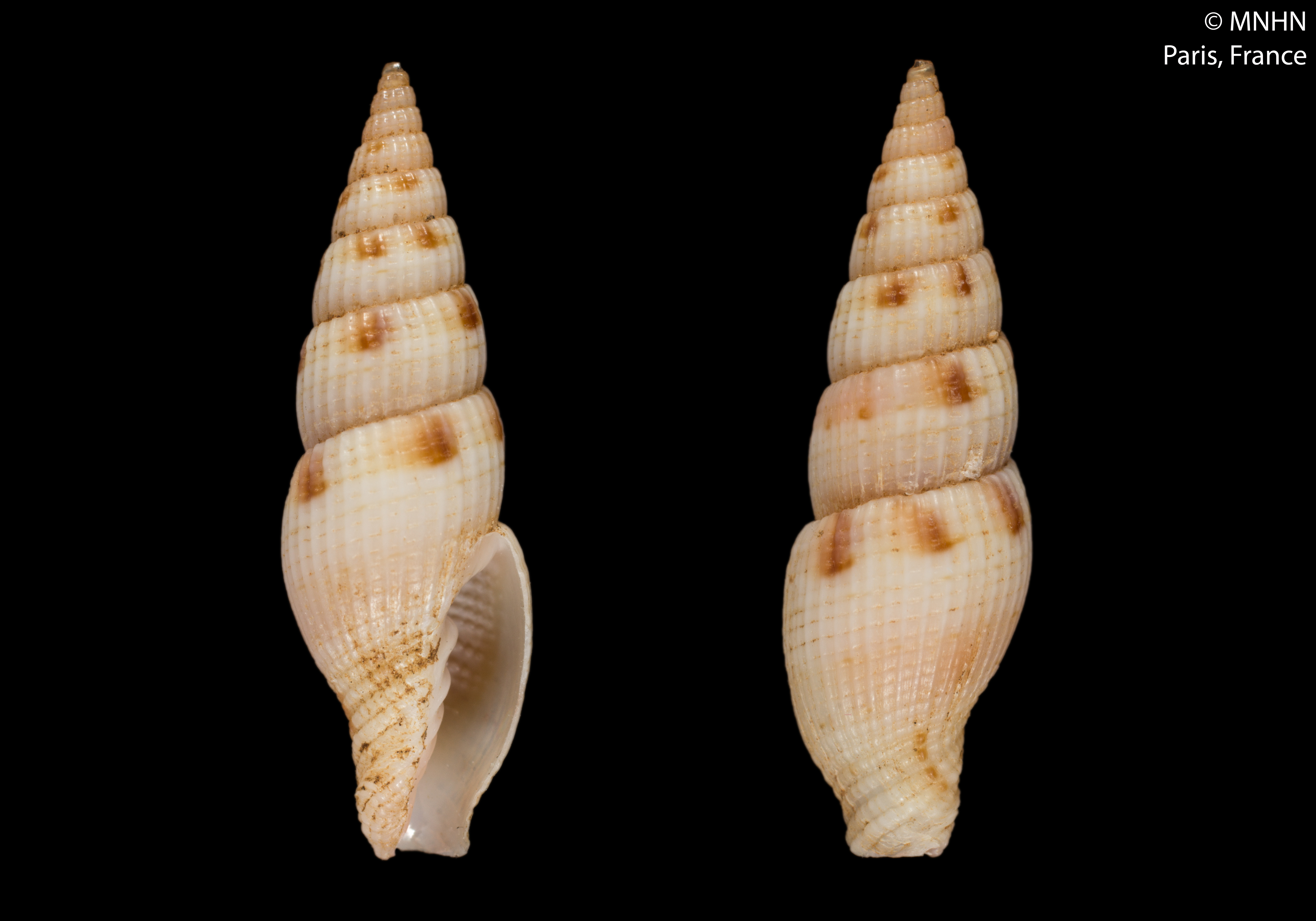
- Shell of Vexillum germaineae (holotype at MNHN, Paris)

Scientific classification
- Kingdom: Animalia
- Phylum: Mollusca
- Class: Gastropoda
- Subclass: Caenogastropoda
- Order: Neogastropoda
- Superfamily: Turbinelloidea
- Family: Costellariidae
- Genus: Vexillum
- Species: V. germaineae

Binomial name
- Vexillum germaineae Herrmann & Salisbury, 2014

Synonyms
- Vexillum (Costellaria) germaineae Herrmann & Salisbury, 2014

= Vexillum germaineae =

Species of gastropod

Vexillum germaineae is a species of sea snail, a marine gastropod mollusk, in the family Costellariidae, the ribbed miters.

== Description ==
The length of the shell attains 15 mm.

== Distribution ==
This marine species occurs off the Marquesas Islands.
