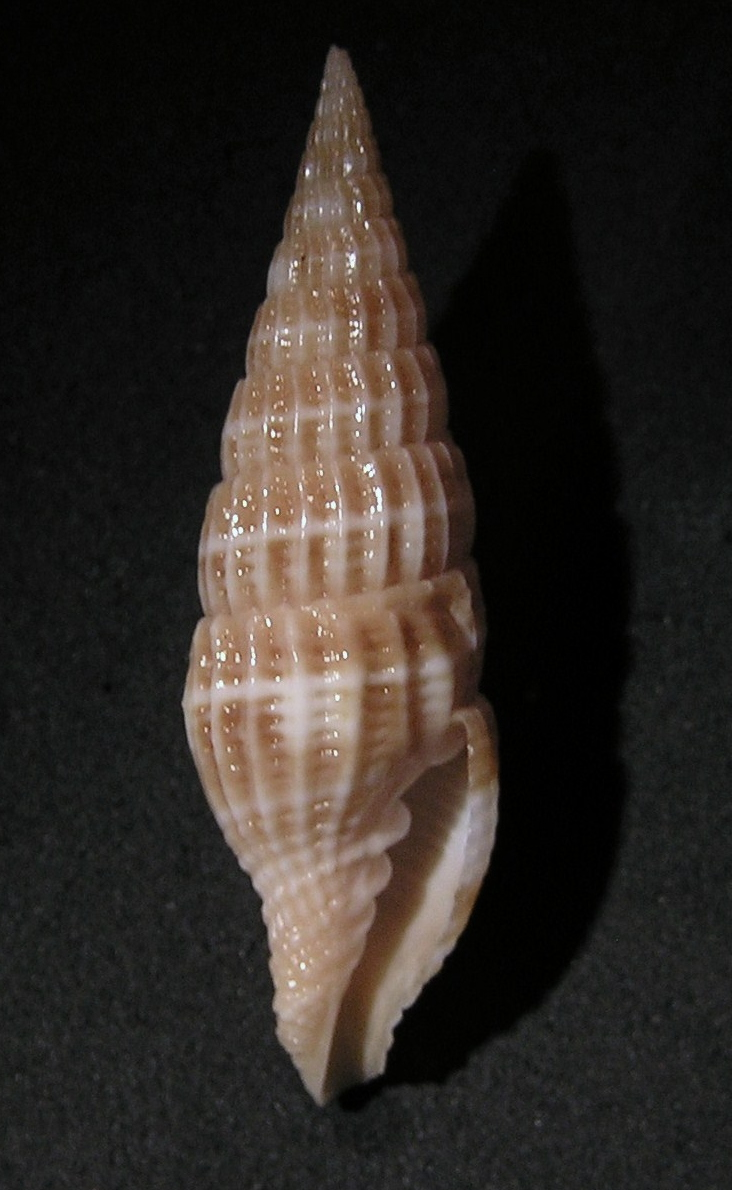
- Shell of Vexillum sculptile

Scientific classification
- Kingdom: Animalia
- Phylum: Mollusca
- Class: Gastropoda
- Subclass: Caenogastropoda
- Order: Neogastropoda
- Superfamily: Turbinelloidea
- Family: Costellariidae
- Genus: Vexillum
- Species: V. sculptile

Binomial name
- Vexillum sculptile (Reeve, 1845)

Synonyms
- Costellaria interviewi (L.A. Reeve, 1845); Costellaria sculptilis var. interviewi Ray, 1954; Mitra (Pusia) iteina Melvill, 1918; Mitra cophina Gould, 1850; Mitra sculptilis Reeve, 1845 (original combination); Pusia iteina (L.A. Reeve, 1845); Vexillum (Costellaria) sculptile (Reeve, 1845); Vexillum cophinum (Gould, 1850); Vexillum sculptile (L.A. Reeve, 1845)

= Vexillum sculptile =

Species of gastropod

Vexillum sculptile, common name the carved mitre, is a species of small sea snail, marine gastropod mollusk in the family Costellariidae, the ribbed miters.

== Description ==
The length of the shell attains 17 mm.

The elongated shell is somewhat cylindrical and a little recurved at the base. The sutures of the spire are rather impressed. The shell is longitudinally closely ridged with beautiful shining riblets. The interstices transversely strongly latticed. The decussating cancellations are so regularly disposed, with the white stramineous and fuscous zoned spiral bands that they can serve to characterize the species. The shell is whitish, faintly spotted with pale brown. The lower portion of the body whorl is pale brown, whitish at the base. The columella is five-plaited.

== Distribution ==
This species occurs in the Persian Gulf; also off the Philippines, Indonesia and the Maldives; in the East China Sea; off the Fiji Islands, New Caledonia and Australia (Queensland).
