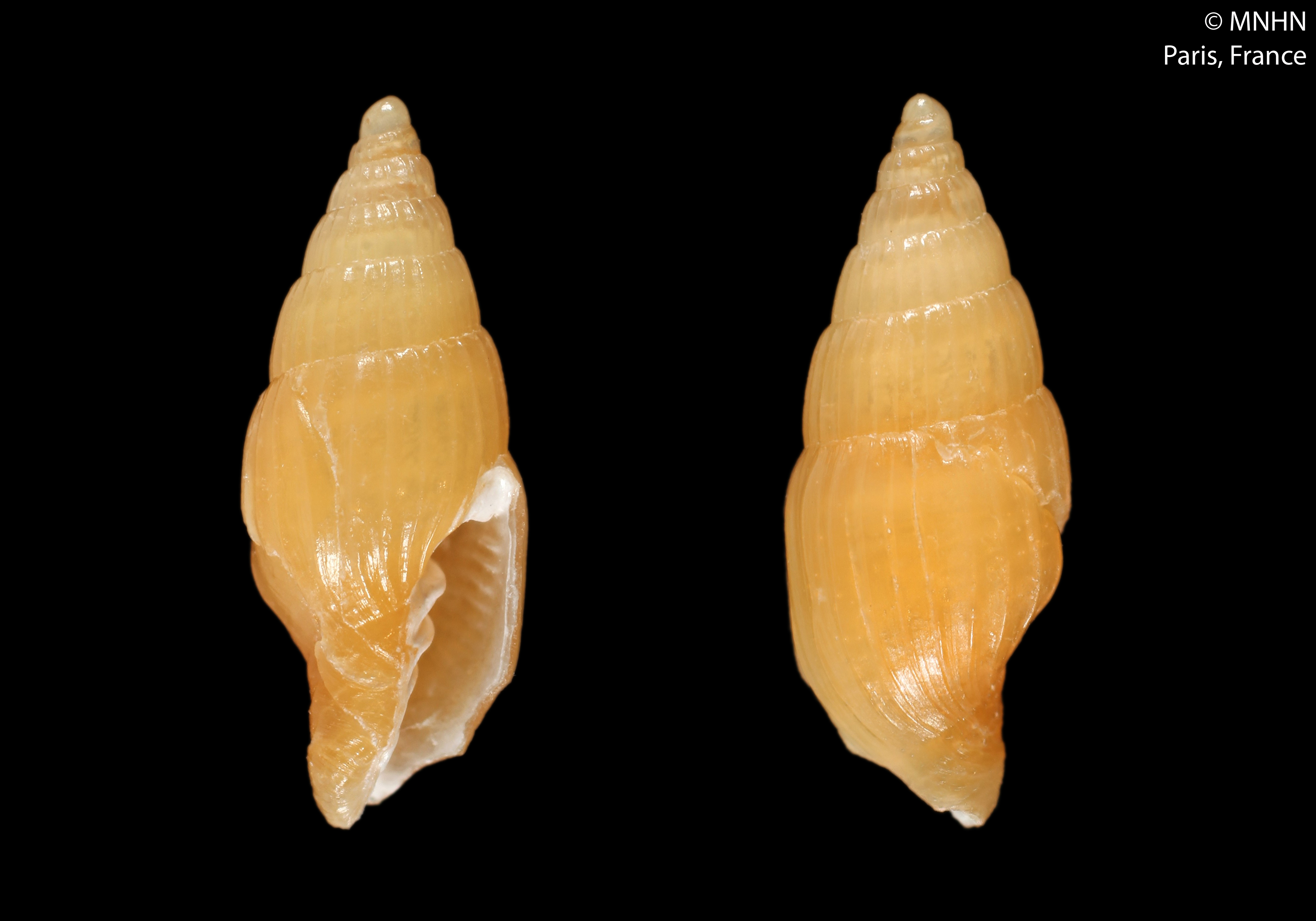
- Shell of Vexillum unicolor (holotype at MNHN, Paris)

Scientific classification
- Kingdom: Animalia
- Phylum: Mollusca
- Class: Gastropoda
- Subclass: Caenogastropoda
- Order: Neogastropoda
- Superfamily: Turbinelloidea
- Family: Costellariidae
- Genus: Vexillum
- Species: V. unicolor

Binomial name
- Vexillum unicolor Herrmann, 2012

Synonyms
- Vexillum (Pusia) unicolor Herrmann, 2012

= Vexillum unicolor =

Species of gastropod

Vexillum unicolor is a species of sea snail, a marine gastropod mollusk, in the family Costellariidae, the ribbed miters.

== Description ==
The length of the shell attains 5.4 mm.

== Distribution ==
This marine species occurs off the Tuamotu Archipelago, French Polynesia.
