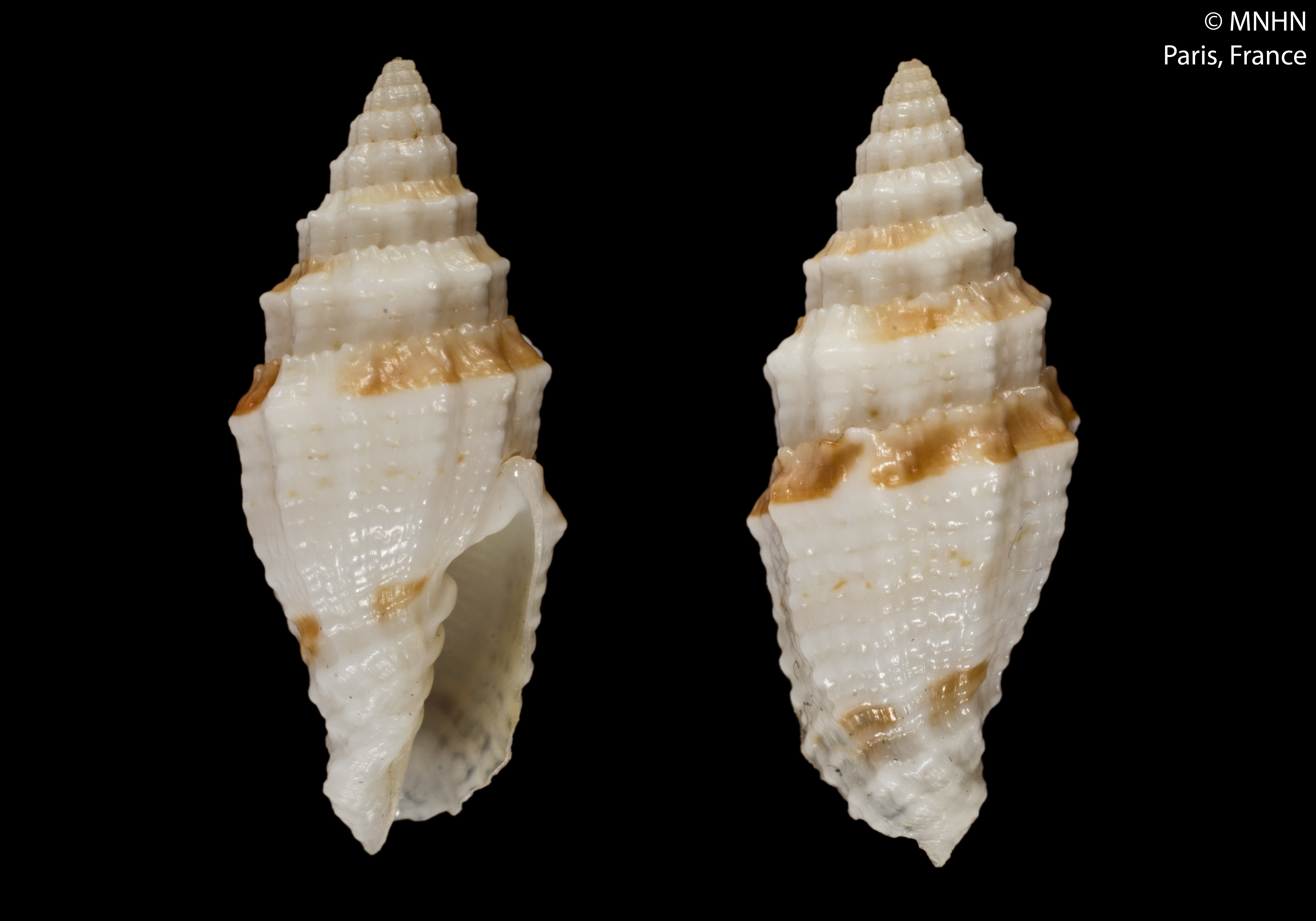
- Shell of Vexillum bouteti (holotype at MNHN, Paris)

Scientific classification
- Kingdom: Animalia
- Phylum: Mollusca
- Class: Gastropoda
- Subclass: Caenogastropoda
- Order: Neogastropoda
- Superfamily: Turbinelloidea
- Family: Costellariidae
- Genus: Vexillum
- Species: V. bouteti

Binomial name
- Vexillum bouteti Salisbury & Herrmann, 2012

Synonyms
- Vexillum (Costellaria) bouteti Salisbury & Herrmann, 2012

= Vexillum bouteti =

Species of gastropod

Vexillum bouteti is a small species of sea snail, a marine gastropod mollusk, in the family Costellariidae, the ribbed miters.

== Description ==
The length of the shell attains 16 mm.

== Distribution ==
This marine species occurs in French Polynesia.
