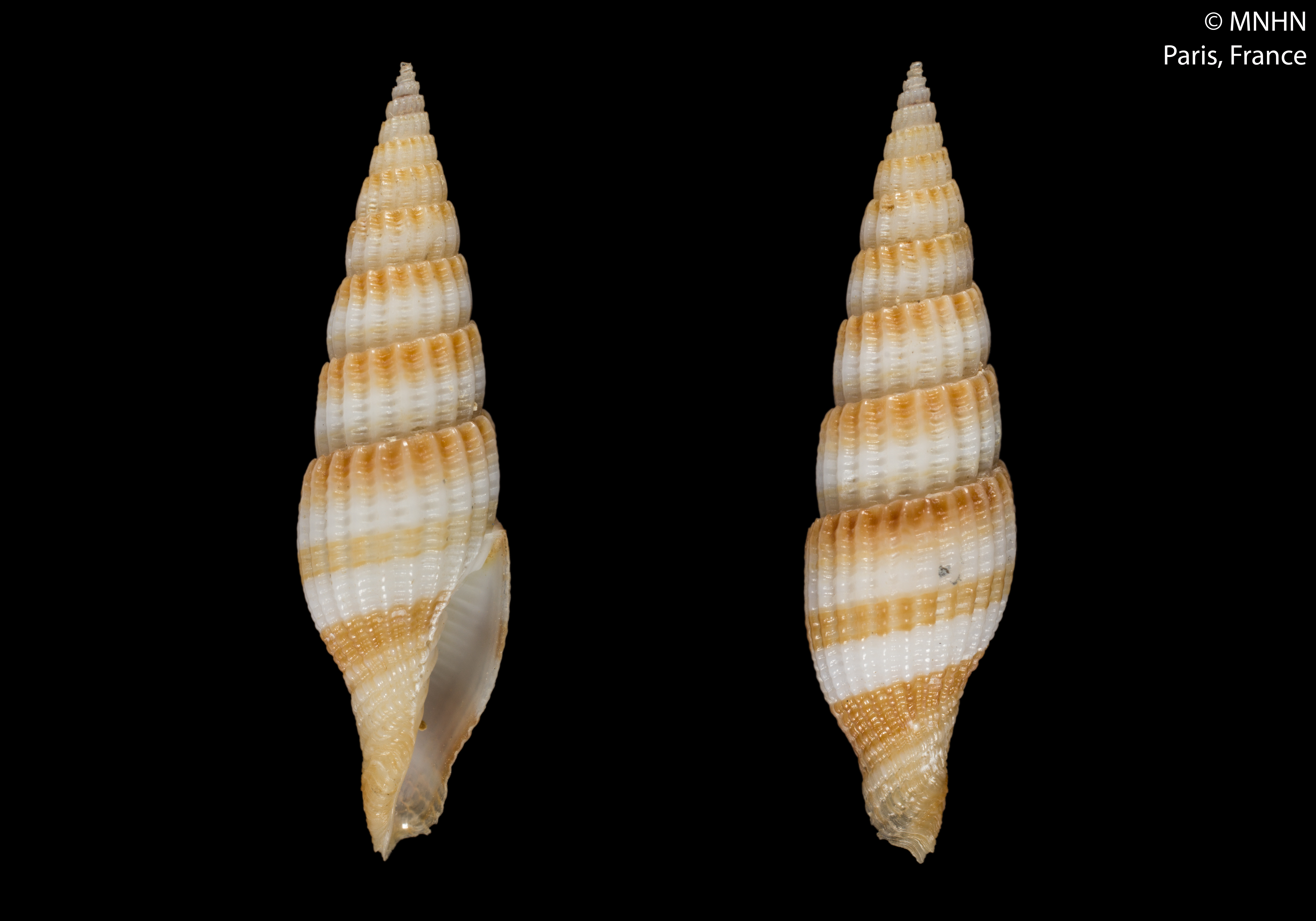
- Shel of Vexillum alvinobalani (holotype at MNHN, Paris)

Scientific classification
- Kingdom: Animalia
- Phylum: Mollusca
- Class: Gastropoda
- Subclass: Caenogastropoda
- Order: Neogastropoda
- Family: Costellariidae
- Genus: Vexillum
- Species: V. alvinobalani

Binomial name
- Vexillum alvinobalani Guillot de Suduiraut, 1999

Synonyms
- Vexillum (Costellaria) alvinobalani Guillot de Suduiraut, 1999

= Vexillum alvinobalani =

Species of gastropod

Vexillum alvinobalani is a species of small sea snail, marine gastropod mollusk in the family Costellariidae, the ribbed miters.

== Description ==
The length of shell varies between 30 mm and 35 mm.

== Distribution ==
This marine species occurs off the Philippines.
