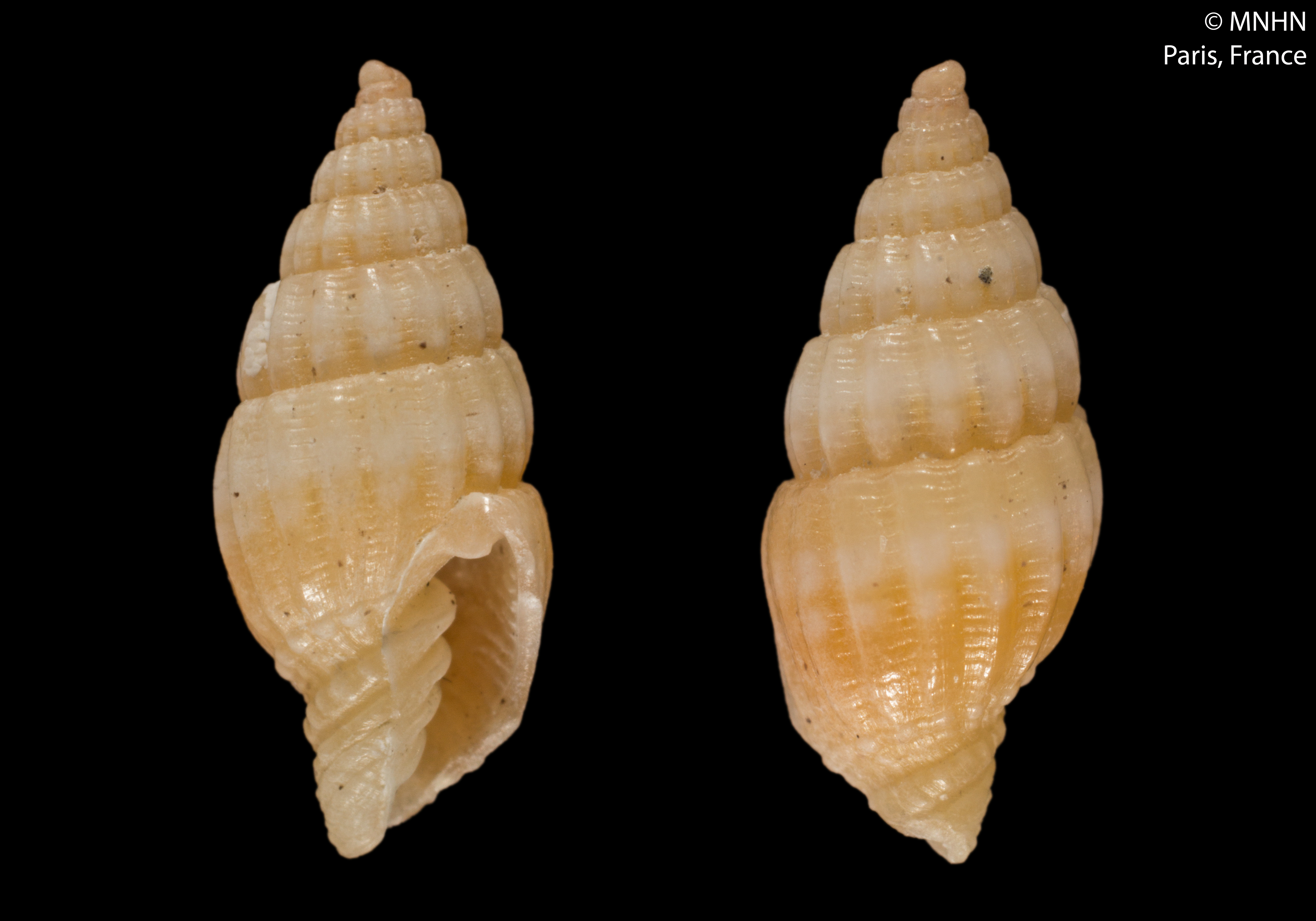
- Shell of Vexillum torquatum (holotype at MNHN, Paris)

Scientific classification
- Kingdom: Animalia
- Phylum: Mollusca
- Class: Gastropoda
- Subclass: Caenogastropoda
- Order: Neogastropoda
- Superfamily: Turbinelloidea
- Family: Costellariidae
- Genus: Vexillum
- Species: V. torquatum

Binomial name
- Vexillum torquatum Herrmann, 2012

Synonyms
- Pusia torquatum (M. Herrmann, 2012); Vexillum (Pusia) torquatum Herrmann, 2012

= Vexillum torquatum =

Species of gastropod

Vexillum torquatum is a species of sea snail, a marine gastropod mollusk, in the family Costellariidae, the ribbed miters.

== Distribution ==
This marine species occurs in French Polynesia.
