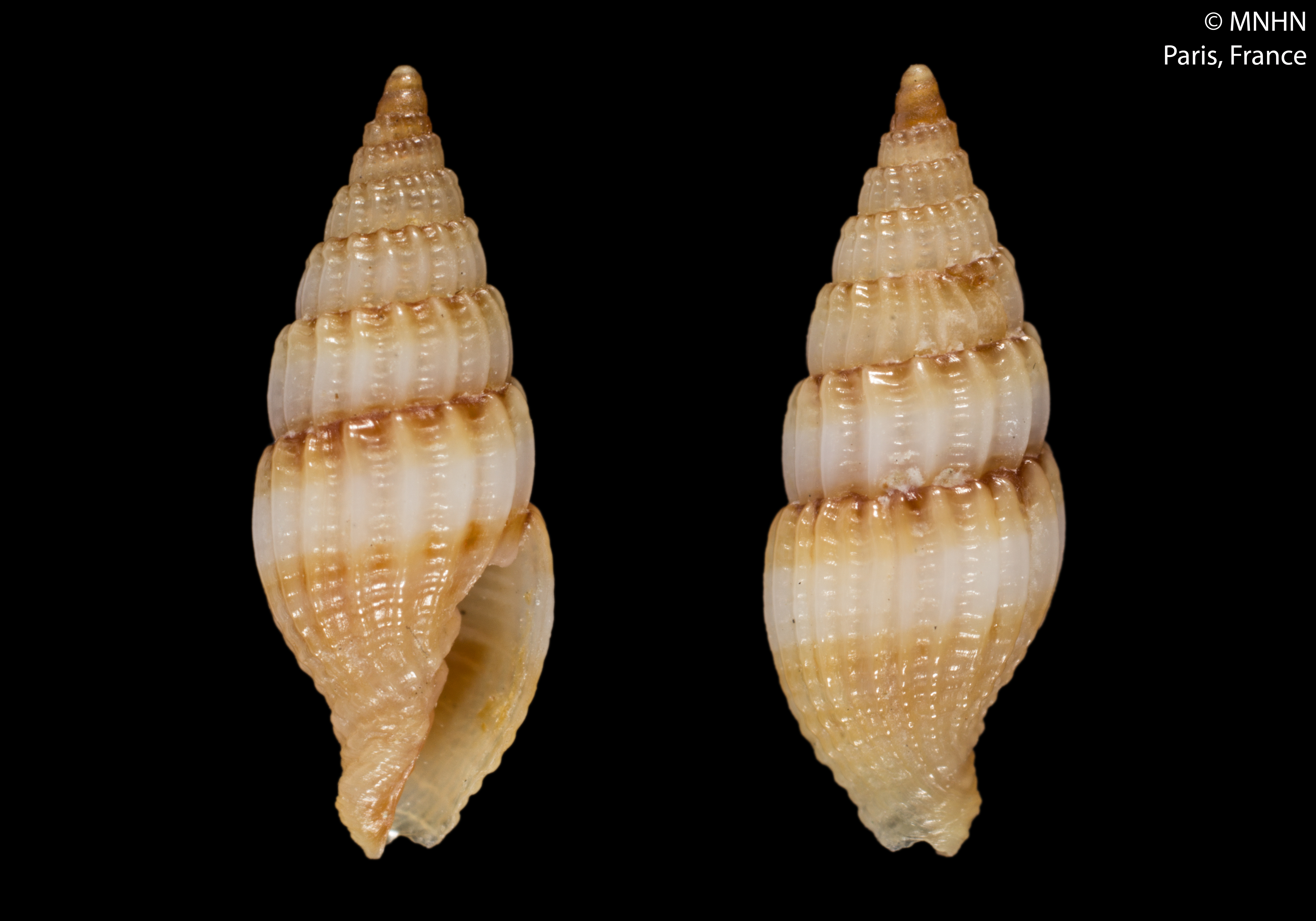

Scientific classification
- Kingdom: Animalia
- Phylum: Mollusca
- Class: Gastropoda
- Subclass: Caenogastropoda
- Order: Neogastropoda
- Family: Costellariidae
- Genus: Vexillum
- Species: V. gouldi

Binomial name
- Vexillum gouldi Salisbury & Guillot de Suduiraut, 2006

Synonyms
- Vexillum (Costellaria) gouldi Salisbury & Guillot de Suduiraut, 2006 · accepted, alternate representation

= Vexillum gouldi =

Species of gastropod

Vexillum gouldi is a species of small sea snail, marine gastropod mollusk in the family Costellariidae, the ribbed miters.

== Description ==
The size of the shell varies between 5.8 mm and 9 mm.

== Distribution ==
This marine species occurs off the Philippines.
