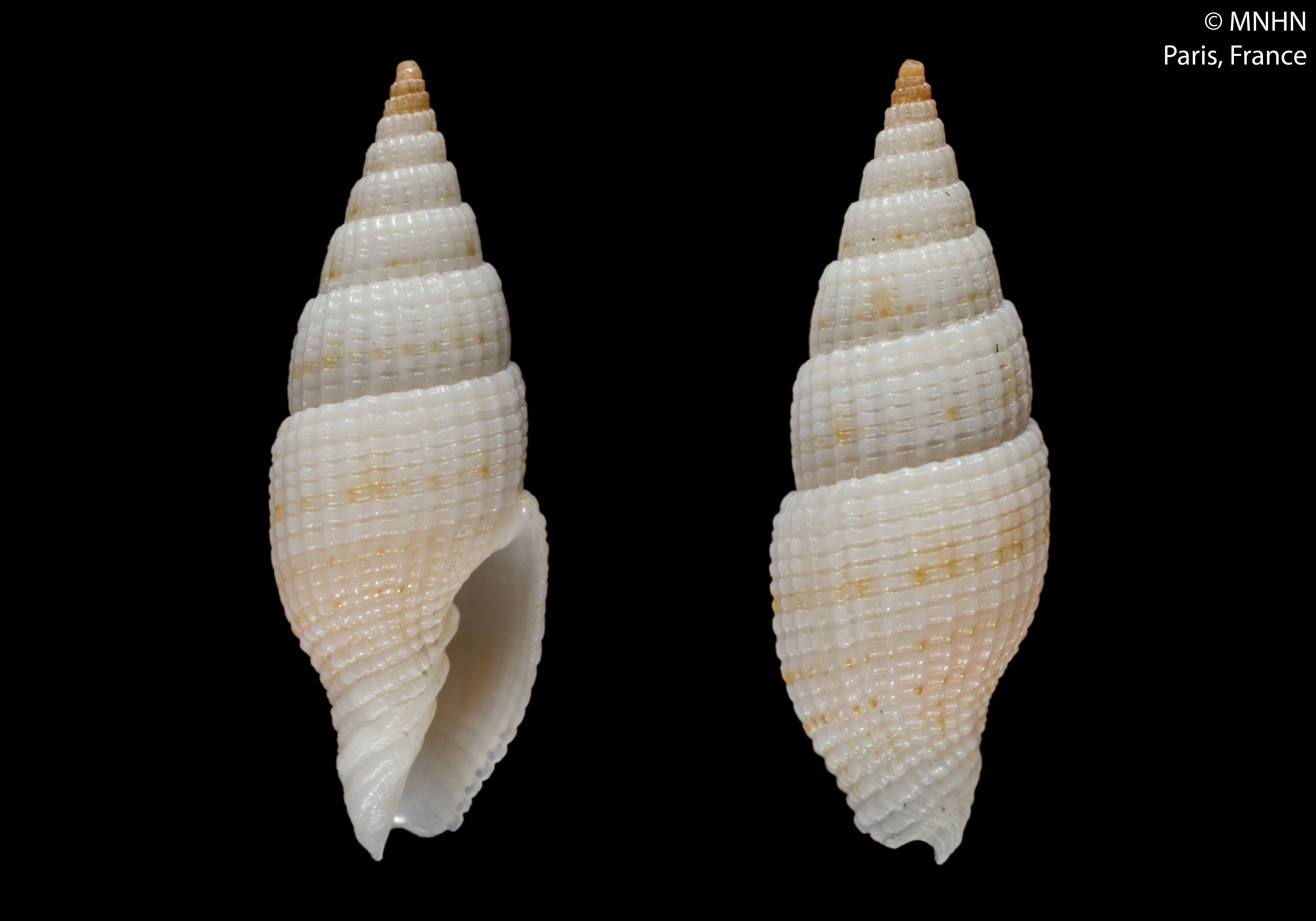
- Shell of Vexillum marotiriense (holotype at MNHN, Paris)

Scientific classification
- Kingdom: Animalia
- Phylum: Mollusca
- Class: Gastropoda
- Subclass: Caenogastropoda
- Order: Neogastropoda
- Superfamily: Turbinelloidea
- Family: Costellariidae
- Genus: Vexillum
- Species: V. marotiriense

Binomial name
- Vexillum marotiriense Herrmann & Salisbury, 2012

Synonyms
- Vexillum (Costellaria) marotiriense Herrmann & Salisbury, 2012

= Vexillum marotiriense =

Species of sea snail

Vexillum marotiriense is a species of sea snail, a marine gastropod mollusk, in the family Costellariidae, the ribbed miters.

== Distribution ==
This marine species occurs in French Polynesia.
