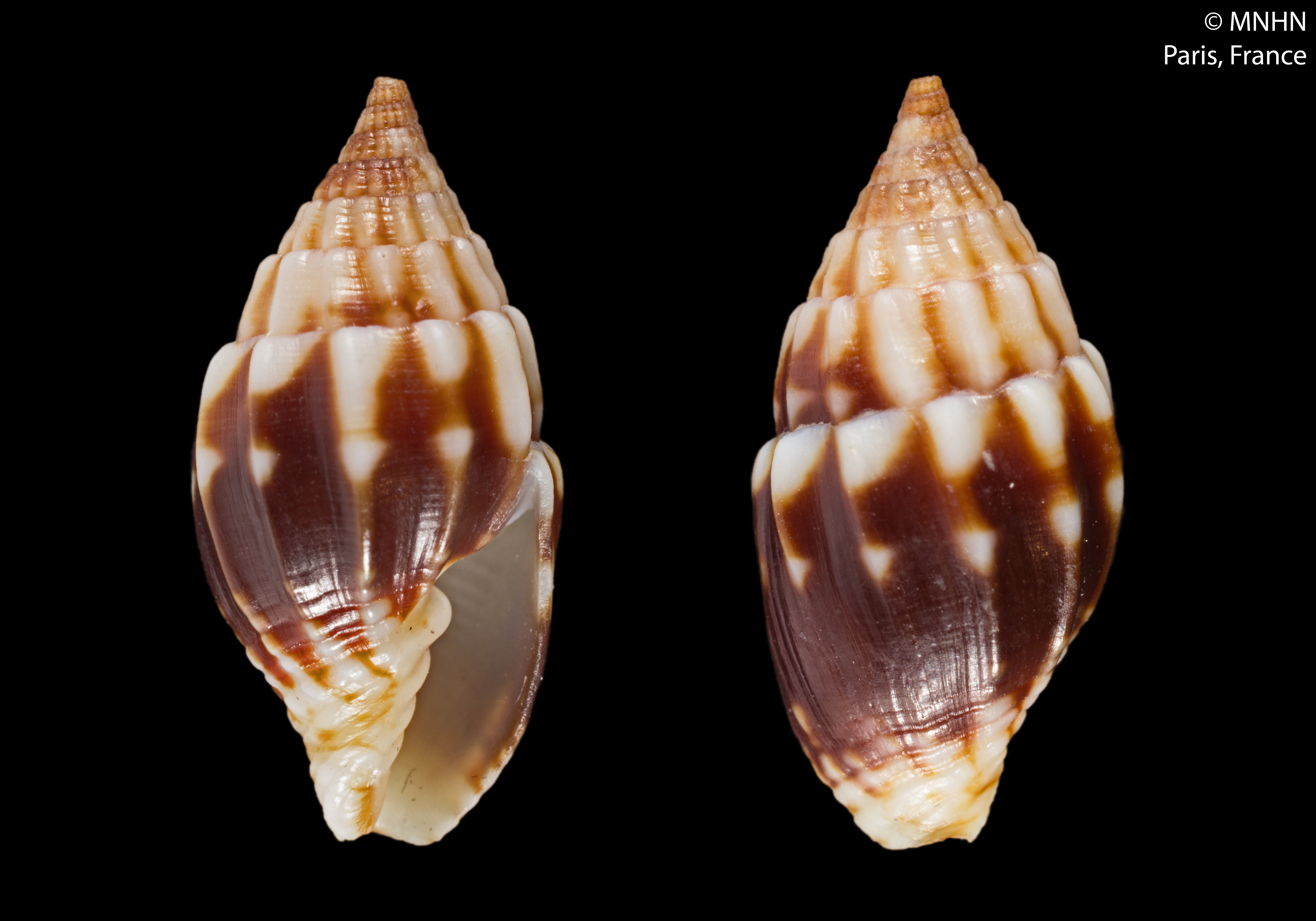

Scientific classification
- Kingdom: Animalia
- Phylum: Mollusca
- Class: Gastropoda
- Subclass: Caenogastropoda
- Order: Neogastropoda
- Superfamily: Turbinelloidea
- Family: Costellariidae
- Genus: Vexillum
- Species: V. gourgueti

Binomial name
- Vexillum gourgueti Salisbury & Herrmann, 2012

Synonyms
- Vexillum (Pusia) gourgueti Salisbury & Herrmann, 2012

= Vexillum gourgueti =

Species of gastropod

Vexillum gourgueti is a species of sea snail, a marine gastropod mollusk, in the family Costellariidae, the ribbed miters.

== Description ==
The length of the shell attains 13 mm.

== Distribution ==
This marine species occurs off the Marquesas Islands.
