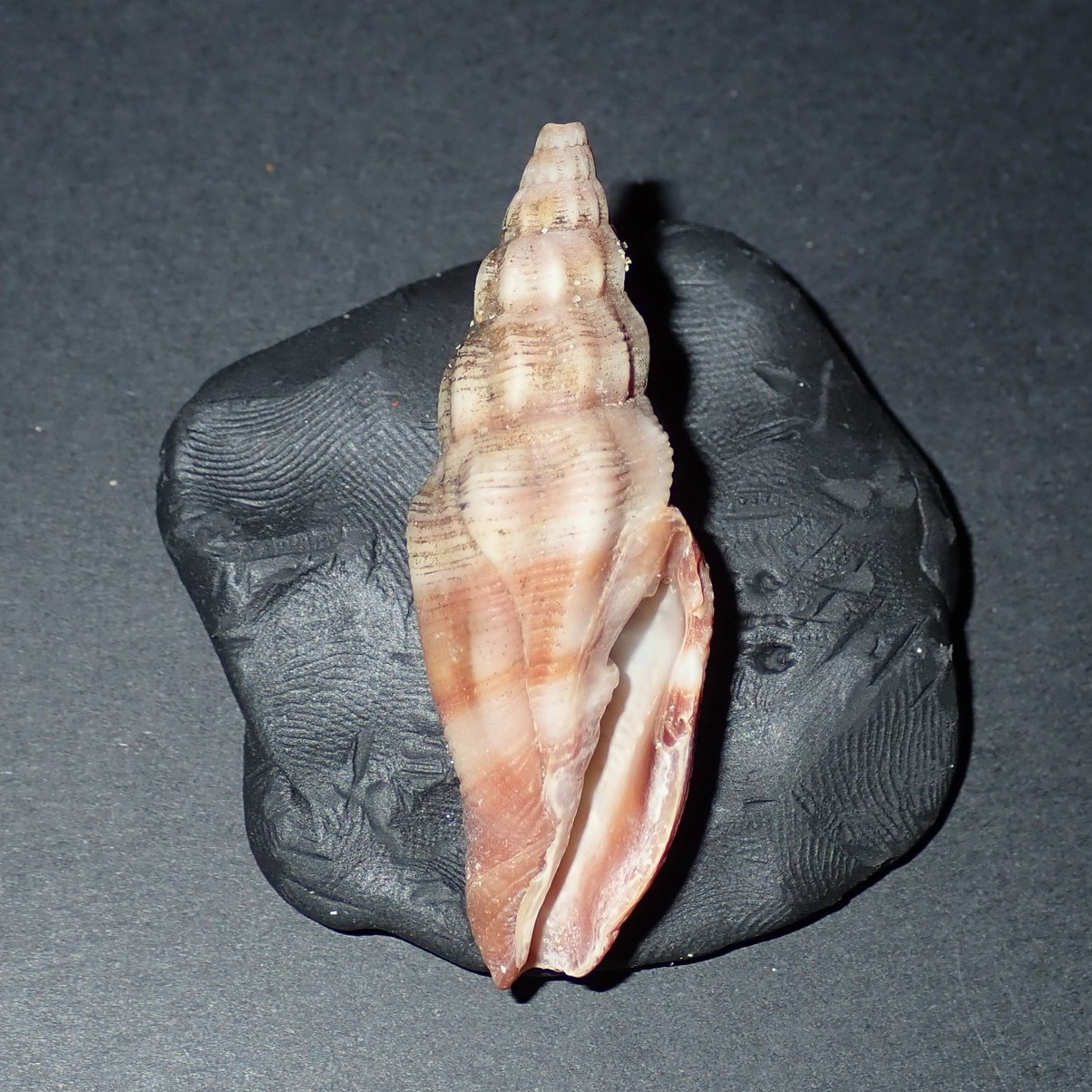

Scientific classification
- Kingdom: Animalia
- Phylum: Mollusca
- Class: Gastropoda
- Subclass: Caenogastropoda
- Order: Neogastropoda
- Superfamily: Turbinelloidea
- Family: Costellariidae
- Genus: Vexillum
- Species: V. jukesii

Binomial name
- Vexillum jukesii (A. Adams, 1853)

Synonyms
- Mitra jukesii A. Adams, 1853 (original combination); Vexillum (Vexillum) jukesii (A. Adams, 1853)

= Vexillum jukesii =

Species of gastropod

Vexillum jukesii is a species of small sea snail, marine gastropod mollusk in the family Costellariidae, the ribbed miters.

== Description ==
The length of the shell attains 54 mm.

== Distribution ==
This marine species occurs off Australia (Northern Territory), the Philippines and Vietnam.
