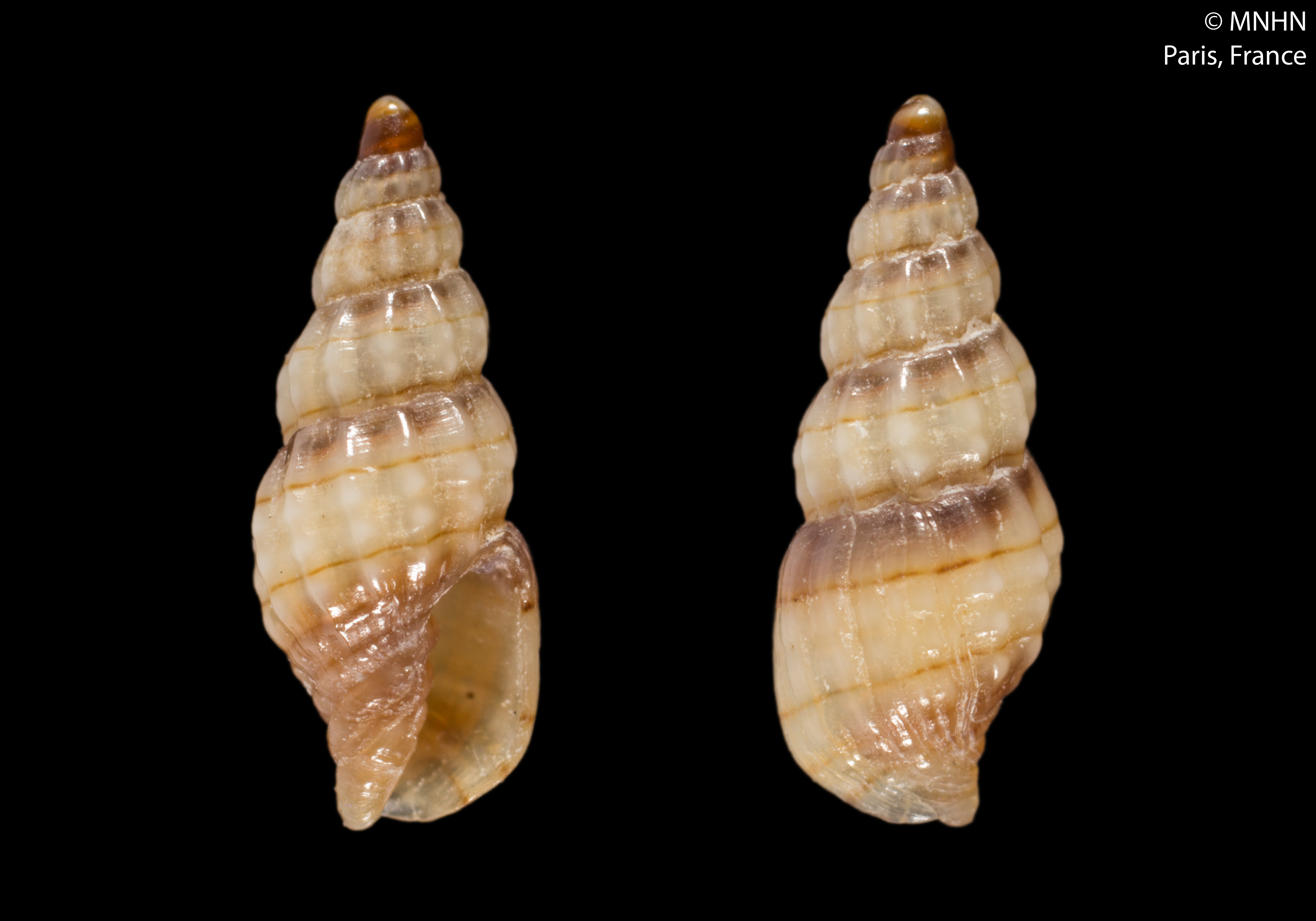

Scientific classification
- Kingdom: Animalia
- Phylum: Mollusca
- Class: Gastropoda
- Subclass: Caenogastropoda
- Order: Neogastropoda
- Superfamily: Turbinelloidea
- Family: Costellariidae
- Genus: Vexillum
- Species: V. volae

Binomial name
- Vexillum volae Perugia, 2010

Synonyms
- Pusia volae I. Perugia, 2010; Vexillum (Pusia) volae Perugia, 2010

= Vexillum volae =

Species of gastropod

Vexillum volae is a species of sea snail, a marine gastropod mollusk, in the family Costellariidae, the ribbed miters.

== Description ==
The length of the shell attains 7 mm.

== Distribution ==
This marine species occurs off Madagascar.
