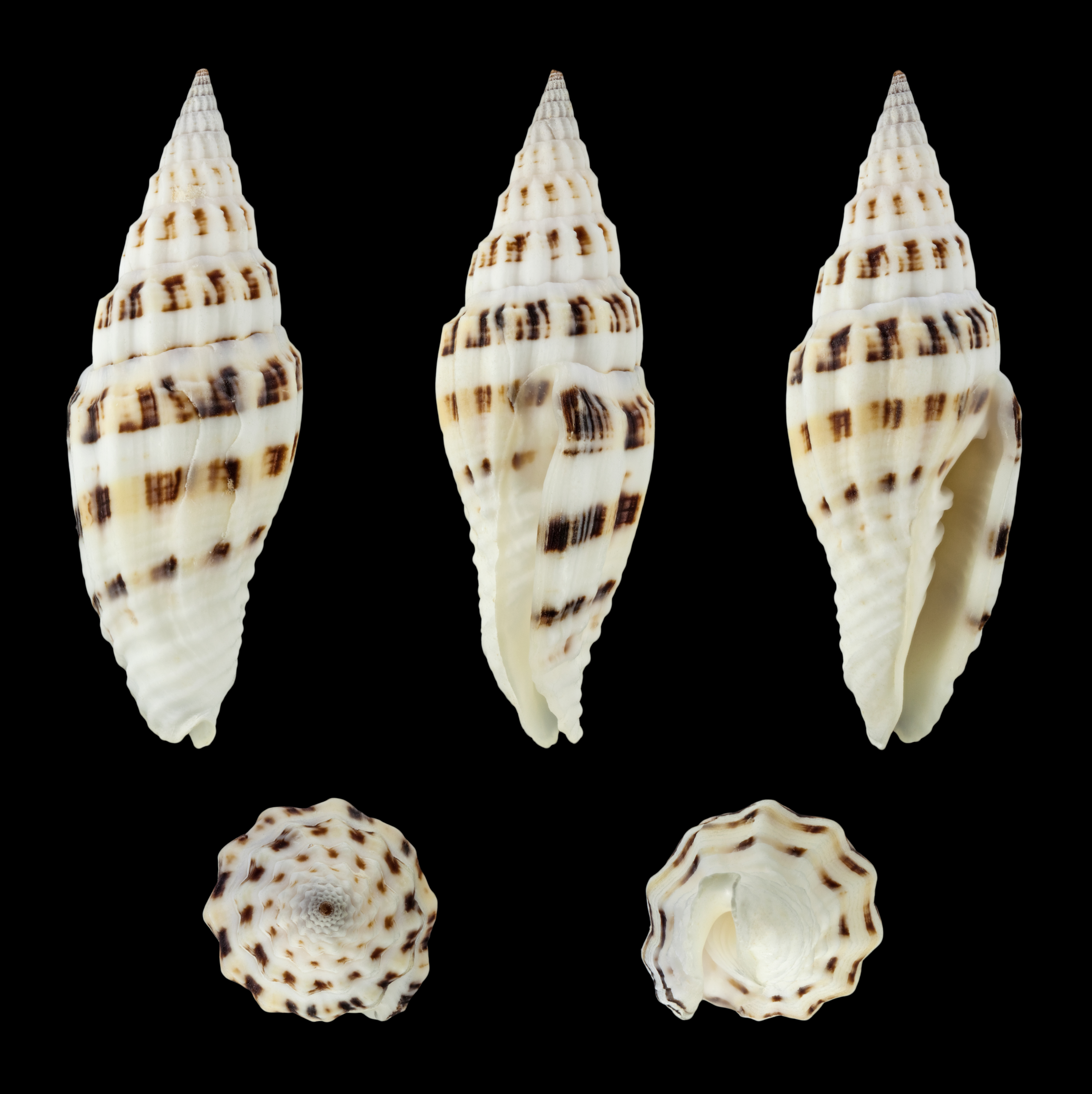

Scientific classification
- Kingdom: Animalia
- Phylum: Mollusca
- Class: Gastropoda
- Subclass: Caenogastropoda
- Order: Neogastropoda
- Family: Costellariidae
- Genus: Vexillum
- Species: V. albofulvum

Binomial name
- Vexillum albofulvum Herrmann, 2007

Synonyms
- Vexillum (Vexillum) albofulvum Herrmann, 2007

= Vexillum albofulvum =

Species of gastropod

Vexillum albofulvum is a species of small sea snail, marine gastropod mollusc in the family Costellariidae, the ribbed miters.

== Description ==
The shell size varies between 45 mm and 65 mm.

== Distribution ==
This species is found along the Philippines.
