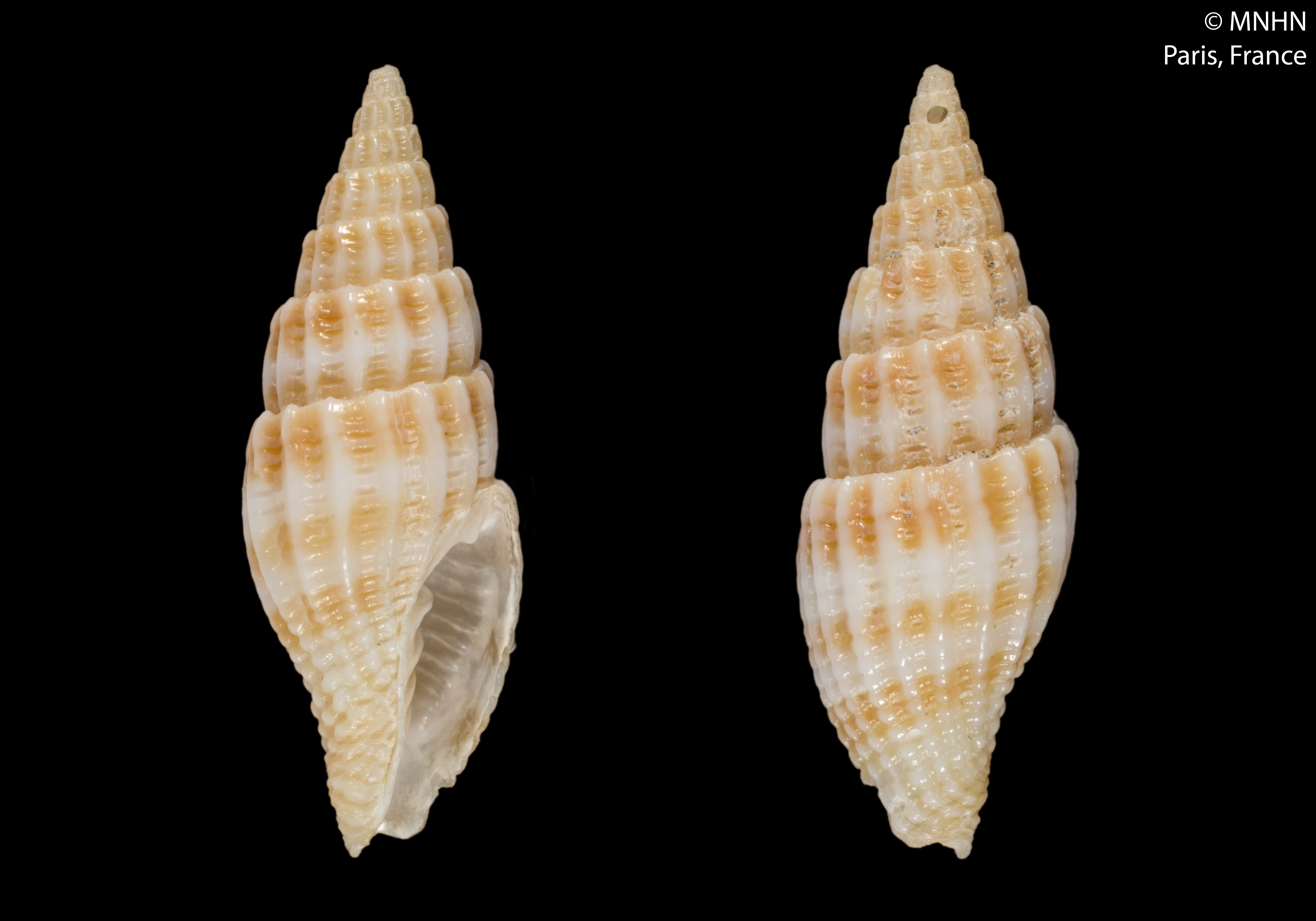

Scientific classification
- Kingdom: Animalia
- Phylum: Mollusca
- Class: Gastropoda
- Subclass: Caenogastropoda
- Order: Neogastropoda
- Superfamily: Turbinelloidea
- Family: Costellariidae
- Genus: Vexillum
- Species: V. troendlei

Binomial name
- Vexillum troendlei Herrmann & Salisbury, 2012

Synonyms
- Vexillum (Costellaria) troendlei Herrmann & Salisbury, 2012

= Vexillum troendlei =

Species of gastropod

Vexillum troendlei is a species of sea snail, a marine gastropod mollusk, in the family Costellariidae, the ribbed miters.

== Distribution ==
This marine species occurs off the Marquesas Islands.
