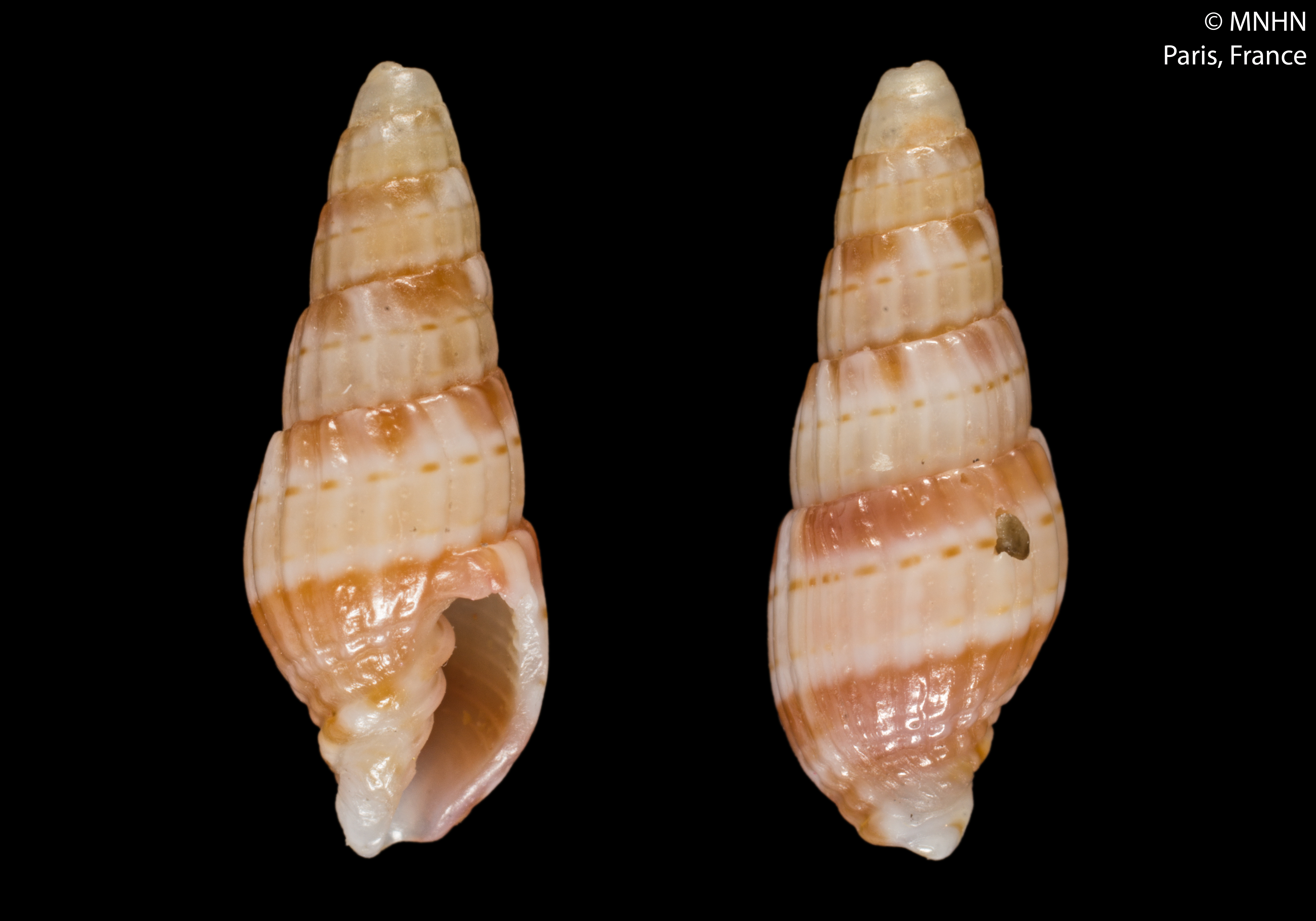
- Vexillum fuscobandatum (holotype at MNHN, Paris)

Scientific classification
- Kingdom: Animalia
- Phylum: Mollusca
- Class: Gastropoda
- Subclass: Caenogastropoda
- Order: Neogastropoda
- Family: Costellariidae
- Genus: Vexillum
- Species: V. fuscobandatum

Binomial name
- Vexillum fuscobandatum Bozzetti, 2007

= Vexillum fuscobandatum =

Species of gastropod

Vexillum fuscobandatum is a species of small sea snail, marine gastropod mollusk in the family Costellariidae, the ribbed miters.

== Description ==
The length of the shell attains 9.6 mm.

== Distribution ==
This marine species occurs off Madagascar.
