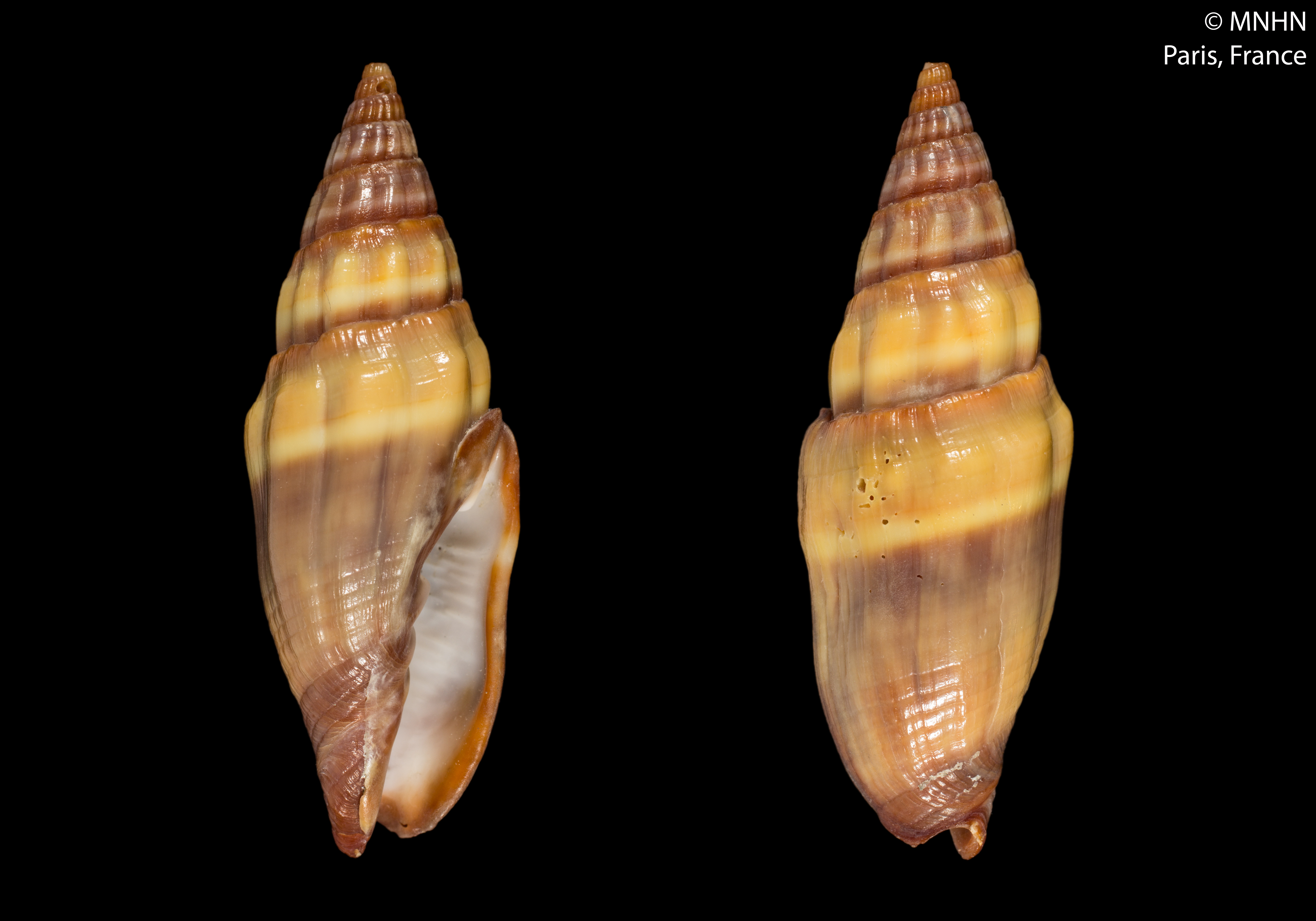
- Shell of Vexillum houarti (paratype at MNHN, Paris)

Scientific classification
- Kingdom: Animalia
- Phylum: Mollusca
- Class: Gastropoda
- Subclass: Caenogastropoda
- Order: Neogastropoda
- Superfamily: Turbinelloidea
- Family: Costellariidae
- Genus: Vexillum
- Species: V. houarti

Binomial name
- Vexillum houarti Thach, 2016

= Vexillum houarti =

Species of gastropod

Vexillum houarti is a species of sea snail, a marine gastropod mollusk, in the family Costellariidae, the ribbed miters.

== Description ==
The length of the shell attains 52.4 mm.

== Distribution ==
This species occurs in Vietnam.
