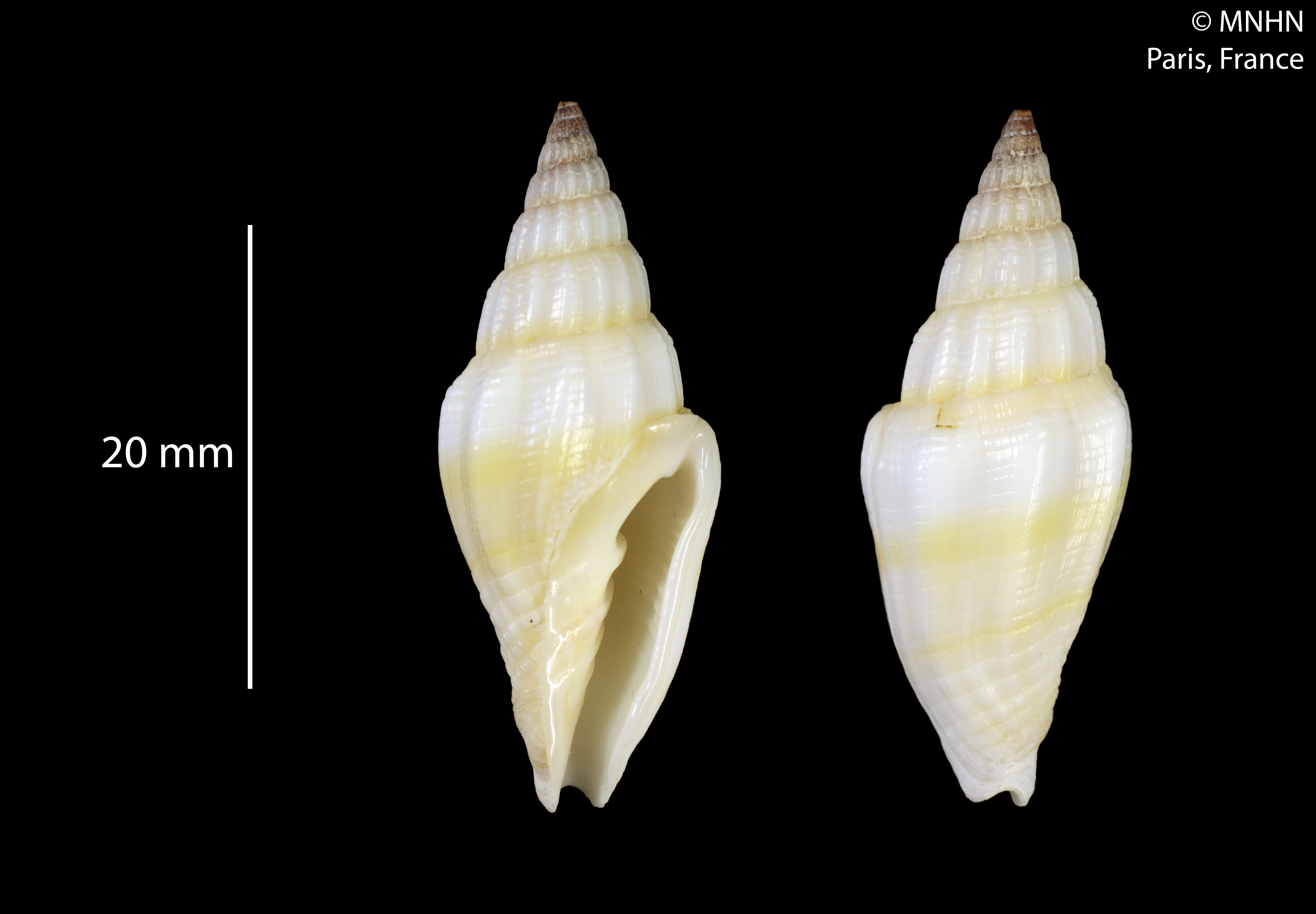
- Shell of Vexillum croceorbis (paratype at MNHN, Paris)

Scientific classification
- Kingdom: Animalia
- Phylum: Mollusca
- Class: Gastropoda
- Subclass: Caenogastropoda
- Order: Neogastropoda
- Superfamily: Turbinelloidea
- Family: Costellariidae
- Genus: Vexillum
- Species: V. croceorbis

Binomial name
- Vexillum croceorbis Dekkers, 2013

= Vexillum croceorbis =

Species of gastropod

Vexillum croceorbis is a species of sea snail, a marine gastropod mollusk, in the family Costellariidae, the ribbed miters.

== Distribution ==
This species occurs in Philippines Exclusive Economic Zone.
