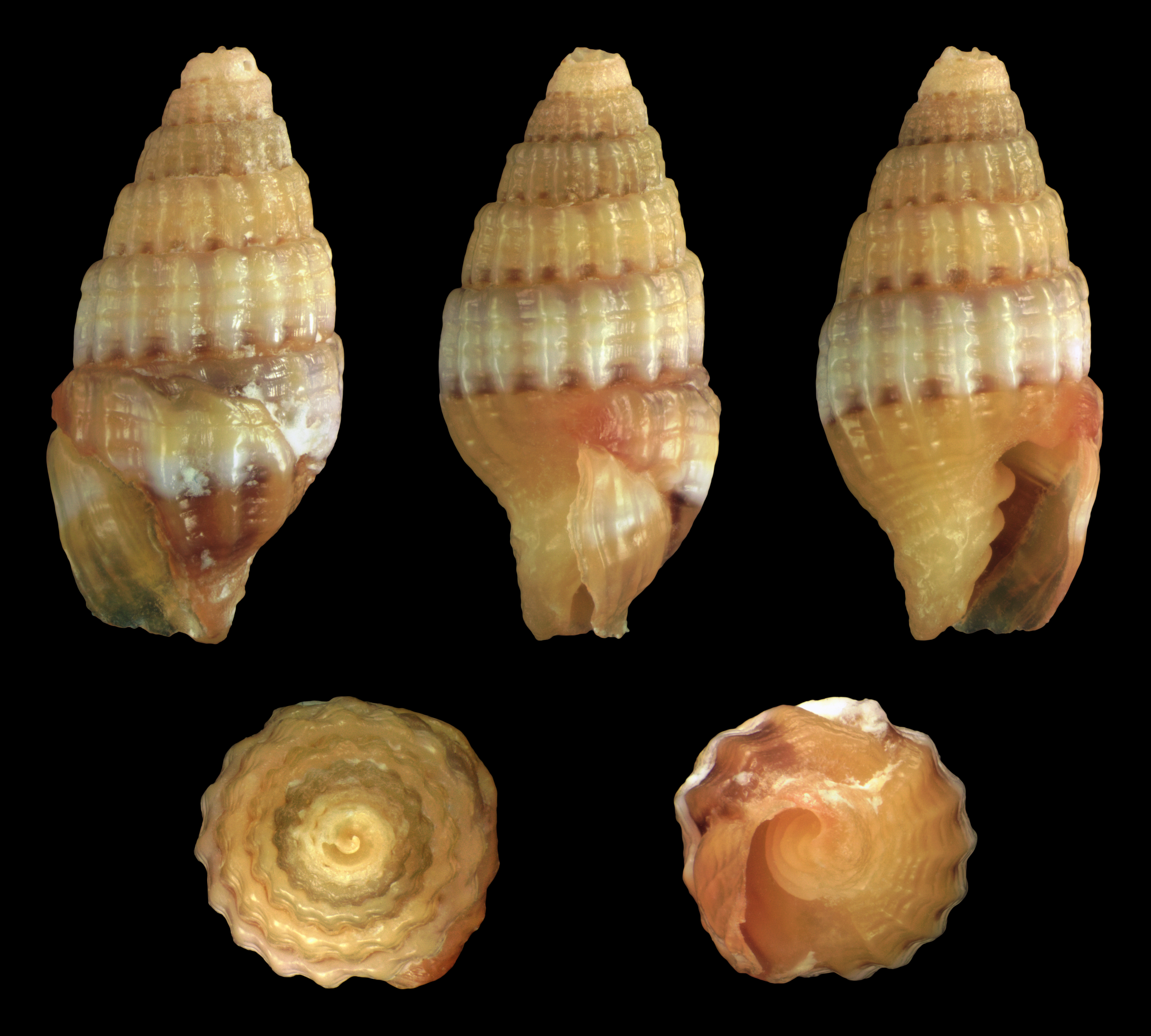
- Shell of Vexillum lenhilli

Scientific classification
- Kingdom: Animalia
- Phylum: Mollusca
- Class: Gastropoda
- Subclass: Caenogastropoda
- Order: Neogastropoda
- Family: Costellariidae
- Genus: Vexillum
- Species: V. lenhilli

Binomial name
- Vexillum lenhilli Kay, 1979

Synonyms
- Vexillum (Pusia) lenhilli Kay, 1979

= Vexillum lenhilli =

Species of gastropod

Vexillum lenhilli is a species of small sea snail, marine gastropod mollusk in the family Costellariidae, the ribbed miters.

== Distribution ==
This marine species occurs off Hawaii and the Philippines.
