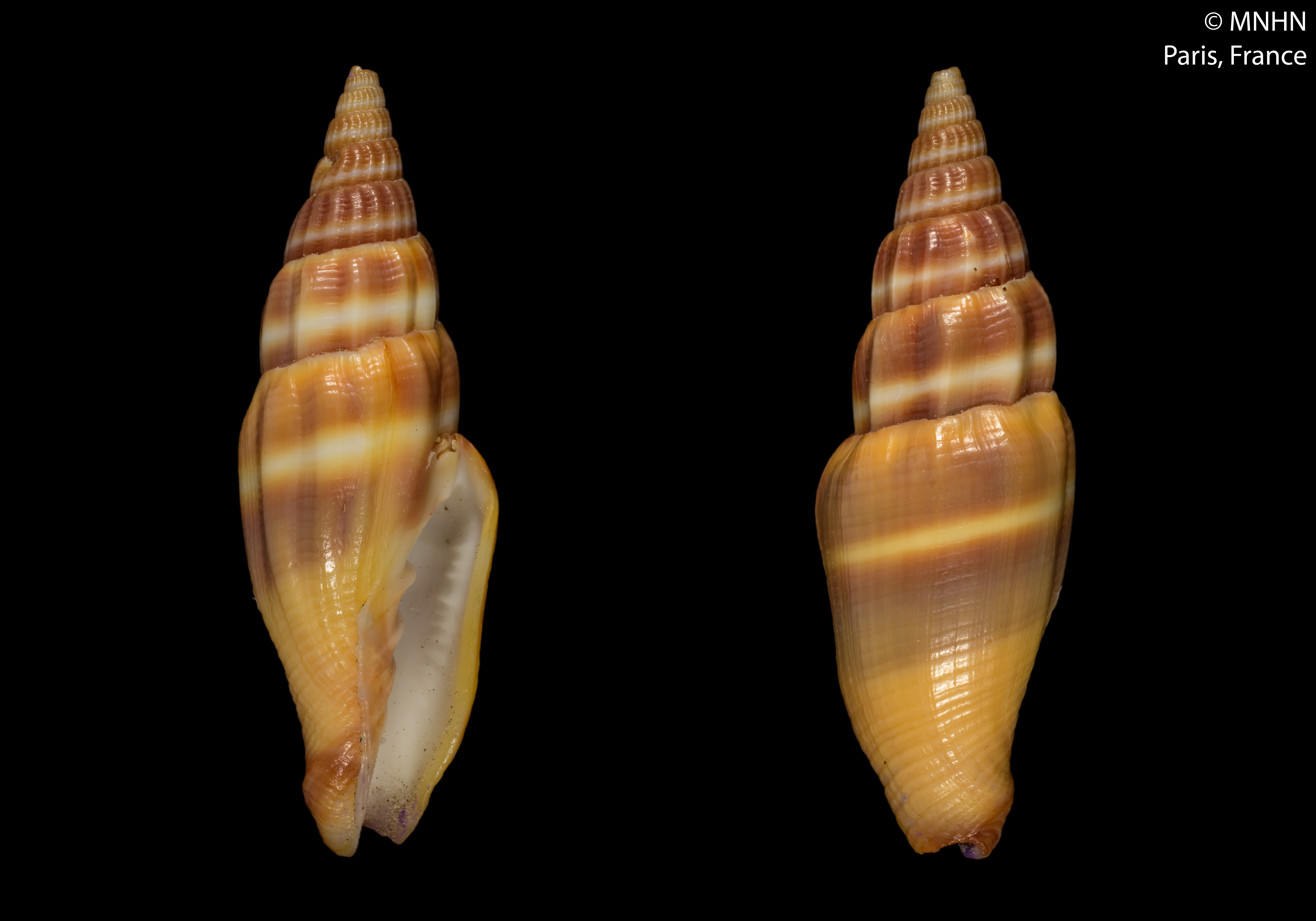
- Shell of Vexillum guidopoppei (holotype at MNHN, Paris)

Scientific classification
- Kingdom: Animalia
- Phylum: Mollusca
- Class: Gastropoda
- Subclass: Caenogastropoda
- Order: Neogastropoda
- Superfamily: Turbinelloidea
- Family: Costellariidae
- Genus: Vexillum
- Species: V. guidopoppei

Binomial name
- Vexillum guidopoppei Thach, 2017

= Vexillum guidopoppei =

Species of gastropod

Vexillum guidopoppei is a species of sea snail, a marine gastropod mollusk, in the family Costellariidae, the ribbed miters.

== Distribution ==
This species occurs in Vietnam.
