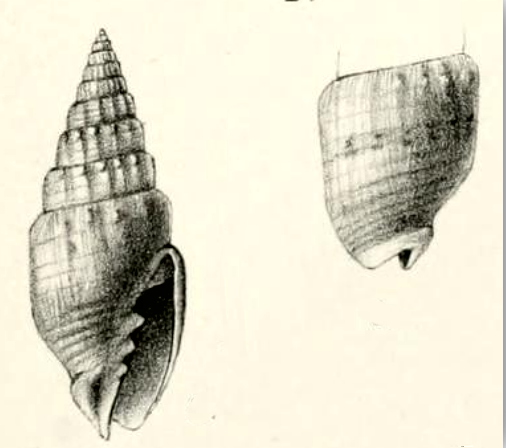
- Shell of Vexillum revelatum (holotype)

Scientific classification
- Kingdom: Animalia
- Phylum: Mollusca
- Class: Gastropoda
- Subclass: Caenogastropoda
- Order: Neogastropoda
- Superfamily: Turbinelloidea
- Family: Costellariidae
- Genus: Vexillum
- Species: V. revelatum

Binomial name
- Vexillum revelatum (Melvill, 1899)

Synonyms
- Mitra (Costellaria) revelata Melvill, 1899 (original combination); Mitra revelata Melvill, 1899 ·

= Vexillum revelatum =

Species of gastropod

Vexillum revelatum is a species of small sea snail, marine gastropod mollusk in the family Costellariidae, the ribbed miters.

== Description ==
The length of the shell attains 21 mm, its diameter 8 mm.

The turriculate, white shell has a fusiform shape. It is solid and little shiny. It exhibits a form more compressed than Vexillum pacificum (Reeve, 1845) It contains 10-11 whorls. The whorls in the protoconch are often pinkish tinged. The other whorls are strongly shouldered, and angulate in the upper portion of each whorl, very rugose. The longitudinal ribs are smooth and obtuse. They are thinly brown-lined, in the middle dark brown-zoned. The white aperture is oblong. The outer lip is straight and thick. The columella is four-plaited.

== Distribution ==
This marine species occurs in the Persian Gulf.
