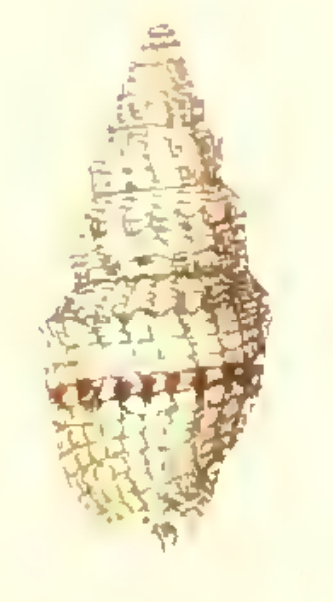
- Drawing of a shell of Vexillum pacificum (holotype)

Scientific classification
- Kingdom: Animalia
- Phylum: Mollusca
- Class: Gastropoda
- Subclass: Caenogastropoda
- Order: Neogastropoda
- Superfamily: Turbinelloidea
- Family: Costellariidae
- Genus: Vexillum
- Species: V. pacificum

Binomial name
- Vexillum pacificum (Reeve, 1845)

Synonyms
- Mitra pacifica Reeve, 1845 (original combination); Mitra (Costellaria) pacifica comtempta Dautzenberg, P. & Bouge, L.J. 1923; Mitra (Costellaria) pacifica rosea Dautzenberg, P. & Bouge, L.J. 1923; Mitra wisemani Dohrn, 1860; Vexillum (Costellaria) pacificum (Reeve, 1845)

= Vexillum pacificum =

Species of gastropod

Vexillum pacificum, the Pacific mitre, is a species of small sea snail, marine gastropod mollusk in the family Costellariidae, the ribbed miters.

== Description ==
The length of the shell varies between 11 mm and 19 mm.

(Original description) The rather thick shell is elongately ovate. The spire is turreted. The whorls are angulated at the upper part, longitudinally ridged, ridges numerous, narrow, transversely impressly grooved. The shell is white, encircled with a brown band between the ridges only. The columella is four-plaited, uppermost plait much the largest. The aperture is rather short.

== Distribution ==
This species occurs in the Indo-West and Central Pacific; off Mozambique, Réunion, Guam, the Loyalty Islands, Indonesia, the Philippines and off Australia (New South Wales, Northern Territory, Queensland, Western Australia).
