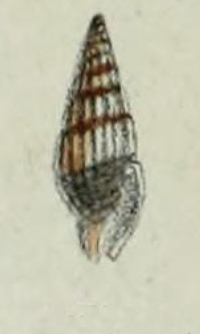
- Original image of a shell of Vexillum gotoense

Scientific classification
- Kingdom: Animalia
- Phylum: Mollusca
- Class: Gastropoda
- Subclass: Caenogastropoda
- Order: Neogastropoda
- Superfamily: Turbinelloidea
- Family: Costellariidae
- Genus: Vexillum
- Species: V. gotoense

Binomial name
- Vexillum gotoense (E. A. Smith, 1879)

Synonyms
- Mitra (Costellaria) gotoensis E. A. Smith, 1879 (basionym); Mitra gotoensis E. A. Smith, 1879 (original combination); Vexillum (Costellaria) gotoense (E. A. Smith, 1879)

= Vexillum gotoense =

Species of gastropod

Vexillum gotoense is a species of small sea snail, marine gastropod mollusk in the family Costellariidae, the ribbed miters.

== Description ==
The length of the shell varies between 11 mm and 17 mm.

(Original description, slightly rephrased) The shell is like the species Vexillum collinsoni, but with thicker ribs and consequently narrower interstices. It is white, stained with light purplish brown at the inferior margin of the upper whorls, and with the lower half of the body whorl of the same colour. The apex is also stained with brown. The shell consists of nine whorls and is trifle convex. There are 18 slightly arcuate ribs on a whorl. The sutures are transversely sulcated. The sulci number six to seven on the penultimate whorl, and about sixteen on the body whorl. The columella contains four plaits. The aperture is small, internally lirate and white at the margin of the outer lip.

== Distribution ==
This marine species occurs off Japan and Guam.
