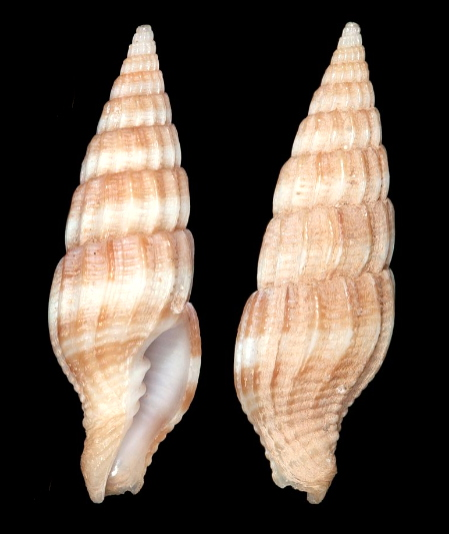
- Shell of Vexillum collinsoni (specimen at the Smithsonian Institution)

Scientific classification
- Kingdom: Animalia
- Phylum: Mollusca
- Class: Gastropoda
- Subclass: Caenogastropoda
- Order: Neogastropoda
- Superfamily: Turbinelloidea
- Family: Costellariidae
- Genus: Vexillum
- Species: V. collinsoni

Binomial name
- Vexillum collinsoni (A. Adams, 1864)

Synonyms
- Costellaria collinsoni A. Adams, 1864 (original combination); Vexillum (Costellaria) collinsoni (A. Adams, 1864)

= Vexillum collinsoni =

Species of gastropod

Vexillum collinsoni is a species of small sea snail, marine gastropod mollusk in the family Costellariidae, the ribbed miters.

== Description ==
The length of the shell varies between 10 mm and 16 mm.

The shell is whitish, stained with brown at the apex, obscurely banded with bluish ash a little below the top of the whorls, and spotted irregularly with brown in the same part, generally between the ribs. The lower half of the body whorl is cinereous brown.

== Distribution ==
This marine species occurs off Japan, the Philippines, Papua New Guinea and Hawaii; in the Indian Ocean off Mozambique.
