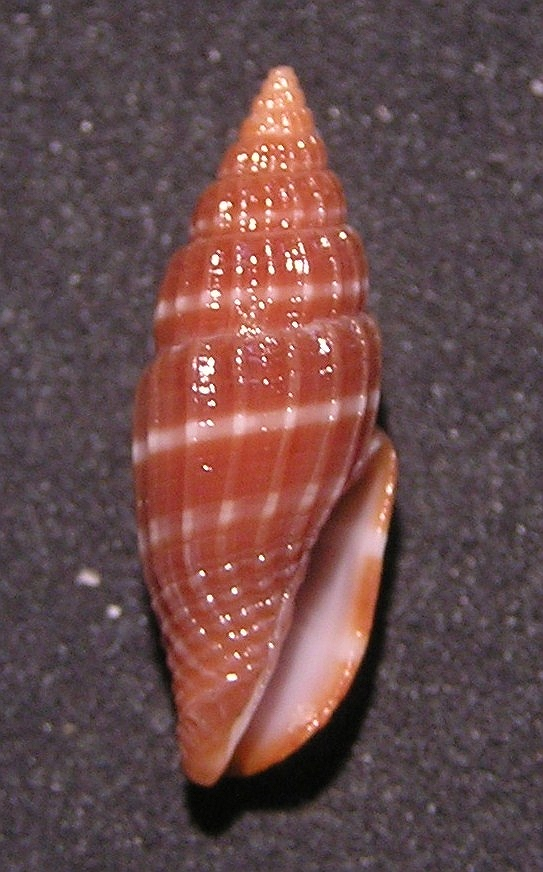
- Vexillum exaratum

Scientific classification
- Kingdom: Animalia
- Phylum: Mollusca
- Class: Gastropoda
- Subclass: Caenogastropoda
- Order: Neogastropoda
- Superfamily: Turbinelloidea
- Family: Costellariidae
- Genus: Vexillum
- Species: V. exaratum

Binomial name
- Vexillum exaratum (A. Adams, 1853

Synonyms
- Mitra exarata A. Adams, 1853 (original combination); Mitra nigritella Bartsch, 1918 (original combination); Vexillum (Pusia) exaratum (A. Adams, 1853); Vexillum nigritella (Bartsch, 1918)

= Vexillum exaratum =

Species of gastropod

Vexillum exaratum is a species of small sea snail, marine gastropod mollusk in the family Costellariidae, the ribbed miters.

== Description ==
(Described as Vexillum nigritella) The shell is very elongate ovate. It is very dark brown excepting a narrow white zone which encircles the whorls immediately above the periphery. The whorls of the protoconch are well rounded, feebly, roundly shouldered at the summit. The whorls of the teleoconch are marked by rather strong moderately broad, almost vertical axial ribs, which are eroded on the earlier whorls but of which eighteen occur upon the fourth, twenty upon the remaining whorls, of the type. In addition to the axial ribs which extend feebly to the very apex of the base on the body whorl, the entire surface is marked by fine lines of growth. The spiral sculpture consists of slightly sinuous threads which are equal and sub-equally spaced. Of these threads, eight occur between the summit and the suture on the body whorl. The suture is strongly marked. The base of the shell is marked in addition to the continuations of the axial ribs on the anterior half by nine spiral threads equalling those of the spire in strength and on the anterior half by six cords, which are much stronger and more distantly spaced, and which render their junctions with the ribs slightly nodulose. A strong tumidity encircles the base at the anterior columellar fold. The aperture is narrow. The posterior angle is acute, decidedly channeled anteriorly. The outer lip somewhat sinuous. The inner lip is reflected over and appressed to the base, provided with three oblique folds which decrease in size successively from the posterior anteriorly. The parietal wall is covered by a moderately thick callus, which is of equal strength throughout its extent.

== Distribution ==
This marine species occurs off the Philippines.
