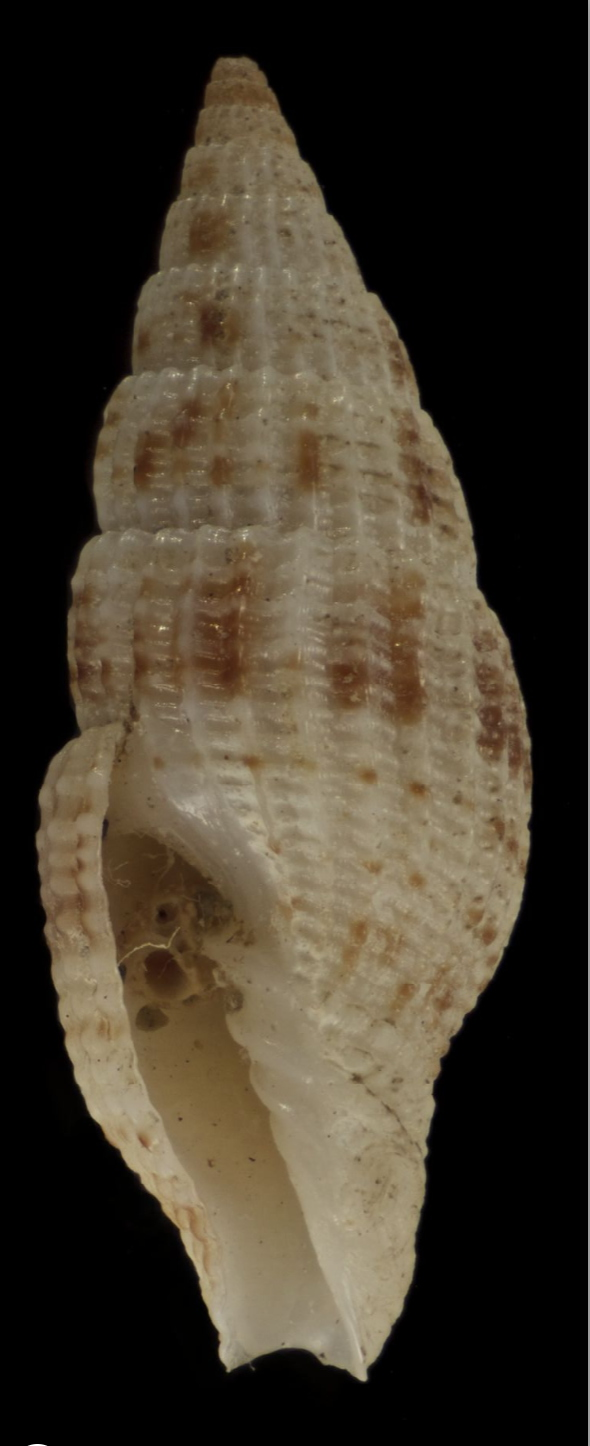
- Shell of Vexillum iredalei (specimen at the Natural History Museum of Denmark)

Scientific classification
- Kingdom: Animalia
- Phylum: Mollusca
- Class: Gastropoda
- Subclass: Caenogastropoda
- Order: Neogastropoda
- Family: Costellariidae
- Genus: Vexillum
- Species: V. iredalei

Binomial name
- Vexillum iredalei (Powell, 1958)

Synonyms
- Mitropifex iredalei Powell, 1958; Vexillum (Costellaria) iredalei (Powell, 1958)

= Vexillum iredalei =

Species of gastropod

Vexillum iredalei is a species of small sea snail, marine gastropod mollusk in the family Costellariidae, the ribbed miters.

== Description ==
The length of the shell attains 13 mm.

== Distribution ==
This marine species occurs of the Kermadec Islands and the Philippines.
