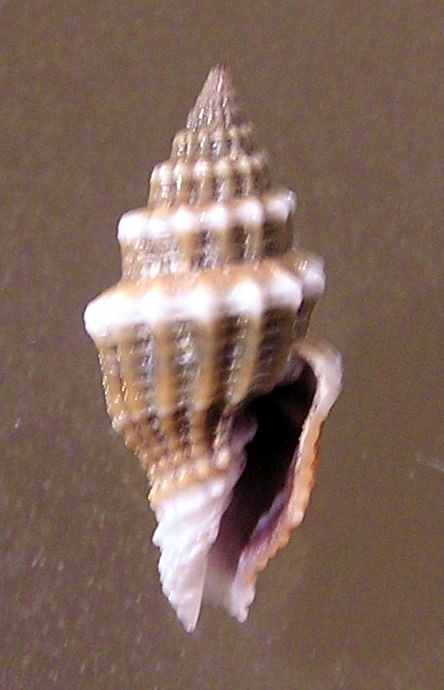

Scientific classification
- Kingdom: Animalia
- Phylum: Mollusca
- Class: Gastropoda
- Subclass: Caenogastropoda
- Order: Neogastropoda
- Superfamily: Turbinelloidea
- Family: Costellariidae
- Genus: Vexillum
- Species: V. mutabile

Binomial name
- Vexillum mutabile (Reeve, 1845)

Synonyms
- Mitra montrouzieri Souverbie, 1875(invalid: junior homonym of Mitra...); Mitra mutabilis Reeve, 1845 (original combination); Vexillum (Costellaria) mutabile (Reeve, 1845)

= Vexillum mutabile =

Species of gastropod

Vexillum mutabile, common name the changeable mitre, is a species of small sea snail, marine gastropod mollusk in the family Costellariidae, the ribbed miters.

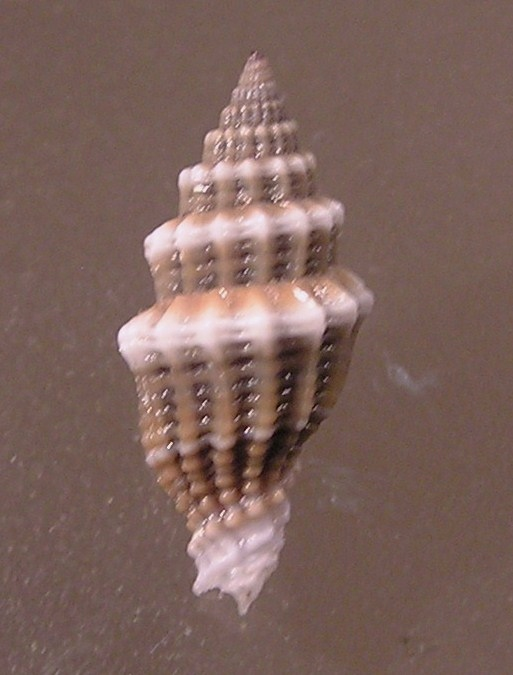
Abapertural view

== Description ==
The length of the shell attains 19 mm.

(Original description) The shell is abbreviately fusiform. The spire is turreted, sometimes elevated, sometimes rather short. The sutures are somewhat deep. The whorls are depressed at the upper part and longitudinally concentrically ribbed. The ribs are narrow, latticed with fine transverse ridges. The shell is whitish, banded with olive-green. The apex is brown. The columella is four-plaited.

== Distribution ==
This marine species occurs off the Philippines, New Caledonia and Papua New Guinea; also off Australia (Queensland).
