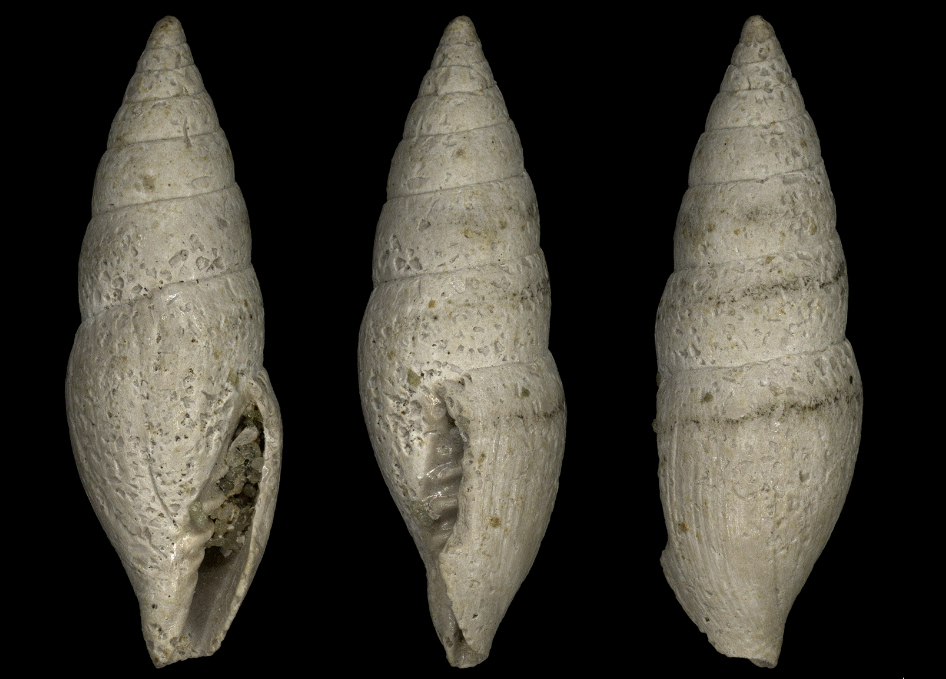
- Shell of Vexillum terebelloides (specimen at MNHN, Paris)

Scientific classification
- Kingdom: Animalia
- Phylum: Mollusca
- Class: Gastropoda
- Subclass: Caenogastropoda
- Order: Neogastropoda
- Superfamily: Turbinelloidea
- Family: Costellariidae
- Genus: Vexillum
- Species: †V. terebelloides

Binomial name
- †Vexillum terebelloides (d'Orbigny, 1850)

Synonyms
- † Conomitra hordeola (Deshayes, 1865); † Mitra terebelloides d'Orbigny, 1850 superseded combination; † Turricula (Fusimitra) terebelloides (d'Orbigny, 1850); † Vexillum (Uromitra) terebelloides (d'Orbigny, 1850) superseded combination

= Vexillum terebelloides =

Species of gastropod

Vexillum terebelloides is an extinct species of sea snail, a marine gastropod mollusk, in the family Costellariidae, the ribbed miters.

== Distribution ==
Fossils of this marine species were found in Eocene strata in Picardy, France.
