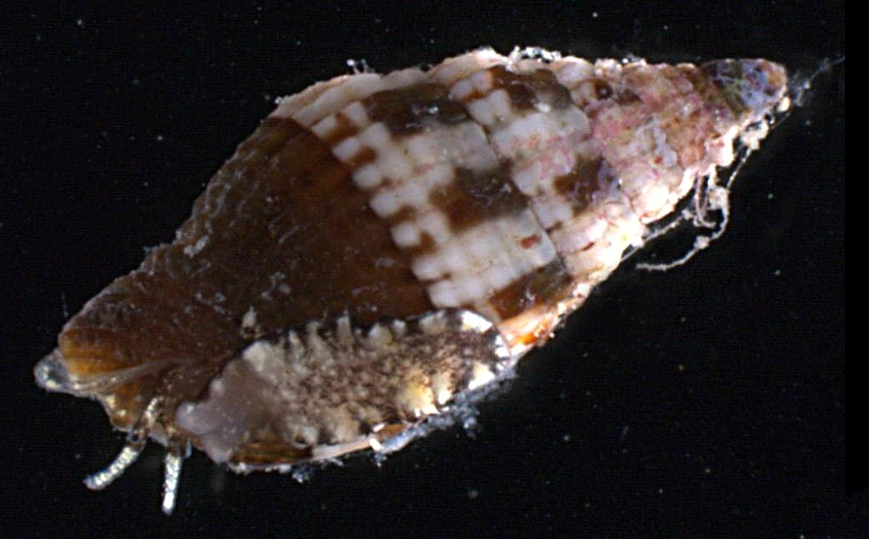
- Vexillum tusum (specimen at the Smithsonian Institution)

Scientific classification
- Kingdom: Animalia
- Phylum: Mollusca
- Class: Gastropoda
- Subclass: Caenogastropoda
- Order: Neogastropoda
- Superfamily: Turbinelloidea
- Family: Costellariidae
- Genus: Vexillum
- Species: V. tusum

Binomial name
- Vexillum tusum (Reeve, 1845)

Synonyms
- Mitra alveolus Reeve, 1845; Mitra olgae Cate, J. 1963; Mitra tusa Reeve, 1845 (original combination); Pusia olgae (L.A. Reeve, 1845); Pusia tusum (Reeve, 1845); Vexillum (Pusia) tusum (Reeve, 1845); Vexillum alveolus (Reeve, 1845) ·

= Vexillum tusum =

Species of gastropod

Vexillum tusum, common name the bruised mitre, is a species of small sea snail, marine gastropod mollusk in the family Costellariidae, the ribbed miters.

== Description ==
The length of the shell attains 8 mm.

(Original description) The shell is ovate. The sutures of the spire are deeply impressed. The shell is longitudinally finely ribbed and transversely impressly striated. The upper part of the whorls is white, ornamented with large squarish brown spots. The lower part is entirely brown. The columella is four-plaited.

== Distribution ==
This marine species occurs off Mozambique, Guam and in French Polynesia; also off the Coral Sea islands and Australia (Queensland).
