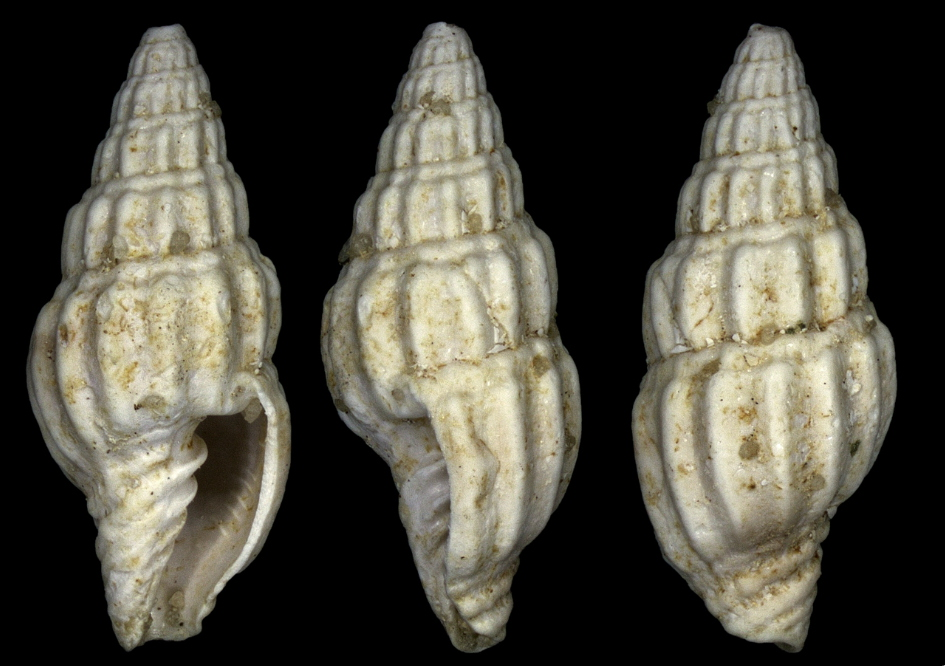
- Shell of Vexillum gaudryi (specimen at MNHN, Paris)

Scientific classification
- Kingdom: Animalia
- Phylum: Mollusca
- Class: Gastropoda
- Subclass: Caenogastropoda
- Order: Neogastropoda
- Superfamily: Turbinelloidea
- Family: Costellariidae
- Genus: Vexillum
- Species: †V. gaudryi

Binomial name
- †Vexillum gaudryi (de Raincourt, 1884)

Synonyms
- † Mitra gaudryi de Raincourt, 1884 superseded combination; † Turricula (Fusimitra) gaudryi (de Raincourt, 1884); † Vexillum (Costellaria) gaudryi (de Raincourt, 1884) superseded combination

= Vexillum gaudryi =

Species of gastropod

Vexillum gaudryi is an extinct species of sea snail, a marine gastropod mollusk, in the family Costellariidae, the ribbed miters.

== Distribution ==
Fossils of this marine species were found in Eocene strata in Ile-de-France, France.
