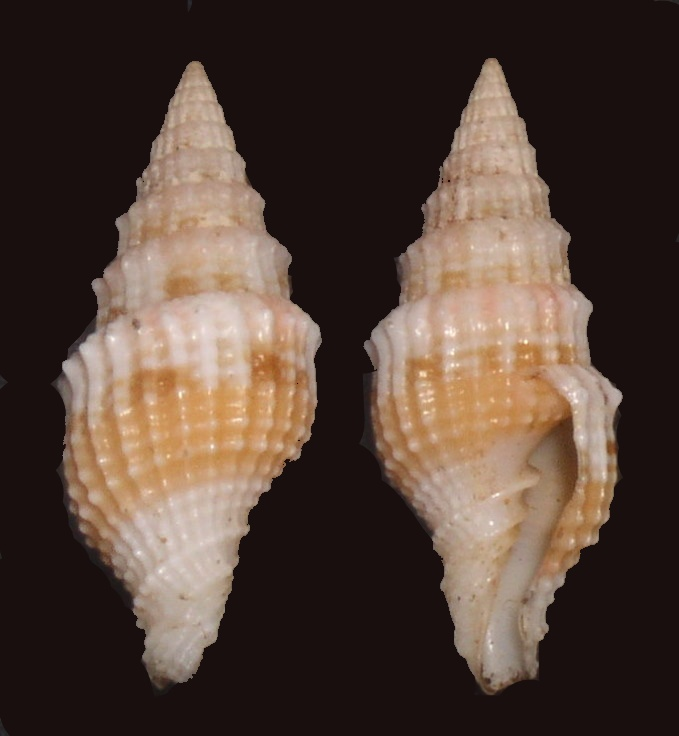

Scientific classification
- Kingdom: Animalia
- Phylum: Mollusca
- Class: Gastropoda
- Subclass: Caenogastropoda
- Order: Neogastropoda
- Superfamily: Turbinelloidea
- Family: Costellariidae
- Genus: Vexillum
- Species: V. potieri

Binomial name
- Vexillum potieri Drivas & Jay, 1989

= Vexillum potieri =

Species of gastropod

Vexillum potieri is a species of sea snail, a marine gastropod mollusk, in the family Costellariidae, the ribbed miters.

== Description ==
The length of the shell varies between 23 mm and 39 mm.

== Distribution ==
This marine species occurs off Mozambique, Réunion, and the Philippines.
