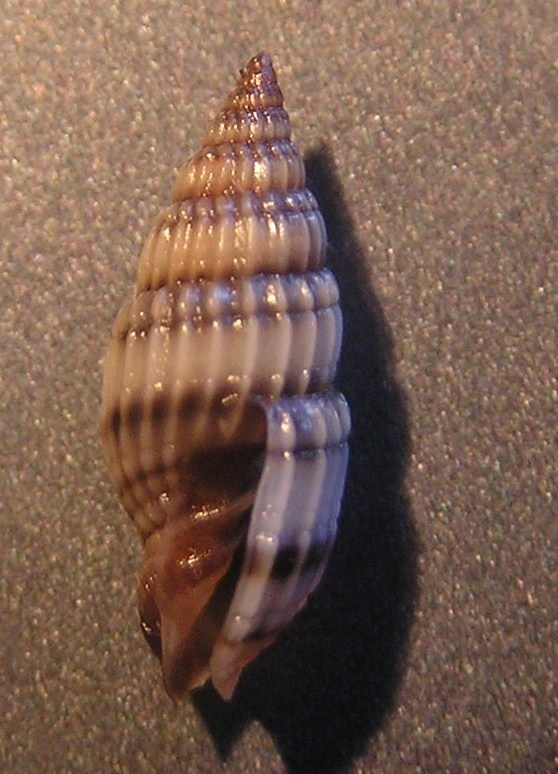
- Vexillum vespula

Scientific classification
- Kingdom: Animalia
- Phylum: Mollusca
- Class: Gastropoda
- Subclass: Caenogastropoda
- Order: Neogastropoda
- Family: Costellariidae
- Genus: Vexillum
- Species: V. vespula

Binomial name
- Vexillum vespula Turner & Marrow, 2001

Synonyms
- Vexillum (Costellaria) vespula H. Turner & Marrow, 2001

= Vexillum vespula =

Species of gastropod

Vexillum vespula is a species of small sea snail, marine gastropod mollusk in the family Costellariidae, the ribbed miters.

== Description ==
The shell size is 16 mm.

== Distribution ==
This species occurs in the seas off the Philippines.
