= Vexillum helena =

Scientific classification
- Kingdom: Animalia
- Phylum: Mollusca
- Class: Gastropoda
- Subclass: Caenogastropoda
- Order: Neogastropoda
- Superfamily: Turbinelloidea
- Family: Costellariidae
- Genus: Vexillum
- Species: V. helena

Binomial name
- Vexillum helena (Bartsch, 1915)

Synonyms
- Mitra helena Bartsch, 1915 (original combination); Vexillum (Pusia) helena (Bartsch, 1915)

Species of gastropod

Vexillum helena is a species of small sea snail, marine gastropod mollusk in the family Costellariidae, the ribbed miters.

== Description ==
The length of the shell attains 15 mm, its diameter 6.6 mm.

(Original description) The small shell is wax-yellow, with two bands of white, the first of which occupies a little more than the anterior half between the sutures, while the second one, which is about half as wide, occupies the middle of the base. The whorls of the protoconch are decollated. The six remaining whorls of the teleoconch are shouldered at the summit, marked by very strong, slightly retractive, axial ribs, of which 16 occur upon the first of the remaining turns, 20 on the second, and 16 upon the rest. In addition to the axial ribs, the whorls are crossed by strong spiral cords, of which five occur between the sutures of the first three and seven upon the fourth and last. The spaces inclosed between the axial ribs and spiral cords are deep pits on the posterior half and deep slits on the anterior half between the sutures. The base is rendered decidedly sigmoid on the left side by the twisting of the anterior portion; marked by the continuations of the axial ribs which extend to the tip of the columella, and 10 spiral cords, of which the 6 posterior to the columella are like those on the spire, while the first 2 on the columella are broader and stronger and more rounded, the last two on the anterior end weaker. The Suture well impressed. The aperture is narrow, channeled anteriorly. The posterior angle is acute. The outer lip is marked by 12, slender, spiral lirations within. The columella is provided with four oblique folds, which decrease regularly in size from the posterior to the anterior. They also become more oblique in the same order.

== Distribution ==
This marine species occurs off South Africa.
