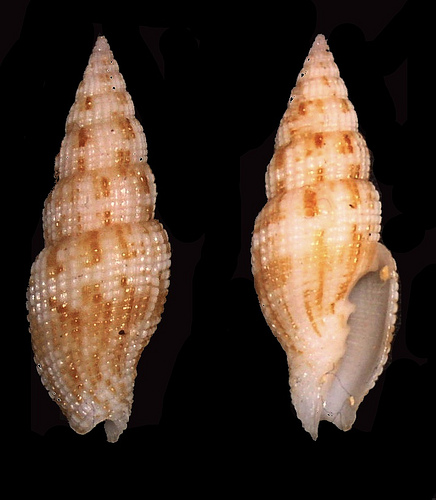
- Vexillum (Costellaria) acupictum

Scientific classification
- Kingdom: Animalia
- Phylum: Mollusca
- Class: Gastropoda
- Subclass: Caenogastropoda
- Order: Neogastropoda
- Superfamily: Turbinelloidea
- Family: Costellariidae
- Genus: Vexillum
- Species: V. acupictum

Binomial name
- Vexillum acupictum (Reeve, 1845)

Synonyms
- Mitra acupicta Reeve, 1844; Mitra autumnalis Dohrn, 1860; Mitra hirasei Pilsbry, H.A., 1904; Vexillum (Costellaria) acupictum (Reeve, 1845)

= Vexillum acupictum =

Species of gastropod

Vexillum acupictum, common name : the pinpricked mitre, is a species of small sea snail, marine gastropod mollusk in the family Costellariidae, the ribbed miters.

== Description ==
The shell size varies between 13 mm and 46 mm

The white shell is tinged with yellowish or pink, profusely spotted and maculated with chestnut or chocolate color.

== Distribution ==
This species occurs in the Red Sea, in the Indian Ocean off Madagascar, the Mascarene Basin and Mauritius, and in the Western Pacific Ocean and Japan; also off New Caledonia and Australia (Queensland).
