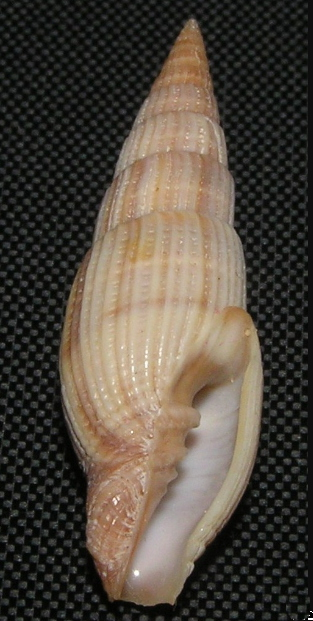
- Shell of Vexillum rubricatum

Scientific classification
- Kingdom: Animalia
- Phylum: Mollusca
- Class: Gastropoda
- Subclass: Caenogastropoda
- Order: Neogastropoda
- Superfamily: Turbinelloidea
- Family: Costellariidae
- Genus: Vexillum
- Species: V. rubricatum

Binomial name
- Vexillum rubricatum (Reeve, 1845)

Synonyms
- Mitra impressa Reeve, 1844 (invalid: junior homonym of Mitra...); Mitra rubricata Reeve, 1845 (original combination); Vexillum (Costellaria) rubricatum (Reeve, 1845) ·

= Vexillum rubricatum =

Species of gastropod

Vexillum rubricatum is a species of small sea snail, marine gastropod mollusk in the family Costellariidae, the ribbed miters.

== Description ==
The length of the shell attains 14.9 mm.

The acuminate spire is twice as long as the aperture. The teleoconch contains nine whorls, the protoconch three smooth whorls. The shell shows sixteen shallow longitudinal ribs, slightly incised by spiral striae. These are deepened in the interstices. The shell has a cream color with small brown spots at the bottom of the whorls.

== Distribution ==
This marine species occurs off Réunion and Japan.
