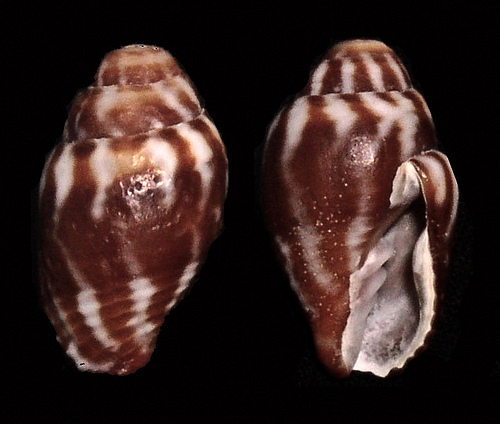
- Vexillum cavea

Scientific classification
- Kingdom: Animalia
- Phylum: Mollusca
- Class: Gastropoda
- Subclass: Caenogastropoda
- Order: Neogastropoda
- Superfamily: Turbinelloidea
- Family: Costellariidae
- Genus: Vexillum
- Species: V. cavea

Binomial name
- Vexillum cavea (Reeve, 1844)

Synonyms
- Mitra cavea Reeve, 1844 (original combination); Mitra porphyretica Reeve, L.A. 1844; Mitra satsumae Dall, W.H. 1926.; Vexillum (Pusia) cavea (Reeve, 1844) ·

= Vexillum cavea =

Species of gastropod

Vexillum cavea, common name the bird-cage mitre, is a species of small sea snail, marine gastropod mollusk in the family Costellariidae, the ribbed miters.

== Description ==
The length of the shell attains 21 mm.

(Original description) The ovate shell is smooth. It is longitudinally ribbed, ribs obtuse. Its colour is ashy black. The ribs ornamented with a row of small white spots. The columella is four-plaited.

== Distribution ==
This marine species occurs in the Indo-west and central Pacific; also off the Philippines and Australia (Queensland).
