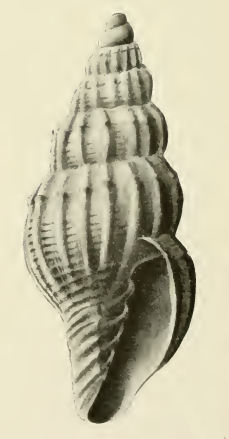
- Drawing of a shell of Vexillum acromiale (holotype)

Scientific classification
- Kingdom: Animalia
- Phylum: Mollusca
- Class: Gastropoda
- Subclass: Caenogastropoda
- Order: Neogastropoda
- Family: Costellariidae
- Genus: Vexillum
- Species: V. acromiale

Binomial name
- Vexillum acromiale (Hedley, 1915)

Synonyms
- Mitra acromialis Hedley, 1915 (original combination); Vexillum (Costellaria) acromiale (Hedley, 1915)

= Vexillum acromiale =

Species of gastropod

Vexillum acromiale is a species of small sea snail, marine gastropod mollusk in the family Costellariidae, the ribbed miters.

== Description ==
The length of the shell attains 11 mm; its diameter 4 mm.

(Original description) The ovate-fusiform shell is rather thin and light. Its colour is pale buff. The shell contains six whorls, including a smooth protoconch of 1½ whorl. The spire is gradate.

Sculpture : perpendicular ribs widely spaced, about seventeen on the body whorl, diminishing and alternating n ascent from whorl to whorl, knotted at the shoulder and fading at the base. The spirals occur as six prominent cords on the snout, above which a dozen threads become fainter as they ascend, traverse the interstices but not the ribs. About six of these ascend the spire. The aperture is pyriform. The outer lip is simple. The columella shows with four well developed, spaced, oblique plaits.

== Distribution ==
This marine species is endemic to Australia and occurs off New South Wales, Queensland, South Australia, Victoria, Western Australia).
