= Vexillum vangemerti =

Scientific classification
- Kingdom: Animalia
- Phylum: Mollusca
- Class: Gastropoda
- Subclass: Caenogastropoda
- Order: Neogastropoda
- Superfamily: Turbinelloidea
- Family: Costellariidae
- Genus: Vexillum
- Species: V. vangemerti

Binomial name
- Vexillum vangemerti Dekkers, 2014

Species of sea snail

Vexillum vangemerti is a species of sea snail, a marine gastropod mollusc in the family Costellariidae. This species is found off the coast of Vietnam.

== Description ==
Vexillum vangemerti is a medium to large-sized (for the genus), solid, fusiform sea snail within the Costellariidae family, also known as ribbed miters. Its shell can reach a length of 34-48 mm. The species exhibits a stepped spire and a protoconch that is typically missing its initial part in larger specimens. The remaining protoconch consists of a small, pointed, glassy, and uniformly brown section transitioning to cream-colored whorls. The teleoconch features 4 to 4.5 whorls, including the body whorl, with strong axial ribs that become broader and fewer in number towards the body whorl. The body whorl displays 7 to 8 broad axial ribs with a sharply angled periphery, which become faint near the outer lip. Impressions of broad, flattened spiral ribs with fine lines in between are visible, becoming coarser near the siphonal canal. The outer lip is simple, smooth, and slightly thickened. The parietal callus is moderately thick and often defined by a dark brown rim. It has four columellar plaits that decrease in size, with the first being the most prominent. Inside the aperture, there are 10 or more distinct, white lirae on the inner side of the outer lip, and the entire interior of the aperture is white. The mouth rim and siphonal canal are bordered by a dark brown glossy rim, sometimes interrupted by white on the lighter part of the body whorl. The shell color is typically cream with a single, very broad brown band that can extend to the siphonal canal.

== Distribution ==
This marine species occurs off Vietnam.
