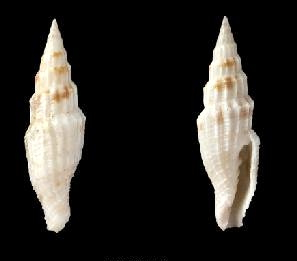
- Shell of Vexillum polygonum (specimen at the Natural History Museum, London)

Scientific classification
- Kingdom: Animalia
- Phylum: Mollusca
- Class: Gastropoda
- Subclass: Caenogastropoda
- Order: Neogastropoda
- Family: Costellariidae
- Genus: Vexillum
- Species: V. polygonum

Binomial name
- Vexillum polygonum (Gmelin, 1791)

Synonyms
- Costellaria marmorea (J.F. Gmelin, 1791); Costellaria similis (J.F. Gmelin, 1791); Mitra aurata Röding, 1798; Mitra marmorea Adams, A. 1853; Vexillum (Costellaria) polygonum (Gmelin, 1791); Voluta polygona Gmelin, 1791 (original combination)

= Vexillum polygonum =

Species of gastropod

Vexillum polygonum is a species of small sea snail, marine gastropod mollusk in the family Costellariidae, the ribbed miters.

== Description ==
The length of the shell attains 34 mm. Adult shells are slender and fusiform, ranging from about 20 to 40 mm in length. Each whorl bears 14–18 broad axial ribs crossed by fine spiral threads that create a low-noded, “quilted” sculpture. Background colour varies from ivory-cream to pinkish, over-lain by irregular chestnut-brown blotches that form polygonal patches—hence the specific epithet polygonum. The aperture is narrow; the columella displays four distinct plaits, the anterior two being strongest, and the inner lip is smooth.

== Distribution ==
This marine species occurs in the Indo-West Pacific (Madagascar, the Philippines, Solomon Islands, New Caledonia); also off Australia (Queensland).
