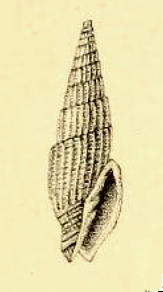
- Shell of Vexillum rajaensis (holotype)

Scientific classification
- Kingdom: Animalia
- Phylum: Mollusca
- Class: Gastropoda
- Subclass: Caenogastropoda
- Order: Neogastropoda
- Superfamily: Turbinelloidea
- Family: Costellariidae
- Genus: Vexillum
- Species: †V. rajaensis

Binomial name
- †Vexillum rajaensis (K. Martin, 1895)

Synonyms
- † Turricula (Callithea) rajaensis K. Martin, 1895

= Vexillum rajaensis =

Species of gastropod

Vexillum rajaensis is an extinct species of sea snail, a marine gastropod mollusk, in the family Costellariidae, the ribbed miters.

== Description ==
(Original description in German) The shell is turret-like (or tower-like), elongated, and furnished with a very sharp spire, on which there are ten median whorls; the embryonic end is missing.

The whorls are flatly arched (or slightly convex) and covered with a large number of sharply incised transverse ribs. In the spaces between these ribs, a system of very numerous, fine, and densely crowded spiral ridges appears.

These transverse ribs are weakly bent backward on the spire. On the anterior section of the body whorl, where they remain sharp up to the front, they turn sharply backward with a strong curve, corresponding to the strongly pronounced curvature with which the canal-like outlet (or siphonal canal) bends upwards. Due to this curvature, the shell appears constricted in the front.

The aperture is much shorter than half the shell's length and is oval. The slightly S-shaped columella possesses four folds, of which the last two are grooved and stand far apart from each other. The left lip is well-developed and gives rise to the formation of an indistinct umbilical chink.

== Distribution ==
Fossils of this marine species were found in Pliocene strata in Java, Indonesia.
