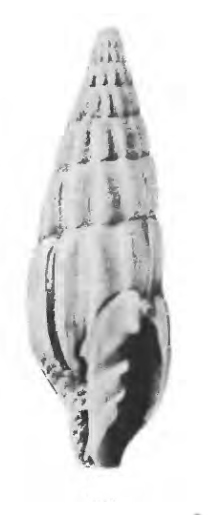
- Shell of Vexillum radius

Scientific classification
- Kingdom: Animalia
- Phylum: Mollusca
- Class: Gastropoda
- Subclass: Caenogastropoda
- Order: Neogastropoda
- Superfamily: Turbinelloidea
- Family: Costellariidae
- Genus: Vexillum
- Species: V. radius

Binomial name
- Vexillum radius (Reeve, 1845)

Synonyms
- Costellaria longispira (Reeve, 1845); Mitra (Turricula) radius Reeve, 1845 superseded combination; Mitra longispira Sowerby, G.B. (2nd) 1874; Mitra radius Reeve, 1845 (original combination); Vexillum (Costellaria) radius (Reeve, 1845) ·

= Vexillum radius =

Species of gastropod

Vexillum radius, common name the shuttle mitre, is a species of small sea snail, marine gastropod mollusk in the family Costellariidae, the ribbed miters.

== Description ==
The length of the shell attains 19.8 mm.

(Original description) The shell is slenderly fusiform. The spire is acuminated. The base is contracted and somewhat elongated. The whorls are longitudinally concentrically plicately ribbed. The interstices are cancellated. The shell has a pale flesh-colour. The body whorl is encircled towards the base with a pale brown band. The columella is two-plaited.

== Distribution ==
This marine species occurs in the Indo-West and South Pacific: off Mozambique, the Philippines, the Solomon Islands, Fiji and Papua New Guinea; also off New Zealand and Australia (Queensland).
