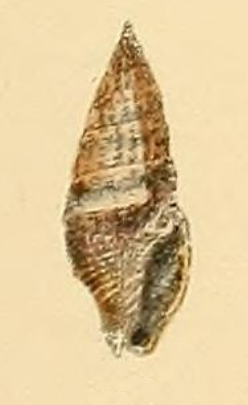
- Shell of Vexillum semisculptum (holotype)

Scientific classification
- Kingdom: Animalia
- Phylum: Mollusca
- Class: Gastropoda
- Subclass: Caenogastropoda
- Order: Neogastropoda
- Superfamily: Turbinelloidea
- Family: Costellariidae
- Genus: Vexillum
- Species: V. semisculptum

Binomial name
- Vexillum semisculptum (Adams & Reeve, 1850)

Synonyms
- Mitra semisculpta A. Adams & Reeve, 1850 superseded combination; Pusia semisculptum (A. Adams & Reeve, 1850); Vexillum (Pusia) semisculptum (A. Adams & Reeve, 1850)

= Vexillum semisculptum =

Species of gastropod

Vexillum semisculptum is a species of small sea snail, marine gastropod mollusk in the family Costellariidae, the ribbed miters.

== Description ==
The length of the shell attains 14 mm.

(original description) The shell has an oblong-fusiform shape, with a sharp, brown apex. The shell contains twelve whorls. The penultimate whorl and the body whorl are smooth, whilst the rest are highly sculptured The whorls are longitudinally ribbed. Their interstices are clathrate. The columella is three- to four-plaited. The aperture is narrow. The outer lip is simple. The shell is of a lead-colour, darkly painted with fine rusty wavy lines and with a pale single band at the body whorl.

== Distribution ==
This marine species occurs off the Philippines; also off the Solomon Islands and Papua New Guinea.
