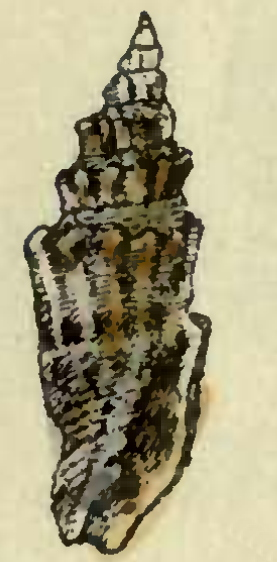
- Shell of Vexillum dohrni

Scientific classification
- Kingdom: Animalia
- Phylum: Mollusca
- Class: Gastropoda
- Subclass: Caenogastropoda
- Order: Neogastropoda
- Superfamily: Turbinelloidea
- Family: Costellariidae
- Genus: Vexillum
- Species: V. dohrni

Binomial name
- Vexillum dohrni (A. Adams, 1864)

Synonyms
- Costellaria dohrni A. Adams, 1864 superseded combination; Vexillum (Costellaria) dohrni (A. Adams, 1864) superseded combination

= Vexillum dohrni =

Species of gastropod

Vexillum dohrni is a species of small sea snail, marine gastropod mollusk in the family Costellariidae, the ribbed miters.

== Description ==
The length of the shell attains 18.7 mm.

(Original description) The turreted shell has a fusiform, shape. It is gray, irregularly spotted with rufous and variegated. The spire has a long aperture. The shell contains 9 whorls. These are flat and longitudinally ribbed with distant ribs, posteriorly making a series of knots. The spiral lines cut deeply into the interstices of the longitudinal ribs. The aperture is narrow, lined with five oblique folds. The outer lip is folded inside near the left edge.

== Distribution ==
This marine species occurs off Japan.
