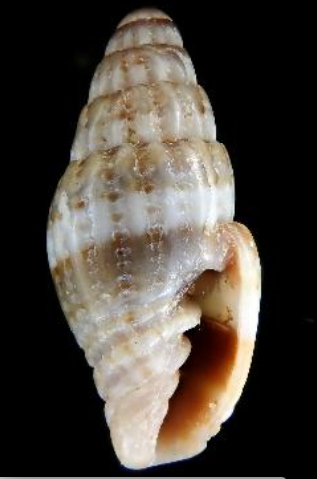
- Shell of Vexillum daedalum

Scientific classification
- Kingdom: Animalia
- Phylum: Mollusca
- Class: Gastropoda
- Subclass: Caenogastropoda
- Order: Neogastropoda
- Superfamily: Turbinelloidea
- Family: Costellariidae
- Genus: Vexillum
- Species: V. daedalum

Binomial name
- Vexillum daedalum (Reeve, 1845)

Synonyms
- Mitra daedala Reeve, 1845; Vexillum (Costellaria) daedalum (Reeve, 1845) ·

= Vexillum daedalum =

Species of gastropod

Vexillum daedalum, common name the costellate mitre shell, is a species of small sea snail, marine gastropod mollusk in the family Costellariidae, the ribbed miters.

== Description ==
The shell size varies between 9 mm and 30 mm.

(original description) The shell is somewhat fusiformly ovate. The spire is turreted. The shell is longitudinally ribbed, interstices between the ribs strongly latticed. The shell is ashy green, encircled with a conspicuous white zone. The columella is four-plaited.

== Distribution ==
This species occurs in the Indian Ocean off Mozambique and in the Western and Central Pacific Ocean off Fiji; also off Papua New Guinea and Australia (Northern Territory, Queensland).
