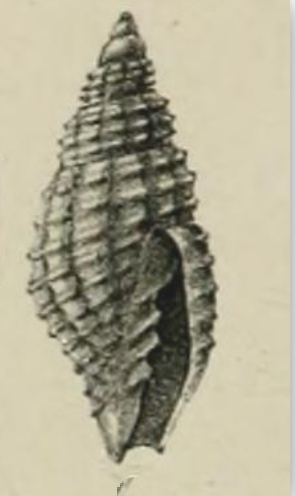
- Image of a shell of Vexillum innotabile (holotype)

Scientific classification
- Kingdom: Animalia
- Phylum: Mollusca
- Class: Gastropoda
- Subclass: Caenogastropoda
- Order: Neogastropoda
- Superfamily: Turbinelloidea
- Family: Costellariidae
- Genus: Vexillum
- Species: V. innotabile

Binomial name
- Vexillum innotabile (E. A. Smith, 1890)

Synonyms
- Mitra (Turricula) innotabilis E. A. Smith, 1890 (basionym); Turricula innotabilis E.A. Smith, 1890; Vexillum (Costellaria) innotabile (E. A. Smith, 1890) ·

= Vexillum innotabile =

Species of sea snail

Vexillum innotabile is a species of small sea snail, marine gastropod mollusk in the family Costellariidae, the ribbed miters.

== Description ==
The length of the shell attains 7 mm, its diameter 2.5 mm.

The cancellation is coarse for so small a shell. The six convex whorls (the protoconch is large) have a slightly turreted appearance, being divided by a deep suture. The white liration is the third from the top of the whorls. The aperture is narrow and measures about half the length of the shell. The columella has three plaits. The outer lip is narrow.

== Distribution ==
This species occurs in the Atlantic Ocean off Saint Helena.
