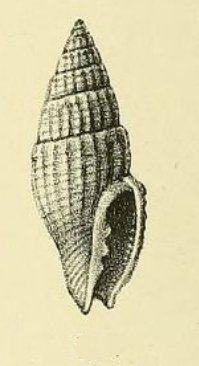
- Drawing of a shell of Vexillum pasitheum (holotype)

Scientific classification
- Kingdom: Animalia
- Phylum: Mollusca
- Class: Gastropoda
- Subclass: Caenogastropoda
- Order: Neogastropoda
- Family: Costellariidae
- Genus: Vexillum
- Species: V. pasitheum

Binomial name
- Vexillum pasitheum (Melvill & Standen, 1901)

Synonyms
- Mitra (Costellaria) pasithea Melvill & Standen, 1901 · unaccepted (basionym); Mitra pasithea Melvill & Standen, 1901 (original combination); Vexillum (Costellaria) pasitheum (Melvill & Standen, 1901)

= Vexillum pasitheum =

Species of gastropod

Vexillum pasitheum is a species of small sea snail, marine gastropod mollusk in the family Costellariidae, the ribbed miters.

== Description ==
The length of the shell attains 9.5 mm, its diameter 4 mm.

The species is distinguished by its conspicuously shouldered whorls. The fusiform shell contains eight whorls, of which two in the protoconch. The shell is uniformly closely longitudinally oblique-ribbed, these ribs being crossed by many regular spiral sulci, which give them a beaded appearance. The aperture is oblong. The outer lip is crenulated. The columella contains three plaits. The short siphonal canal is slightly recurved. The surface is pure white, with the exception of a dorsal ochreous band on the lower portion of the body whorl.

== Distribution ==
This marine species occurs off Réunion and the Gulf of Oman.
