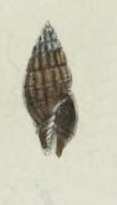
- Original image of a shell of Vexillum aemula

Scientific classification
- Kingdom: Animalia
- Phylum: Mollusca
- Class: Gastropoda
- Subclass: Caenogastropoda
- Order: Neogastropoda
- Family: Costellariidae
- Genus: Vexillum
- Species: V. aemula

Binomial name
- Vexillum aemula (E. A. Smith, 1879)

Synonyms
- Mitra (Pusia) aemula E. A. Smith, 1879 (basionym); Mitra aemula E. A. Smith, 1879 (original combination); Vexillum (Pusia) aemula (E. A. Smith, 1879)

= Vexillum aemula =

Species of gastropod

Vexillum aemula is a species of small sea snail, marine gastropod mollusk in the family Costellariidae, the ribbed miters.

== Description ==
The length of the shell attains 12 mm, its diameter 4 mm; the length of the aperture 5 mm.

(Original description) The fusiformly ovate, shell is blackish brown, with a narrow yellow line round the middle of the whorls, and yellow at the upper margin, and a second line on the body whorl rather below the middle. It is clothed with an olive epidermis obscuring the colouring. The shell consists of eight whorls, slightly convex, with stoutish longitudinal ribs, about fourteen in number on tha penultimate whorl, attenuated and obsolete just before the five oblique stoutish spiral cords encircling the tail.The sutures are smooth, about as broad as the ribs. The aperture is small, dark brown, with two yellow transverse lines, lirate far within. The columella is armed with four plaits and a slight callus at the upper extremity.

== Distribution ==
This marine species occurs in the East China Sea and off Japan.
