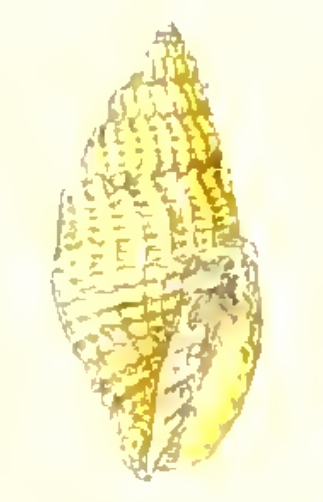
- Image of Vexillum croceum (holotype)

Scientific classification
- Kingdom: Animalia
- Phylum: Mollusca
- Class: Gastropoda
- Subclass: Caenogastropoda
- Order: Neogastropoda
- Superfamily: Turbinelloidea
- Family: Costellariidae
- Genus: Vexillum
- Species: V. croceum

Binomial name
- Vexillum croceum (Reeve, 1845)

Synonyms
- Mitra crocea Reeve, 1845 (original combination); Vexillum (Pusia) croceum (Reeve, 1845)

= Vexillum croceum =

Species of gastropod

Vexillum croceum, common name the yellow mitre, is a species of small sea snail, marine gastropod mollusk in the family Costellariidae, the ribbed miters.

== Description ==
The length of the shell attains 12.8 mm.

(Original description) The shell is ovate. The sutures of the spire are impressed. The whorls are flatly angulated at the upper part, longitudinally closely ribbed and transversely grooved towards the base. The shell is pale yellow, the interior of the aperture is stained with orange. The columella is four-plaited.

== Distribution ==
This marine species occurs off the Marshall islands.
