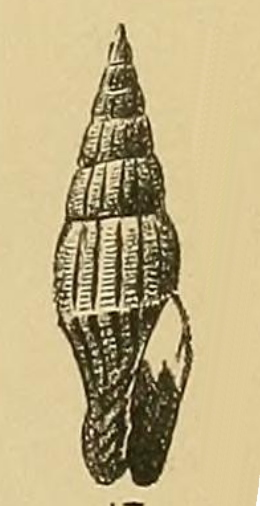
- Drawing of a shell of Vexillum sybillae (holotype)

Scientific classification
- Kingdom: Animalia
- Phylum: Mollusca
- Class: Gastropoda
- Subclass: Caenogastropoda
- Order: Neogastropoda
- Superfamily: Turbinelloidea
- Family: Costellariidae
- Genus: Vexillum
- Species: V. sybillae

Binomial name
- Vexillum sybillae (Melvill, 1888)

Synonyms
- Mitra sybillae Melvill, 1888 (original designation); Vexillum (Costellaria) sybillae (Melvill, 1888)

= Vexillum sybillae =

Species of gastropod

Vexillum sybillae is a species of small sea snail, marine gastropod mollusk in the family Costellariidae, the ribbed miters.

== Description ==
The length of the shell attains 16 mm, its diameter 5 mm.

(Original description) The shell is lanceolate with a turreted spire. The whorls are longitudinally costoso-plicate. The narrow ribs are compressed. The interstices are conspicuously and deeply striate. The shell is ashy white, below bluish lead colour, the apex being tinged with the same colour. The columella is five-plaited.

== Distribution ==
This marine species occurs off the Andaman Islands.
