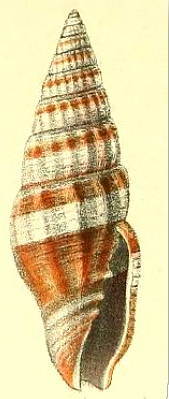
- Shell of Vexillum caliendrum (holotype)

Scientific classification
- Kingdom: Animalia
- Phylum: Mollusca
- Class: Gastropoda
- Subclass: Caenogastropoda
- Order: Neogastropoda
- Family: Costellariidae
- Genus: Vexillum
- Species: V. caliendrum

Binomial name
- Vexillum caliendrum (Melvill & Standen, 1901)

Synonyms
- Costellaria caliendrum J.C. Melvill & R. Standen, 1901; Mitra (Turricula) caliendrum Melvill & Standen, 1901 (basionym); Mitra caliendrum Melvill & Standen, 1901 (original combination); Vexillum (Costellaria) caliendrum (Melvill & Standen, 1901)

= Vexillum caliendrum =

Species of gastropod

Vexillum caliendrum is a species of small sea snail, marine gastropod mollusk in the family Costellariidae, the ribbed miters.

== Description ==
The length of the shell attains 24.5 mm, its diameter 8 mm.

The solid, fusiform shell is brown and narrowly white-banded spirally. The shell consists of 10-12 whorls. It is furnished with many oblique ribs on the upper whorls, about eleven on the body whorl. The narrow aperture is squarely oblong, lilac within. The outer lip is thickened and crenulate. The recurved columella is four times plaited.

== Distribution ==
This marine species occurs in the Persian Gulf and the Gulf of Oman.
