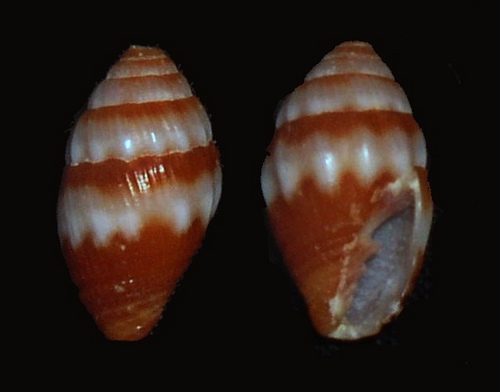
- Vexillum (Pusia) leucodesma

Scientific classification
- Kingdom: Animalia
- Phylum: Mollusca
- Class: Gastropoda
- Subclass: Caenogastropoda
- Order: Neogastropoda
- Superfamily: Turbinelloidea
- Family: Costellariidae
- Genus: Vexillum
- Species: V. leucodesma

Binomial name
- Vexillum leucodesma (Reeve, 1845)

Synonyms
- Mitra leucodesma Reeve, 1845; Vexillum (Pusia) leucodesma (Reeve, 1845); Vexillum leucodesmum (Reeve, 1845) (misspelling)

= Vexillum leucodesma =

Species of gastropod

Vexillum leucodesma is a species of small sea snail, marine gastropod mollusk in the family Costellariidae, the ribbed miters.

== Description ==
The shell size varies between 11 mm and 20 mm.

== Distribution ==
This species is distributed in the Indo-West Pacific and the Philippines; also off Australia (Northern Territory, Queensland, Western Australia).
