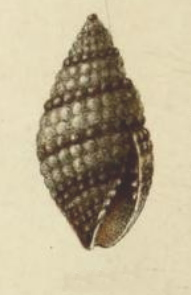
- Shell of Vexillum sanctaehelenae (holotype)

Scientific classification
- Kingdom: Animalia
- Phylum: Mollusca
- Class: Gastropoda
- Subclass: Caenogastropoda
- Order: Neogastropoda
- Superfamily: Turbinelloidea
- Family: Costellariidae
- Genus: Vexillum
- Species: V. sanctaehelenae

Binomial name
- Vexillum sanctaehelenae (E. A. Smith, 1890)

Synonyms
- Mitra (Pusia) sanctaehelenae E. A. Smith, 1890; Vexillum (Pusia) sanctaehelenae (E. A. Smith, 1890)

= Vexillum sanctaehelenae =

Species of gastropod

Vexillum sanctaehelenae is a species of sea snail, a marine gastropod mollusk, in the family Costellariidae, the ribbed miters.

== Description ==
The length of the shell attains 5 mm, its diameter 2.5 mm.

This small species has an ovate shape. It is white with black spots between the nodules. The shell contains five whorls. The first are smooth and globose. The rest are slightly convex with a shallow suture between them. The sixteen granulose ribs are slightly oblique. The aperture measures half the total length. The outer lip is slightly incrassate, its interior denticulate. The columella is three-plaited. The shell is remarkable for its small size, the minutely beaded ribs, the dark apex, and the style of coloration.

== Distribution ==
This marine species occurs in the Atlantic Ocean off Saint Helena.
