= Vexillum menehune =

Scientific classification
- Kingdom: Animalia
- Phylum: Mollusca
- Class: Gastropoda
- Subclass: Caenogastropoda
- Order: Neogastropoda
- Superfamily: Turbinelloidea
- Family: Costellariidae
- Genus: Vexillum
- Species: V. menehune

Binomial name
- Vexillum menehune Salisbury, 2011

Synonyms
- Vexillum (Costellaria) menehune Salisbury, 2011

Species of gastropod

Vexillum menehune is a species of sea snail, a marine gastropod mollusk, in the family Costellariidae, the ribbed miters.

== Description ==
The length of the shell attains 7 mm.

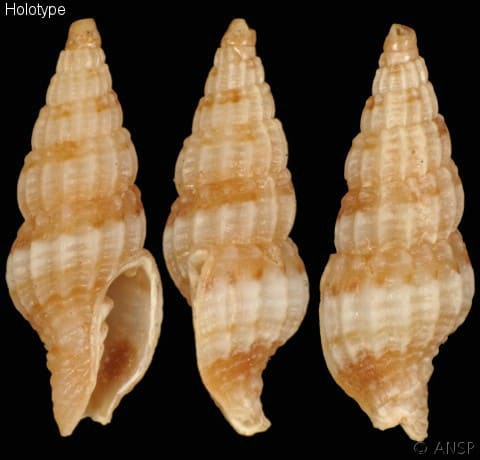
Vexillum Menehune's shell (Same shell at different angles)

== Distribution ==
This marine species occurs off Pokai Bay, O'ahu, Hawaii.
