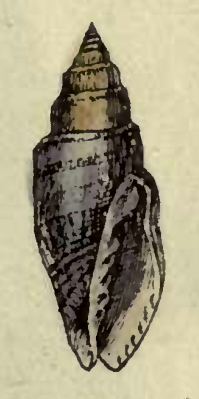
- Drawing of a shell of Vexillum callosum

Scientific classification
- Kingdom: Animalia
- Phylum: Mollusca
- Class: Gastropoda
- Subclass: Caenogastropoda
- Order: Neogastropoda
- Superfamily: Turbinelloidea
- Family: Costellariidae
- Genus: Vexillum
- Species: V. callosum

Binomial name
- Vexillum callosum (Reeve, 1845)

Synonyms
- Mitra callosa Reeve, 1845; Vexillum (Costellaria) callosum (Reeve, 1845)

= Vexillum callosum =

Species of gastropod

Vexillum callosum, common name the callous mitre, is a species of small sea snail, marine gastropod mollusk in the family Costellariidae, the ribbed miters.

== Description ==
The length of the shell attains 22.89 mm.

(Original description) The shell is oblong-ovate. The spire is rather short. The sutures are somewhat impressed. The shell is smooth, ridged towards the base. Its colour is leaden brown, variegated here and there with brown dots. The brown columella is five-plaited, armed at the upper part with a white callosity. The plaits are white. The outer lip is slightly flexuous.

The shell is smooth, striate towards the base. It is leaden brown, variegated, spotted or obscurely banded with brown.

== Distribution ==
This marine species occurs off the Philippines.
