= Vexillum tankervillei =

Scientific classification
- Kingdom: Animalia
- Phylum: Mollusca
- Class: Gastropoda
- Subclass: Caenogastropoda
- Order: Neogastropoda
- Superfamily: Turbinelloidea
- Family: Costellariidae
- Genus: Vexillum
- Species: V. tankervillei

Binomial name
- Vexillum tankervillei (Melvill, 1888)

Synonyms
- Mitra (Costellaria) tankervillei Melvill, 1888; Mitra rugosa G. B. Sowerby I, 1825 (secondary homonym of Voluta rugosa Gmelin, 1791; Mitra tankervillei Melvill, 1888 is a replacement name); Mitra tankervillei Melvill, 1888 (nomen novum for Mitra rugosa G. B. Sowerby I, 1825; non Voluta rugosa Gmelin, 1791)

Species of gastropod

Vexillum tankervillei is a species of small sea snail, marine gastropod mollusk in the family Costellariidae, the ribbed miters. It is found in the Indian Ocean.

== Description ==
The length of the shell attains 27.9 mm.

(Original description) The shell is subfusiform, perforated and turreted. The shell is rendered very rough with numerous decussated grooves, which are decussated at nearly equal distances. The interstices resemble excavated hollows, and make the elevated parts granulated. The whorls are obtusely angulated. The body whorl is contracted in the middle. The aperture is striated. The outer lip is crenated The base is slightly recurved. The columella is five-plaited.

The color of the shell is slightly clouded with brown.

== Distribution ==
The species is found in the Indian Ocean.
