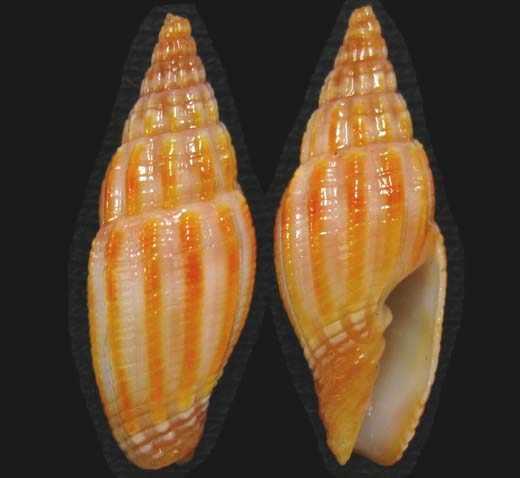
- Shell of Vexillum vezzarochristophei

Scientific classification
- Kingdom: Animalia
- Phylum: Mollusca
- Class: Gastropoda
- Subclass: Caenogastropoda
- Order: Neogastropoda
- Superfamily: Turbinelloidea
- Family: Costellariidae
- Genus: Vexillum
- Species: V. vezzarochristophei

Binomial name
- Vexillum vezzarochristophei Cossignani, 2018

= Vexillum vezzarochristophei =

Species of gastropod

Vexillum vezzarochristophei is a species of sea snail, a marine gastropod mollusk, in the family Costellariidae, the ribbed miters.

== Distribution ==
This marine species occurs off the Philippines.
