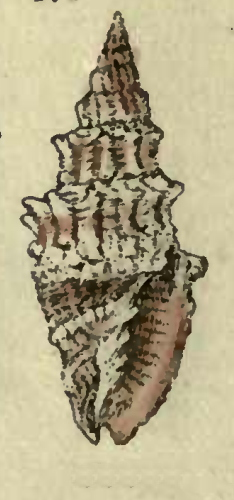
- Drawing of a shell of Vexillum echinatum

Scientific classification
- Kingdom: Animalia
- Phylum: Mollusca
- Class: Gastropoda
- Subclass: Caenogastropoda
- Order: Neogastropoda
- Superfamily: Turbinelloidea
- Family: Costellariidae
- Genus: Vexillum
- Species: V. echinatum

Binomial name
- Vexillum echinatum (A. Adams, 1853)

Synonyms
- Costellaria fusiformis L.A. Reeve, 1844; Mitra echinata A. Adams, 1853 (original combination); Mitra mucronata Reeve, 1844 (nomen dubium); Tiara mucronata Broderip, 1836; Turricula echinata 'A. Adams, 1853); Vexillum (Costellaria) echinatum (A. Adams, 1853) ·

= Vexillum echinatum =

Species of gastropod

Vexillum echinatum is a species of small sea snail, marine gastropod mollusk in the family Costellariidae, the ribbed miters.

== Description ==
The length of the shell varies between 16 mm and 28 mm.

== Distribution ==
Red Sea; Tropical Indo-Pacific to Polynesia; also off the Philippines.
