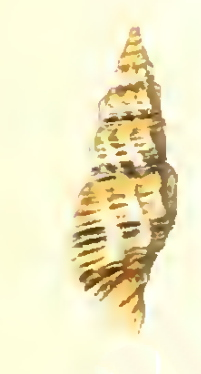
- Drawing of a shell of Vexillum decorum

Scientific classification
- Kingdom: Animalia
- Phylum: Mollusca
- Class: Gastropoda
- Subclass: Caenogastropoda
- Order: Neogastropoda
- Superfamily: Turbinelloidea
- Family: Costellariidae
- Genus: Vexillum
- Species: V. decorum

Binomial name
- Vexillum decorum (Reeve, 1845)

Synonyms
- Mitra decora Reeve, 1845; Vexillum (Costellaria) decorum (Reeve, 1845)

= Vexillum decorum =

Species of gastropod

Vexillum decorum, common name the graceful mitre, is a species of sea snail, a marine gastropod mollusk, in the family Costellariidae, the ribbed miters.

== Description ==
The length of the shell attains 19.3 mm.

(Original description) The shell is somewhat fusiform and contracted at the base. The spire is acuminately turreted. The sutures are deep. The shell is transversely impressly striated. The intermediate ridges are granulous, ornamented longitudinally with narrow rather distant concentric folds. The shell is white, encircled with an orange brown belt, the body whorl with two. The columella is four-plaited, umbilicated, slightly canalieulated.

== Distribution ==
This marine species occurs off the Philippines.
