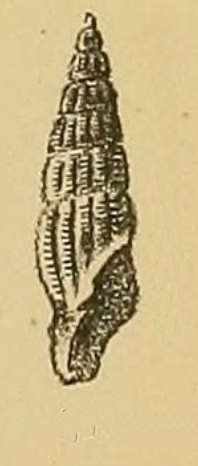
- Drawing of a shell of Vexillum percnodictya (holotype)

Scientific classification
- Kingdom: Animalia
- Phylum: Mollusca
- Class: Gastropoda
- Subclass: Caenogastropoda
- Order: Neogastropoda
- Superfamily: Turbinelloidea
- Family: Costellariidae
- Genus: Vexillum
- Species: V. percnodictya

Binomial name
- Vexillum percnodictya (Melvill, 1888)

Synonyms
- Mitra cerithina Melvill, 1888; Mitra percnodictya Melvill, 1888; Vexillum (Costellaria) percnodictyum (Melvill, 1888)

= Vexillum percnodictya =

Species of gastropod

Vexillum percnodictya is a species of sea snail, a marine gastropod mollusk, in the family Costellariidae, the ribbed miters.

== Description ==
The length of the shell attains 21.5 mm, its diameter 4 mm.

(Original description) The narrow, dusky-brown shell is fusiform and turreted. It is many ribbed with smooth ribs. The interstices are deeply cancellated. The columella is three-plaited.

== Distribution ==
This marine species occurs off Madagascar, Andaman Islands and Australia.
