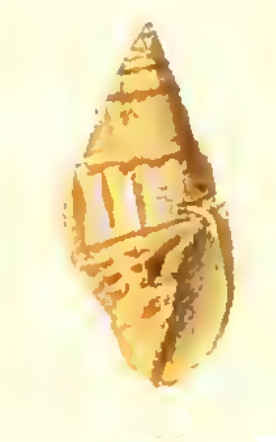
- Shell of Vexillum lotum (holotype)

Scientific classification
- Kingdom: Animalia
- Phylum: Mollusca
- Class: Gastropoda
- Subclass: Caenogastropoda
- Order: Neogastropoda
- Superfamily: Turbinelloidea
- Family: Costellariidae
- Genus: Vexillum
- Species: V. lotum

Binomial name
- Vexillum lotum (Reeve, 1845)

Synonyms
- Mitra lota Reeve, 1845 (original combination); Vexillum (Pusia) lotum (Reeve, 1845) ·

= Vexillum lotum =

Species of gastropod

Vexillum lotum, common name the washed mitre, are a species of small sea snail, marine gastropod mollusk in the family Costellariidae, the ribbed miters.

== Description ==
(Original description) The shell is oblong-ovate. The sutures of the spire are impressed, transversely very finely impressly striated, longitudinally concentrically ribbed. The ribs are granose towards the base. The shell is pale reddish orange, variegated with greenish brown. The columella is three-plaited.

== Distribution ==
This marine species occurs off the Philippines.
