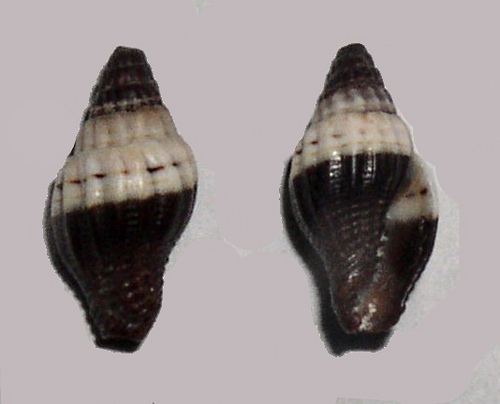
- Vexillum sinuosum

Scientific classification
- Kingdom: Animalia
- Phylum: Mollusca
- Class: Gastropoda
- Subclass: Caenogastropoda
- Order: Neogastropoda
- Family: Costellariidae
- Genus: Vexillum
- Species: V. sinuosum

Binomial name
- Vexillum sinuosum Turner, 2008

Synonyms
- Pusia sinuosum Turner, 2008; Vexillum (Pusia) sinuosum Turner, 2008

= Vexillum sinuosum =

Species of gastropod

Vexillum sinuosum is a species of small sea snail, marine gastropod mollusk in the family Costellariidae, the ribbed miters.

== Description ==
The length of the shell attains 5.2 cm.

== Distribution ==
This species occurs in the seas along Northwest Australia.
