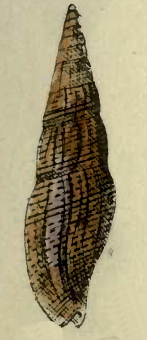
- Drawing of a shell of Vexillum japonicum

Scientific classification
- Kingdom: Animalia
- Phylum: Mollusca
- Class: Gastropoda
- Subclass: Caenogastropoda
- Order: Neogastropoda
- Superfamily: Turbinelloidea
- Family: Costellariidae
- Genus: Vexillum
- Species: V. japonicum

Binomial name
- Vexillum japonicum A. Adams, 1864

Synonyms
- Costellaria japonica (A. Adams, 1864); Mitra japonica A. Adams, 1864; Mitropifex hirasei Kira, 1962; Vexillum (Costellaria) japonicum (A. Adams, 1864); Vexillum hirasei (Kira, 1962)

= Vexillum japonicum =

Species of gastropod

Vexillum japonicum is a species of sea snail, a marine gastropod mollusk, in the family Costellariidae, the ribbed miters.

== Description ==
The length of the shell attains 44 mm. The turreted fusiform shell is dingy white, stained and mottled with rufous spots. The spire is longer than the aperture. The shell contains nine convex whorls. The decussation of the small longitudinal ribs and transverse lirae give this species a granular surface. The aperture is narrow.

== Distribution ==
This marine species occurs in the Sea of Japan.
