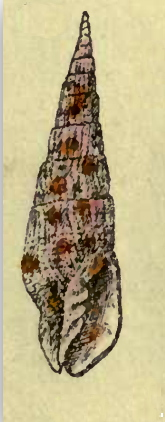
- Drawing of a shell of Vexillum macrospira

Scientific classification
- Kingdom: Animalia
- Phylum: Mollusca
- Class: Gastropoda
- Subclass: Caenogastropoda
- Order: Neogastropoda
- Superfamily: Turbinelloidea
- Family: Costellariidae
- Genus: Vexillum
- Species: V. macrospira

Binomial name
- Vexillum macrospira (A. Adams, 1853)

Synonyms
- Mitra macrospira A. Adams, 1853 superseded combination; Vexillum macrospirum (A. Adams, 1853)

= Vexillum macrospira =

Species of gastropod

Vexillum macrospira is a species of sea snail, a marine gastropod mollusk, in the family Costellariidae, the ribbed miters.

== Description ==
The length of the shell attains 33 mm.

A whitish, pyramidal-turreted species with a produced acuminate spire. It is ornated with irregular rows of chestnut spots. The whorls are slightly convex with longitudinal smooth ribs. The short aperture has a narrowed base. The outer lip is dilated anteriorly. The columella is five-plaited.

The shell is whitish or yellowish, with rows of chestnut spots.

== Distribution ==
This marine species occurs off India.
