= Vexillum utravis =

Scientific classification
- Kingdom: Animalia
- Phylum: Mollusca
- Class: Gastropoda
- Subclass: Caenogastropoda
- Order: Neogastropoda
- Superfamily: Turbinelloidea
- Family: Costellariidae
- Genus: Vexillum
- Species: V. utravis

Binomial name
- Vexillum utravis (Melvill, 1925)

Synonyms
- Mitra (Vulpecula) utravis Melvill, 1925 ·

Species of gastropod

Vexillum utravis is a species of small sea snail, marine gastropod mollusk within the family Costellariidae, the ribbed miters.

== Description ==
The length of the shell attains 30 mm, its diameter 10 mm.

The biconical-fusiform shell is somewhat shining. It is dark chestnut brown. The shell contains eight whorls, all, excepting the protoconch, very closely longitudinally ribbed. But these are evanescent on the dorsal surface of the body whorl, which is therefore quite plain and smooth. The upper whorls are spirally once white banded just above the sutures, the body whorl possesses two such bands, one at the periphery, the other halfway between it and the base, this being narrower, and not so distinct. The ribs are sharp, and clearly defined, slightly flexuous, suturally innpressed, the interstices closely sulcate. The aperture is pale grey. The outer lip is only slightly thickened. The columellar margin is four-plicate. The siphonal canal is recurved basally.

== Distribution ==
This marine species occurs off the Philippines.
