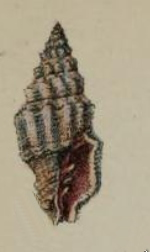
- Drawing of a shell of Vexillum appelii

Scientific classification
- Kingdom: Animalia
- Phylum: Mollusca
- Class: Gastropoda
- Subclass: Caenogastropoda
- Order: Neogastropoda
- Superfamily: Turbinelloidea
- Family: Costellariidae
- Genus: Vexillum
- Species: V. appelii

Binomial name
- Vexillum appelii (Jickeli, 1874)

Synonyms
- Costellaria macandreae A.H. Cooke, 1885; Turricula (Costellaria) appelii Jickeli, 1874 (basionym); Turricula (Costellaria) pharaonis H. Adams, 1872 (invalid: junior secondary homonym of Mitra pharaonis Issel, 1869; Turricula appelii and T. macandreae are replacement names); Turricula macandreae A. H. Cooke, 1885 ·; Vexillum (Costellaria) appelii (Jickeli, 1874)

= Vexillum appelii =

Species of gastropod

Vexillum appelii is a species of small sea snail, marine gastropod mollusk in the family Costellariidae, the ribbed miters.

== Description ==
The length of the shell attains 26.5 mm; its diameter is 10 mm.

== Distribution ==
This species occurs in the Red Sea.
