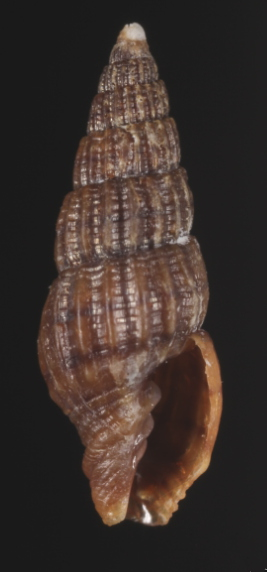
- Shell of Vexillum rolani (holotype at MNHN, Paris)

Scientific classification
- Kingdom: Animalia
- Phylum: Mollusca
- Class: Gastropoda
- Subclass: Caenogastropoda
- Order: Neogastropoda
- Superfamily: Turbinelloidea
- Family: Costellariidae
- Genus: Vexillum
- Species: V. rolani

Binomial name
- Vexillum rolani Gori, Rosado & R. Salisbury, 2019

= Vexillum rolani =

Species of gastropod

Vexillum rolani is a species of small sea snail, marine gastropod mollusk in the family Costellariidae, the ribbed miters.

== Description ==
The length of the shell attains 8.7 mm.

== Distribution ==
This marine species occurs off Oman.
