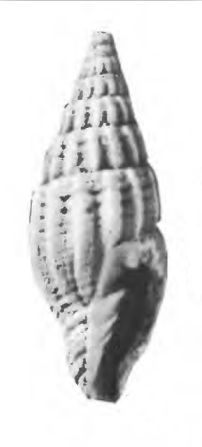
- Shell of Vexillum gembacanum

Scientific classification
- Kingdom: Animalia
- Phylum: Mollusca
- Class: Gastropoda
- Subclass: Caenogastropoda
- Order: Neogastropoda
- Superfamily: Turbinelloidea
- Family: Costellariidae
- Genus: Vexillum
- Species: †V. gembacanum

Binomial name
- †Vexillum gembacanum (K. Martin, 1884)

Synonyms
- † Mitra (Turricula) gembacana K. Martin, 1884 ·

= Vexillum gembacanum =

Species of gastropod

Vexillum gembacanum is an extinct species of sea snail, a marine gastropod mollusk, in the family Costellariidae, the ribbed miters.

== Description ==
The length of the shell attains 7.9 mm (0.31 in), its diameter 3 mm (0.12 in).

== Distribution ==
Fossils of this marine species were found in Java and in late Miocene strata in Eniwetok, Marshall Islands.
