= Vexillum puerile =

Scientific classification
- Kingdom: Animalia
- Phylum: Mollusca
- Class: Gastropoda
- Subclass: Caenogastropoda
- Order: Neogastropoda
- Superfamily: Turbinelloidea
- Family: Costellariidae
- Genus: Vexillum
- Species: V. puerile

Binomial name
- Vexillum puerile (Cooke, 1885)

Synonyms
- Mitra puerilis A. H. Cooke, 1885 (original combination); Vexillum (Costellaria) puerile (A. H. Cooke, 1885)

Species of gastropod

Vexillum puerile is a species of small sea snail, marine gastropod mollusk in the family Costellariidae, the ribbed miters.

== Description ==
The length of the shell attains 4.9 mm.

The small shell is somewhat elongated. The spire is turreted, but not sharply. The suture is deepish. The shell is strongly angled beneath the suture and longitudinally strongly ribbed. There are ten ribs on the body whorl. These are rounded and crossed by well-marked rather distant transverse lines which are coloured on the top of the ribs. The colour is light flesh-tinted which (in fresh specimens) a deeper broad band on the lower half of the body whorl. The columella is four-plaited.

== Distribution ==
This species occurs in the Red Sea.
