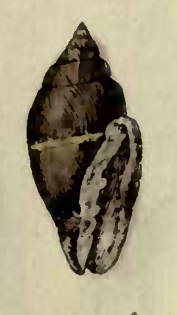
- Drawing of a shell of Vexillum chelonia

Scientific classification
- Kingdom: Animalia
- Phylum: Mollusca
- Class: Gastropoda
- Subclass: Caenogastropoda
- Order: Neogastropoda
- Superfamily: Turbinelloidea
- Family: Costellariidae
- Genus: Vexillum
- Species: V. chelonia

Binomial name
- Vexillum chelonia (Reeve, 1845)

Synonyms
- Mitra chelonia Reeve, 1845 · unaccepted (original combination); Vexillum (Pusia) chelonia (Reeve, 1845) ·; Vexillum sculptispira G.B. III Sowerby, 1913

= Vexillum chelonia =

Species of gastropod

Vexillum chelonia is a species of small sea snail, marine gastropod mollusk in the family Costellariidae, the ribbed miters.

== Distribution ==
This marine species occurs off the Philippines.
