= Vexillum stossieri =

Scientific classification
- Kingdom: Animalia
- Phylum: Mollusca
- Class: Gastropoda
- Subclass: Caenogastropoda
- Order: Neogastropoda
- Superfamily: Turbinelloidea
- Family: Costellariidae
- Genus: Vexillum
- Species: V. stossieri

Binomial name
- Vexillum stossieri Turner & Marrow, 2001

Synonyms
- Vexillum (Costellaria) stossieri H. Turner & Marrow, 2001

Species of gastropod

Vexillum stossieri is a species of small sea snail, marine gastropod mollusk in the family Costellariidae, the ribbed miters.

== Description ==
The shell has been recorded at lengths between 15 and 28 mm and has 9 to 10 whorls, each ribbed, with 13 ribs on the first and 19 on the penultimate whorl. The aperture is 39-41% of the shell length and the columella has four folds. The shell is reddish-brown with lighter spiral bands. The interior is white.

== Distribution ==
The species occurs off the coast of South Africa and Mozambique.
