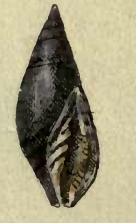
- Drawing of a shell of Vexillum anthracinum

Scientific classification
- Kingdom: Animalia
- Phylum: Mollusca
- Class: Gastropoda
- Subclass: Caenogastropoda
- Order: Neogastropoda
- Superfamily: Turbinelloidea
- Family: Costellariidae
- Genus: Vexillum
- Species: V. anthracinum

Binomial name
- Vexillum anthracinum (Reeve, 1844)

Synonyms
- Mitra anthracina Reeve, 1844; Zierliana anthracina (Reeve, 1844)

= Vexillum anthracinum =

Species of gastropod

Vexillum anthracinum is a species of sea snail, a marine gastropod mollusk, in the family Costellariidae, the ribbed miters.

== Description ==
The length of the shell attains 13.5 mm.

The shell is covered by a smooth, black epidermis.

== Distribution ==
This marine species occurs off the Philippines and New Caledonia.
