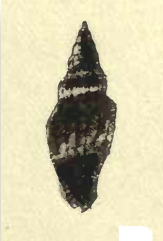
- Drawing of a shell of Vexillum vibex

Scientific classification
- Kingdom: Animalia
- Phylum: Mollusca
- Class: Gastropoda
- Subclass: Caenogastropoda
- Order: Neogastropoda
- Family: Costellariidae
- Genus: Vexillum
- Species: V. vibex

Binomial name
- Vexillum vibex (A. Adams, 1853)

Synonyms
- Mitra vibex A. Adams, 1853 superseded combination; Vexillum (Costellaria) vibex (A. Adams, 1853)

= Vexillum vibex =

Species of gastropod

Vexillum vibex is a species of small sea snail, marine gastropod mollusk in the family Costellariidae, the ribbed miters.

== Description ==
The length off the shell attains 21 mm.

== Distribution ==
This marine species occurs off the Philippines.
