= Vexillum dahanaensis =

Scientific classification
- Kingdom: Animalia
- Phylum: Mollusca
- Class: Gastropoda
- Subclass: Caenogastropoda
- Order: Neogastropoda
- Superfamily: Turbinelloidea
- Family: Costellariidae
- Genus: Vexillum
- Species: †V. dahanaensis

Binomial name
- †Vexillum dahanaensis (Vlerk, 1931)

Synonyms
- † Turricula (Vulpecula) martini Icke & K. Martin, 1907 (invalid: not Icke & Martin, 1907; Turricula dahanaensis Vlerk, 1931 is a replacement name); † Turricula dahanaensis Vlerk, 1931 †; † Vexillum martini (Icke & K. Martin, 1907)

Species of gastropod

Vexillum dahanaensis is an extinct species of sea snail, a marine gastropod mollusk, in the family Costellariidae, the ribbed miters.
