= Vexillum taeniataeformis =

Scientific classification
- Kingdom: Animalia
- Phylum: Mollusca
- Class: Gastropoda
- Subclass: Caenogastropoda
- Order: Neogastropoda
- Superfamily: Turbinelloidea
- Family: Costellariidae
- Genus: Vexillum
- Species: †V. taeniataeformis

Binomial name
- †Vexillum taeniataeformis (K. Martin, 1884)

Synonyms
- † Mitra (Turricula) taeniataeformis K. Martin, 1884; † Turricula (Vulpecula) taeniataeformis (K. Martin, 1884)

Species of gastropod

Vexillum taeniataeformis is an extinct species of sea snail, a marine gastropod mollusk, in the family Costellariidae, the ribbed miters.

== Distribution ==
Fossils of this marine species were found in Pliocene strata in Java, Indonesia.
