= Vexillum nodai =

Scientific classification
- Kingdom: Animalia
- Phylum: Mollusca
- Class: Gastropoda
- Subclass: Caenogastropoda
- Order: Neogastropoda
- Superfamily: Turbinelloidea
- Family: Costellariidae
- Genus: Vexillum
- Species: V. nodai

Binomial name
- Vexillum nodai Turner & Salisbury, 1999

Synonyms
- Vexillum (Costellaria) nodai H. Turner & R. Salisbury, 1999

Species of gastropod

Vexillum nodai is a species of small sea snail, marine gastropod mollusk in the family Costellariidae, the ribbed miters.

== Description ==
The length of the shell attains 30 mm, its diameter 9.7 mm.

== Distribution ==
This marine species occurs KwaZulu-Natal, South Africa; also off the Philippines and Japan.
