= Vexillum fuscotaeniatum =

Scientific classification
- Kingdom: Animalia
- Phylum: Mollusca
- Class: Gastropoda
- Subclass: Caenogastropoda
- Order: Neogastropoda
- Family: Costellariidae
- Genus: Vexillum
- Species: V. fuscotaeniatum

Binomial name
- Vexillum fuscotaeniatum (Thiele, 1925)

Synonyms
- Turricula fuscotaeniata Thiele, 1925 (original combination); Vexillum (Costellaria) fuscotaeniatum (Thiele, 1925)

Species of gastropod

Vexillum fuscotaeniatum is a species of small sea snail, marine gastropod mollusk in the family Costellariidae, the ribbed miters.

== Description ==
The length of the shell attains 7.3 mm.

== Distribution ==
This marine species occurs off Sumatra.
