= Vexillum beverlyae =

Scientific classification
- Kingdom: Animalia
- Phylum: Mollusca
- Class: Gastropoda
- Subclass: Caenogastropoda
- Order: Neogastropoda
- Superfamily: Turbinelloidea
- Family: Costellariidae
- Genus: Vexillum
- Species: V. beverlyae

Binomial name
- Vexillum beverlyae Turner & Salisbury, 1999

Synonyms
- Vexillum (Costellaria) beverlyae H. Turner & R. Salisbury, 1999 ·

Species of gastropod

Vexillum beverlyae is a species of small sea snail, marine gastropod mollusk in the family Costellariidae, the ribbed miters.

== Description ==
The length of the shell attains 31 mm, its diameter is 9.24 mm.

== Distribution ==
This marine species occurs off the Solomon Islands.
