= Vexillum charlesi =

Scientific classification
- Kingdom: Animalia
- Phylum: Mollusca
- Class: Gastropoda
- Subclass: Caenogastropoda
- Order: Neogastropoda
- Superfamily: Turbinelloidea
- Family: Costellariidae
- Genus: Vexillum
- Species: V. charlesi

Binomial name
- Vexillum charlesi Turner & Callomon, 2001

Synonyms
- Pusia charlesi H. Turner & P. Callomon, 2001; Vexillum (Pusia) charlesi H. Turner & Callomon, 2001

Species of gastropod

Vexillum charlesi is a species of small sea snail, marine gastropod mollusk in the family Costellariidae, the ribbed miters.

== Description ==
The length of the shell attains 16 mm.

== Distribution ==
This marine species occurs off Japan and the Philippines.
