= Vexillum noduliferum =

Scientific classification
- Kingdom: Animalia
- Phylum: Mollusca
- Class: Gastropoda
- Subclass: Caenogastropoda
- Order: Neogastropoda
- Superfamily: Turbinelloidea
- Family: Costellariidae
- Genus: Vexillum
- Species: V. noduliferum

Binomial name
- Vexillum noduliferum (A. Adams, 1853)

Synonyms
- Mitra nodulifera A. Adams, 1853 superseded combination; Vexillum (Costellaria) noduliferum (A. Adams, 1853)

Species of gastropod

Vexillum noduliferum is a species of small sea snail, marine gastropod mollusk in the family Costellariidae, the ribbed miters.

== Description ==
The length of the shell attains 18 mm.

== Distribution ==
This marine species occurs off the Philippines.
