= Vexillum boreocinctum =

Scientific classification
- Kingdom: Animalia
- Phylum: Mollusca
- Class: Gastropoda
- Subclass: Caenogastropoda
- Order: Neogastropoda
- Superfamily: Turbinelloidea
- Family: Costellariidae
- Genus: Vexillum
- Species: †V. boreocinctum

Binomial name
- †Vexillum boreocinctum (Kautsky, 1925)

Synonyms
- Vexillum (Uromitra) boreocinctum Kautsky, 1925

Species of gastropod

Vexillum boreocinctum is an extinct species of sea snail, a marine gastropod mollusk, in the family Costellariidae, the ribbed miters.

== Distribution ==
Fossils of this marine species were found in Middle Miocene strata in Slovakia and Germany (16.0 - 11.6 Ma).
