= Vexillum leforti =

Scientific classification
- Kingdom: Animalia
- Phylum: Mollusca
- Class: Gastropoda
- Subclass: Caenogastropoda
- Order: Neogastropoda
- Superfamily: Turbinelloidea
- Family: Costellariidae
- Genus: Vexillum
- Species: V. leforti

Binomial name
- Vexillum leforti Turner & Salisbury, 1999

Synonyms
- Vexillum (Costellaria) leforti Turner & Salisbury, 1999

Species of gastropod

Vexillum leforti is a species of small sea snail, marine gastropod mollusk in the family Costellariidae, the ribbed miters.

== Description ==
The length of the shell attains 20 mm, its diameter is 6.2 mm.

== Distribution ==
This marine species occurs off the Philippines, in the East China Sea and off Japan.
