= Vexillum albolineatum =

Scientific classification
- Kingdom: Animalia
- Phylum: Mollusca
- Class: Gastropoda
- Subclass: Caenogastropoda
- Order: Neogastropoda
- Family: Costellariidae
- Genus: Vexillum
- Species: V. albolineatum

Binomial name
- Vexillum albolineatum Cossignani & Cossignani, 2007

Species of gastropod

Vexillum albolineatum is a species of small sea snail, marine gastropod mollusk in the family Costellariidae, the ribbed miters.

== Description ==
The length of the shell attains 14 mm and a smaller width, while having a uniquely marked orange and white texture. The entrance is somewhat long compared to the average snail. Like all ribbed miters, this species is carnivorous.

== Distribution ==
This marine species occurs off Western Australia.
