= Vexillum garciai =

Scientific classification
- Kingdom: Animalia
- Phylum: Mollusca
- Class: Gastropoda
- Subclass: Caenogastropoda
- Order: Neogastropoda
- Superfamily: Turbinelloidea
- Family: Costellariidae
- Genus: Vexillum
- Species: V. garciai

Binomial name
- Vexillum garciai Salisbury & Wolff, 2009

Synonyms
- Vexillum (Costellaria) garciai R. Salisbury & Wolff, 2009

Species of gastropod

Vexillum garciai is a species of small sea snail, marine gastropod mollusk in the family Costellariidae, the ribbed miters.

== Description ==
The length of the shell attains 7.1 mm.

== Distribution ==
This species occurs in the Gulf of Mexico off Mexico.
