= Vexillum gliberti =

Scientific classification
- Kingdom: Animalia
- Phylum: Mollusca
- Class: Gastropoda
- Subclass: Caenogastropoda
- Order: Neogastropoda
- Superfamily: Turbinelloidea
- Family: Costellariidae
- Genus: Vexillum
- Species: †V. gliberti

Binomial name
- †Vexillum gliberti Anderson, 1964

Synonyms
- Vexillum (Uromitra) gliberti Anderson, 1964

Species of gastropod

Vexillum gliberti is an extinct species of sea snail, a marine gastropod mollusk, in the family Costellariidae, the ribbed miters.

== Description ==
The length of the shell attains 30 mm.

== Distribution ==
Fossils of this marine species were found in Miocene strata in the Netherlands.
