= Vexillum vandervlerki =

Scientific classification
- Kingdom: Animalia
- Phylum: Mollusca
- Class: Gastropoda
- Subclass: Caenogastropoda
- Order: Neogastropoda
- Superfamily: Turbinelloidea
- Family: Costellariidae
- Genus: Vexillum
- Species: V. vandervlerki

Binomial name
- Vexillum vandervlerki (Koperberg, 1931)

Synonyms
- Turricula (Uromitra) vandervlerki Koperberg, 1931

Species of gastropod

Vexillum vandervlerki is a species of sea snail, a marine gastropod mollusk, in the family Costellariidae, the ribbed miters.

== Description ==
The length of the shell attains 35.9 mm.

== Distribution ==
This marine species occurs off the Philippines.
