= Vexillum oryzum =

Scientific classification
- Kingdom: Animalia
- Phylum: Mollusca
- Class: Gastropoda
- Subclass: Caenogastropoda
- Order: Neogastropoda
- Family: Costellariidae
- Genus: Vexillum
- Species: V. oryzum

Binomial name
- Vexillum oryzum Kay, 1979

Synonyms
- Vexillum (Pusia) oryza Turner, 2001 (unjustified emendation of oryzum); Vexillum (Pusia) oryzum Kay, 1979

Species of gastropod

Vexillum oryzum is a species of small sea snail, marine gastropod mollusk in the family Costellariidae, the ribbed miters.

== Description ==
The length of the shell attains 6 mm.

== Distribution ==
This marine species occurs off Palau.
