= Vexillum alfuricum =

Scientific classification
- Kingdom: Animalia
- Phylum: Mollusca
- Class: Gastropoda
- Subclass: Caenogastropoda
- Order: Neogastropoda
- Superfamily: Turbinelloidea
- Family: Costellariidae
- Genus: Vexillum
- Species: V. alfuricum

Binomial name
- Vexillum alfuricum (P. J. Fischer, 1927)

Synonyms
- † Turricula (Vulpecula) alfurica P. J. Fischer, 1927 †

Species of gastropod

Vexillum alfuricum is an extinct species of sea snail, a marine gastropod mollusk, in the family Costellariidae, the ribbed miters.

== Distribution ==
Fossils of this marine species were found in Pliocene strata in Indonesia.
