= Vexillum mccauslandi =

Scientific classification
- Kingdom: Animalia
- Phylum: Mollusca
- Class: Gastropoda
- Subclass: Caenogastropoda
- Order: Neogastropoda
- Superfamily: Turbinelloidea
- Family: Costellariidae
- Genus: Vexillum
- Species: V. mccauslandi

Binomial name
- Vexillum mccauslandi Salisbury & Wolff, 2005

Synonyms
- Vexillum (Costellaria) mccauslandi R. Salisbury & Wolff, 2005 ·

Species of gastropod

Vexillum mccauslandi is a species of small sea snail in the family Costellariidae.

== Description ==
The length of the shell attains 23 mm.

== Distribution ==
This marine species occurs off Flores, Indonesia.
