= Vexillum leucophryna =

Scientific classification
- Kingdom: Animalia
- Phylum: Mollusca
- Class: Gastropoda
- Subclass: Caenogastropoda
- Order: Neogastropoda
- Family: Costellariidae
- Genus: Vexillum
- Species: V. leucophryna

Binomial name
- Vexillum leucophryna Turner & Marrow, 2001

Synonyms
- Vexillum (Costellaria) leucophryna H. Turner & Marrow, 2001

Species of gastropod

Vexillum leucophryna is a species of small sea snail, marine gastropod mollusk in the family Costellariidae, the ribbed miters.

== Description ==
The length of the shell attains 13 mm.

== Distribution ==
This marine species occurs off the Philippines and in the East China Sea.
