= Vexillum silviae =

Scientific classification
- Kingdom: Animalia
- Phylum: Mollusca
- Class: Gastropoda
- Subclass: Caenogastropoda
- Order: Neogastropoda
- Family: Costellariidae
- Genus: Vexillum
- Species: V. silviae

Binomial name
- Vexillum silviae Turner, Gori & Salisbury, 2007

Synonyms
- Vexillum (Pusia) silviae H. Turner, Gori & R. Salisbury, 2007 ·

Species of gastropod

Vexillum silviae is a species of small sea snail, marine gastropod mollusk in the family Costellariidae, the ribbed miters.

== Description ==
The length of the shell attains 18.4 mm.

== Distribution ==
This marine species occurs off the Maldives.
