= Vexillum badense =

Scientific classification
- Kingdom: Animalia
- Phylum: Mollusca
- Class: Gastropoda
- Subclass: Caenogastropoda
- Order: Neogastropoda
- Superfamily: Turbinelloidea
- Family: Costellariidae
- Genus: Vexillum
- Species: †V. badense

Binomial name
- †Vexillum badense (R. Hoernes & Auinger, 1880)

Synonyms
- † Mitra (Costellaria) badensis R. Hoernes & Auinger, 188 ·

Species of gastropod

Vexillum badense is an extinct species of sea snail, a marine gastropod mollusk, in the family Costellariidae, the ribbed miters.

== Description ==
The length of the shell varies between 19 mm and 27 mm.
