= Vexillum gagei =

Scientific classification
- Kingdom: Animalia
- Phylum: Mollusca
- Class: Gastropoda
- Subclass: Caenogastropoda
- Order: Neogastropoda
- Superfamily: Turbinelloidea
- Family: Costellariidae
- Genus: Vexillum
- Species: V. gagei

Binomial name
- Vexillum gagei Salisbury, 2011

Synonyms
- Vexillum (Pusia) gagei Salisbury, 2011

Species of gastropod

Vexillum gagei is a species of sea snail, a marine gastropod mollusk, in the family Costellariidae, the ribbed miters.

== Description ==
The length of the shell attains 16 mm.

== Distribution ==
This marine species occurs off the Marshall Islands.
