= Vexillum gorii =

Scientific classification
- Kingdom: Animalia
- Phylum: Mollusca
- Class: Gastropoda
- Subclass: Caenogastropoda
- Order: Neogastropoda
- Family: Costellariidae
- Genus: Vexillum
- Species: V. gorii

Binomial name
- Vexillum gorii Turner, 1997

Synonyms
- Vexillum (Costellaria) gorii H. Turner, 1997

Species of gastropod

Vexillum gorii is a species of small sea snail, marine gastropod mollusk in the family Costellariidae, the ribbed miters.

== Description ==
Vexillum gorii is about 18 mm long. They are white to light brown in color.

== Distribution ==
This species occurs in the Red Sea and off Somalia.
