= Vexillum nasongoense =

Scientific classification
- Kingdom: Animalia
- Phylum: Mollusca
- Class: Gastropoda
- Subclass: Caenogastropoda
- Order: Neogastropoda
- Superfamily: Turbinelloidea
- Family: Costellariidae
- Genus: Vexillum
- Species: †V. nasongoense

Binomial name
- †Vexillum nasongoense (Ladd, 1934)

Synonyms
- † Mitra (Tiara) nasongoensis Ladd, 1934

Species of gastropod

Vexillum nasongoense is an extinct species of sea snail, a marine gastropod mollusk, in the family Costellariidae, the ribbed miters.

== Distribution ==
Fossils of this marine species were found in Fiji.
