= Vexillum togianense =

Scientific classification
- Kingdom: Animalia
- Phylum: Mollusca
- Class: Gastropoda
- Subclass: Caenogastropoda
- Order: Neogastropoda
- Superfamily: Turbinelloidea
- Family: Costellariidae
- Genus: Vexillum
- Species: V. togianense

Binomial name
- Vexillum togianense Herrmann & Kurtz, 2013

Synonyms
- Pusia togianense M. Herrmann & I. Kurtz, 2013; Vexillum (Pusia) togianense Herrmann & Kurtz, 2013

Species of gastropod

Vexillum togianense is a species of sea snail, a marine gastropod mollusk, in the family Costellariidae, the ribbed miters.
