= Vexillum coloreum =

Scientific classification
- Kingdom: Animalia
- Phylum: Mollusca
- Class: Gastropoda
- Subclass: Caenogastropoda
- Order: Neogastropoda
- Superfamily: Turbinelloidea
- Family: Costellariidae
- Genus: Vexillum
- Species: V. coloreum

Binomial name
- Vexillum coloreum Huang, 2017

Species of gastropod

Vexillum coloreum is a species of sea snail, a marine gastropod mollusk, in the family Costellariidae, the ribbed miters.

== Description ==
The length of the shell attains 9 mm.

== Distribution ==
This species occurs in the Philippines.

== Behaviour ==
Vexillium coloreum is a predator.
