= Vexillum blandulum =

Scientific classification
- Kingdom: Animalia
- Phylum: Mollusca
- Class: Gastropoda
- Subclass: Caenogastropoda
- Order: Neogastropoda
- Family: Costellariidae
- Genus: Vexillum
- Species: V. blandulum

Binomial name
- Vexillum blandulum Turner, 1997

Synonyms
- Vexillum (Costellaria) blandulum H. Turner, 1997

Species of gastropod

Vexillum blandulum is a species of small sea snail, marine gastropod mollusk in the family Costellariidae, the ribbed miters.

== Description ==
The length of the shell attains 22.8 mm.

== Distribution ==
This species occurs in the Red Sea.
