= Vexillum terraqueum =

Scientific classification
- Kingdom: Animalia
- Phylum: Mollusca
- Class: Gastropoda
- Subclass: Caenogastropoda
- Order: Neogastropoda
- Superfamily: Turbinelloidea
- Family: Costellariidae
- Genus: Vexillum
- Species: V. terraqueum

Binomial name
- Vexillum terraqueum Huang, 2017

Species of gastropod

Vexillum terraqueum is a species of sea snail, a marine gastropod mollusk, in the family Costellariidae, the ribbed miters.

== Description ==
The length of the shell attains 15 mm.

== Distribution ==
This species occurs in the following locations:

- Honshu Island
- Okinawa
