= Vexillum vezzaroi =

Scientific classification
- Kingdom: Animalia
- Phylum: Mollusca
- Class: Gastropoda
- Subclass: Caenogastropoda
- Order: Neogastropoda
- Superfamily: Turbinelloidea
- Family: Costellariidae
- Genus: Vexillum
- Species: V. vezzaroi

Binomial name
- Vexillum vezzaroi Cossignani, 2021

Species of gastropod

Vexillum vezzaroi is a species of sea snail, a marine gastropod mollusk, in the family Costellariidae, the ribbed miters.

== Description ==
Shell size 50-60 mm.

== Distribution ==
This marine species occurs off North Borneo and the Philippines.
