= Vexillum nivale =

Scientific classification
- Kingdom: Animalia
- Phylum: Mollusca
- Class: Gastropoda
- Subclass: Caenogastropoda
- Order: Neogastropoda
- Family: Costellariidae
- Genus: Vexillum
- Species: V. nivale

Binomial name
- Vexillum nivale Herrmann & Guillot de Suduiraut, 2009

Species of gastropod

Vexillum nivale is a species of small sea snail, marine gastropod mollusk in the family Costellariidae, the ribbed miters.

== Description ==
The shell ranges in color from brown to a light beige. The length of the shell attains 50.5 mm.

== Distribution ==
This marine species occurs off the Philippines.
