= Vexillum creatum =

Scientific classification
- Kingdom: Animalia
- Phylum: Mollusca
- Class: Gastropoda
- Subclass: Caenogastropoda
- Order: Neogastropoda
- Superfamily: Turbinelloidea
- Family: Costellariidae
- Genus: Vexillum
- Species: V. creatum

Binomial name
- Vexillum creatum Marrow, 2019

Species of gastropod

Vexillum creatum is a species of small sea snail, marine gastropod mollusk in the family Costellariidae, the ribbed miters.

== Description ==
The length of the shell attains 13.1 mm.

== Distribution ==
This marine species was found off Exmouth Gulf (north end), Western Australia.
