= Vexillum flaveoricum =

Scientific classification
- Kingdom: Animalia
- Phylum: Mollusca
- Class: Gastropoda
- Subclass: Caenogastropoda
- Order: Neogastropoda
- Family: Costellariidae
- Genus: Vexillum
- Species: V. flaveoricum

Binomial name
- Vexillum flaveoricum Herrmann & Guillot de Suduiraut, 2009

Species of gastropod

Vexillum flaveoricum is a species of small sea snail, marine gastropod mollusk in the family Costellariidae, the ribbed miters.

== Description ==
The length of the shell attains a length of 59.6 mm.

== Distribution ==
This marine species occurs off the Philippines.
