= Vexillum kawamotoae =

Scientific classification
- Kingdom: Animalia
- Phylum: Mollusca
- Class: Gastropoda
- Subclass: Caenogastropoda
- Order: Neogastropoda
- Superfamily: Turbinelloidea
- Family: Costellariidae
- Genus: Vexillum
- Species: V. kawamotoae

Binomial name
- Vexillum kawamotoae Salisbury, 2011

Synonyms
- Vexillum (Costellaria) kawamotoae Salisbury, 2011

Species of gastropod

Vexillum kawamotoae is a species of sea snail, a marine gastropod mollusk, in the family Costellariidae, the ribbed miters.
