= Vexillum hansturneri =

Scientific classification
- Kingdom: Animalia
- Phylum: Mollusca
- Class: Gastropoda
- Subclass: Caenogastropoda
- Order: Neogastropoda
- Superfamily: Turbinelloidea
- Family: Costellariidae
- Genus: Vexillum
- Species: V. hansturneri

Binomial name
- Vexillum hansturneri Gori, Rosado & R. Salisbury, 2019

Species of gastropod

Vexillum hansturneri is a species of sea snail, a marine gastropod mollusk, in the family Costellariidae, the ribbed miters.

== Distribution ==
This marine species occurs off Oman.
