= Vexillum janae =

Scientific classification
- Kingdom: Animalia
- Phylum: Mollusca
- Class: Gastropoda
- Subclass: Caenogastropoda
- Order: Neogastropoda
- Superfamily: Turbinelloidea
- Family: Costellariidae
- Genus: Vexillum
- Species: V. janae

Binomial name
- Vexillum janae T. Cossignani & Lorenz, 2020

Species of gastropod

Vexillum janae is a species of small sea snail, marine gastropod mollusk in the family Costellariidae, the ribbed miters.

== Distribution ==
This marine species occurs off in the Caribbean Sea off Curaçao.
