= Vexillum caligulum =

Scientific classification
- Kingdom: Animalia
- Phylum: Mollusca
- Class: Gastropoda
- Subclass: Caenogastropoda
- Order: Neogastropoda
- Family: Costellariidae
- Genus: Vexillum
- Species: V. caligulum

Binomial name
- Vexillum caligulum S.-I Huang & M.-H. Lin, 2020

Species of gastropod

Vexillum caligulum is a species of small sea snail, marine gastropod mollusk in the family Costellariidae, the ribbed miters.

== Distribution ==
This marine species occurs off the Philippines.
