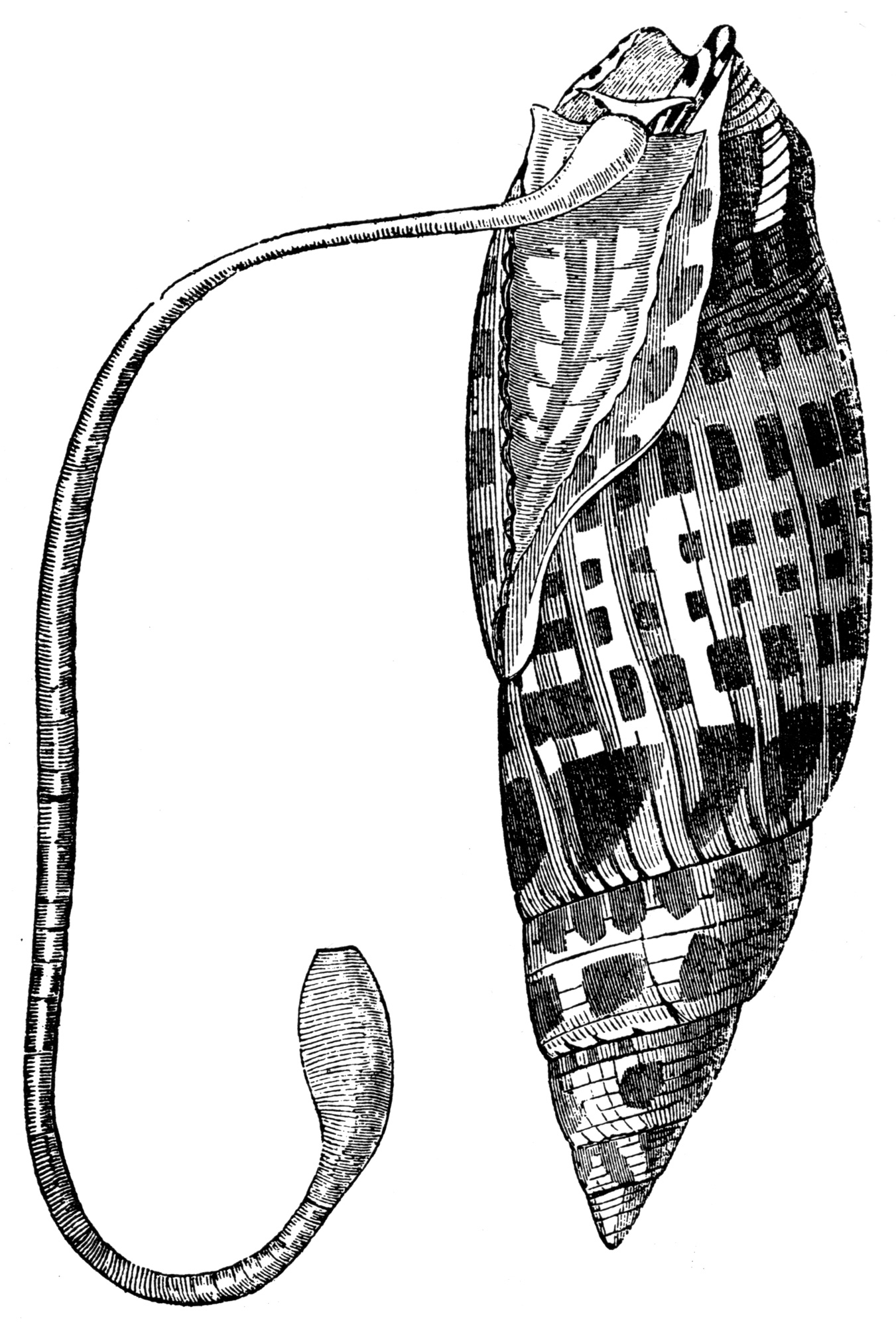
- A drawing of a live individual of Mitra mitra showing its long proboscis

Scientific classification
- Kingdom: Animalia
- Phylum: Mollusca
- Class: Gastropoda
- Subclass: Caenogastropoda
- Order: Neogastropoda
- Family: Mitridae
- Subfamily: Mitrinae
- Genus: Mitra; Lamarck, 1798

Type species
- Mitra mitra (Linnaeus, 1758)

Species
- See text

Synonyms
- Mitra (Mitra) Lamarck, 1798; Mitra (Mitraria) Rafinesque, 1815 (established, without diagnosis or included species, as a substitute name for Mitra Lamarck, 1798) ·; Mitra (Papalaria) Dall, 1915; Mitra (Sohlia) Cernohorsky, 1970; Mitraria Rafinesque, 1815 (established, without diagnosis or included species, as a substitute name for Mitra Lamarck, 1798); Mitraria (Mitraria) Rafinesque, 1815 (established, without diagnosis or included species, as a substitute name for Mitra Lamarck, 1798); Tiarella Swainson, 1840

= Mitra (gastropod) =

Genus of gastropods

Mitra is a large genus of medium to large predatory sea snails, marine gastropod mollusks in the family Mitridae, the miter shells or mitre snails.

This genus is named after the ecclesiastical headgear, the miter, because of the shells' general shape.

These sea snails create shells that are considered attractive by shell collectors; the shells are solid, high-spired and are often colorful.

== Description ==
The thick shell has a fusiform shape. The spire is elevated and acute at the apex. The aperture is small, narrow and notched in front. The columella is obliquely plicate. The outer lip is thickene and is smooth internally.

== Species ==
Many species that were previously in the genus Mitra have been reassigned in the past years to other genera, including Calcimitra, Gemmulimitra, Isara, Nebularia, Neotiara, Pseudonebularia, Quasimitra, Roseomitra, Strigatella and Vexillum. According to the World Register of Marine Species, the following species with accepted names are currently included within the genus Mitra:

- Mitra abbatis Perry, 1811
- Mitra deprofundis Turner, 2001
- Mitra filius Melvill, 1925
- Mitra fortis Melvill, 1925
- † Mitra hectori Hutton, 1905
- Mitra inca d'Orbigny, 1841
- Mitra marciae G. B. Sowerby III, 1913 (uncertain)
- Mitra mitraLinnaeus, 1758
- Mitra papalis (Linnaeus, 1758)
- Mitra stictica (Link, 1807)
- † Mitra subscrobiculata d'Orbigny, 1852
- Mitra turgida Reeve, 1845

Species in this genus also include:

- Mitra saldanha Matthews & Rios, 1970

Taxa inquirenda

- Mitra clara G. B. Sowerby II, 1874
- Mitra fergusoni G. B. Sowerby II, 1874
- Mitra minor G. B. Sowerby II, 1874
- Mitra nasuta G. B. Sowerby II, 1874
- Mitra novaehollandiae G. B. Sowerby II, 1874
- Mitra radula G. B. Sowerby II, 1874
- Mitra semiconica G. B. Sowerby II, 1874
- Mitra subrostrata G. B. Sowerby II, 1874
- Mitra tenuilirata G. B. Sowerby II, 1874
- Mitra trunculus G. B. Sowerby II, 1874
- Mitra umbonata G. B. Sowerby II, 1870

== Synonyms ==
- Mitra acutilirata G. B. Sowerby II, 1874: synonym of Subcancilla annulata (Reeve, 1844)
- Mitra albozonata W. H. Turton, 1932: synonym of Quasimitra latruncularia (Reeve, 1844)
- Mitra ansulata G. B. Sowerby II, 1874: synonym of Vexillum histrio (Reeve, 1844)
- Mitra arctata G. B. Sowerby II, 1874: synonym of Pterygia arctata (G. B. Sowerby II, 1874)
- Mitra arracanensis G. B. Sowerby II, 1874: synonym of Vexillum cithara (Reeve, 1845)
- Mitra articulata Reeve, 1845: synonym of Vexillum articulatum (Reeve, 1845)
- Mitra aubryana Hervier, 1897: synonym of Vexillum fortiplicatum (Pease, 1868)
- Mitra australis Swainson, 1820: synonym of Turriplicifer australis (Swainson, 1820)
- Mitra bifasciata Swainson, 1822: synonym of Vexillum caffrum (Linnaeus, 1758)
- Mitra brasiliensi] Oliveira, 1869: synonym of Neotiara nodulosa (Gmelin, 1791)
- Mitra cernica G. B. Sowerby II, 1874: synonym of Thala cernica (G. B. Sowerby II, 1874)
- Mitra cineracea Reeve, 1845: synonym of Vexillum leucozonias (Deshayes, 1833)
- Mitra crassicostata G. B. Sowerby II, 1874: synonym of Strigatella crassicostata (G. B. Sowerby II, 1874)
- Mitra cretacea G. B. Sowerby II, 1874: synonym of Nebularia pellisserpentis (Reeve, 1844)
- Mitra dolorosa Dall, 1903 : synonym of Strigatella tristis (Broderip, 1836)
- Mitra filistriata G. B. Sowerby II, 1874: synonym of Vexillum filistriatum (G. B. Sowerby II, 1874)
- Mitra foveata G. B. Sowerby II, 1874: synonym of Mitromica foveata (G. B. Sowerby II, 1874)
- † Mitra fusioides Lea, 1833: synonym of Conomitra fusoides (I. Lea, 1833)
- Mitra gemmata G. B. Sowerby II, 187: synonym of Atlantilux gemmata (G. B. Sowerby II, 1874)
- Mitra granata Reeve, 1845: synonym of Nebularia pellisserpentis (Reeve, 1844)
- Mitra grelloisi Récluz, 1853: synonym of Nebularia pellisserpentis (Reeve, 1844)
- Mitra indentata G. B. Sowerby II, 1874 : synonym of Pseudonebularia indentata (G. B. Sowerby II, 1874)
- Mitra inermis Reeve, 1845: synonym of Vexillum inerme (Reeve, 1845)
- Mitra infrafasciata Souverbie, 1865: synonym of Pusia microzonias (Lamarck, 1811)
- Mitra insolata G. B. Sowerby II, 1874: synonym of Episcomitra cornicula (Linnaeus, 1758)
- Mitra laevicostata G. B. Sowerby II, 1874: synonym of Vexillum intertaeniatum (G. B. Sowerby II, 1874)
- Mitra laterculata G. B. Sowerby II, 1874: synonym of Nodicostellaria laterculata (G. B. Sowerby II, 1874)
- Mitra latruncularia Reeve, 1844 synonym of Quasimitra latruncularia (Reeve, 1844)
- † Mitra leucozona Andrzejowski, 1830: synonym of † Ebenomitra leucozona (Andrzejowski, 1830)
- Mitra lima G. B. Sowerby II, 1874: synonym of Pterygia lima (G. B. Sowerby II, 1874)
- Mitra longispira G. B. Sowerby II, 1874: synonym of Vexillum longispira (G. B. Sowerby II, 1874)
- Mitra lurida W. H. Turton, 1932: synonym of Vexillum patulum (Reeve, 1845)
- Mitra macandrewi G. B. Sowerby II, 1874: synonym of Vexillum macandrewi (G. B. Sowerby II, 1874)
- Mitra magnifica Poppe & Tagaro, 2006: synonym of Mitra mitra (Linnaeus, 1758)
- † Mitra marginata Lamarck, 1803: synonym of † Conomitra marginata (Lamarck, 1803)
- Mitra mauritiana G. B. Sowerby II, 1874: synonym of Quasimitra lacunosa (Reeve, 1844)
- Mitra microstoma G. B. Sowerby II, 1874: synonym of Nebularia pellisserpentis (Reeve, 1844)
- Mitra militaris Reeve, 1845: synonym of Vexillum militare (Reeve, 1845)
- Mitra multisulcata G. B. Sowerby III, 1914: synonym of Strigatella subruppelli (Finlay, 1927)
- Mitra muricata (Broderip, 1836): synonym of Neotiara muricata (Broderip, 1836)
- Mitra obtusispinosa G. B. Sowerby II, 1874: synonym of Vexillum obtusispinosum (G. B. Sowerby II, 1874)
- Mitra oniscina Lamarck, 1811: synonym of Vexillum oniscinum (Lamarck, 1811)
- Mitra paligera G. B. Sowerby II, 1874: synonym of Vexillum paligerum (G. B. Sowerby II, 1874)
- Mitra petrosa G. B. Sowerby II, 1874: synonym of Nebularia petrosa (G. B. Sowerby II, 1874)
- Mitra philippinarum A. Adams, 1853: synonym of Imbricaria bacillum (Lamarck, 1811)
- Mitra rectilateralis G. B. Sowerby II, 1874: synonym of Vexillum suluense (A. Adams & Reeve, 1850)
- Mitra rhodia Reeve, 1845: synonym of Isara carbonaria (Swainson, 1822)
- Mitra salmonea G. B. Sowerby II, 1874: synonym of Vexillum salmoneum (G. B. Sowerby II, 1874)
- Mitra scita Tenison Woods, 1876: synonym of Cernohorskyola scita (Tenison Woods, 1876)
- Mitra simplex G. B. Sowerby II, 1874: synonym of Episcomitra cornicula (Linnaeus, 1758)
- Mitra sphaerulata Martyn, 1784: synonym of Neocancilla papilio (Link, 1807)
- † Mitra striata Eichwald, 1830: synonym of † Ebenomitra leucozona (Andrzejowski, 1830)
- Mitra subtruncata G. B. Sowerby II, 1874: synonym of Vexillum subtruncatum (G. B. Sowerby II, 1874)
- Mitra tayloriana G. B. Sowerby II, 1874: synonym of Vexillum taylorianum (G. B. Sowerby II, 1874)
- Mitra telum G. B. Sowerby II, 1874: synonym of Strigatella fulvescens (Broderip, 1836)
- Mitra tenuis G. B. Sowerby II, 1874: synonym of Carinomitra typha (Reeve, 1845)
- Mitra umbrosa G. B. Sowerby II, 1874: synonym of Vexillum umbrosum (G. B. Sowerby II, 1874)
- Mitra uzielliana Crosse, 1861: synonym of Nebularia pellisserpentis (Reeve, 1844)
- Mitra variabilis Reeve, 1844: synonym of Quasimitra variabilis (Reeve, 1844)
- Mitra vezzaronellyae Cossignani, 2016: synonym of Nebularia peasei (Dohrn, 1860)
- Mitra zonalis Quoy & Gaimard, 1833: synonym of Vexillum caffrum (Linnaeus, 1758)

== Gallery ==
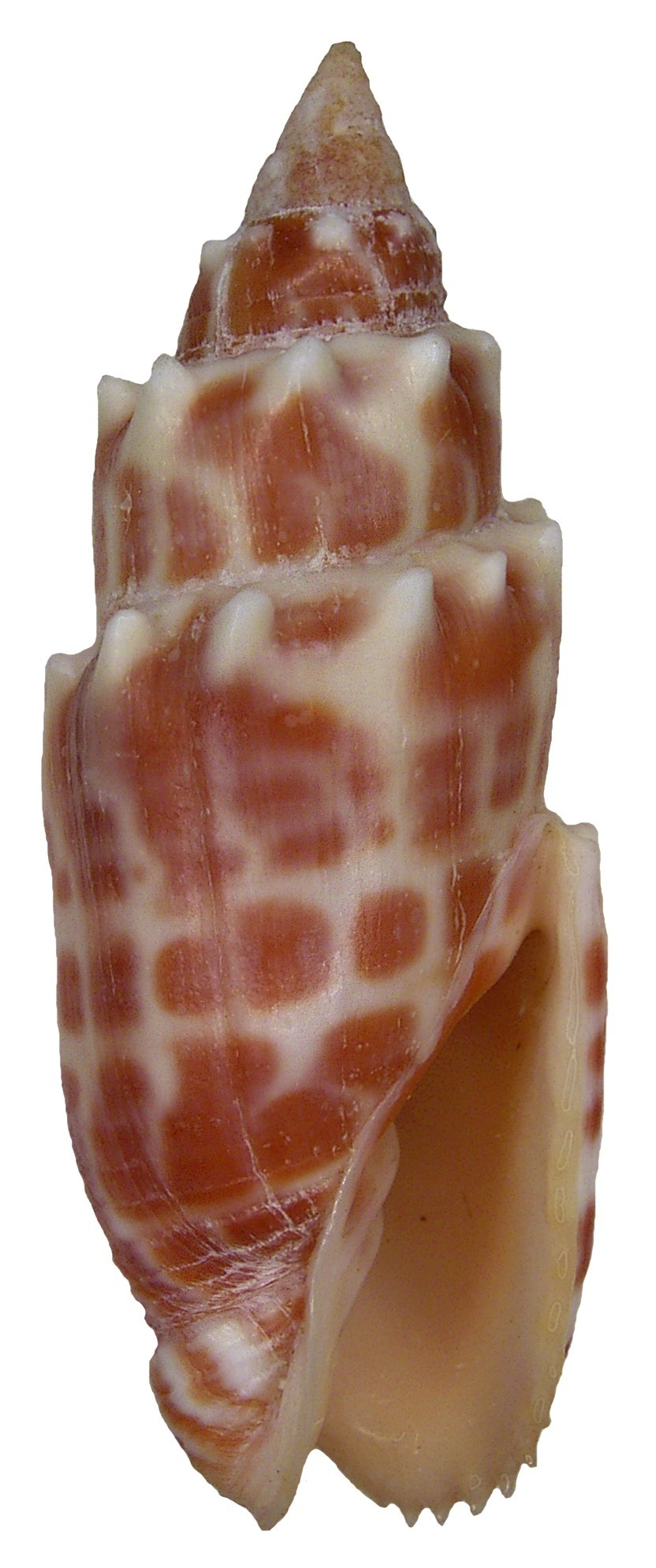
Mitra stictica shell
