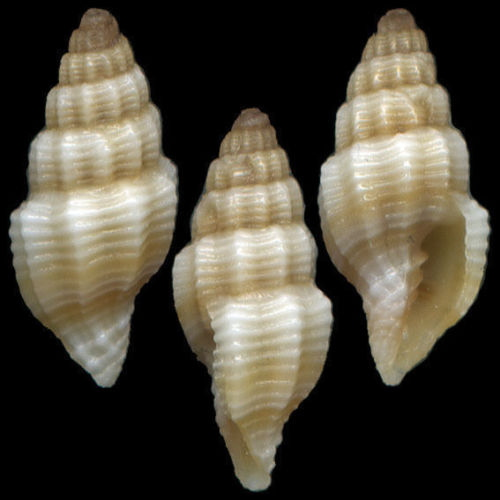
- Shell of Vexillum semiticum

Scientific classification
- Kingdom: Animalia
- Phylum: Mollusca
- Class: Gastropoda
- Subclass: Caenogastropoda
- Order: Neogastropoda
- Superfamily: Turbinelloidea
- Family: Costellariidae
- Genus: Vexillum
- Species: V. semiticum

Binomial name
- Vexillum semiticum (Jickeli, 1874)

Synonyms
- Turricula semitica Jickeli, 1874 (original combination); Turricula (Costellaria) semitica Jickeli, 1874; Vexillum (Costellaria) semiticum (Jickeli, 1874)

= Vexillum semiticum =

Species of gastropod

Vexillum semiticum is a species of small sea snail, marine gastropod mollusk in the family Costellariidae, the ribbed miters.

The Australian Faunal Directory considers this species as a synonym of Vexillum unifascialis (Lamarck, 1811).

== Description ==
The length of the shell varies between 7 mm and 15.3 mm.

The gray shell is solid, fusiform, half bent. The lower half of body whorl is ferruginous. It is longitudinally ribbed and spirally tightly folded. The spire is elongate. The shell consists of eight whorls The suture is a little diagonally impressed.The body whorl measures half the length of the shell. It is thickened at the upper edge and bends slightly forward. It is tapered at the base, with a slightly recurved siphonal canal. The longitudinal ribs are fairly close together, becoming somewhat wider near the body whorl. They are a little curved and above a little thickened. They are surrounded by sharply defined spirals (about 22 on the body whorl), The elongate aperture is slightly receding at the base, elongate. The upper half of its inside is white, the lower half is brown. . The outer lip is slightly wavy. The columella shows four plaits. The apertural wall is thickened with a callus.

This species is most similar to Vexillum leucozonias (G.P. Deshayes in E.S.J.L. de Laborde & M. Linant, 1834) (synonym: Costellaria judaeorum W.L.H. Dohrn, 1861), agreeing in the sculpture. But it differs by its rusty yellow color and its darker color on the upper part of the whorls. The longitudinal ribs are more closely together. The body whorl is larger, longer and has a smaller basis.

== Distribution ==
This marine species occurs off the Philippines.
