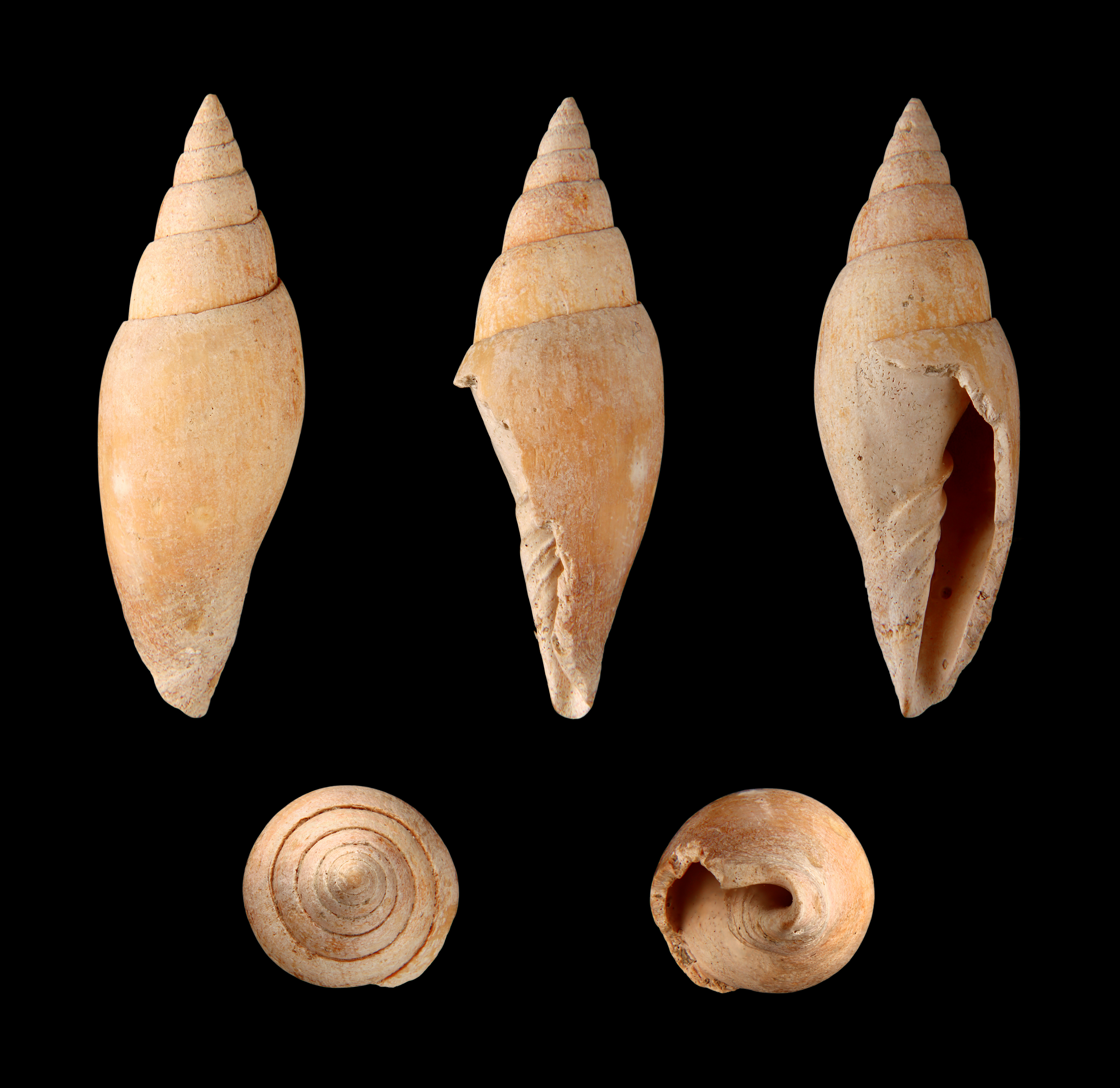

Scientific classification
- Kingdom: Animalia
- Phylum: Mollusca
- Class: Gastropoda
- Subclass: Caenogastropoda
- Order: Neogastropoda
- Family: Mitridae
- Genus: Mitra
- Species: M. fusiformis

Binomial name
- Mitra fusiformis (Brocchi, 1814)

= Mitra fusiformis =

Species of gastropod

Mitra fusiformis is a species of sea snail, a marine gastropod mollusc in the family Mitridae, the miters or miter snails.
