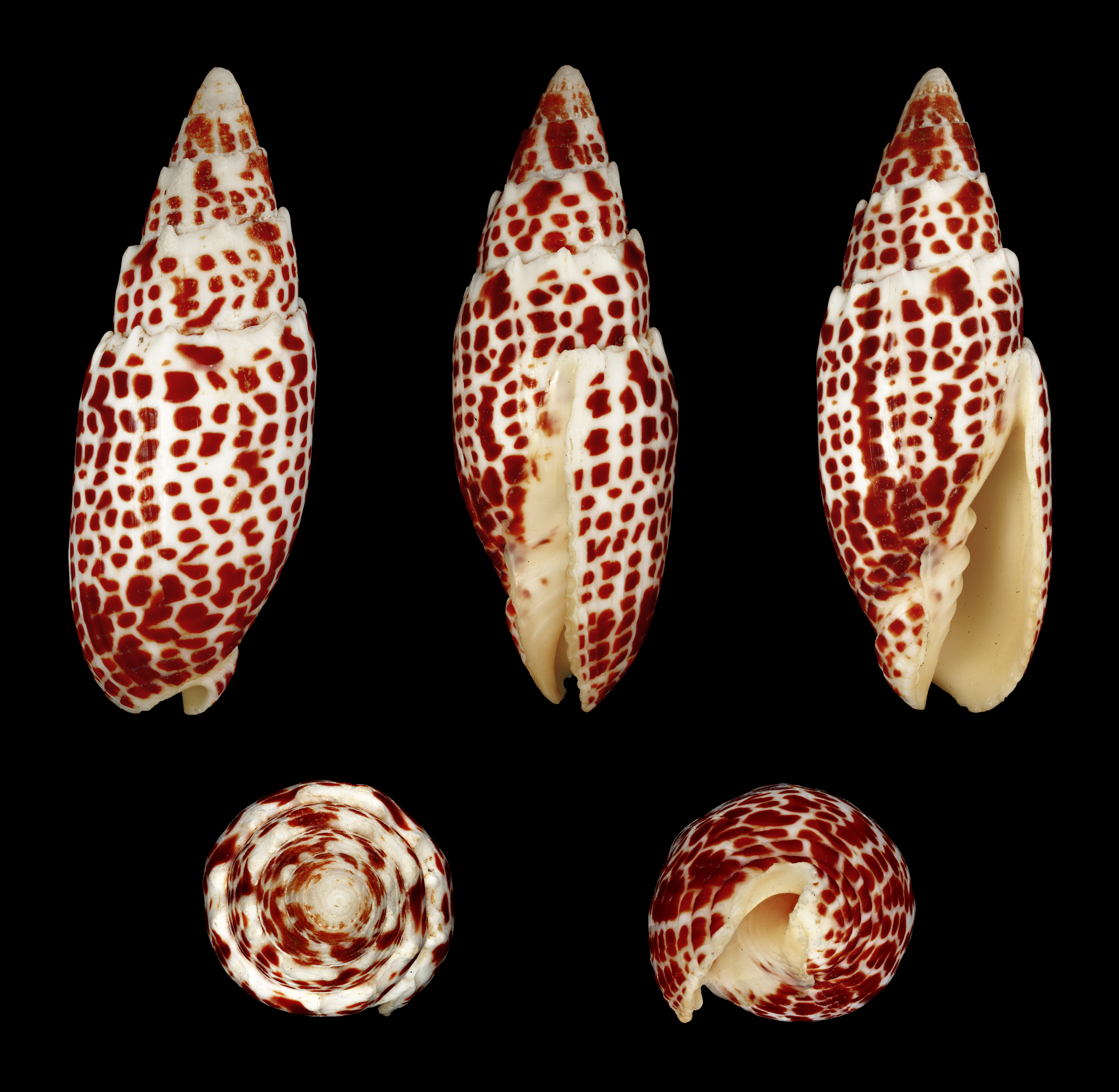
- Five views of a shell of Mitra papalis

Scientific classification
- Kingdom: Animalia
- Phylum: Mollusca
- Class: Gastropoda
- Subclass: Caenogastropoda
- Order: Neogastropoda
- Family: Mitridae
- Genus: Mitra
- Species: M. papalis

Binomial name
- Mitra papalis (Linnaeus, 1758)

Synonyms
- Mitra (Mitra) papalis (Linnaeus, 1758)

= Mitra papalis =

Species of gastropod

Mitra papalis, common name the Papal/Pontifical Mitre, is a species of sea snail, a marine gastropod mollusk in the family Mitridae, the miters.

== Distribution ==
This marine species is present in India and in the western Indo-Pacific (China, Paracel Islands, Taiwan, Philippines, New Guinea, Fiji, New Caledonia and Guam).

== Habitat ==
These sea snails live on coral reefs and under rocks, from the intertidal zone to a depth of about 30 m. Rarely, specimens are known from tangle nets at around 600 ft. depth.

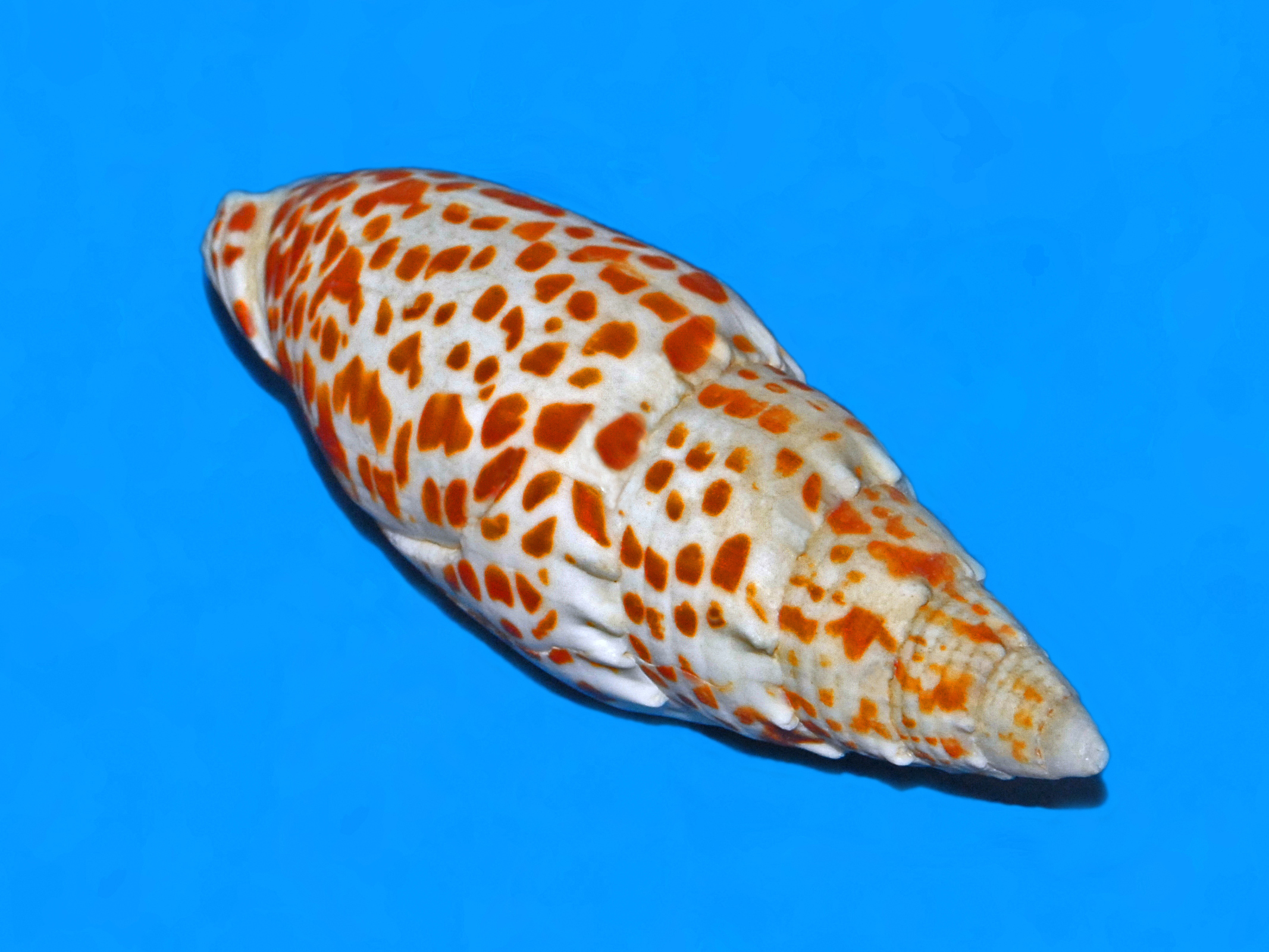
A shell of Mitra papalis

== Description ==
Shells of Mitra papalis can reach a length of about 60–166 millimetres (2.4–6.5 in). The form of these large shells is similar to a Papal mitre (hence the common name). They are elongate to ovate, fusiform and smooth but without axial streaks on the surface. Sutural coronations are present. The aperture is moderately wide, smooth within. The shell surface is white, with small white nodules under sutures and with several rows of irregular bright red-orange or purplish blotches.

This species is quite similar to Mitra stictica, but its body form is longer, with more adpressed sutures and wider nodules.

== Bibliography ==
- Alan G. Hinton - Guide to Shells of Papua New Guinea
- Alan G. Hinton - Shells of New Guinea & Central Pacific
- Arianna Fulvo and Roberto Nistri (2005). 350 coquillages du monde entier. Delachaux et Niestlé (Paris) : 256 p. (ISBN 2-603-01374-2)
- Cernohorsky W.O. (1976). The Mitridae of the World. Part I. The subfamily Mitrinae. Indo-Pacific Mollusca. 3(17): 273-528
- F. Springsteen and F. M. Leobrera - Shells of the Philippines
