= Proboscis =

Elongated mouth part

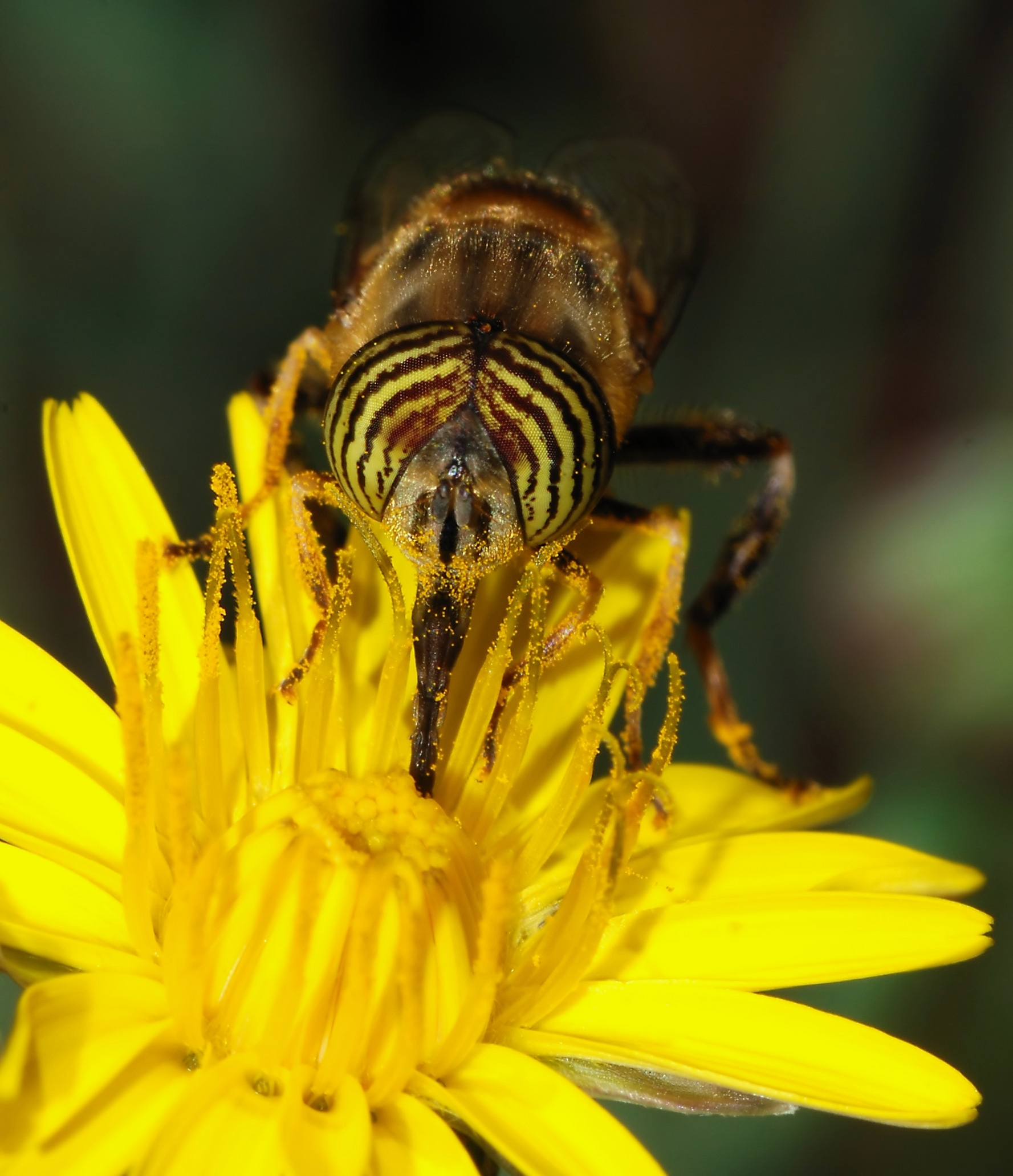
A syrphid fly using its proboscis to reach the nectar of a flower

A proboscis (/proʊˈbɒsɪs, -kɪs/) is an elongated appendage from the head of an animal, either a vertebrate or an invertebrate. In invertebrates, the term usually refers to tubular mouthparts used for feeding and sucking. In vertebrates, a proboscis is an elongated nose or snout.

== Etymology ==
First attested in English in 1609 from Latin proboscis, the latinisation of the Ancient Greek προβοσκίς (proboskis), which comes from πρό (pro) 'forth, forward, before' + βόσκω (bosko), 'to feed, to nourish'. The plural as derived from the Greek is proboscides, but in English the plural form proboscises occurs frequently.

== Invertebrates ==
The most common usage is to refer to the tubular feeding and sucking organ of certain invertebrates such as insects (e.g., moths, butterflies, and mosquitoes), worms (including Acanthocephala, proboscis worms) and gastropod molluscs.

=== Mosquitoes ===
Mosquitoes use their proboscis to suck up blood. Only the female mosquitoes take blood meals. Male proboscis are not strong enough to break human skin. Both female and male mosquitoes can feed on fruit and flower nectars. Their proboscis is sharp when examined on a molecular level; this feature has been used to research modifications to syringes and various medical equipment.

=== Acanthocephala ===
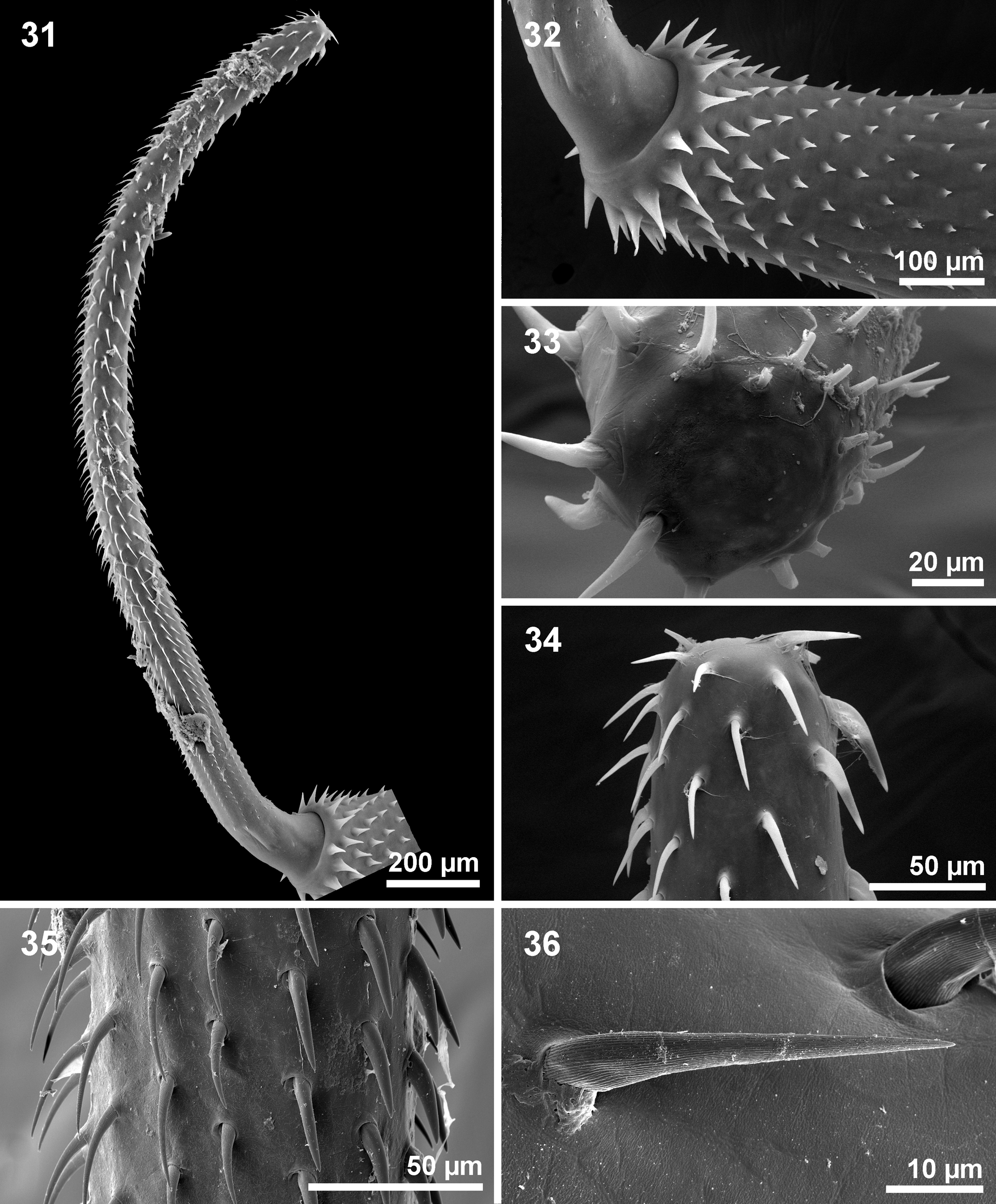
Scanning electron microscopy of proboscis of an Acanthocephala

The Acanthocephala, the thorny-headed worms or spiny-headed worms, are characterized by the presence of an eversible proboscis, armed with spines, which they use to pierce and hold the gut wall of their host.

=== Lepidoptera mouth parts ===
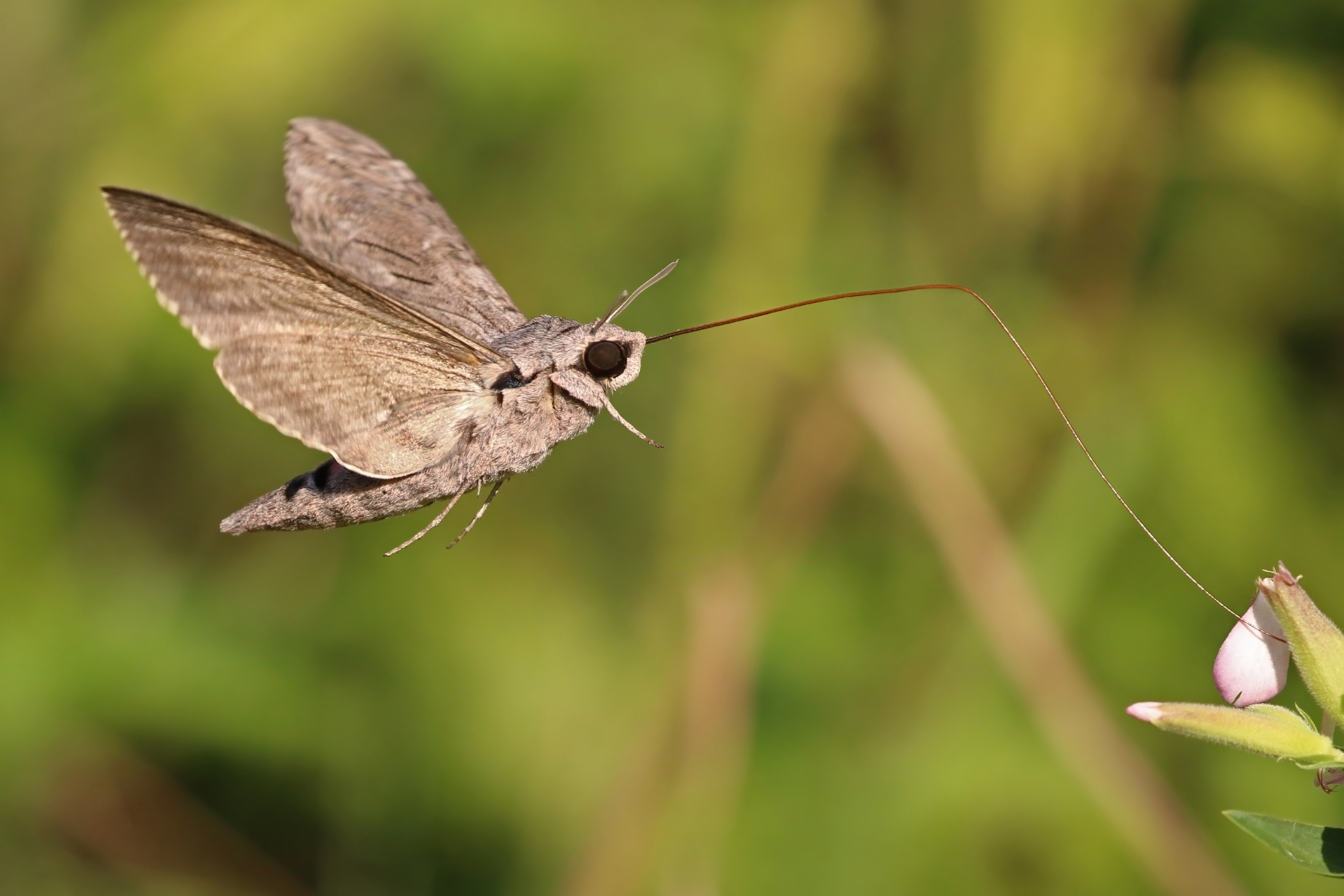
Convolvulus hawk-moth (Agrius convolvuli) feeding with extended proboscis

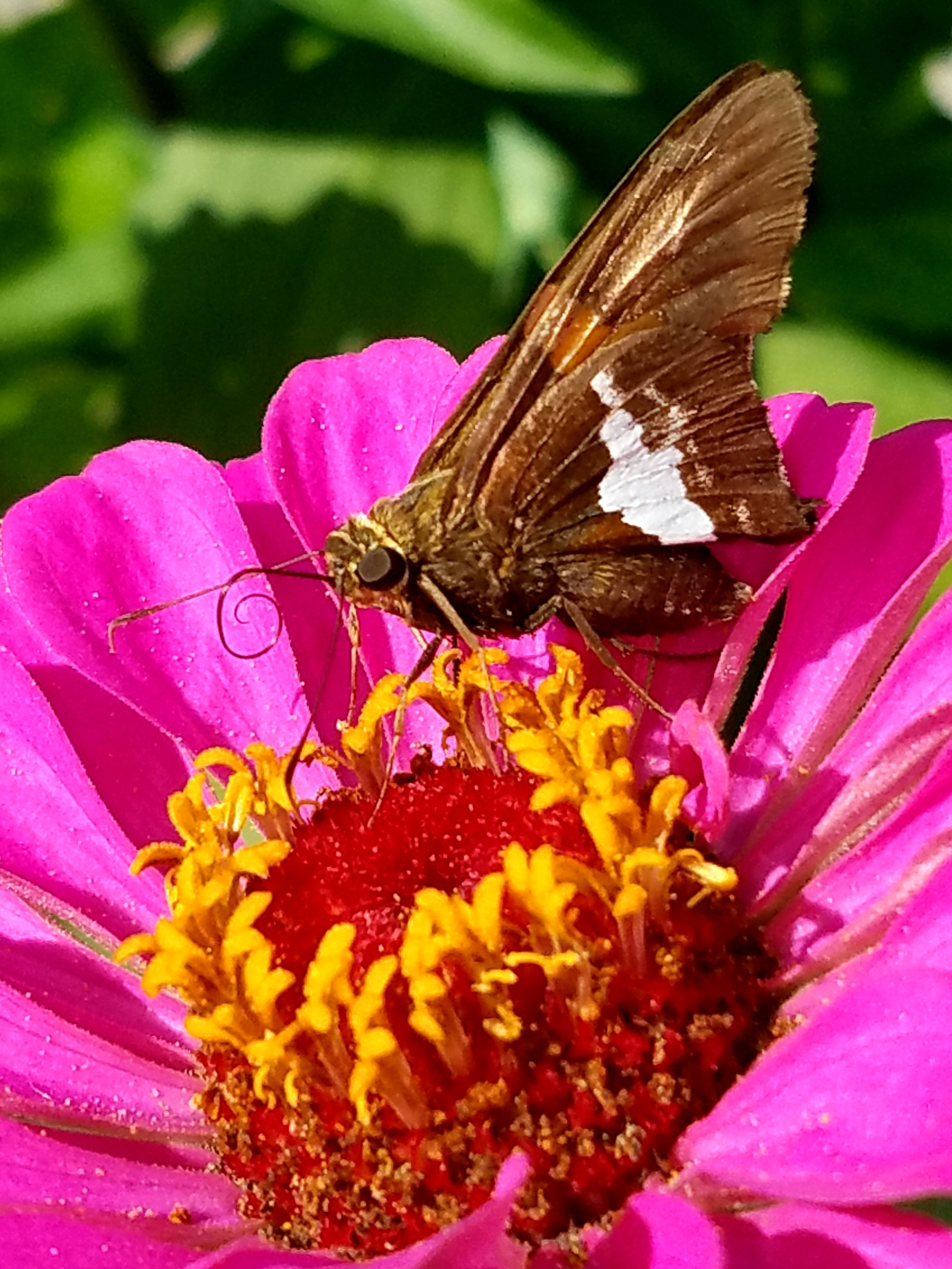
Silver-spotted Skipper (Epargyreus clarus) unfurling its proboscis to feed on Zinnia

The mouth parts of Lepidoptera (butterflies and moths) mainly consist of the sucking kind; this part is known as the proboscis or 'haustellum'. The proboscis consists of two tubes held together by hooks and separable for cleaning. The proboscis contains muscles for operating. Each tube is inwardly concave, thus forming a central tube up which moisture is sucked. Suction takes place due to the contraction and expansion of a sac in the head. During rest, the proboscis remains coiled tightly against the head. When the butterfly moves to feed, it unfurls to extend downward into the flower's center. A specific example of the proboscis being used for feeding is in the species Deilephila elpenor. In this species, the moth hovers in front of the flower and extends its long proboscis to attain its food.

A few Lepidoptera species lack mouth parts and therefore do not feed in the imago. Others, such as the family Micropterigidae, have mouth parts of the chewing kind.

The study of insect mouthparts was helpful for the understanding of the functional mechanism of the proboscis of butterflies (Lepidoptera) to elucidate the evolution of new form-function. The study of the proboscis of butterflies revealed surprising examples of adaptations to different kinds of fluid food, including nectar, plant sap, tree sap, dung and of adaptations to the use of pollen as complementary food in Heliconius butterflies. An extremely long proboscis appears within different groups of flower-visiting insects, but is relatively rare.

=== Gastropods ===
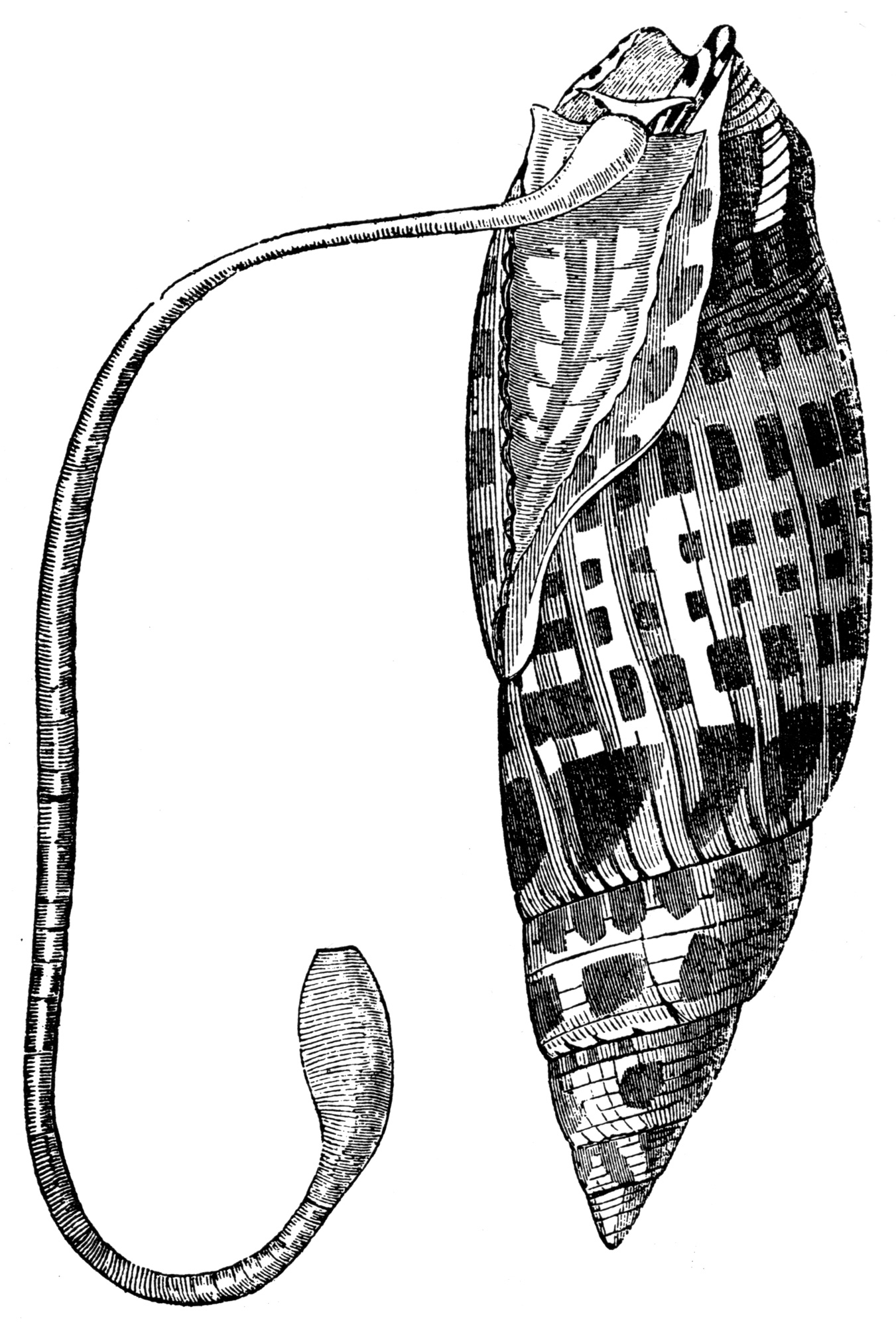
Proboscis of a predatory marine snail Mitra mitra.

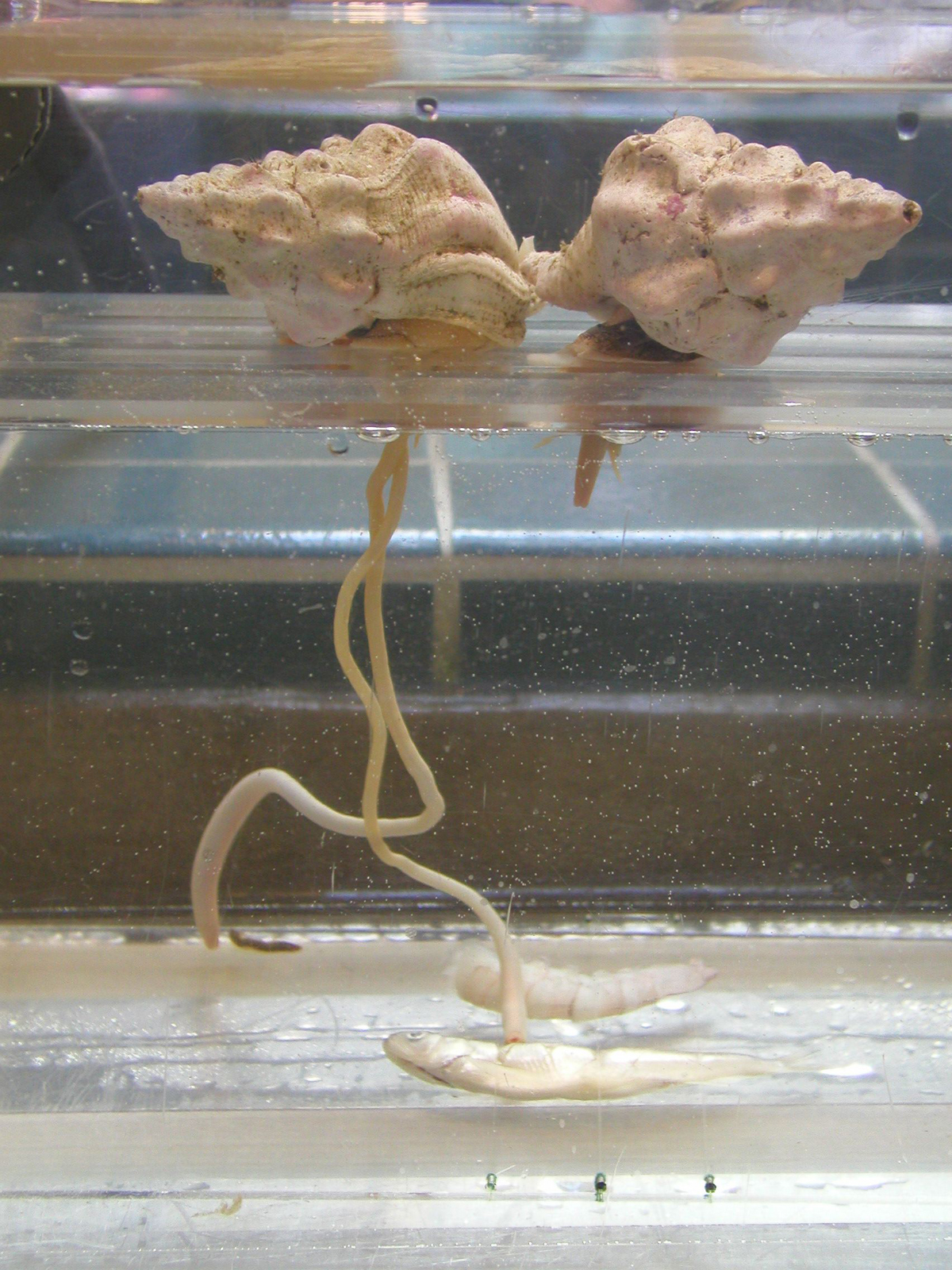
Kellet's whelks feeding on a dead fish using a long, prehensile proboscis.

Some evolutionary lineages of gastropods have evolved a proboscis. In gastropods, the proboscis is an elongation of the snout with the ability to retract inside the body; it can be used for feeding, sensing the environment, and in some cases, capturing prey or attaching to hosts. Three major types of proboscises have been identified: pleurembolic (partially retractable), acrembolic (fully retractable), and intraembolic (variable in structure). Acrembolic proboscises are usually found in parasitic gastropods. The proboscis in gastropods is protruded using hydraulic pressure generated by the wall musculature of the head-foot. It is retracted using specialized proboscis retractor muscles.

== Vertebrates ==
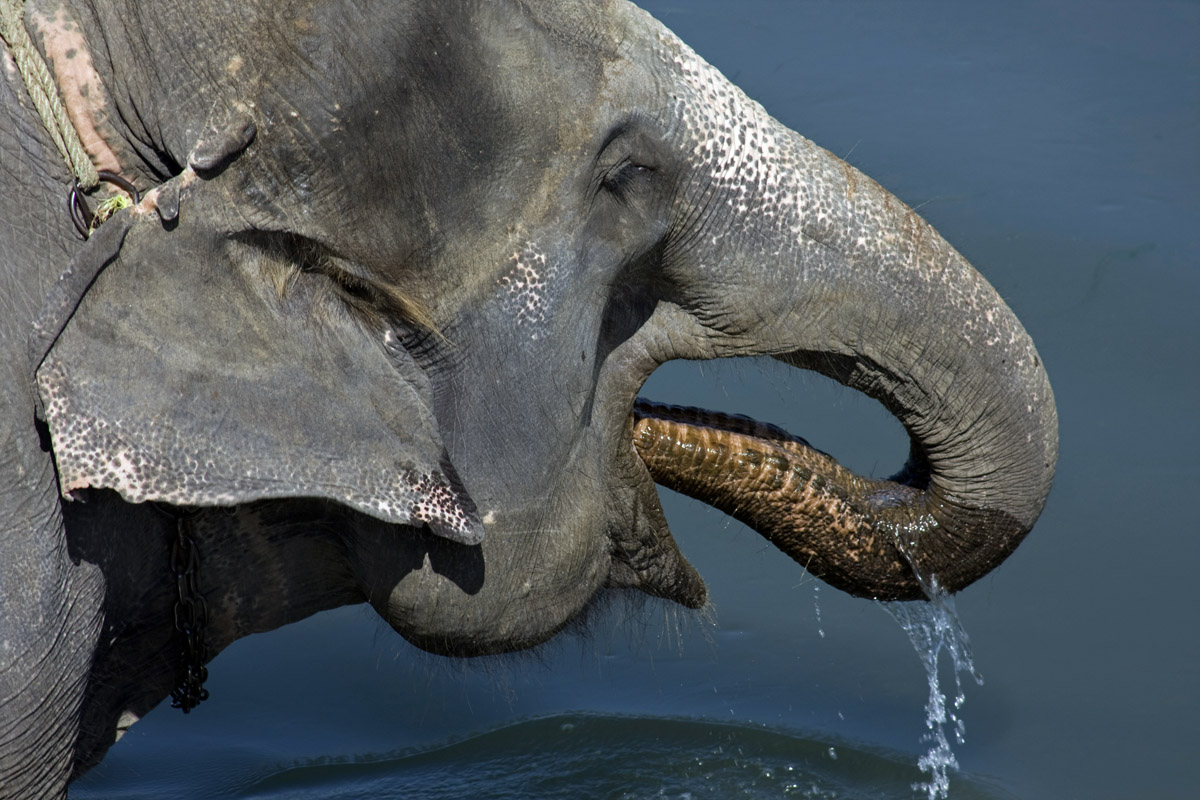
Asian elephant drinking water with trunk

The elephant's trunk and the tapir's elongated nose are called "proboscises", as is the snout of the male elephant seal.

Notable mammals with some form of proboscis are:

- Aardvark
- Anteater
- Elephant
- Elephant shrew
- Hispaniolan solenodon
- Echidna
- Elephant seal
- Leptictidium (extinct)
- Macrauchenia (extinct)
- Moeritherium (extinct)
- Palorchestes (extinct)
- Numbat
- Proboscis monkey
- Saiga antelope
- Members of the tapir family

The proboscis monkey is named for its enormous nose.

The human nose is sometimes ironically called a proboscis, especially when large or prominent.

Notable fishes with some form of proboscis are:

- Elephant fish
- Marlin
- Paddlefish
- Sailfish
- Spearfish
- Swordfish

== See also ==
- Beak – Facial structure found in birds and various other animal clades
- Nostril – Nose orifice that enables the entry and exit of air
- Rostrum (anatomy) – Anatomy term
- Snout – Extended part of an animal's mouth
