= Mitra hectori =

Scientific classification
- Kingdom: Animalia
- Phylum: Mollusca
- Class: Gastropoda
- Subclass: Caenogastropoda
- Order: Neogastropoda
- Superfamily: Mitroidea
- Family: Mitridae
- Subfamily: Mitrinae
- Genus: Mitra
- Species: †M. hectori

Binomial name
- †Mitra hectori Hutton, 1905

Synonyms
- †Euthria mystica Suter, 1917; †Mitra (Fusimitra) hectori (Hutton, 1905)

Extinct species of gastropod

Mitra hectori is an extinct species of sea snail, a marine gastropod mollusk, in the family Mitridae, the miters or miter snails.
