= Mitra subscrobiculata =

Scientific classification
- Kingdom: Animalia
- Phylum: Mollusca
- Class: Gastropoda
- Subclass: Caenogastropoda
- Order: Neogastropoda
- Superfamily: Mitroidea
- Family: Mitridae
- Subfamily: Mitrinae
- Genus: Mitra
- Species: †M. subscrobiculata

Binomial name
- †Mitra subscrobiculata d'Orbigny, 1852

Extinct species of gastropod

Mitra subscrobiculata is an extinct species of sea snail, a marine gastropod mollusk, in the family Mitridae, the miters or miter snails.

== Distribution ==
This species occurs in India.
