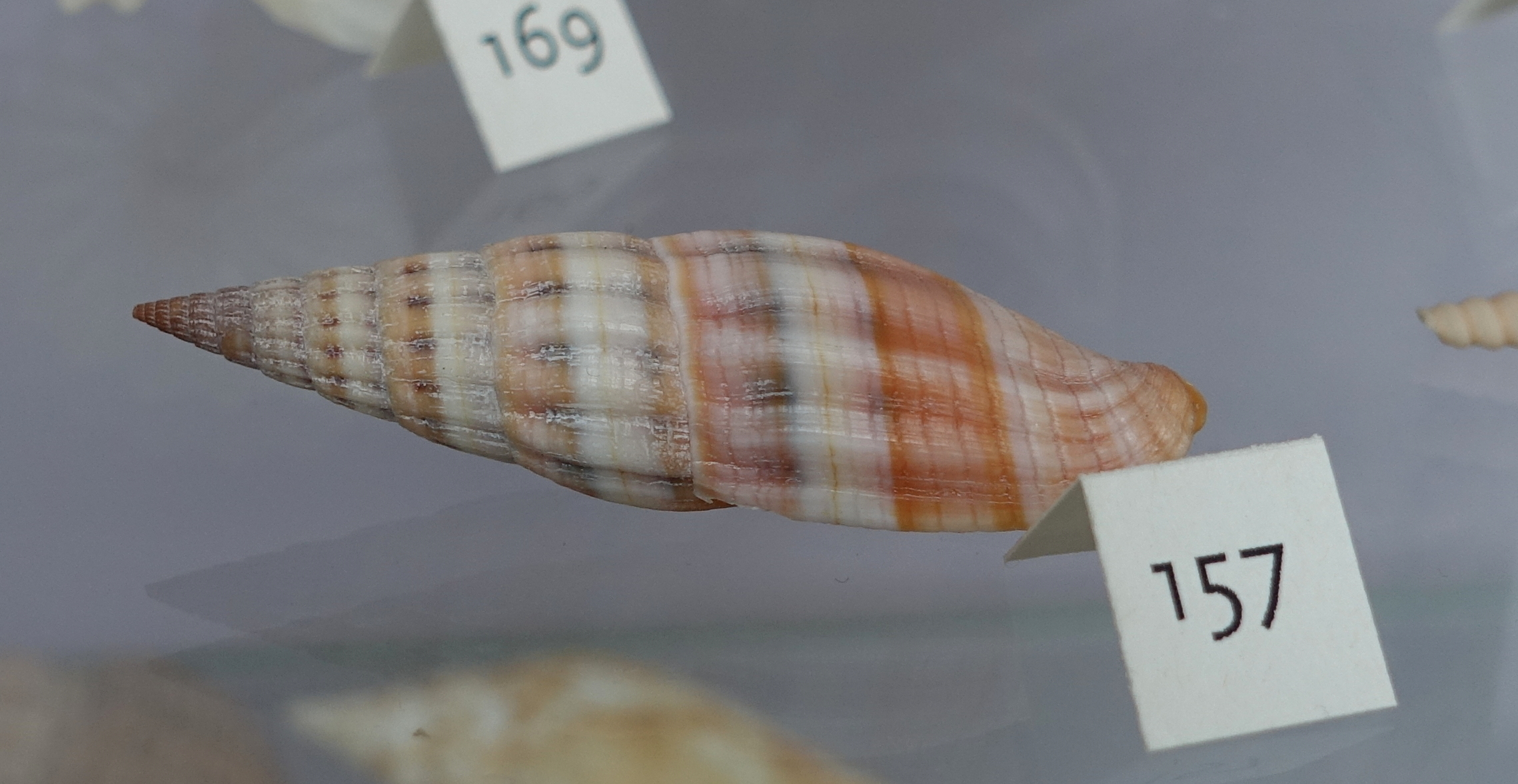
- Shell of Vexillum taylorianum (specimen at Redpath Museum - McGill University - Montreal, Canada)

Scientific classification
- Kingdom: Animalia
- Phylum: Mollusca
- Class: Gastropoda
- Subclass: Caenogastropoda
- Order: Neogastropoda
- Superfamily: Turbinelloidea
- Family: Costellariidae
- Genus: Vexillum
- Species: V. taylorianum

Binomial name
- Vexillum taylorianum (Sowerby II & Sowerby III, 1874)

Synonyms
- Mitra tayloriana G. B. Sowerby II, 1874 (original combination); Vexillum (Vexillum) taylorianum (G. B. Sowerby II, 1874)

= Vexillum taylorianum =

Species of gastropod

Vexillum taylorianum is a species of small sea snail, marine gastropod mollusk in the family Costellariidae, the ribbed miters.

== Description ==
(original description) The mitre-shaped shell is spirally striated. The ribs are close. The whorls are rather convex. The body whorl is rib-banded with orange and brown. In a variety there are red lines between the bands. In the shape of the whorls it resembles Vexillum taeniatum (Lamarck, 1811), but the characters of the ribs and colouring prevent its association with that species.
