= Mitra abbatis =

Scientific classification
- Kingdom: Animalia
- Phylum: Mollusca
- Class: Gastropoda
- Subclass: Caenogastropoda
- Order: Neogastropoda
- Superfamily: Mitroidea
- Family: Mitridae
- Subfamily: Mitrinae
- Genus: Mitra
- Species: M. abbatis

Binomial name
- Mitra abbatis Perry, 1811

Species of gastropod

Mitra abbatis is a species of sea snail, a marine gastropod mollusk, in the family Mitridae, the miters or miter snails.
