= Vexillum paligerum =

Scientific classification
- Kingdom: Animalia
- Phylum: Mollusca
- Class: Gastropoda
- Subclass: Caenogastropoda
- Order: Neogastropoda
- Superfamily: Turbinelloidea
- Family: Costellariidae
- Genus: Vexillum
- Species: V. paligerum

Binomial name
- Vexillum paligerum (Sowerby II & Sowerby III, 1874)

Synonyms
- Mitra paligera G. B. Sowerby II, 1874 (original combination); Vexillum (Pusia) paligerum (G. B. Sowerby II, 1874)

Species of gastropod

Vexillum paligerum is a species of small sea snail, marine gastropod mollusk in the family Costellariidae, the ribbed miters.

This species is considered by the Australian Faunal Directory as a synonym of Vexillum unifascialis (Lamarck, 1811).

== Description ==
The length of the shell attains 9 mm.

The shell is small and rather fusiform. The spire is turreted. The whorls are angular above. The ribs are rather distant, tuberculated at the suture, painted with bands of spots. The body whorl is rostrated below.

== Distribution ==
This marine species occurs off Mauritius and the Philippines.
