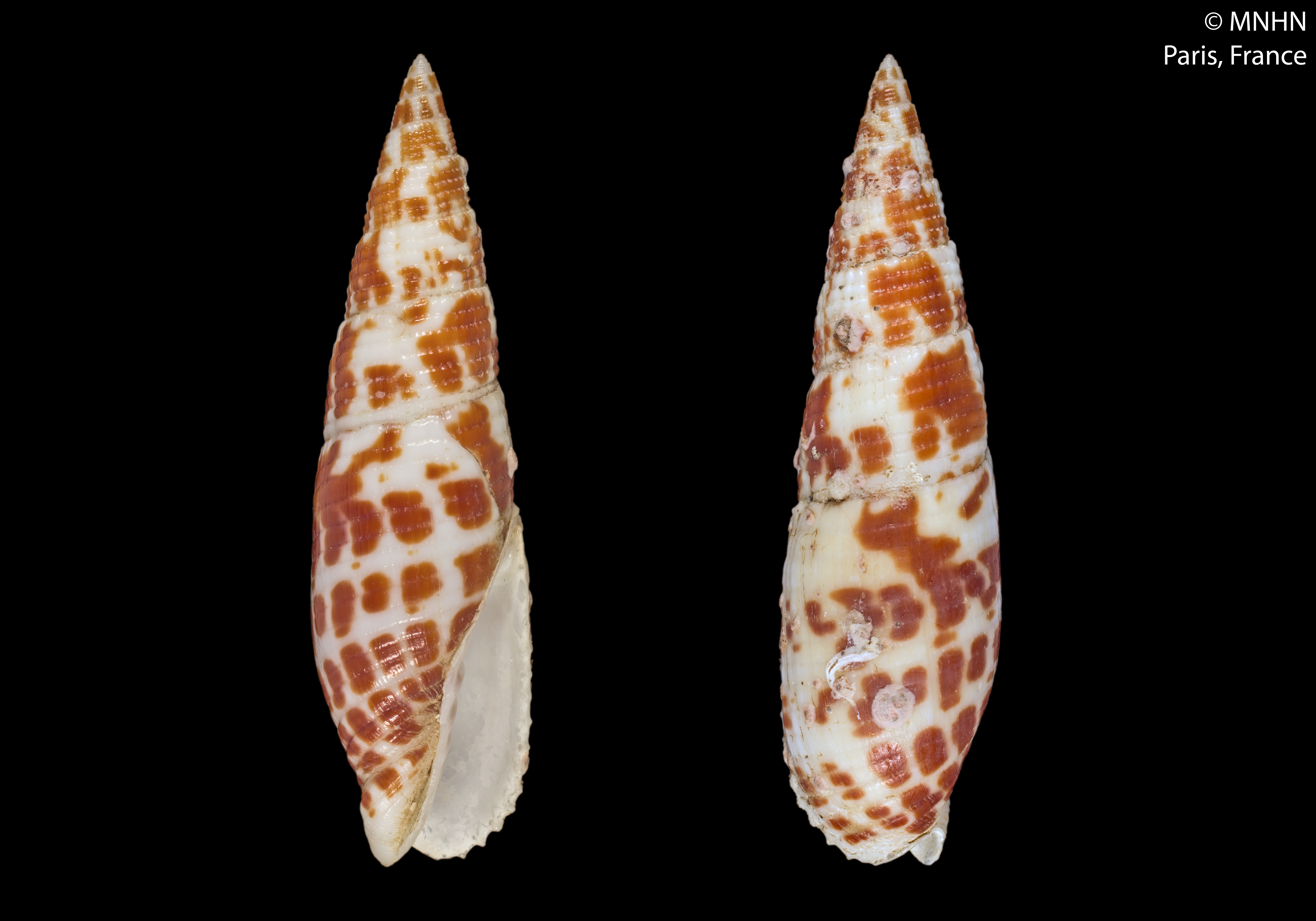
- Shell of Mitra deprofundis (holotype at MNHN, Paris)

Scientific classification
- Kingdom: Animalia
- Phylum: Mollusca
- Class: Gastropoda
- Subclass: Caenogastropoda
- Order: Neogastropoda
- Family: Mitridae
- Genus: Mitra
- Species: M. deprofundis

Binomial name
- Mitra deprofundis Turner, 2001

Synonyms
- Tiarella deprofundis (H. Turner, 2001)

= Mitra deprofundis =

Species of gastropod

Mitra deprofundis is a species of sea snail, a marine gastropod mollusk in the family Mitridae, the miters or miter snails.

== Distribution ==
This marine species occurs off New Caledonia.
