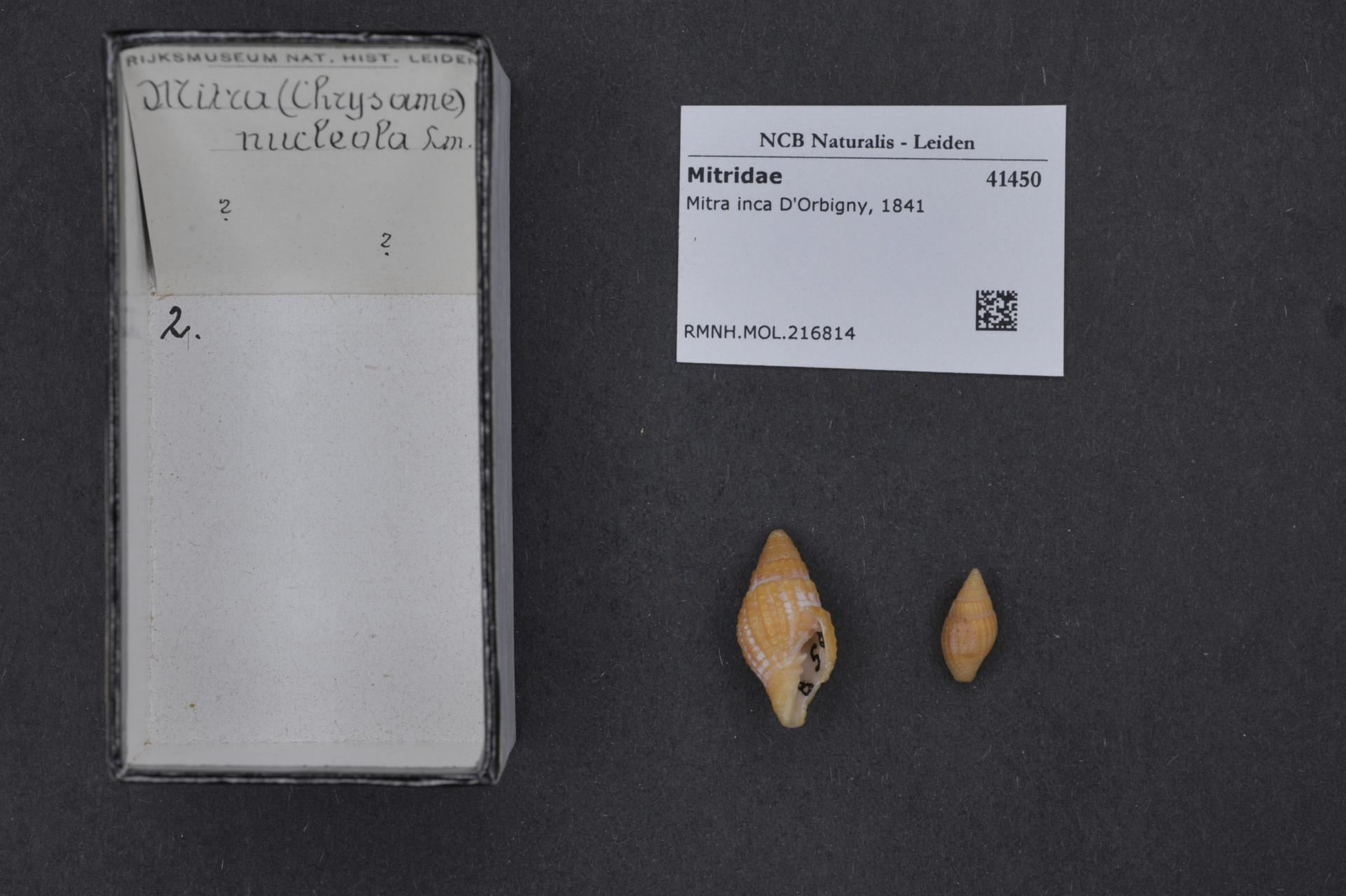

Scientific classification
- Kingdom: Animalia
- Phylum: Mollusca
- Class: Gastropoda
- Subclass: Caenogastropoda
- Order: Neogastropoda
- Family: Mitridae
- Genus: Mitra
- Species: M. inca

Binomial name
- Mitra inca Ordigny, 1842

= Mitra inca =

Species of gastropod

Mitra inca is a species of sea snail, a marine gastropod mollusk in the family Mitridae, the miters or miter snails.
