= Vexillum subtruncatum =

Scientific classification
- Kingdom: Animalia
- Phylum: Mollusca
- Class: Gastropoda
- Subclass: Caenogastropoda
- Order: Neogastropoda
- Superfamily: Turbinelloidea
- Family: Costellariidae
- Genus: Vexillum
- Species: V. subtruncatum

Binomial name
- Vexillum subtruncatum (G. B. Sowerby II, 1874)

Synonyms
- Mitra (Costellaria) subtruncata G.B. Sowerby II, 1874; Vexillum (Costellaria) subtruncatum (G. B. Sowerby II, 1874)

Species of gastropod

Vexillum subtruncatum is a species of sea snail, a marine gastropod mollusk, in the family Costellariidae, the ribbed miters.

== Description ==
(Original description) The pyramidal shell is brown, with a pale band in the middle of the whorls. The shell is closely cancellated, angular at the suture. The body whorl is oblong, anteriorly somewhat truncated, rostrated. In sculpture the shell resembles Vexillum obeliscus, but straight and compressed at the sides, and slightly truncated above the contracted termination.

G.B. Sowerby II remarks that in sculpture this species resembles Vexillum obeliscus (Reeve, 1844). Judging from his figure and the specimens which I believe to belong to this form, this statement requires some qualification. To a certain extent there is some similarity; but the ribs in V. obeliscus are finer and more numerous, and the spiral sulci between them much deeper than in V. subtruncata. The ribs, too, in the former are subgranulous at the points where the spiral lirae between the sulci come into contact with them, whilst in the latter they are smooth and regular. The columella has five plaits, V obeliscus only four.

== Distribution ==
This marine species occurs off Japan.
