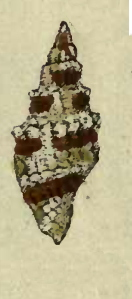
- Shell of Vexillum obtusispinosum

Scientific classification
- Kingdom: Animalia
- Phylum: Mollusca
- Class: Gastropoda
- Subclass: Caenogastropoda
- Order: Neogastropoda
- Superfamily: Turbinelloidea
- Family: Costellariidae
- Genus: Vexillum
- Species: V. obtusispinosum

Binomial name
- Vexillum obtusispinosum (G.B. Sowerby II, 1874)

Synonyms
- Mitra obtusispinosa G. B. Sowerby II, 1874 ·

= Vexillum obtusispinosum =

Species of gastropod

Vexillum obtusispinosum is a species of sea snail, a marine gastropod mollusk, in the family Costellariidae, the ribbed miters.

== Description ==
The length of the shell attains 29.3 mm.

(Original description) The subfusiform shell is yellowish, clouded with salmon and red. It is armed with rather distant ribs, bluntly spinose at the angle, with two tubercles in the middle, and spiral striae. The spire is turreted. The body whorl is ventricose to the middle, contracted anteriorly.

== Distribution ==
This marine species occurs off Guam.
