= Vexillum longispira =

Scientific classification
- Kingdom: Animalia
- Phylum: Mollusca
- Class: Gastropoda
- Subclass: Caenogastropoda
- Order: Neogastropoda
- Superfamily: Turbinelloidea
- Family: Costellariidae
- Genus: Vexillum
- Species: V. longispira

Binomial name
- Vexillum longispira (G. B. Sowerby II, 1874)

Synonyms
- Mitra longispira G. B. Sowerby II, 1874

Species of gastropod

Vexillum longispira is a species of sea snail, a marine gastropod mollusk, in the family Costellariidae, the ribbed miters.

The Australian Faunal Directory considers Mitra longispira a synonym of Vexillum (Costellaria) radius (Reeve, 1845).

== Description ==
The thin shell is slender. It is fawn-coloured, encircled with a white band in the middle of the whorls. The shell is sculptured with angular, elegantly curved ribs and spiral striae. The turreted spire is attenuated with numerous whorls. The body whorl is attenuated in front.
