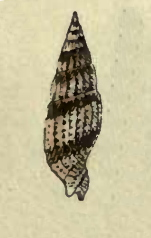
- Drawing of a shell of Vexillum macandrewi

Scientific classification
- Kingdom: Animalia
- Phylum: Mollusca
- Class: Gastropoda
- Subclass: Caenogastropoda
- Order: Neogastropoda
- Family: Costellariidae
- Genus: Vexillum
- Species: V. macandrewi

Binomial name
- Vexillum macandrewi (G.B. Sowerby II, 1874)

Synonyms
- Mitra macandrewi G. B. Sowerby II, 1874 · unaccepted (original combination); Turricula macandrewi (G. B. Sowerby II, 1874); Vexillum (Costellaria) macandrewi (G. B. Sowerby II, 1874)

= Vexillum macandrewi =

Species of gastropod

Vexillum macandrewi is a species of small sea snail, marine gastropod mollusk in the family Costellariidae, the ribbed miters.

== Description ==
The length of the shell varies between 19 mm and 33 mm.

(Original description) A pretty graceful, thin, fawn-coloured shell, with spiral striae and elegantly curved longitudinal thin ribs.

The shell has a fawn color, lighter on the periphery.

== Distribution ==
This marine species occurs off South Africa, Mozambique; in the Red Sea and the Philippines.
