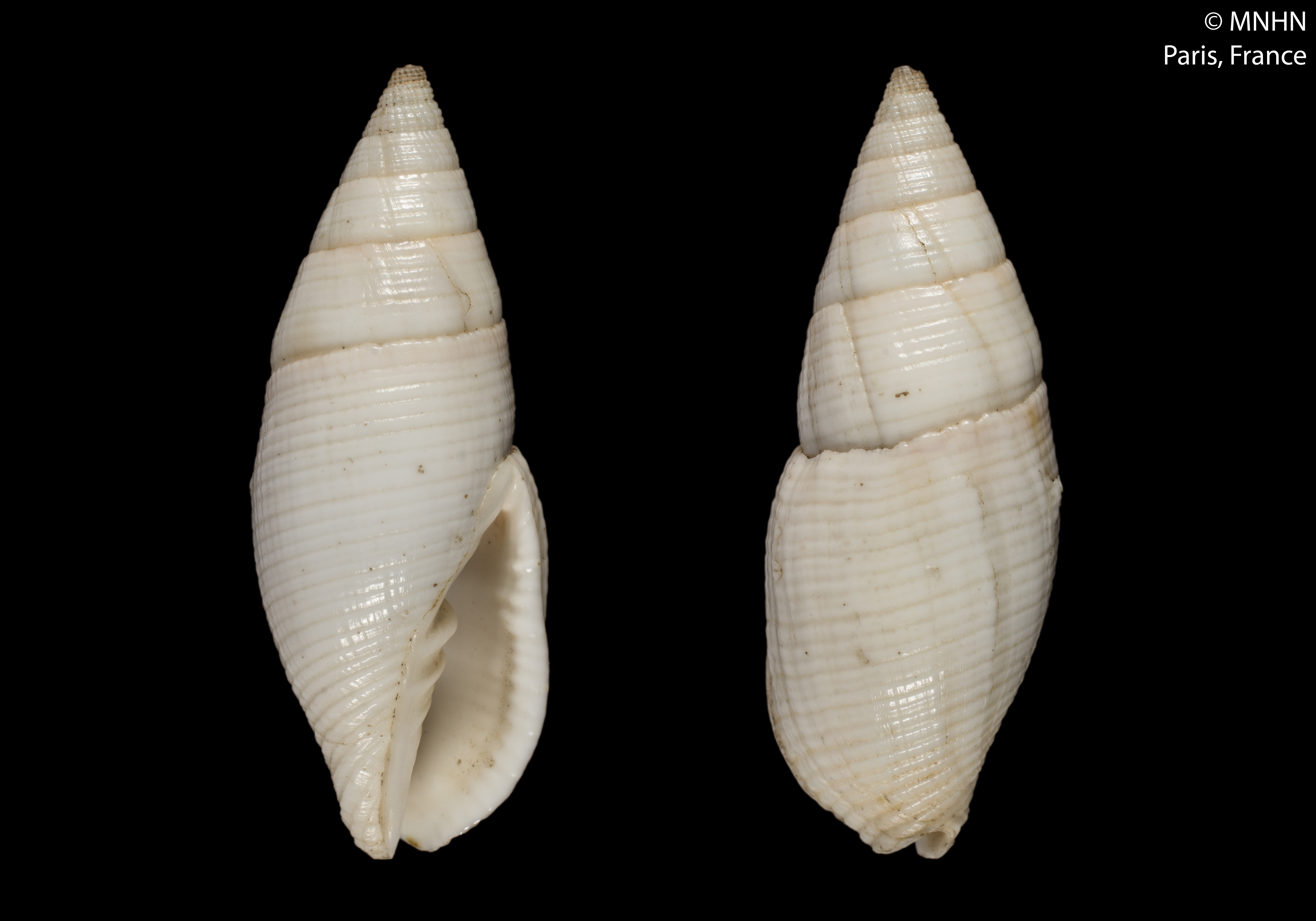
- Shell of Nebularia pellisserpentis (specimen at MNHN, Paris)

Scientific classification
- Kingdom: Animalia
- Phylum: Mollusca
- Class: Gastropoda
- Subclass: Caenogastropoda
- Order: Neogastropoda
- Family: Mitridae
- Subfamily: Cylindromitrinae
- Genus: Nebularia
- Species: N. pellisserpentis

Binomial name
- Nebularia pellisserpentis Reeve, 1844

Synonyms
- Mitra (Strigatella) pellisserpentis Reeve, 1844; Mitra (Strigatella) pellisserpentis pellisserpentis Reeve, 1844; Mitra brumalis Reeve, 1845; Mitra crenilabris A. Adams, 1853; Mitra cretacea G. B. Sowerby II, 1874 (junior homonym of Mitra cretacea Gabb, 1864); Mitra dealbata A. Adams, 1853; Mitra granata Reeve, 1845; Mitra grelloisi Récluz, 1853; Mitra impressa Anton, 1838 (declared by Cernohorsky to be a nomen oblitum); Mitra microstoma G. B. Sowerby II, 1874; Mitra nassoides G. B. Sowerby II, 1874 (junior homonym of Mitra nassoides Grateloup, 1847); Mitra pellisserpentis Reeve, 1844; Mitra serotina A. Adams, 1853; Mitra uzielliana Crosse, 1861; Strigatella pellisserpentis (Reeve, 1844)

= Nebularia pellisserpentis =

Species of gastropod

Nebularia pellisserpentis is a species of sea snail, a marine gastropod mollusc in the family Mitridae, the miters or miter snails.

== Description ==
The white shell is narrow and subcylindrical. It is decussated with longitudinal striae and slight spiral sulci. The aperture is as long as the spire. The outer lip is finely crenulated within, sinuously produced in the middle, acutely toothed. The whorls are banded with brown above and compressed at the sides.

(Described as Mitra nassoides) The thick shell is pale yellowish, oblong-subgibbose, subcancellated with rather unequal crenated longitudinal ribs and spiral undulated ridges nodose upon the ribs. The aperture equals the spire in length and is sinuously contracted. The outer lip is toothed, acuminated above the middle, angular below the middle, acuminated in front.

== Distribution ==
The holotype of this marine species was found off the Philippines.
