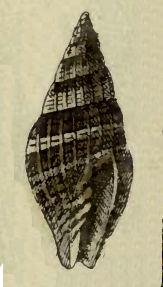
- Drawing of a shell of Vexillum oniscinum

Scientific classification
- Kingdom: Animalia
- Phylum: Mollusca
- Class: Gastropoda
- Subclass: Caenogastropoda
- Order: Neogastropoda
- Family: Costellariidae
- Genus: Vexillum
- Species: V. oniscinum

Binomial name
- Vexillum oniscinum (Lamarck, 1811)

Synonyms
- Mitra oniscina Lamarck, 1811; Mitra (Pusia) glandiformis L.A. Reeve, 1845; Pusia oniscinum (Lamarck, 1811); Vexillum glandiformis (L.A. Reeve, 1845); Vexillum (Pusia) oniscinum (Lamarck, 1811) ·

= Vexillum oniscinum =

Species of gastropod

Vexillum oniscinum is a species of small sea snail, marine gastropod mollusk in the family Costellariidae, the ribbed miters.

== Description ==
The shell is chocolate-brown, with a superior white band, and an inferior one less distinct.

== Distribution ==
This marine species occurs off Mauritius and the Fiji Islands.
