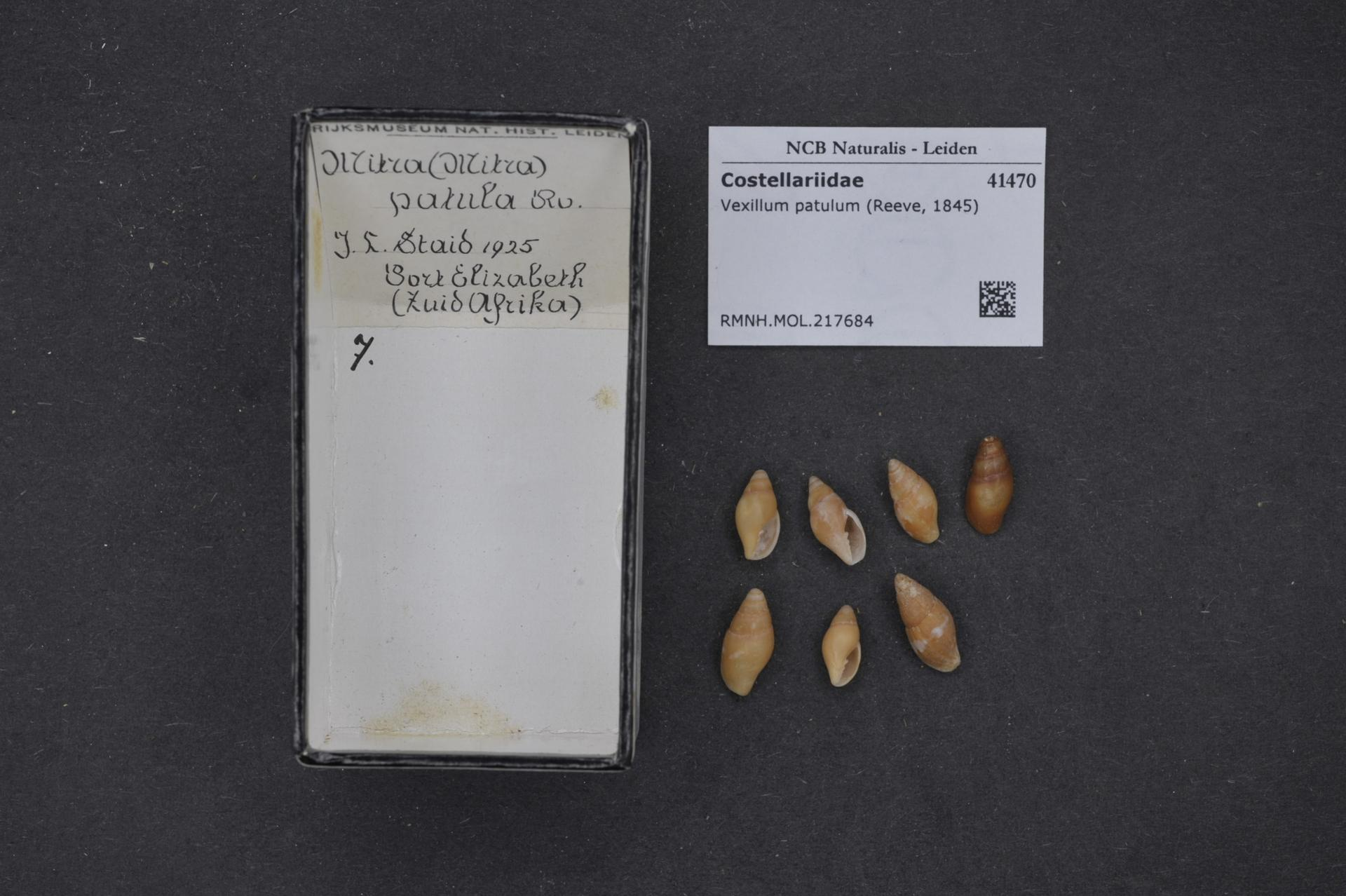
- Shells of Vexillum patulum (specimen at Naturalis Biodiversity Center)

Scientific classification
- Kingdom: Animalia
- Phylum: Mollusca
- Class: Gastropoda
- Subclass: Caenogastropoda
- Order: Neogastropoda
- Superfamily: Turbinelloidea
- Family: Costellariidae
- Genus: Vexillum
- Species: V. patulum

Binomial name
- Vexillum patulum (Reeve, 1845)

Synonyms
- Mitra lurida W. H. Turton, 1932 (junior synonym); Mitra merula G. B. Sowerby III, 1889; Mitra patula Reeve, 1845 (original combination); Mitra simplex Dunker, 1846 (junior synonym); Mitra simplex var. alfredensis W. H. Turton, 1932 (junior synonym); Pusia patula (Reeve, 1845); Vexillum alfredensis (L.A. Reeve, 1845); Vexillum fidis (L.A. Reeve, 1845); Vexillum lurida (L.A. Reeve, 1845); Vexillum simplex (L.A. Reeve, 1845); Vexillum (Pusia) patulum (Reeve, 1845)

= Vexillum patulum =

Species of gastropod

Vexillum patulum, common name the wide-mouth mitre, is a species of small sea snail, marine gastropod mollusk in the family Costellariidae, the ribbed miters.

== Description ==
The length of the shell attains 18 mm.

(Original description) The ovate shell is rather thin, slightly ventricose, smooth. It is ash-coloured, variegated and clouded here and there with brown. The columella is four-plaited. The aperture is large. The outer lip is thin and sinuated at the upper part.

== Distribution ==
This marine species occurs off South Africa.
