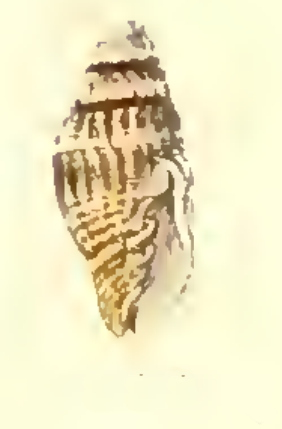
- Image of Vexillum cithara (holotype)

Scientific classification
- Kingdom: Animalia
- Phylum: Mollusca
- Class: Gastropoda
- Subclass: Caenogastropoda
- Order: Neogastropoda
- Superfamily: Turbinelloidea
- Family: Costellariidae
- Genus: Vexillum
- Species: V. cithara

Binomial name
- Vexillum cithara (Reeve, 1845)

Synonyms
- Mitra (Costellaria) georgii Melvill & Sykes, 1899 junior subjective synonym; Mitra arracanensis Sowerby II & Sowerby III, 1874; Mitra cithara Reeve, 1845; Vexillum (Pusia) cithara (Reeve, 1845) · unaccepted; Vexillum arracanense (G. B. Sowerby II, 1874)

= Vexillum cithara =

Species of gastropod

Vexillum cithara, common name the harp mitre, is a species of small sea snail, marine gastropod mollusk in the family Costellariidae, the ribbed miters.

== Description ==
The length of the shell attains 13 mm.

(Original description)The ovate shell is rather thick. The sutures are impressed. The shell is longitudinally very closely ribbed with narrow ribs. The shell is obtuse. The interstices are transversely latticed. The shell has a purple lead-colour, encircled with a narrow pale zone. The columella is four-plaited.

(Described as Mitra arracanensis) The rather short shell is brown, smooth, girt with a white line above the middle. The ribs are rather distant, thin, whitish. The spire is obtuse. The body whorl is oblong, beaded below at the end of the ribs. The aperture is rather short, contracted in the middle, roundly expanded below the middle, narrow at the end.

== Distribution ==
This marine species occurs off the Solomon Islands.
