= Vexillum intertaeniatum =

Scientific classification
- Kingdom: Animalia
- Phylum: Mollusca
- Class: Gastropoda
- Subclass: Caenogastropoda
- Order: Neogastropoda
- Superfamily: Turbinelloidea
- Family: Costellariidae
- Genus: Vexillum
- Species: V. intertaeniatum

Binomial name
- Vexillum intertaeniatum (G.B. Sowerby II, 1874)

Synonyms
- Costellaria intertaeniatum (G.B. II Sowerby, 1874); Costellaria michaui intertaeniatum G.B. II Sowerby, 1874; Mitra intertaeniata G. B. Sowerby II, 1874 (original combination); Mitra laevicostata G. B. Sowerby II, 1874; Turricula pulchra Garrett, 1880; Vexillum (Costellaria) intertaeniatum (G. B. Sowerby II, 1874); Vexillum laevicostatum (G. B. Sowerby II, 1874); Vexillum (Costellaria) intertaeniata (G.B. Sowerby II, 1874)

Species of gastropod

Vexillum intertaeniatum is a species of small sea snail, marine gastropod mollusk in the family Costellariidae, the ribbed miters.

== Description ==
The length of the shell varies between 12 mm and 17 mm.

(Described as Turricula pulchra) The acuminately turreted shell is solid, subfusiform, slightly shining, contracted and obliquely grooved towards the base, which is somewhat twisted. The shell contains whorls 9-11 whorls, nearly flat, angularly shouldered, longitudinally plicately-costate. The ribs are smooth, 12 to 14 on the body. The interstices show fine longitudinal striae, with or without transverse impressed lines. The columella is four-plaited. The aperture is about two-fifths the length of the shell. The color is variable; whitish, bluish-white, ashy-blue, ashy-green, brown with pale ribs, and generally with four or five transverse fillets of small alternately orange-yellow and brown spots. Some of the dark examples have a whitish spiral line and the articulated fillets are nearly obsolete. The aperture and the columella are brownish with a pale zone above.

== Distribution ==
This marine species occurs off the Philippines and in the Western and Central Pacific; also off Queensland, Australia.
