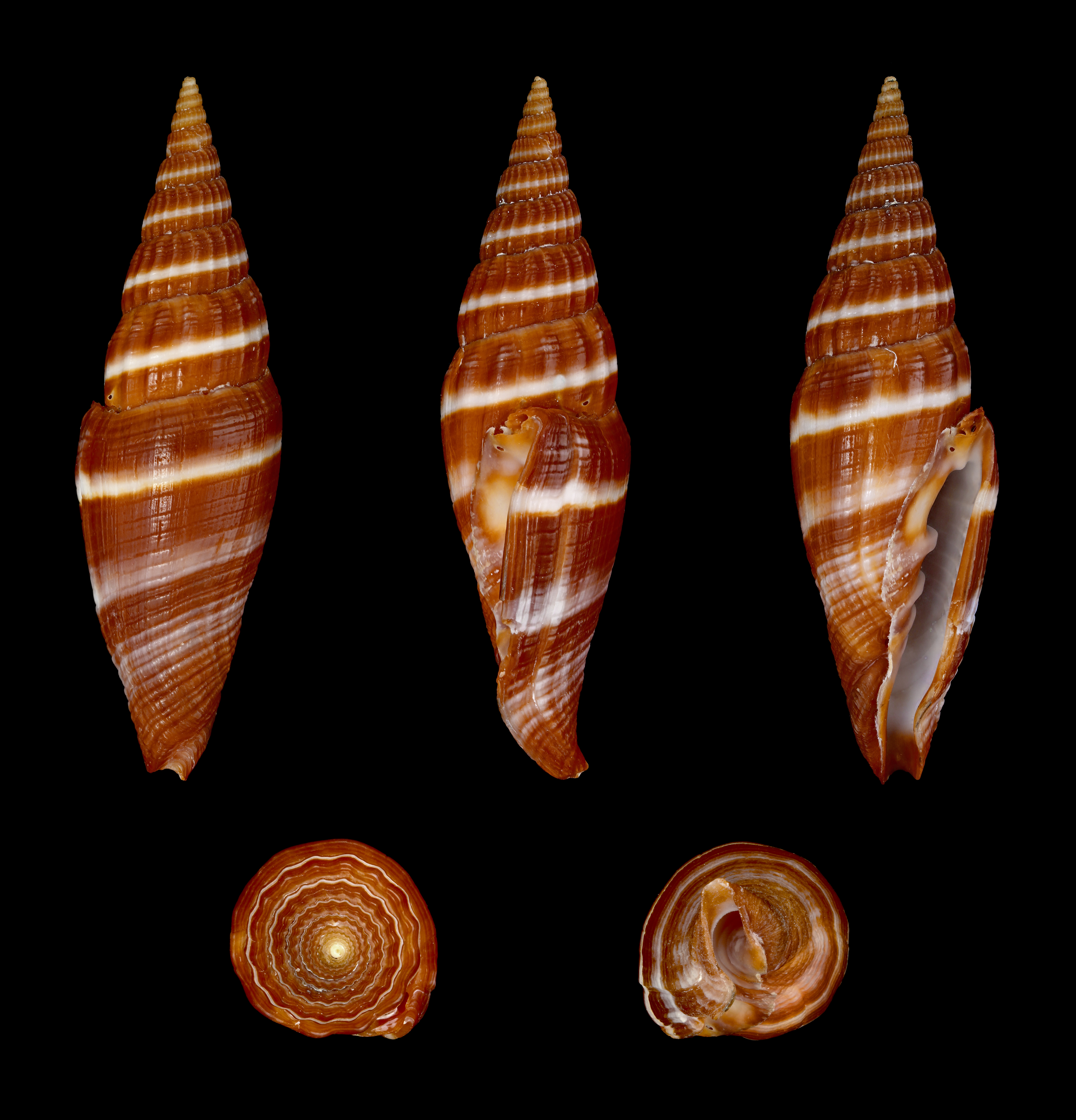
- Shell of Vexillum caffrum

Scientific classification
- Kingdom: Animalia
- Phylum: Mollusca
- Class: Gastropoda
- Subclass: Caenogastropoda
- Order: Neogastropoda
- Superfamily: Turbinelloidea
- Family: Costellariidae
- Genus: Vexillum
- Species: V. caffrum

Binomial name
- Vexillum caffrum (Linnaeus, 1758)

Synonyms
- Mitra zonalis Quoy & Gaimard, 1833; Vexillum (Vexillum) caffrum (Linnaeus, 1758); Voluta caffra Linnaeus, 1758 (original combination)

= Vexillum caffrum =

Species of gastropod

Vexillum caffrum is a species of sea snail, a marine gastropod mollusk, in the family Costellariidae, the ribbed miters.

== Description ==
The length of the shell varies between 35 mm and 51 mm.

The fusiform shell has a high spire and an adpressed suture. It shows many axial riblets, becoming obsolete on the middle of the body whorl. The outer lip is lirate, a little concave and inverted. The interior of the lip edge is dark brown. The columella has four plaits. The short siphonal canal is open and a little recurved.

The shell is dark chocolate brown, with two or three yellow spiral zones, the upper one visible on the spire.

== Distribution ==
The species is found in the Tropîcal Pacific Ocean from Indonesia to Polynesia, and off Australia (Queensland).
