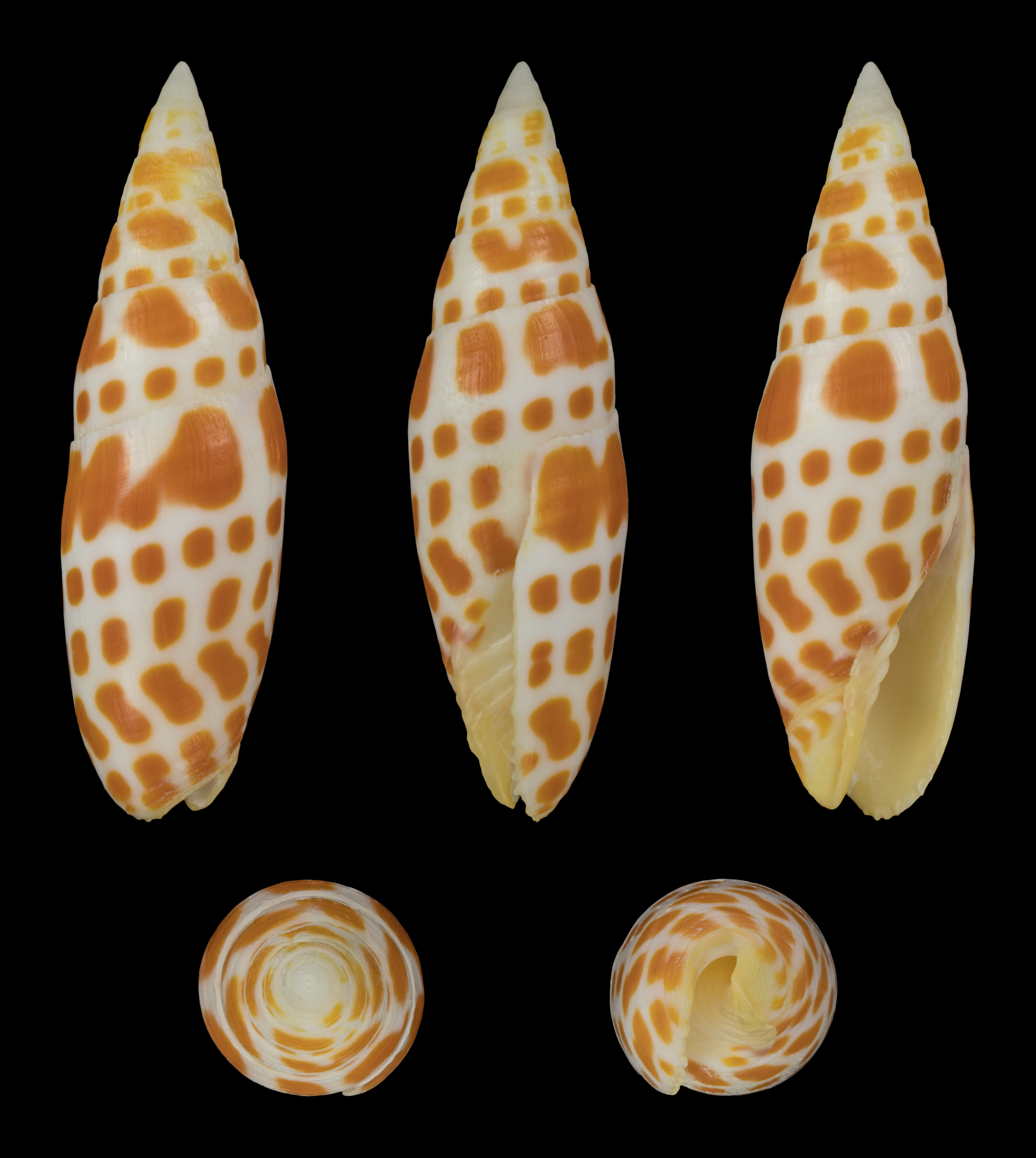
- A Mitra mitra shell

Scientific classification
- Kingdom: Animalia
- Phylum: Mollusca
- Class: Gastropoda
- Subclass: Caenogastropoda
- Order: Neogastropoda
- Family: Mitridae
- Genus: Mitra
- Species: M. mitra

Binomial name
- Mitra mitra (Linnaeus, 1758)

Synonyms
- Mitra (Mitra) magnifica Poppe & Tagaro, 2006 · alternative representation; Mitra (Mitra) mitra (Linnaeus, 1758); Mitra carmelita (Röding, 1798); Mitra episcopalis (Linnaeus, 1758); Mitra episcopalis (G. Perry, 1811); Mitra magnifica Poppe & Tagaro, 2006 junior subjective synonym; Voluta mitra Linnaeus, 1758 (original combination); Voluta mitra episcopalis Linnaeus, 1758 (suppressed by ICZN Opinion 885)

= Mitra mitra =

Species of gastropod

Mitra mitra, common name the episcopal miter, is a species of large predatory sea snail, a marine gastropod mollusk in the family Mitridae, the miters.

== Distribution ==
Widespread in the Indo-Pacific, from East Africa, including Madagascar and the Red Sea, to eastern Polynesia. North to southern Japan, Wake Island and Hawaii, and south to Australia.

== Habitat ==
This species lives in intertidal and sublittoral zones, to a depth of around 80 m.

== Feeding ==
Mitra mitra is known to be carnivorous, an active predator that feeds on smaller gastropods and bivalves.

== Shell description ==
The maximum shell length for this species is 18 cm, usually to 14 cm. Like in all Mitridae, the shell is elongate, somewhat fusiform, with a high spire. The aperture is elongate and narrow, and the outer lip is smooth and not lirate (grooved). Unlike other species of the genus Mitra, the spire is not strongly shouldered. The surface of the shell is smooth, with a few weak, spiral grooves towards the anterior end. The colour is white, with spiral rows of large irregular orange or red spots.
