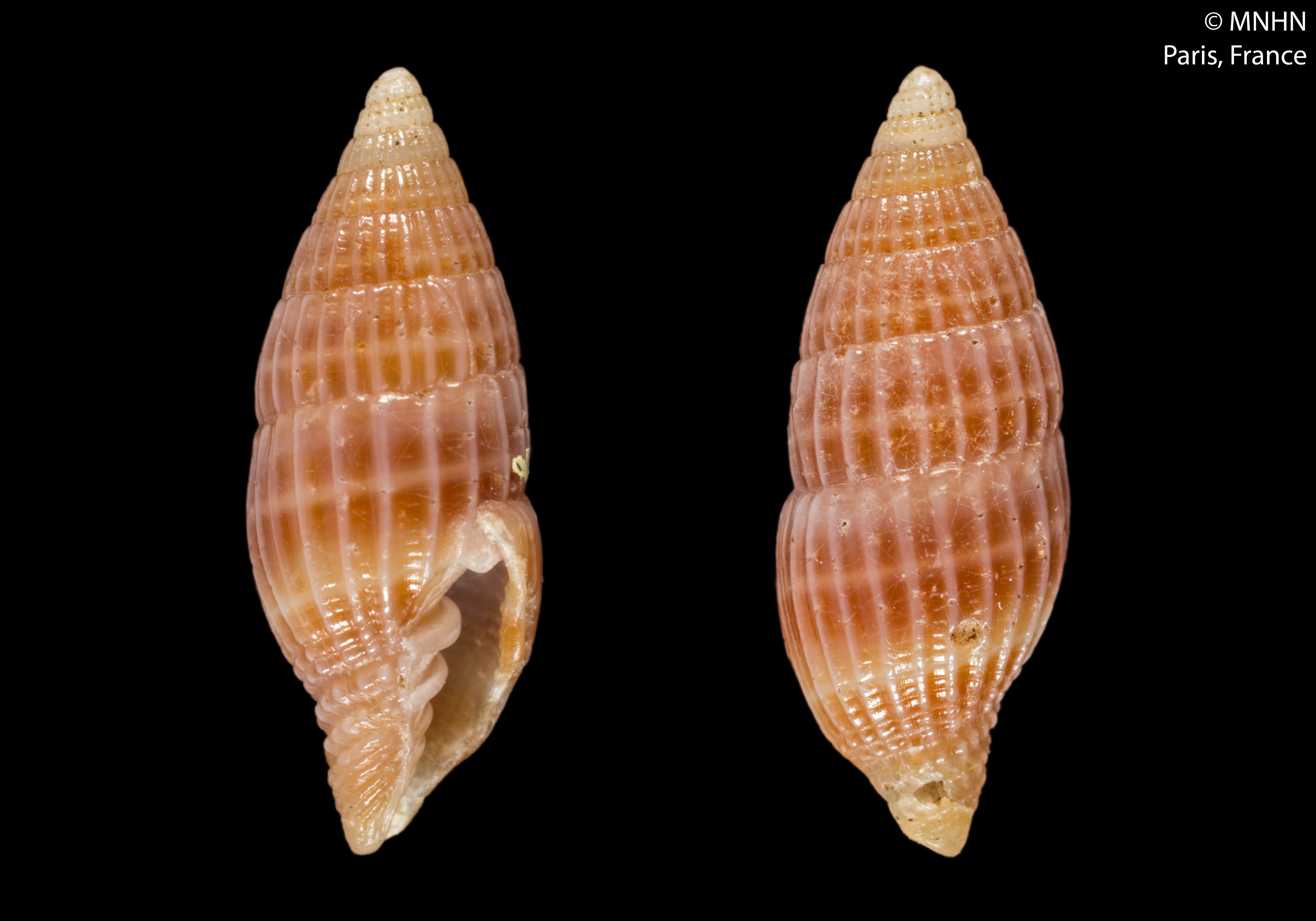
- Shell of Vexillum fortiplicatum (lectotype at MNHN, Paris)

Scientific classification
- Kingdom: Animalia
- Phylum: Mollusca
- Class: Gastropoda
- Subclass: Caenogastropoda
- Order: Neogastropoda
- Superfamily: Turbinelloidea
- Family: Costellariidae
- Genus: Vexillum
- Species: V. fortiplicatum

Binomial name
- Vexillum fortiplicatum (Pease, 1868)

Synonyms
- Mitra aubryana Hervier, 1897; Mitra (Pusia) aubryana Hervier, 1897; Turricula (Costellaria) fortiplicata Pease, 1868 (basionym); Turricula fortiplicata Pease, 1868 (original combination); Vexillum (Pusia) fortiplicatum (Pease, 1868); Vexillum kewaloensis J. Cate, 1963

= Vexillum fortiplicatum =

Species of gastropod

Vexillum fortiplicatum is a species of small sea snail, marine gastropod mollusk in the family Costellariidae, the ribbed miters.

== Description ==
The length of the shell varies between 8 mm and 12 mm.

The shell is light chestnut, base and apex whitish.

The fusiform shell is attenuated at both ends. It is longitudinally strongly plicately ribbed with the interstices grooved transversely. The spire is granulose. The base is slightly recurved and granosely ribbed transversely. The outer lip is lirate within. The columella is three-plaited, with a callosity at the top. The plaits are prominent and large. The shell is yellowish-chestnut, the lower half of the body whorl and the apex are white.

== Distribution ==
This marine species occurs off the Tuamotu Islands and off the Marianas Islands to New Caledonia, off the Hawaiian Islands.
