= Vexillum filistriatum =

Scientific classification
- Kingdom: Animalia
- Phylum: Mollusca
- Class: Gastropoda
- Subclass: Caenogastropoda
- Order: Neogastropoda
- Superfamily: Turbinelloidea
- Family: Costellariidae
- Genus: Vexillum
- Species: V. filistriatum

Binomial name
- Vexillum filistriatum (Sowerby II & Sowerby III, 1874)

Synonyms
- Mitra filistriata G. B. Sowerby II, 1874 (original combination); Vexillum (Costellaria) filistriatum (G. B. Sowerby II, 1874)

Species of gastropod

Vexillum filistriatum is a species of small sea snail, marine gastropod mollusk in the family Costellariidae, the ribbed miters.

== Description ==
The length of the shell varies between 14 mm and 19 mm.

(Original description) The narrow shell is pyramidal, finely decussated and fulvous. It is ornamented at the lower part of the whorl with pale brown flames, encircled with a spiral impressed line near the suture. The spire is attenuated. The body whorl is short and elegantly fusiform.

== Distribution ==
This marine species occurs off Mauritius, the Philippines, Polynesia and Hawaii.
