= Vexillum salmoneum =

Scientific classification
- Kingdom: Animalia
- Phylum: Mollusca
- Class: Gastropoda
- Subclass: Caenogastropoda
- Order: Neogastropoda
- Superfamily: Turbinelloidea
- Family: Costellariidae
- Genus: Vexillum
- Species: V. salmoneum

Binomial name
- Vexillum salmoneum (G. B. Sowerby II, 1874)

Synonyms
- Mitra salmonea G. B. Sowerby II, 1874 ·

Species of gastropod

Vexillum salmoneum is a species of small sea snail, marine gastropod mollusk in the family Costellariidae, the ribbed miters.

== Description ==
(Original description) The shell is fusiform. It is yellowish, clouded with a salmon tint. The spire is acuminated. The whorls are rather convex, closely ribbed. The body whorl is angular above, armed with oblique interstriated ribs and with tubercles at the angle, anteriorly attenuated, acuminated. The aperture is striated within.
