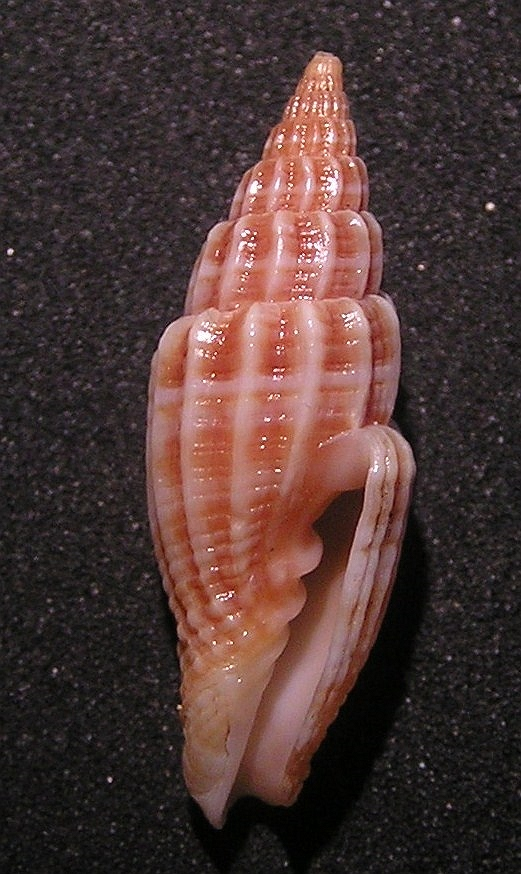
- Vexillum suluense

Scientific classification
- Kingdom: Animalia
- Phylum: Mollusca
- Class: Gastropoda
- Subclass: Caenogastropoda
- Order: Neogastropoda
- Superfamily: Turbinelloidea
- Family: Costellariidae
- Genus: Vexillum
- Species: V. suluense

Binomial name
- Vexillum suluense (Adams & Reeve, 1850)

Synonyms
- Mitra exquisita Sowerby, G.B. (3rd) 1889 (not Garrett, 1873); Mitra rectilateralis Sowerby, G.B. II & III, 1874; Mitra suluensis A. Adams & Reeve, 1850 superseded combination; Mitra (Vulpecula) tomlini Melvill, J.C., 1925 (not W. H. Turton, 1933); Turricula rectilateralis (G. B. Sowerby II, 1874); Vexillum (Costellaria) suluense (A. Adams & Reeve, 1850); Vexillum rectilateralis (G. B. Sowerby II, 1874)

= Vexillum suluense =

Species of gastropod

Vexillum suluense is a species of small sea snail, marine gastropod mollusk in the family Costellariidae, the ribbed miters.

== Description ==
The shell size varies between 5 mm and 30 mm.

(Original description - described as Mitra rectilateralis ) The shell is turreted and acuminated. It is sculptured with straight longitudinal ribs and spiral striae. The body whorl is oblong, straight-sided above and below, banded with brown and white. The aperture is as long as the spire.

== Distribution ==
This species occurs off the Andaman Islands and in the Pacific Ocean off the Philippines, Fiji, the Solomons Islands, Papua New Guinea and Queensland, Australia.
