= Vexillum umbrosum =

Scientific classification
- Kingdom: Animalia
- Phylum: Mollusca
- Class: Gastropoda
- Subclass: Caenogastropoda
- Order: Neogastropoda
- Superfamily: Turbinelloidea
- Family: Costellariidae
- Genus: Vexillum
- Species: V. umbrosum

Binomial name
- Vexillum umbrosum (G. B. Sowerby II, 1874)

Synonyms
- Mitra umbrosa G. B. Sowerby II, 1874

Species of gastropod

Vexillum umbrosum is a species of sea snail, a marine gastropod mollusk, in the family Costellariidae, the ribbed miters.

== Description ==
The colouring of the shell is dark rich burnt brown. The ribs more defined than in Voluta vulpecula Linnaeus, 1758, raised into tubercles at the angle of the whorls.
