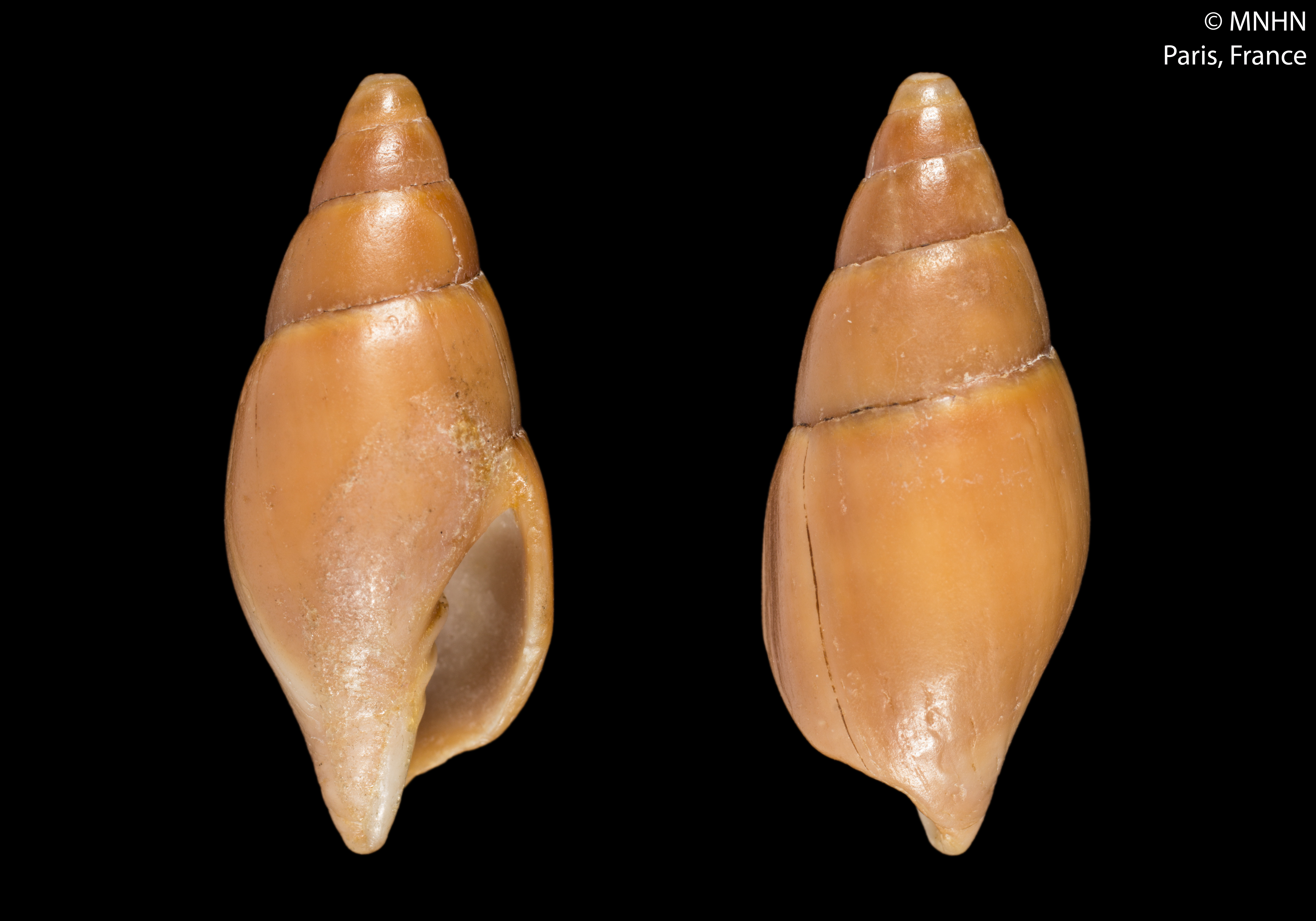
- Shell of Episcomitra cornicula (lectotype at MNHN, Paris)

Scientific classification
- Kingdom: Animalia
- Phylum: Mollusca
- Class: Gastropoda
- Subclass: Caenogastropoda
- Order: Neogastropoda
- Family: Mitridae
- Subfamily: Mitrinae
- Genus: Episcomitra
- Species: E. cornicula

Binomial name
- Episcomitra cornicula (Linnaeus, 1758)

Synonyms
- Mitra (Mitra) cornicula (Linnaeus, 1758); Mitra buccinoidea Risso, 1826; Mitra cornea var. minor Weinkauff, 1868; Mitra cornicula (Linnaeus, 1758); Mitra cornicula var. glandina Pallary, 1903; Mitra cornicularis Lamarck, 1822; Mitra corniculum [sic]; Mitra corniculum var. brusinae Kobelt, 1901; Mitra corniculum var. contraria Brusina, 1866; Mitra corniculum var. nigra Pallary, 1920; Mitra glabra Risso, 1826; Mitra graja Reeve, 1845; Mitra inflata Risso, 1826; Mitra insolata Sowerby G.B. II, 1874; Mitra lactea Philippi, 1836; Mitra laevigata Bosc, 1801; Mitra lutescens Lamarck, 1811; Mitra media Risso, 1826; Mitra nitens Risso, 1826; Mitra nitida A. Adams, 1853; Mitra obtusa Locard, 1886; Mitra philippiana Forbes, 1844; Mitra simplex Sowerby G.B. II, 1874; Mitra spongiarum Menke, 1829; Voluta cornicula Linnaeus, 1758; Voluta laevigata Gmelin, 1791; Voluta schroeteri Link, 1807

= Episcomitra cornicula =

Species of gastropod

Episcomitra cornicula is a species of sea snail, a marine gastropod mollusk, in the family Mitridae, the miters or miter snails.

== Description ==
The length of the shell varies between 11 mm and 40 mm.

The shell is short, solid, ventricose and chestnut. The whorls are rounded, the body whorl ventricose in the middle, contracted below, with two or three spiral grooves. The outer lip is flexuous.

== Distribution ==
This species occurs in the Mediterranean Sea, in the Atlantic Ocean and in tropical seas.
