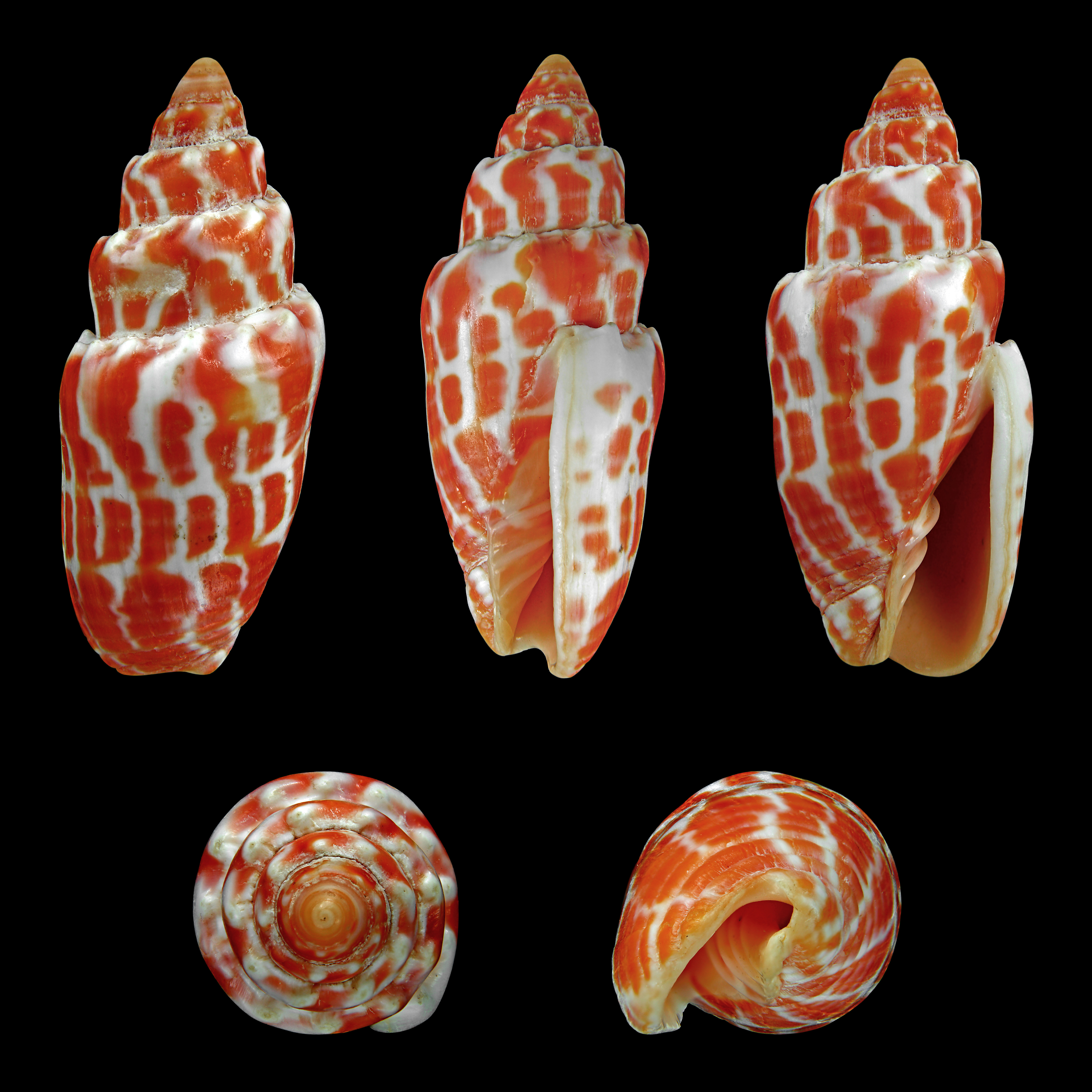
- Five views of a shell

Scientific classification
- Kingdom: Animalia
- Phylum: Mollusca
- Class: Gastropoda
- Subclass: Caenogastropoda
- Order: Neogastropoda
- Family: Mitridae
- Genus: Mitra
- Species: M. stictica

Binomial name
- Mitra stictica (Link, 1807)

Synonyms
- Mitra cardinalis Röding, P.F., 1798; Mitra abbatis Perry, G., 1811; Mitra pontificalis Lamarck, 1811; Mitra stricta – misspelling; Mitra coronata Schumacher, H.C.F., 1817; Voluta thiara Dillwyn, L.W., 1817; Mitra confluens Dautzenberg, Ph., 1935

= Mitra stictica =

Species of gastropod

Mitra (Mitra) stictica, commonly known as the pontifical mitre, is a species of sea snail, a marine gastropod mollusk in the family Mitridae, the mitres.

== Description ==
The length of an adult shell varies between 30 and 87 mm (1.2 and 3.4 in).

== Distribution ==
This species occurs in the tropical Indian Ocean off Aldabra, Chagos, the Mascarene Basin, Mauritius and Tanzania, and in the Pacific Ocean off Fiji, New Zealand, and the Solomons.
