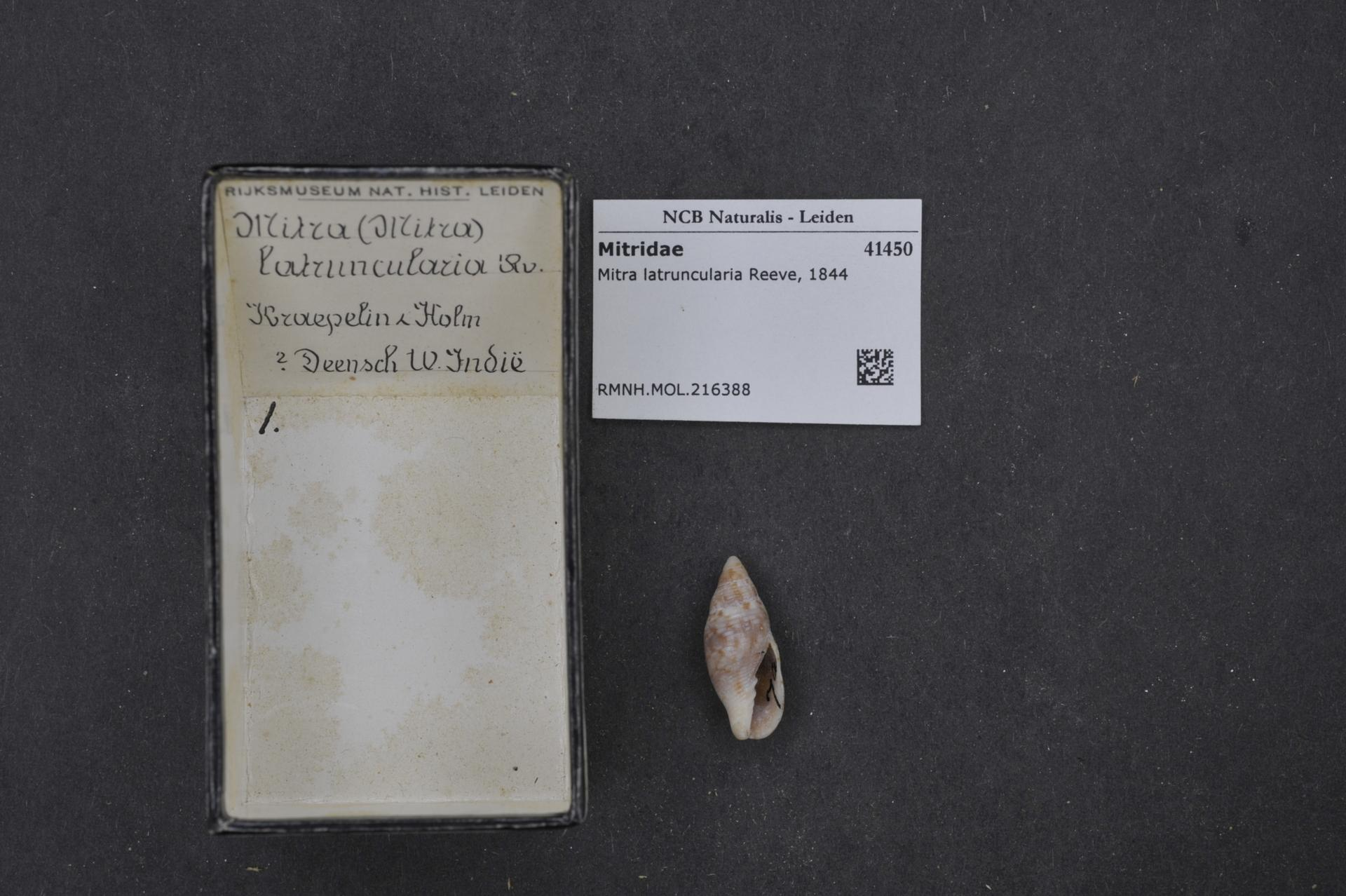

Scientific classification
- Kingdom: Animalia
- Phylum: Mollusca
- Class: Gastropoda
- Subclass: Caenogastropoda
- Order: Neogastropoda
- Family: Mitridae
- Genus: Quasimitra
- Species: Q. latruncularia

Binomial name
- Quasimitra latruncularia (Reeve, 1844)

Synonyms
- Mitra latruncularia Reeve, 1844

= Quasimitra latruncularia =

Species of gastropod

Quasimitra latruncularia is a species of sea snail, a marine gastropod mollusk in the family Mitridae, the miters or miter snails.
