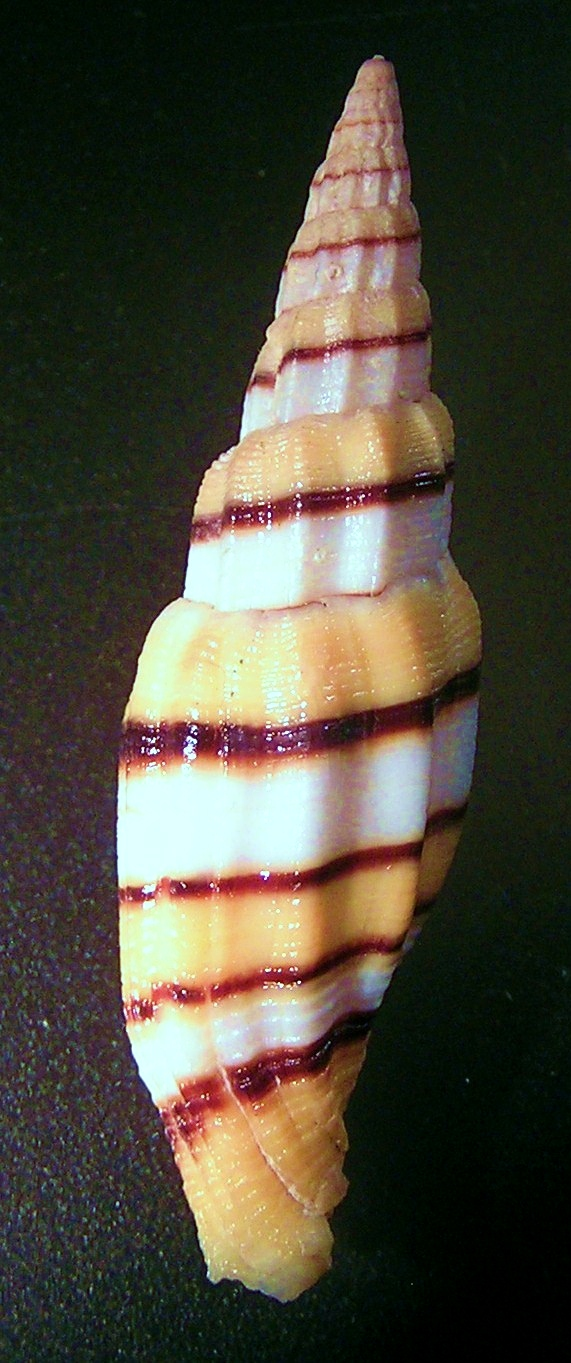

Scientific classification
- Kingdom: Animalia
- Phylum: Mollusca
- Class: Gastropoda
- Subclass: Caenogastropoda
- Order: Neogastropoda
- Family: Costellariidae
- Genus: Vexillum
- Species: V. taeniatum

Binomial name
- Vexillum taeniatum (Lamarck, 1811)

Synonyms
- Mitra taeniata Lamarck, 1811; Mitra gloriosa Noordt, 1819; Mitra vittata Swainson, W.A., 1822; Mitra crocea Sowerby II & Sowerby III, 1874; Vexillum (Vexillum) taylorianum Sowerby, G.B. II & III, 1874; Mitra jucunda Dunker, R.W., 1879; Mitra fasciata Dall, W.H., 1905; Mitra permutata Dautzenberg, Ph. & J.L. Bouge, 1923

= Vexillum taeniatum =

Species of gastropod

Vexillum taeniatum, common name: the ribboned mitre, is a species of small sea snail, marine gastropod mollusk in the family Costellariidae, the ribbed miters.

== Description ==
The shell size varies between 38 mm and 85 mm.

The narrow, fusiform shell has a high spire. The shoulders are sharply rounded below the suture. The shell is axially ribbed with ten ribs on the body whorl. These are crossed by spiral cords that become weak on the middle of the body whorl. The interior of the outer lip is lirate. The columella has five plaits. The siphonal canal is extended and recurved.

The shell is yellowish or orange, with a broad white central band, partly visible on the spire and is bordered with narrow chocolate bands. There are one or two additional chocolate bands below, sometimes replaced by a single broad one next below the white.

== Distribution ==
This species occurs in the Indian Ocean off Madagascar and in the Pacific Ocean off the Philippines, Indonesia, Fiji, Papua New Guinea and in the Gulf of Thailand.
