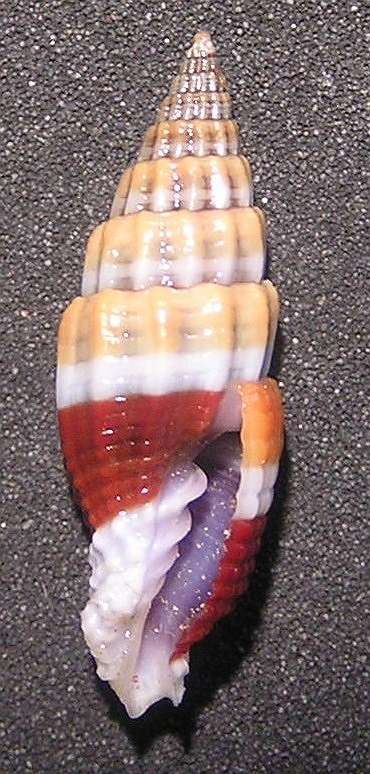
- Vexillum militare

Scientific classification
- Kingdom: Animalia
- Phylum: Mollusca
- Class: Gastropoda
- Subclass: Caenogastropoda
- Order: Neogastropoda
- Superfamily: Turbinelloidea
- Family: Costellariidae
- Genus: Vexillum
- Species: V. militare

Binomial name
- Vexillum militare (Reeve, 1845)

Synonyms
- Mitra militaris Reeve, 1845; Vexillum (Costellaria) militare (Reeve, 1845); Vexillum coronense J. Cate, 1968; Vexillum militaris (Reeve, 1845) (incorrect gender ending)

= Vexillum militare =

Species of gastropod

Vexillum militare is a species of small sea snail, marine gastropod mollusk in the family Costellariidae, the ribbed miters.

== Description ==
The shell size varies between 5 mm and 20 mm. The shell is somewhat fusiform in shape, decreasing in size at its base. The spire tapers to a slender point, its sutures (parts dividing one whorl from another) are deep and ribbed lengthwise. The shell has interstices crosswise deeply lineated, crosswise and its ribs are blunt. The upper whorls are yellow, while the body whorl is encircled in crimson red. Its columella (central column) is four plaited.

The shell shows a bright scarlet band on the lower part of the body whorl.

== Distribution ==
This species is distributed in the Western Pacific Ocean and the Philippines and Australia (Queensland).
