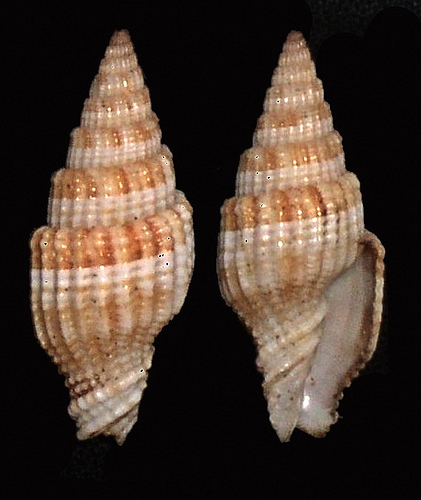
- Vexillum unifasciale

Scientific classification
- Kingdom: Animalia
- Phylum: Mollusca
- Class: Gastropoda
- Subclass: Caenogastropoda
- Order: Neogastropoda
- Superfamily: Turbinelloidea
- Family: Costellariidae
- Genus: Vexillum
- Species: V. unifasciale

Binomial name
- Vexillum unifasciale (Lamarck, 1811)

Synonyms
- Mitra (Turricula) garrettii G. Nevill & H. Nevill, 1874; Mitra assimilis Garrett, 1873 (invalid: junior homonym of Mitra assimilis Pease, 1868; Mitra garrettii G. Nevill & H. Nevill, 1874 is a replacement name); Mitra fratercula Garrett, 1873; Mitra hemprichi Jickeli, 1874 ·; Mitra unifascialis Lamarck, 1811; Mitra venustula Reeve, 1844 junior subjective synonym; Vexillum (Pusia) unifasciale (Lamarck, 1811); Vexillum (Pusia) unifascialis (Lamarck, 1811)

= Vexillum unifasciale =

Species of gastropod

Vexillum unifasciale is a species of sea snail, a marine gastropod mollusk, in the family Costellariidae, the ribbed miters.

== Description ==
Juvenile

The length of the shell attains 19 mm, its diameter 8 mm; the length can attain 29 mm.

(Described as Mitra fratercula) The oblong shell is subfusiform, solid, shining and, contracted at the base. The spire is moderately elevated, acute, brownish-yellow, transversely lineated with deep brown, and adorned with a spiral white band. The shell contains 8-9 whorls, plano-convex, slightly shouldered, longitudinally ribbed. The ribs are small, closely set, angular, 16 to 18 in number, slightly nodulose above, and the interstices remotely transversely impressedly striated. The body whorl is large, roundly convex, granulated towards the base. The aperture is narrow, little less than half the length of the shell, bluish white and lyrate within. The columella has four folds.

The animal is light brown, dotted and mottled with yellowish white.

This is a very rare species, found under stones on reefs.

(Described as Vexillum venustulum) The shell is ovate with an acuminated spire. The whorls are convex and longitudinally granosely ribbed. The shell is bright yellow, encircled with two or three narrow dark chesnut zones. The columella is four-plaited.

== Distribution ==
This marine species occurs in the Red Sea, the Persian Gulf and in the Indo-West Pacific and Polynesia (Tahiti, Rarotonga, Samoa, and Hawaii); also off the Philippines and Japan; also off Australia (New South Wales, Queensland and Papua New Guinea).
