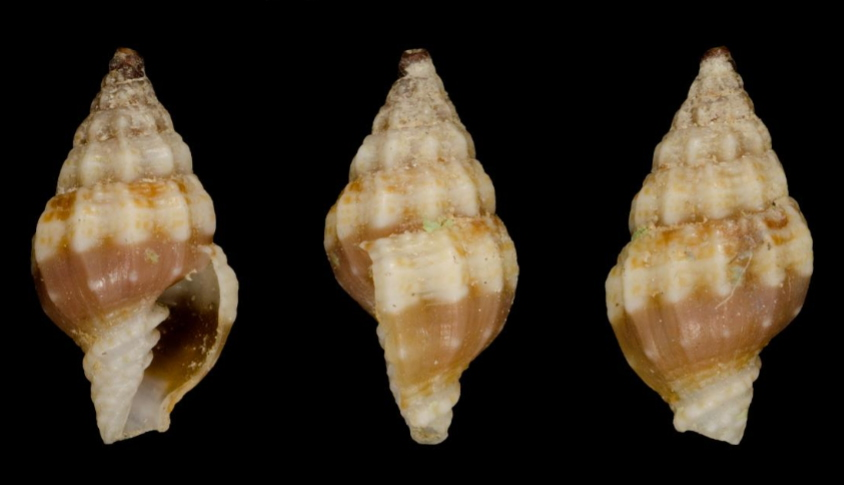
- Shell of Vexillum leucozonias (holotype at the Smithsonian Institution)

Scientific classification
- Kingdom: Animalia
- Phylum: Mollusca
- Class: Gastropoda
- Subclass: Caenogastropoda
- Order: Neogastropoda
- Superfamily: Turbinelloidea
- Family: Costellariidae
- Genus: Vexillum
- Species: V. leucozonias

Binomial name
- Vexillum leucozonias (Deshayes in Laborde, 1834)

Synonyms
- Mitra batista J. Cate, 1963; Mitra cineracea Reeve, 1845; Mitra leucozonias Deshayes, 1833 (original combination); Mitra moana J. M. Cate, 1963; Mitra (Costellaria) leucozonias (Deshayes, 1833); Turricula cineracea (Reeve, 1845); Vexillum (Costellaria) leucozonias (Deshayes, 1833); Vexillum cinereum [sic]

= Vexillum leucozonias =

Species of gastropod

Vexillum leucozonias is a species of small sea snail, marine gastropod mollusk in the family Costellariidae, the ribbed miters.

== Description ==
The length of the shell attains 11 mm.

The shell is ashy gray, with an interrupted white band at the shoulder, and white-tinged at the base.

(Described as Mitra cineracea) The whorls are angular, and the ribs at the angle have each a little white spot. These spots run into each other, forming a continuous band. The shell is otherwise gray, or brown. The aperture is very short.

== Distribution ==
This species occurs in the Red Sea, off Mozambique; off Hawaii, the Society Islands, the Solomon Islands and Tuamotus.
