= List of the prehistoric life of Hawaii =

This list of the prehistoric life of Hawaii contains the various prehistoric life-forms whose fossilized remains have been reported from within the US state of Hawaii.

== Precambrian-Mesozoic ==
The oldest of the Hawaiian islands is a little more than 5 million years old, and the Paleobiology Database records no known occurrences of Precambrian, Paleozoic, or Mesozoic fossils in Hawaii.

== Cenozoic ==
This list of the Cenozoic life of Hawaii contains the various prehistoric life-forms whose fossilized remains have been reported from within the US state of Hawaii and are between 66 million and 10,000 years of age.

=== A ===
- Acar
  - †Acar plicata
- Acropora
  - †Acropora cerealis – tentative report
- Acrosterigma
  - †Acrosterigma orbita
- Amphisorus
- Amphistegina
  - †Amphistegina lessonii
- †Aplodon
  - †Aplodon tectus
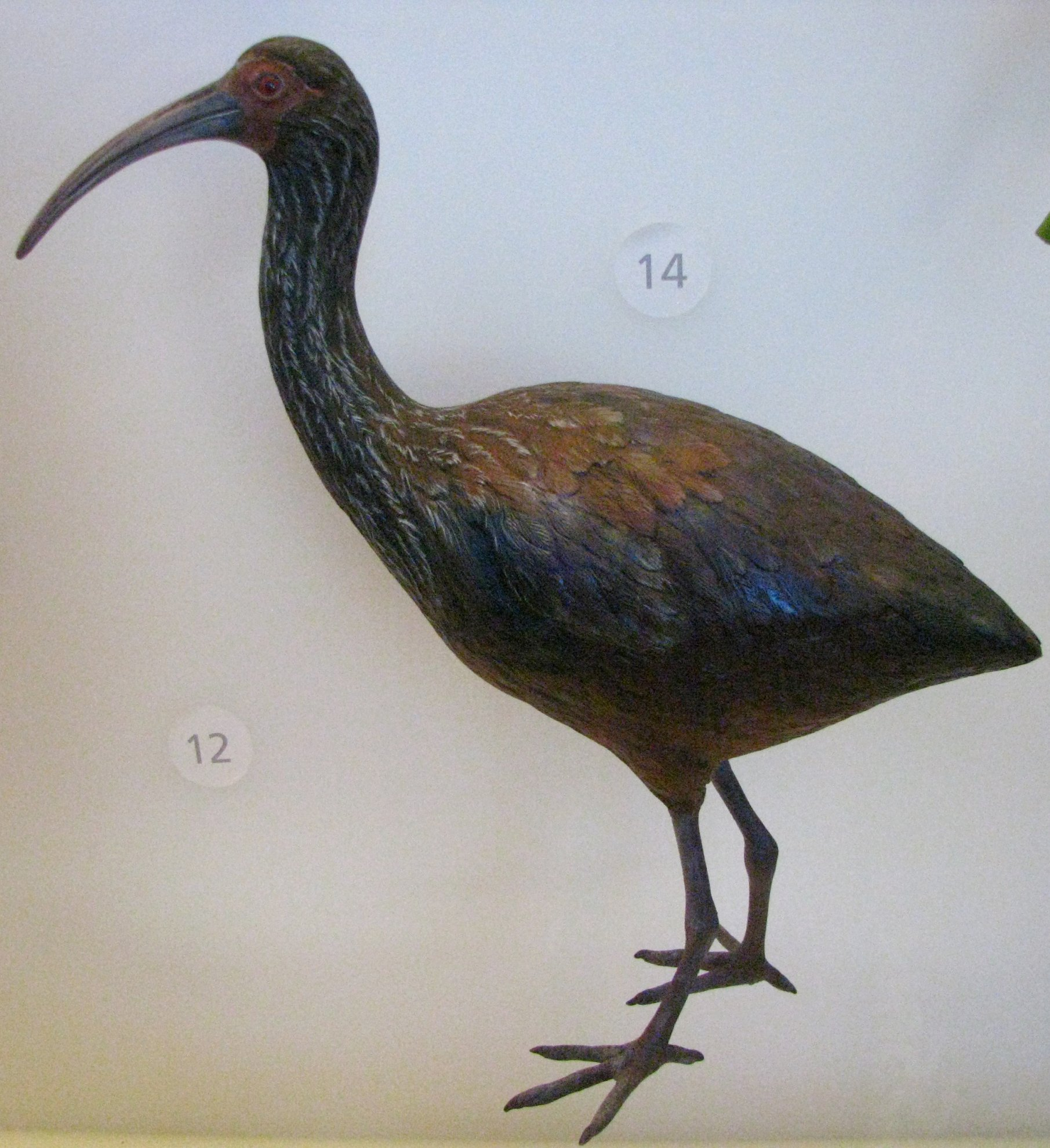
- Restorative model of an Apteribis flightless ibis
  †Apteribis
  - †Apteribis glenos
- Arca
  - †Arca ventricosa
  - †Arca vetula
- Astrea
  - †Astrea curta – or unidentified comparable form

=== B ===
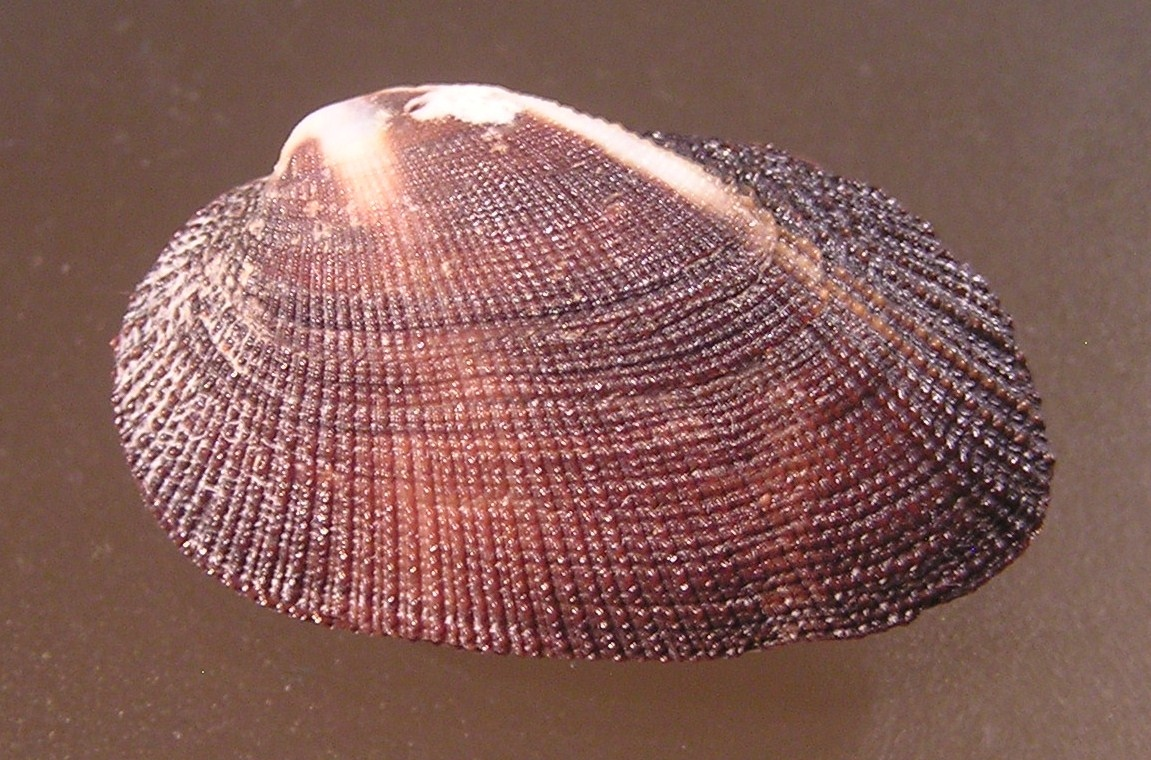
- Shell of a Barbatia, or bearded ark clam
  Barbatia
  - †Barbatia hawaia
  - †Barbatia hendersoni
  - †Barbatia oahua
  - †Barbatia tenella
- Bostrycapulus
  - †Bostrycapulus gravispinosa
- Brachidontes
  - †Brachidontes crebristriatus
- Branta
  - †Branta hylobadistes – or unidentified related form
- Bulla
  - †Bulla peasei
- Bursa
  - †Bursa bufonia
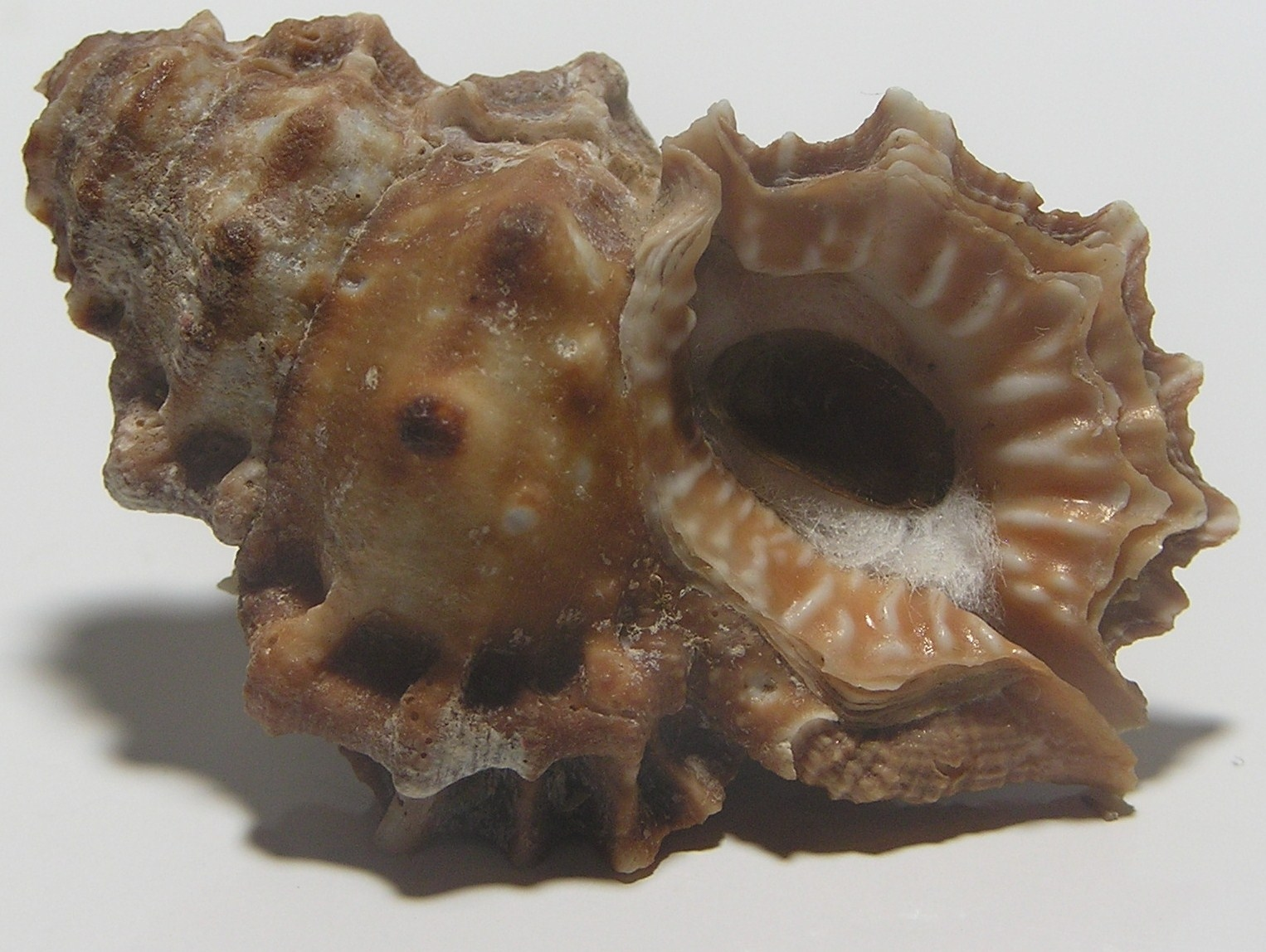
  - Shell of a Bursa corrugata frog shell sea snail
    †Bursa corrugata

=== C ===
- Calcarina – or unidentified comparable form
- Calliotrochus
  - †Calliotrochus marmoreus
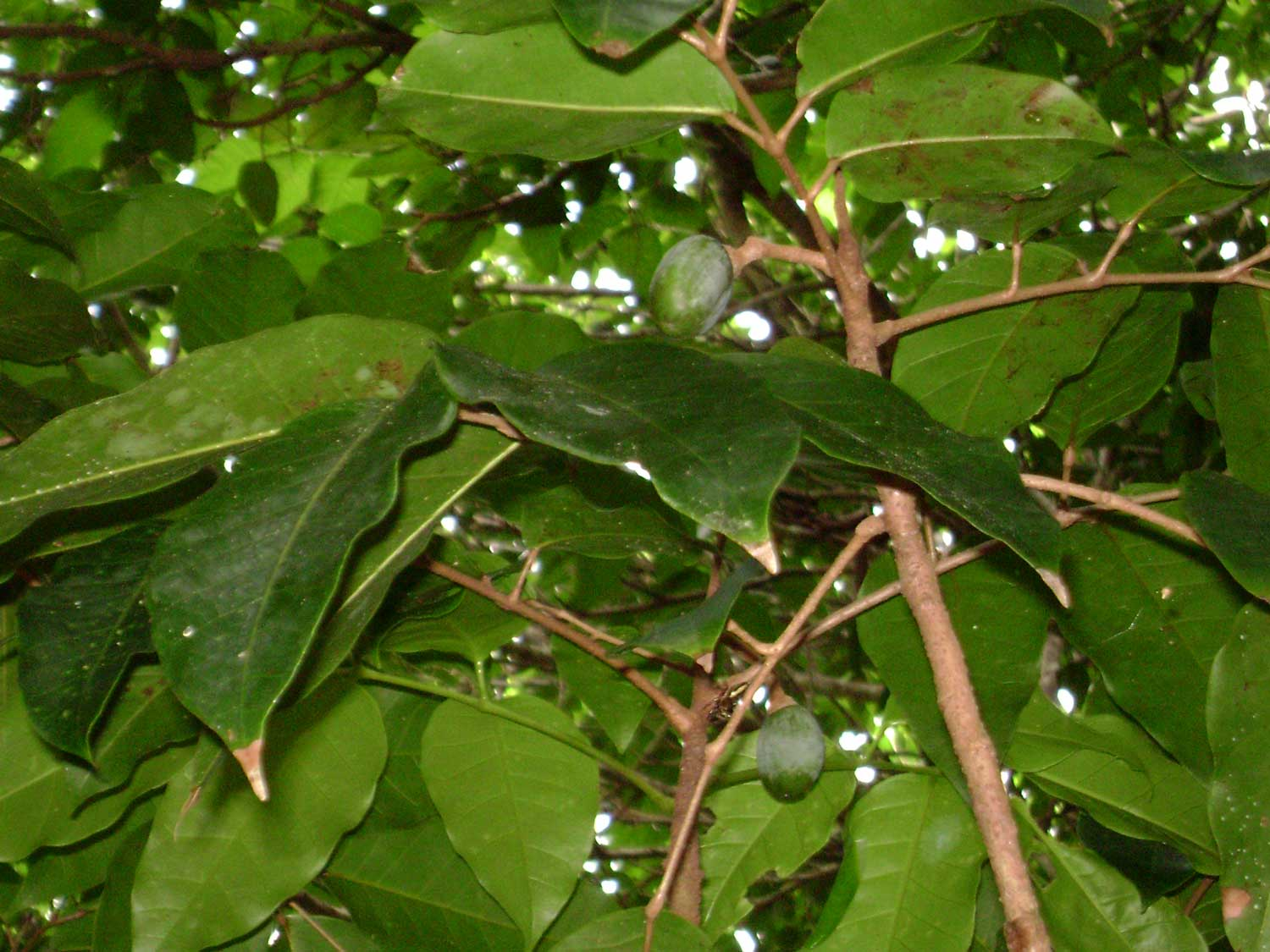
- Foliage of a living Canarium tree
  †Canarium
  - †Canarium maculatus
  - †Canarium mutabilis
- Cancilla
  - †Cancilla granatina
- Carcharodon
- Casmaria
  - †Casmaria cernica
  - †Casmaria erinaceus
  - †Casmaria ponderosa
- Cellana
  - †Cellana argentata
  - †Cellana exarata
  - †Cellana melanostoma
- Cerithiopsis
  - †Cerithiopsis radicula
- Cerithium
  - †Cerithium columna
  - †Cerithium echinatum
  - †Cerithium interstria
  - †Cerithium mutatum
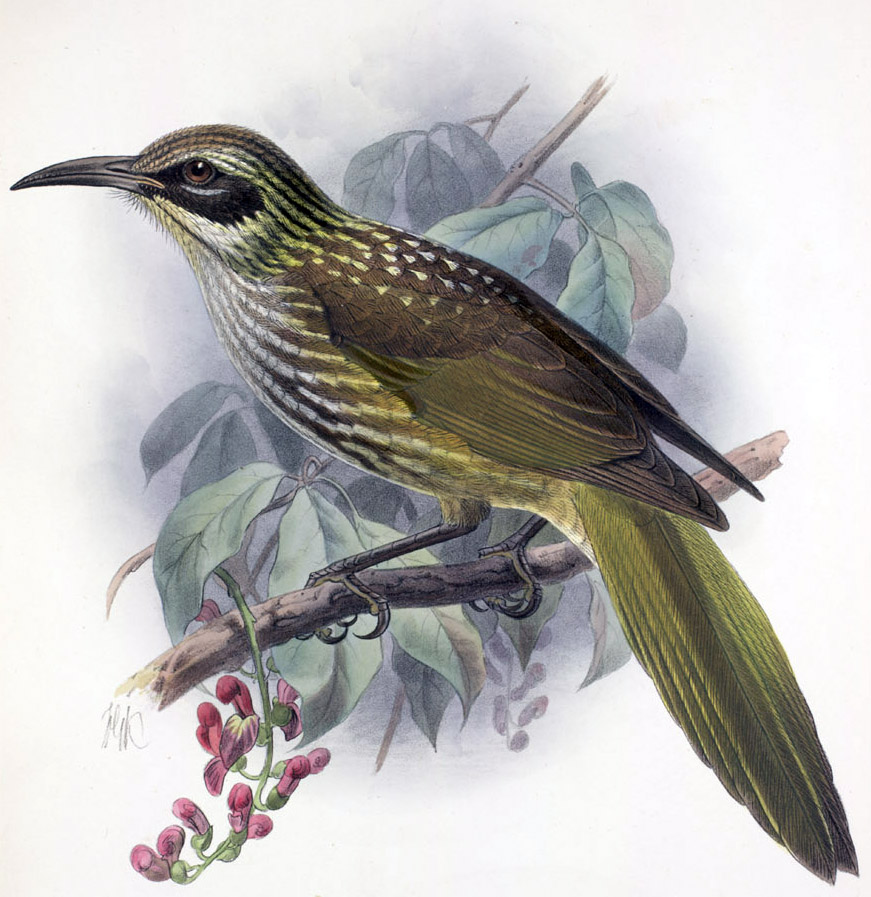
- Illustration of a Chaetoptila angustipluma, or kioea
  †Chaetoptila
- Chama
  - †Chama limbula
- Charonia
  - †Charonia triton
- Cheilea
  - †Cheilea cicatricosa
  - †Cheilea dillwyni
- Chlamys
  - †Chlamys cookei
  - †Chlamys hawaiensis
- Circus
  - †Circus dossenus – type locality for species
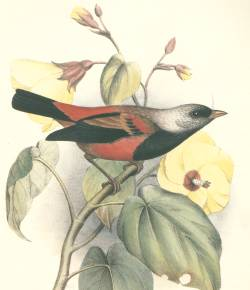
- Illustration of a CiridopsHawaiian honeycreeper
  †Ciridops
- Clava
  - †Clava atromarginatum
  - †Clava nesioticus
- Clypeomorus
  - †Clypeomorus graniferum
  - †Clypeomorus obeliscus
- Codakia
  - †Codakia thaanumi
- Columbella
  - †Columbella varians
- Conus
  - †Conus abbreviatus
  - †Conus aulicus
  - †Conus catus
  - †Conus chaldaeus
  - †Conus ebraeus
  - †Conus flavidus
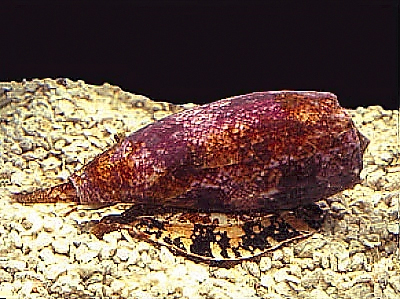
  - A living Conus geographus, or the geography cone sea snail
    †Conus geographus
  - †Conus granifer – or unidentified comparable form
  - †Conus imperialis
  - †Conus kahiko – type locality for species
  - †Conus litoglyphus
  - †Conus lividus
  - †Conus moreleti – or unidentified comparable form
  - †Conus nanus
  - †Conus nussatella
  - †Conus obscura
  - †Conus planorbis
  - †Conus plicarius
  - †Conus praelatus
  - †Conus pulicarius
  - †Conus rattus
  - †Conus retifer
  - †Conus sponsalis
  - †Conus striatus
  - †Conus tulipa
  - †Conus vexillum
- Coralliobia
  - †Coralliobia fimbriatus
- Coralliophila
  - †Coralliophila madreporarum
  - †Coralliophila violacea
- Corvus
- Cribrarula
  - †Cribrarula gaskoini
- Ctena
  - †Ctena bella
- Cycloseris
- Cymatium
  - †Cymatium gemmatum
  - †Cymatium mundum
- Cyphastrea
  - †Cyphastrea ocellina
- Multiple views of a shell of a Cypraea cowrie sea snail
  Cypraea

=== D ===
- Daphnella
  - †Daphnella ornata
- Dendropoma
  - †Dendropoma maximus
- Diodora
  - †Diodora granifera
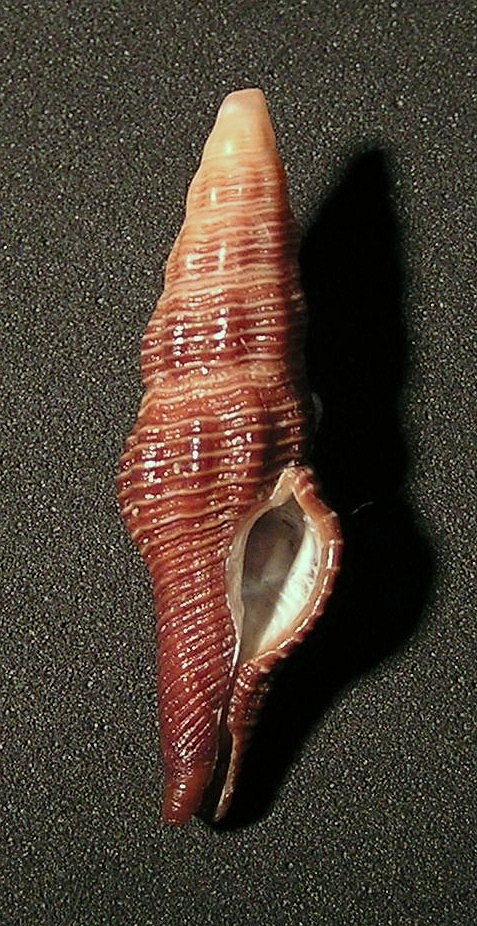
- Shell of a Dolicholatirus sea snail
  †Dolicholatirus
  - †Dolicholatirus acus
- Drupa
  - †Drupa albolabris
  - †Drupa morum
  - †Drupa ricina
  - †Drupa rubusidaeus

=== E ===
- Erosaria
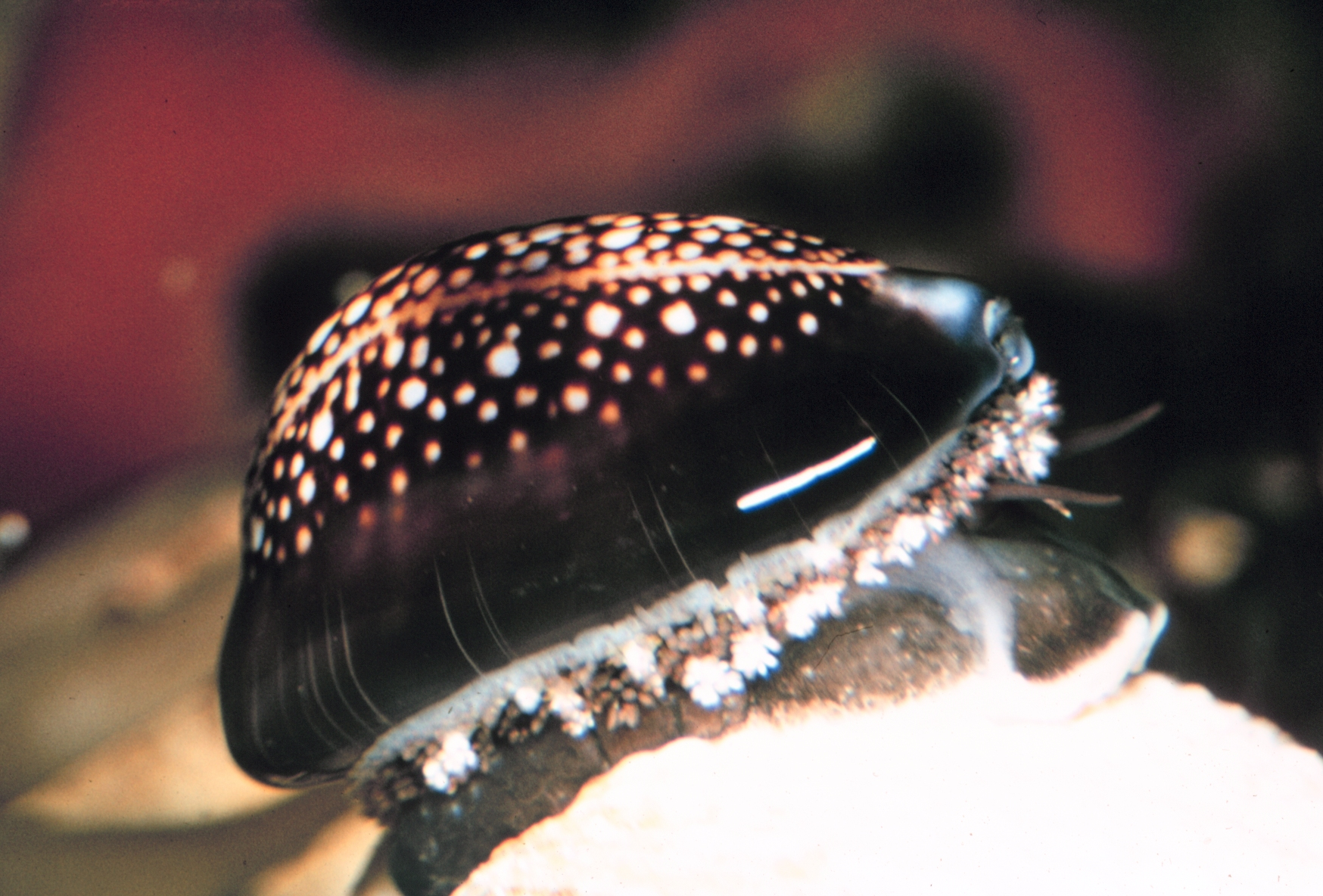
  - A living Monetaria caputserpentis, or snakehead cowry
    †Erosaria caputserpentis
  - †Erosaria erosa
  - †Erosaria helvola
  - †Erosaria labrolineata
  - †Erosaria poraria

=== F ===
- Favia
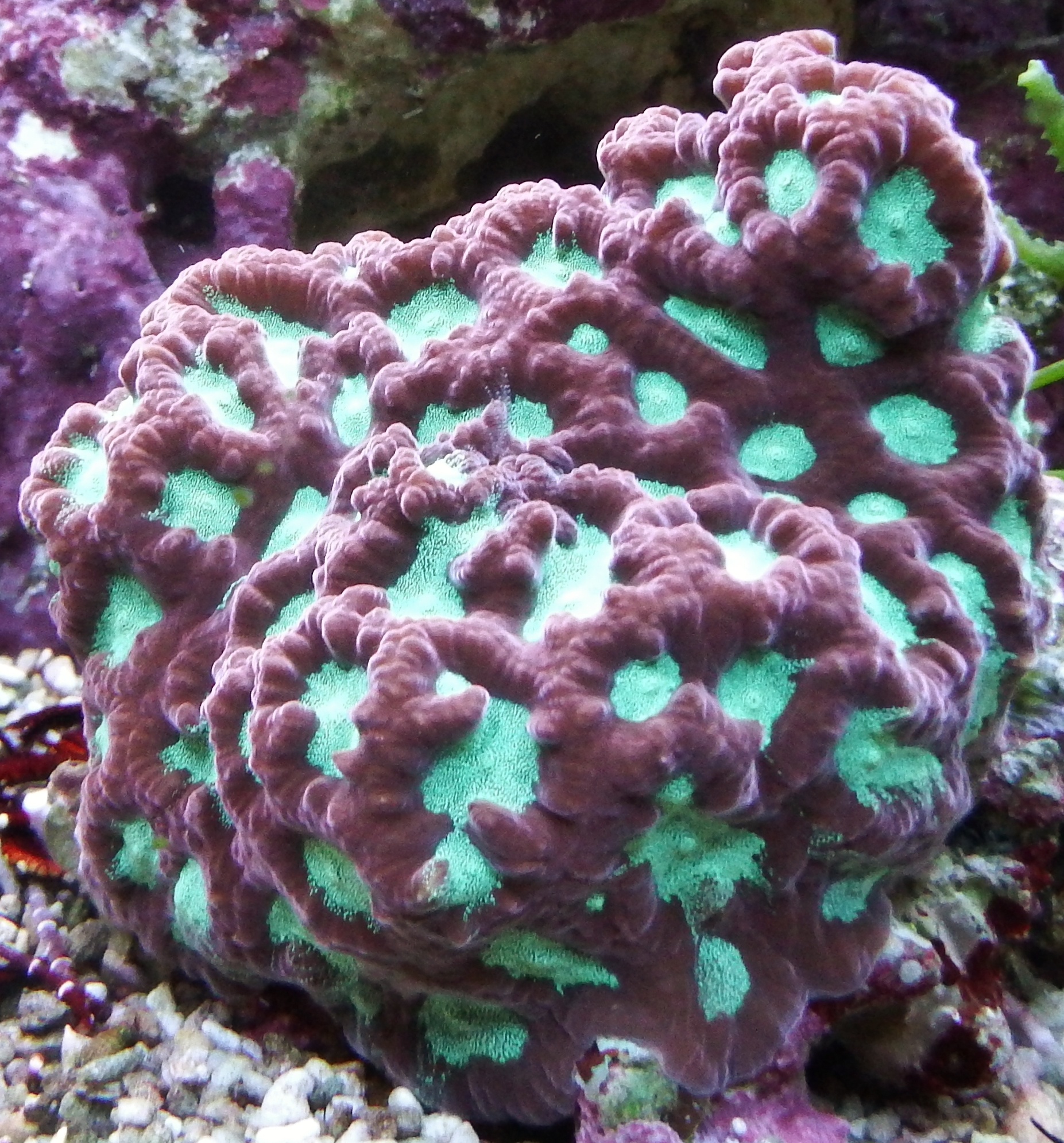
- Living Favites stony coral
  Favites
  - †Favites chinensis – or unidentified comparable form
- Flabellipecten
  - †Flabellipecten stearnsii
- Fungia
  - †Fungia scutaria
- Fusinus

=== G ===
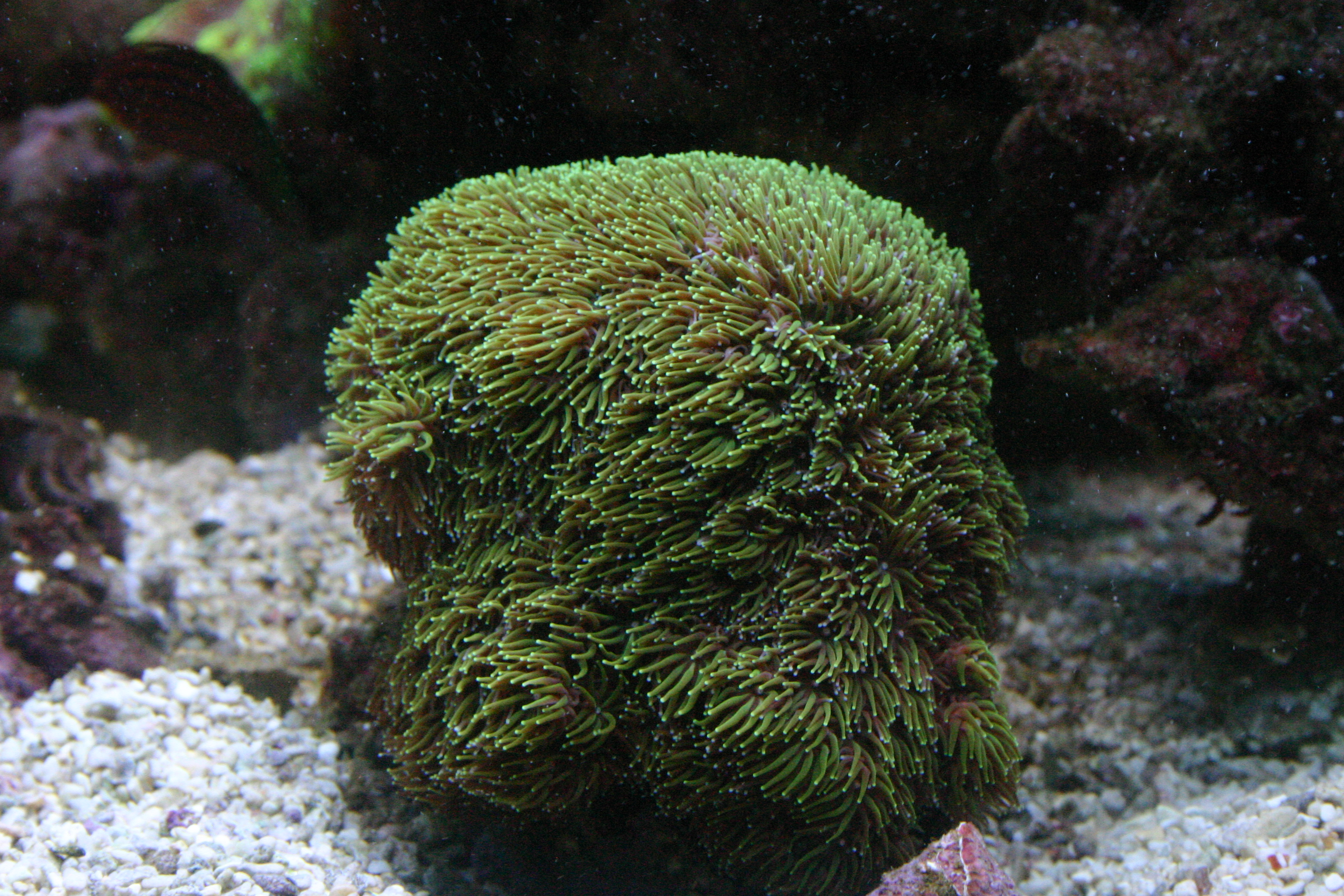
- Living Galaxea stony coral
  †Galaxea
  - †Galaxea haligena – or unidentified comparable form
- Gardineroseris
  - †Gardineroseris planulata
- Gastrochaena
  - †Gastrochaena hawaiensis
- Globulina
- †Grallistrix
  - †Grallistrix geleches – type locality for species
  - †Grallistrix orion – type locality for species
- Gutturinium
  - †Gutturinium muricinum
- Gypsina

=== H ===
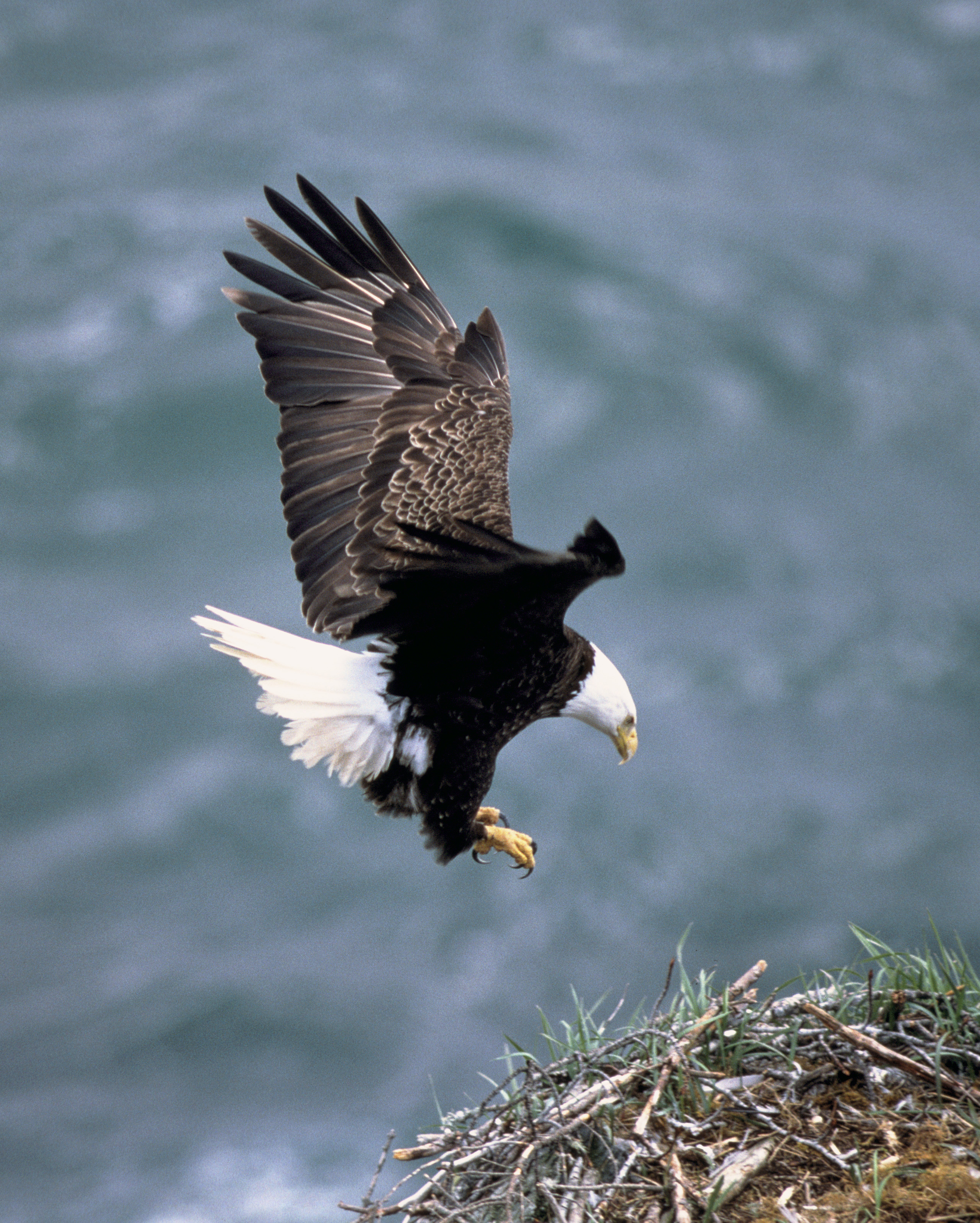
- A living Haliaeetus, or sea eagle
  Haliaeetus
- †Halimeda
- Haminoea
  - †Haminoea curta
- Harpa
  - †Harpa amouretta
  - †Harpa armouret – or unidentified comparable form
- Hastula
  - †Hastula confusa
  - †Hastula mera
  - †Hastula verreauxi
- Heliacus
  - †Heliacus variegata
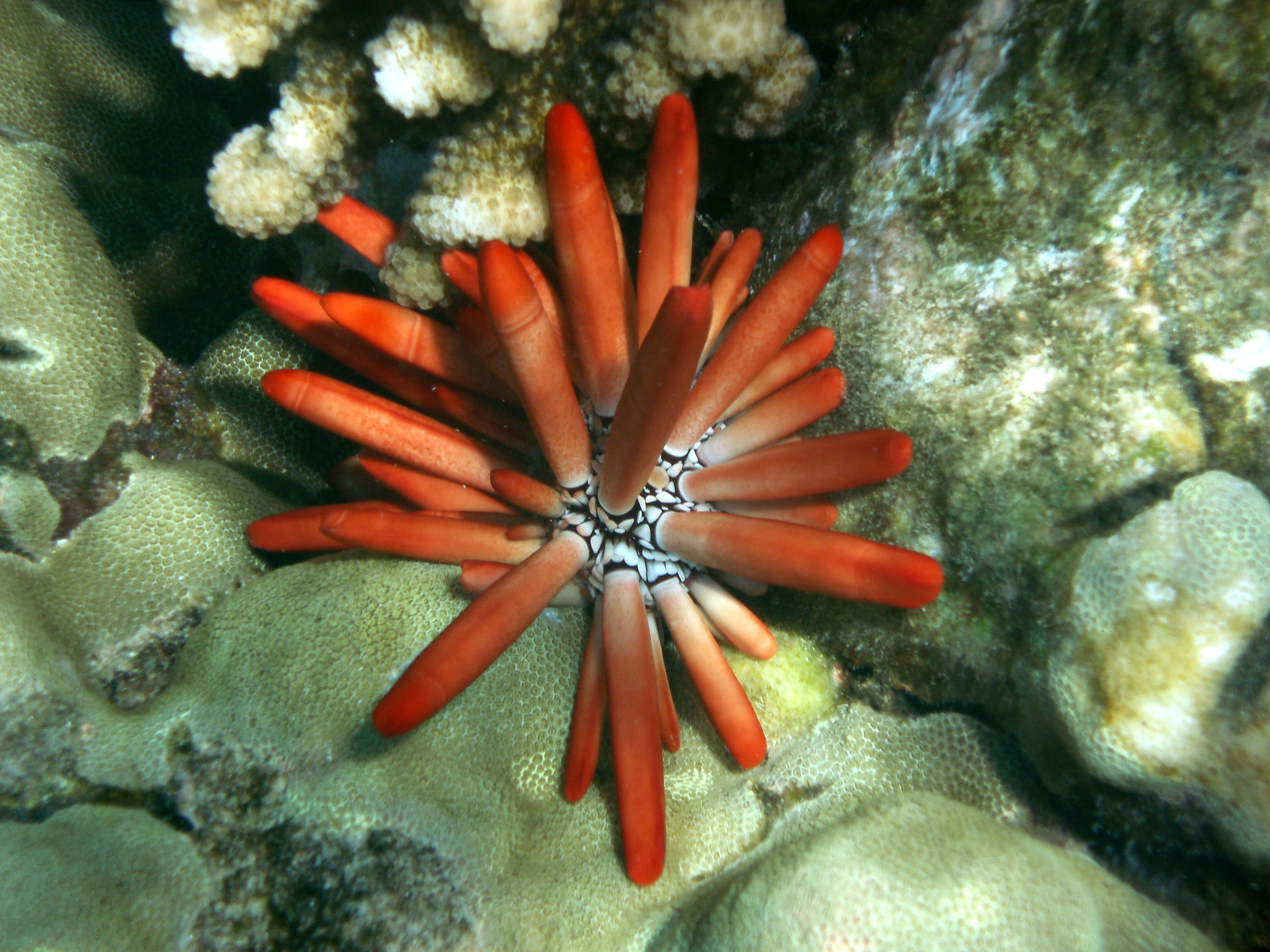
- A living Heterocentrotus mamillatus, or red slate pencil urchin
  Heterocentrotus
  - †Heterocentrotus mammillatus
- Heterostegina
- Hipponix
  - †Hipponix foliacea
  - †Hipponix pilosa
- Hydrolithon
  - †Hydrolithon munitum
  - †Hydrolithon onkodes
  - †Hydrolithon rupestre

=== I ===
- Isognomon
  - †Isognomon marspiallis

=== L ===
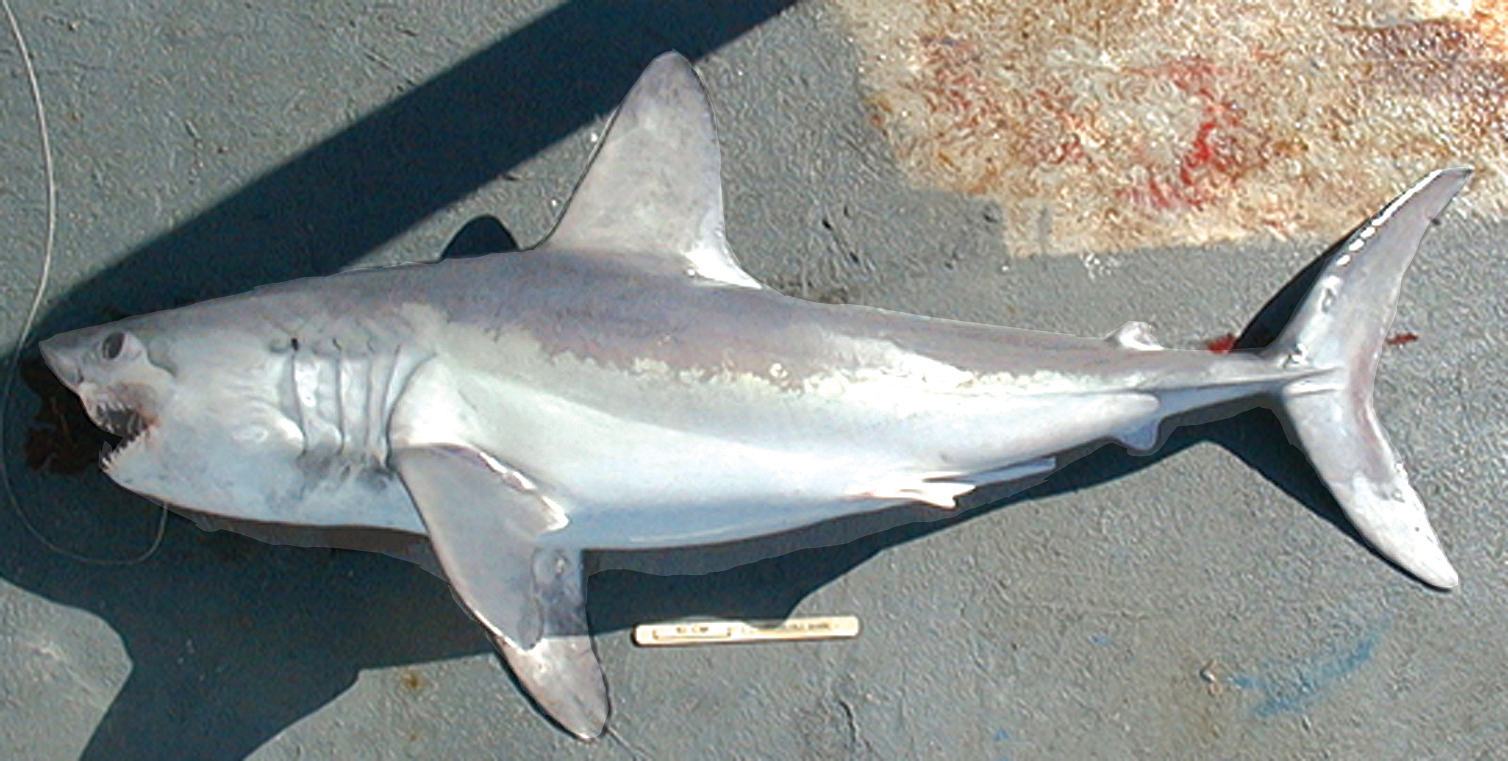
- A modern Lamna mackerel shark
  Lamna
- Leptastrea
  - †Leptastrea purpurea
- Leptoseris
  - †Leptoseris hawaiiensis
- Linatella
  - †Linatella succinta – or unidentified comparable form
- Liocerithium
  - †Liocerithium thaanumi
- †Litharium
  - †Litharium oceanida
- Lithophaga
  - †Lithophaga hawaia
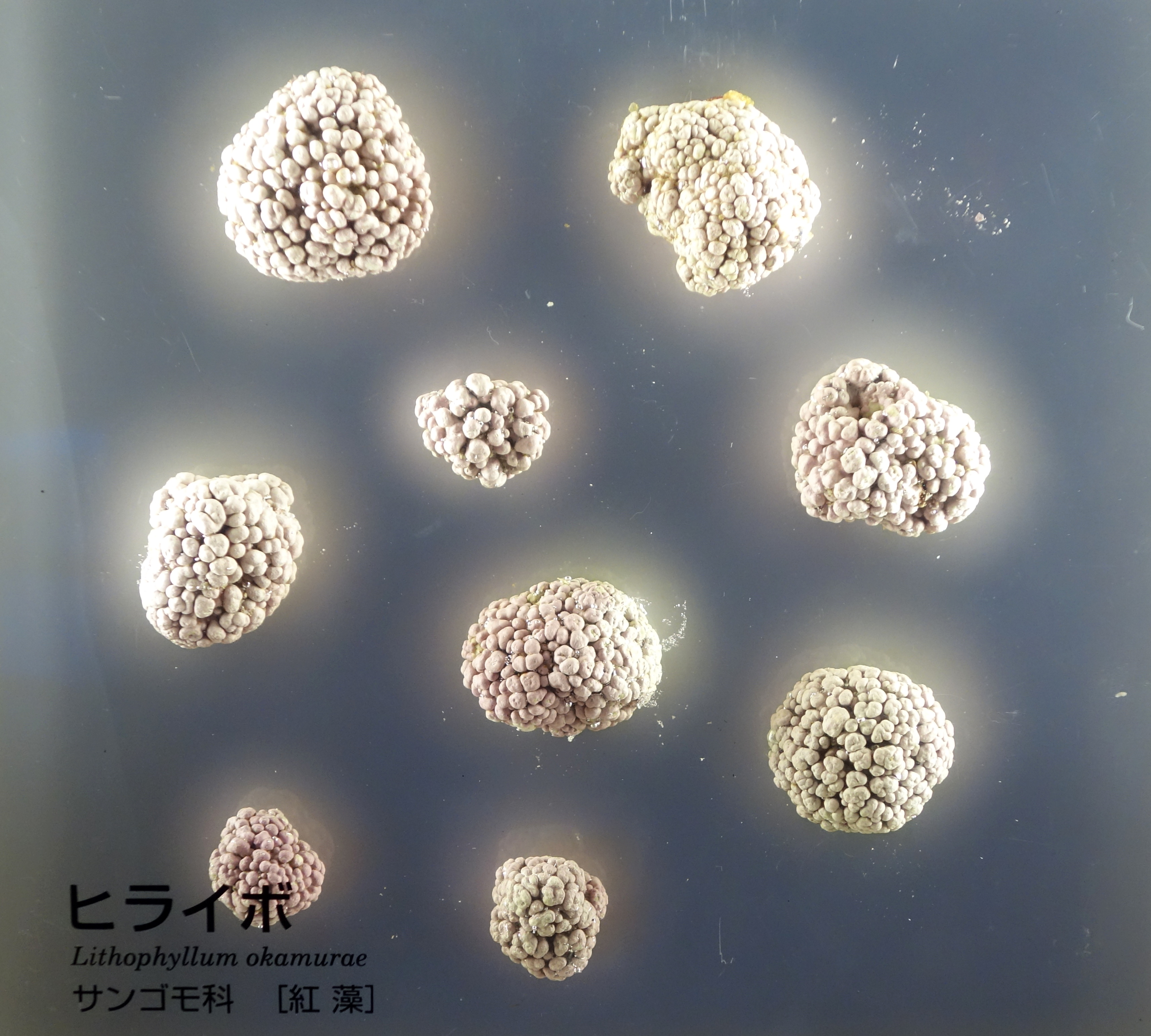
- Lithophyllum red algae
  Lithophyllum
  - †Lithophyllum acrocamptum
  - †Lithophyllum incrassatum
  - †Lithophyllum insipidum
  - †Lithophyllum pustulatum
- †Lithoporella
  - †Lithoporella melobesiodes
- Lithothamnion
  - †Lithothamnion muelleri
  - †Lithothamnion prolifer
  - †Lithothamnion pulchrum
- Littoraria
  - †Littoraria pintado
- Luria
  - †Luria isabella
  - †Luria tessellata
- Lyncina
  - †Lyncina carneola
  - †Lyncina leviathan
  - †Lyncina schilderorum
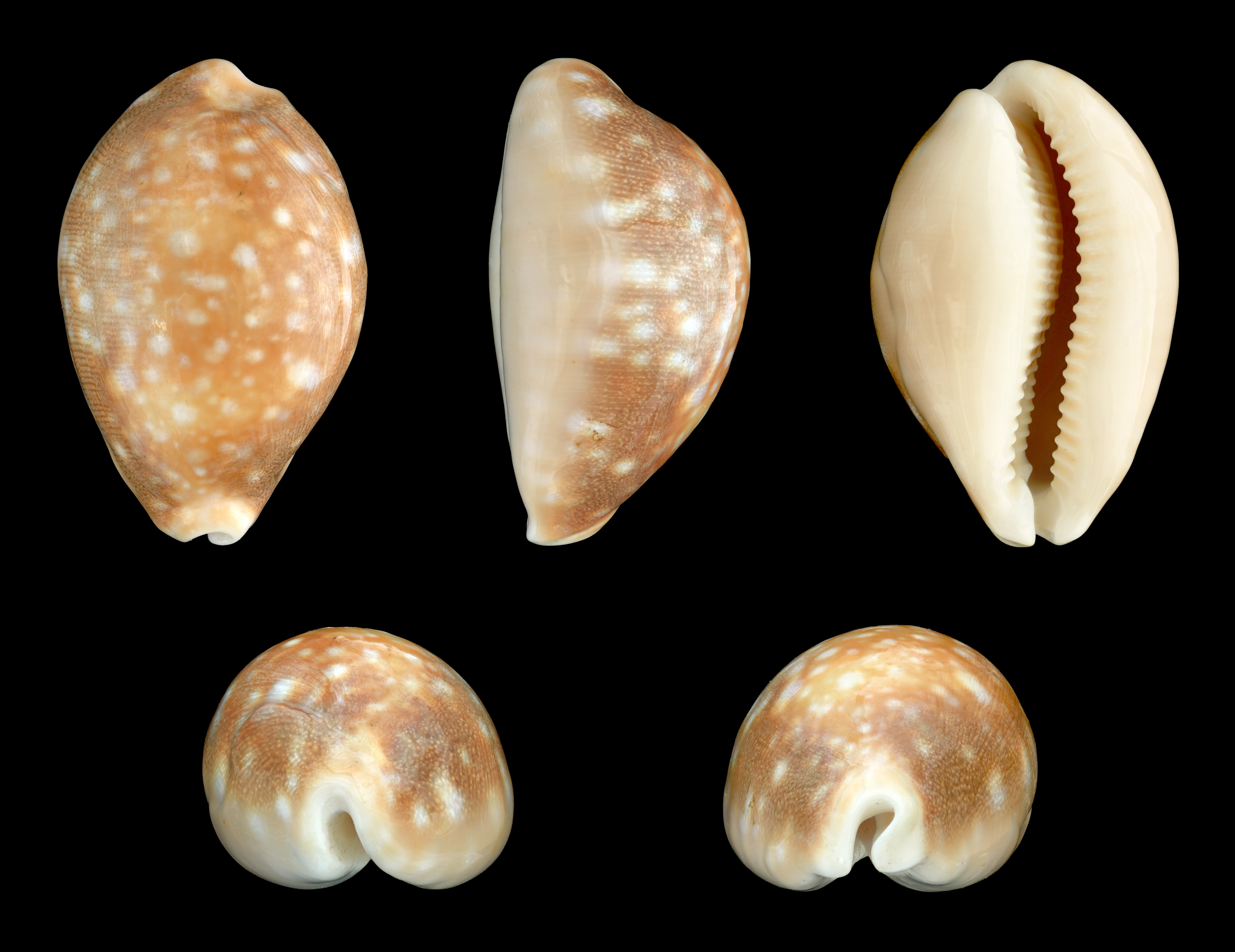
  - Shell in multiple views of a Lyncina vitellus, or calf cowry
    †Lyncina vitellus

=== M ===
- Mauritia
  - †Mauritia maculifera
  - †Mauritia mauritiana
  - †Mauritia scurra
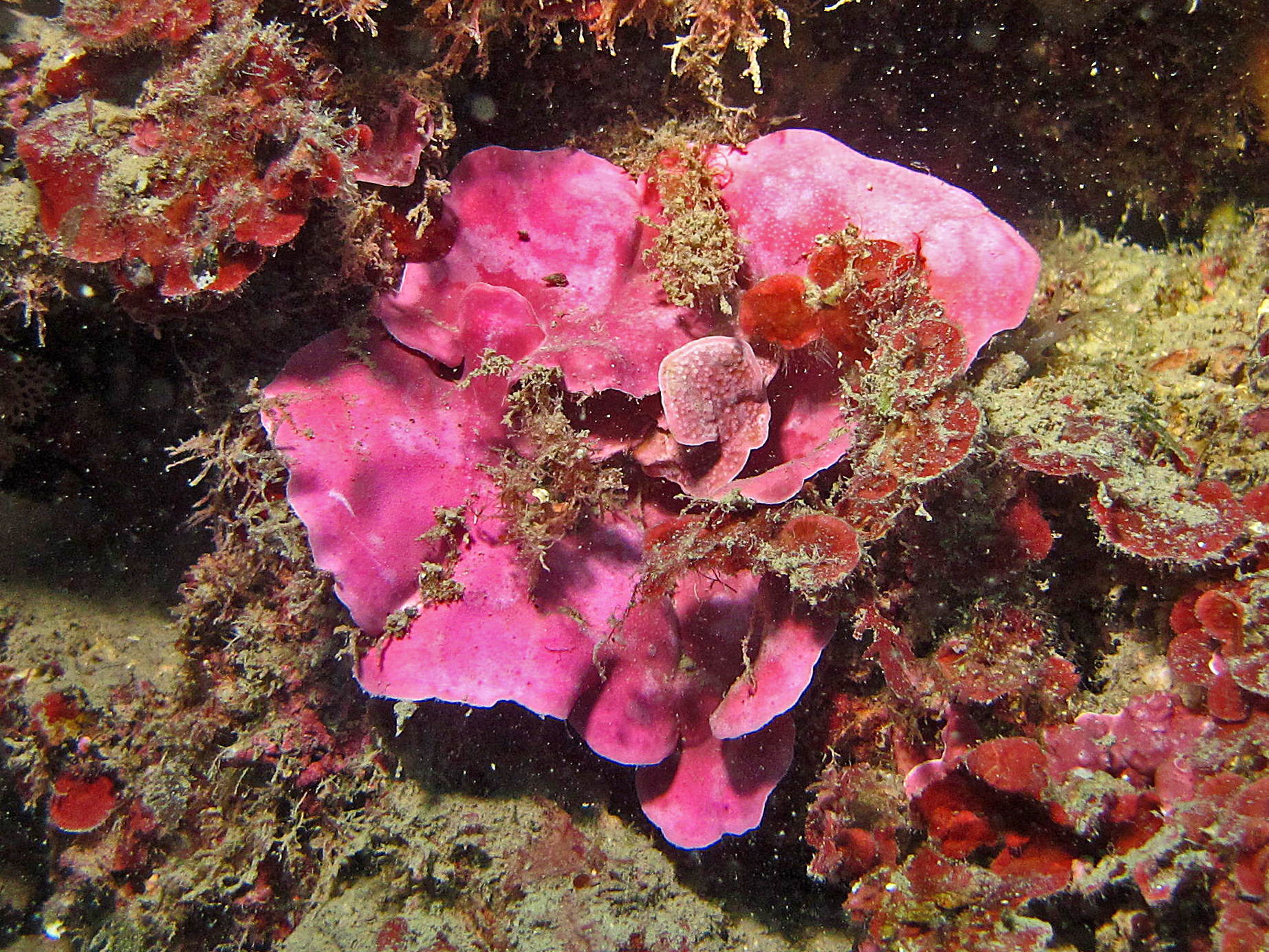
- Living Mesophyllum red algae
  Mesophyllum
- †Micromelo
  - †Micromelo guamensis
- †Miripecten
  - †Miripecten amaliae – or unidentified comparable form
- Mitra
  - †Mitra ambigua
  - †Mitra assimilis
  - †Mitra astricta
  - †Mitra brunnea
  - †Mitra chrysalis
  - †Mitra crassa
  - †Mitra fulvescens
  - †Mitra limbifera
  - †Mitra litterata
  - †Mitra lutea
  - †Mitra mitra
  - †Mitra pellisserpentis
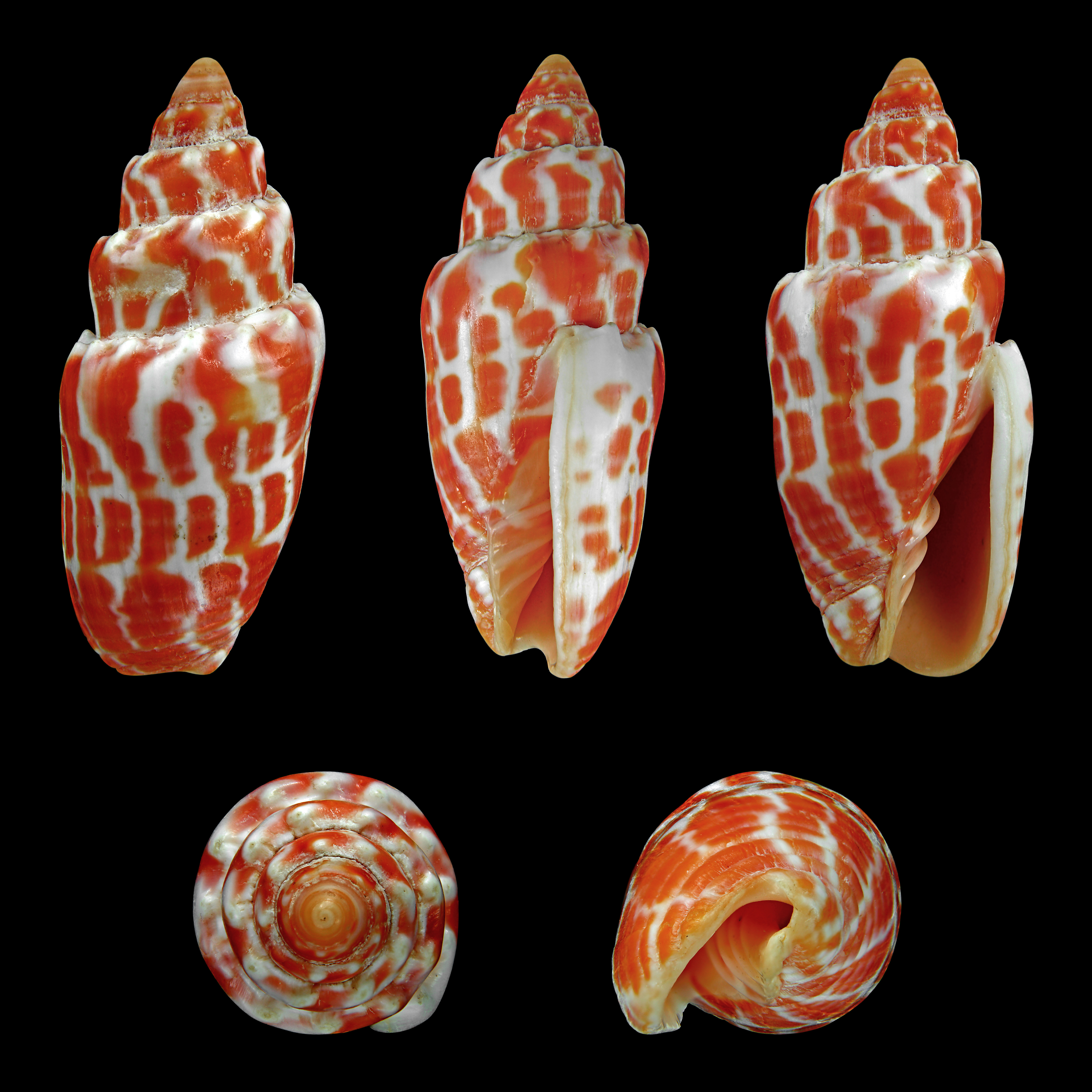
  - Shell in multiple views of a Mitra stictica, or pontifical mitre shell sea snail
    †Mitra stictica
  - †Mitra tabanula
- Monoplex
  - †Monoplex nicobaricus
  - †Monoplex pilearis
- Montipora
  - †Montipora hispida
- Morula
- †Morulina
  - †Morulina chrysostoma
  - †Morulina morus
  - †Morulina ochrostoma

=== N ===
- Nassa
  - †Nassa francolinus
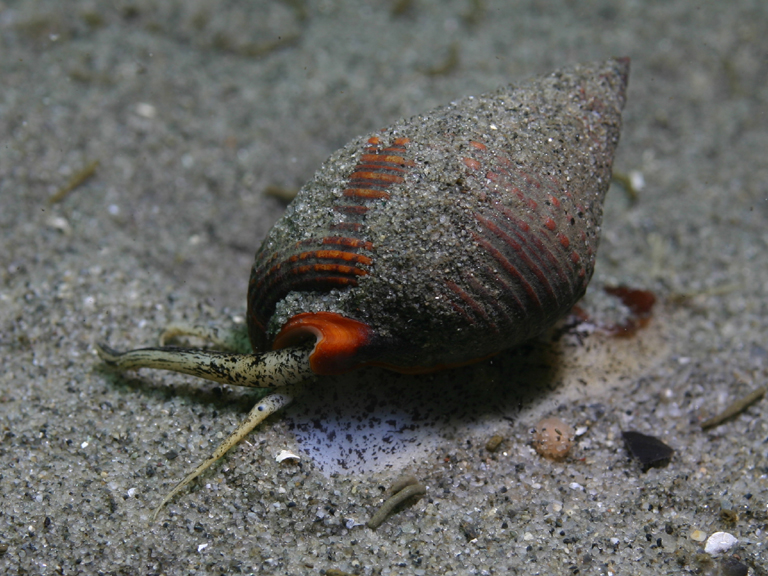
- A living Nassarius, or nassa mud snail
  Nassarius
  - †Nassarius crematus
  - †Nassarius hirtus
  - †Nassarius pauperus
  - †Nassarius pictus
- Natica
  - †Natica lurida
- †Neogoniolithon
  - †Neogoniolithon fosliei
- Nerita
  - †Nerita neglecta
  - †Nerita picea
- Neritina
  - †Neritina turrita
- Numenius
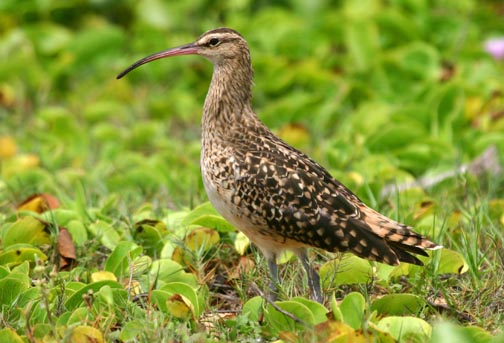
  - A living Numenius tahitiensis, or bristle-thighed curlew
    †Numenius tahitiensis

=== O ===
- Oliva
  - †Oliva sandwicensis
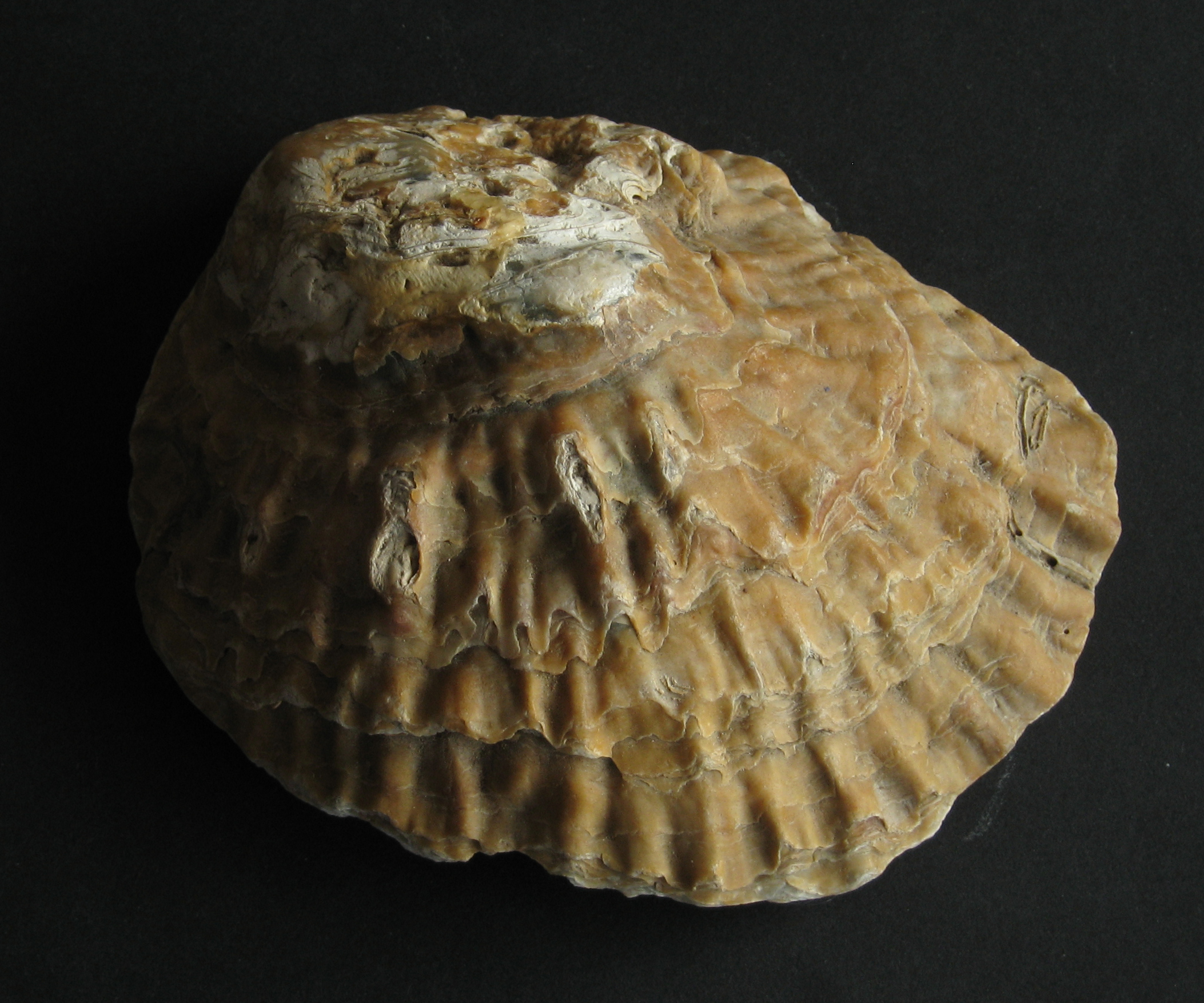
- Shell of an Ostrea, or oyster
  Ostrea
  - †Ostrea kamehameha
  - †Ostrea retusa
  - †Ostrea sandvichensis
  - †Ostrea thaanumi
- †Oxyrhina

=== P ===
- Pavona
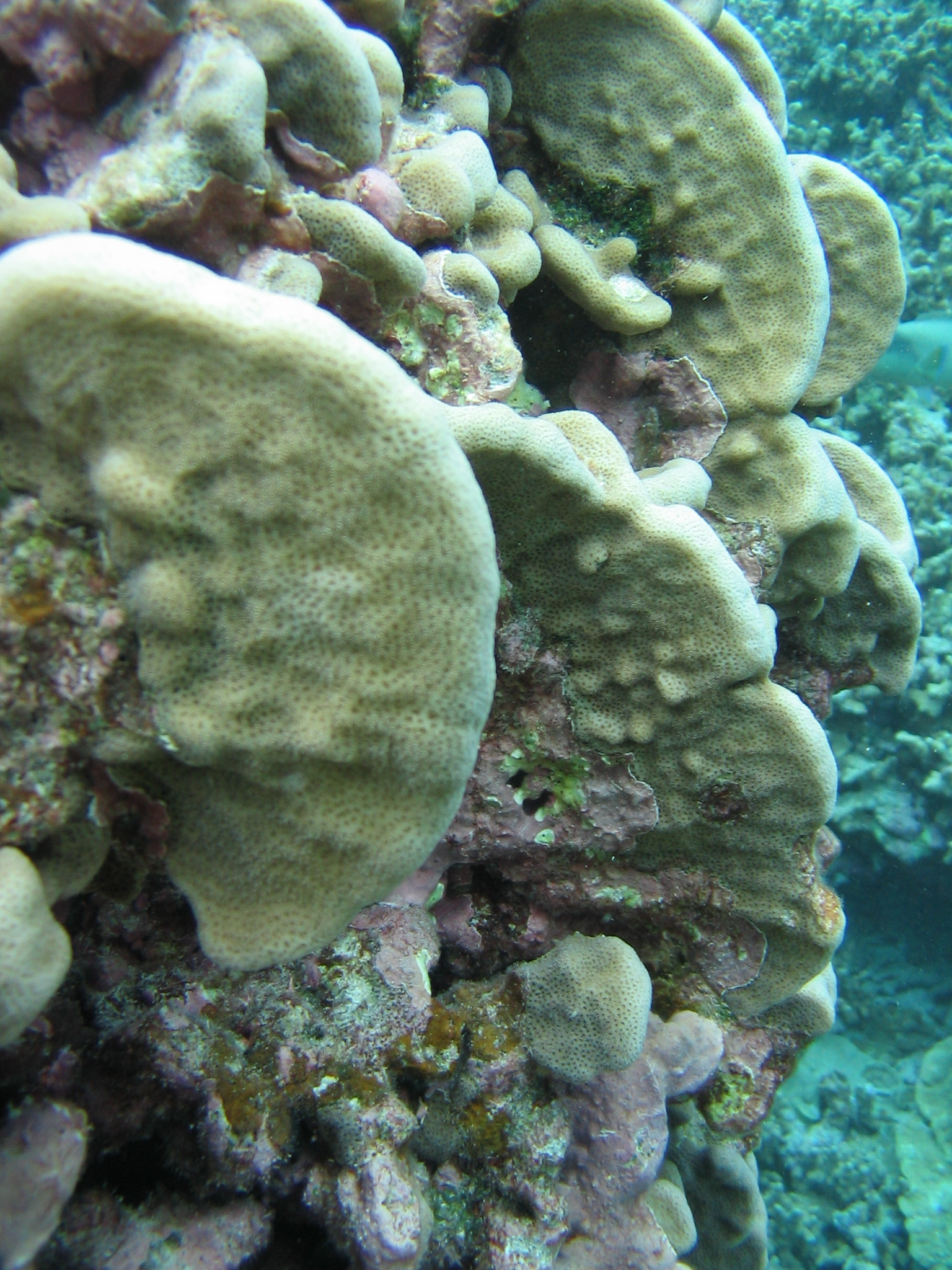
  - Living Pavona duerdeni, or porkchop coral
    †Pavona duerdeni
  - †Pavona varians
- Peneroplis
- Periglypta
  - †Periglypta reticulata
- Peristernia
  - †Peristernia chlorostoma
- Peyssonnelia
- †Phaeornis
  - †Phaeornis obscurus
- Pinctada
  - †Pinctada margaritifera
- Pisania
  - †Pisania ignea
  - †Pisania marmorata
- †Planorbinella
- Platygyra
- Plesiotrochus
  - †Plesiotrochus exilis
- Pocillopora
  - †Pocillopora damicornis
  - †Pocillopora eydouxi
  - †Pocillopora ligulata
  - †Pocillopora molekensis
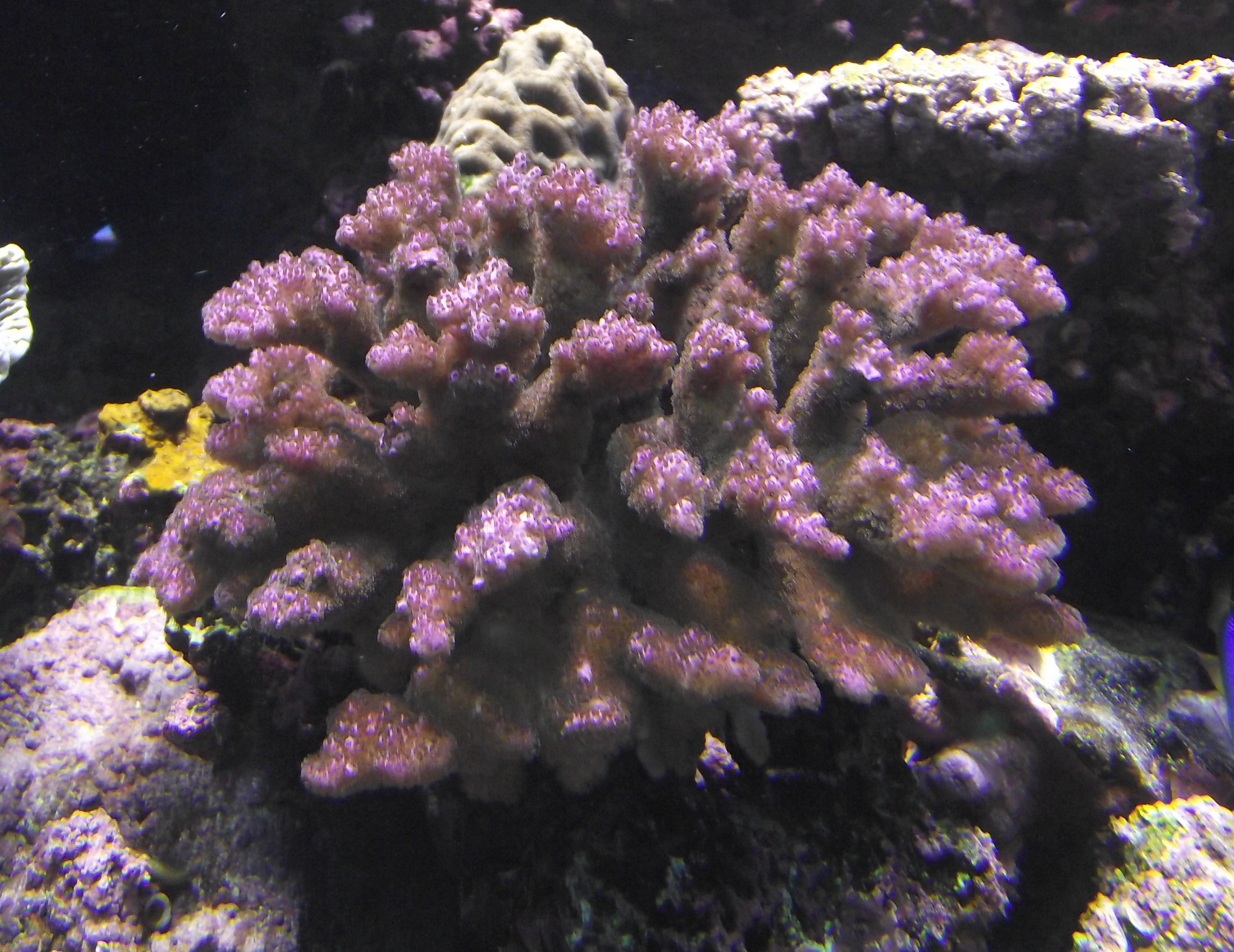
  - Living Pocillopora verrucosa, or cauliflower coral
    †Pocillopora verrucosa
- Polinices
  - †Polinices opaca
- Porites
  - †Porites compressa
  - †Porites lobata
- †Porolithon
  - †Porolithon gardineri
- Porzana
  - †Porzana ralphorum – type locality for species
  - †Porzana ziegleri – type locality for species
- Proterato
  - †Proterato sandwichensis
- Psammocora
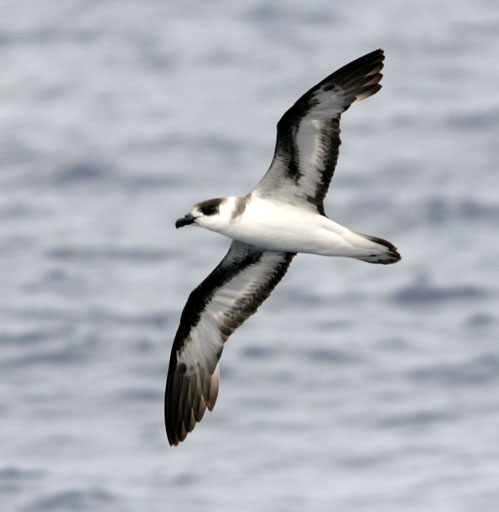
- A living Pterodroma, or gadfly petrel
  Pterodroma
  - †Pterodroma hypoleuca
  - †Pterodroma jugabilis – type locality for species
  - †Pterodroma phaeopygia
- Purpura
  - †Purpura intermedia
- †Purpuradusta
  - †Purpuradusta fimbriata
- Pustularia
  - †Pustularia cicercula
- Pyrene
  - †Pyrene moleculina

=== Q ===
- Quidnipagus
  - †Quidnipagus palatum
- Quinqueloculina

=== R ===
- Rhinoclavis
  - †Rhinoclavis articulata
- Rissoina
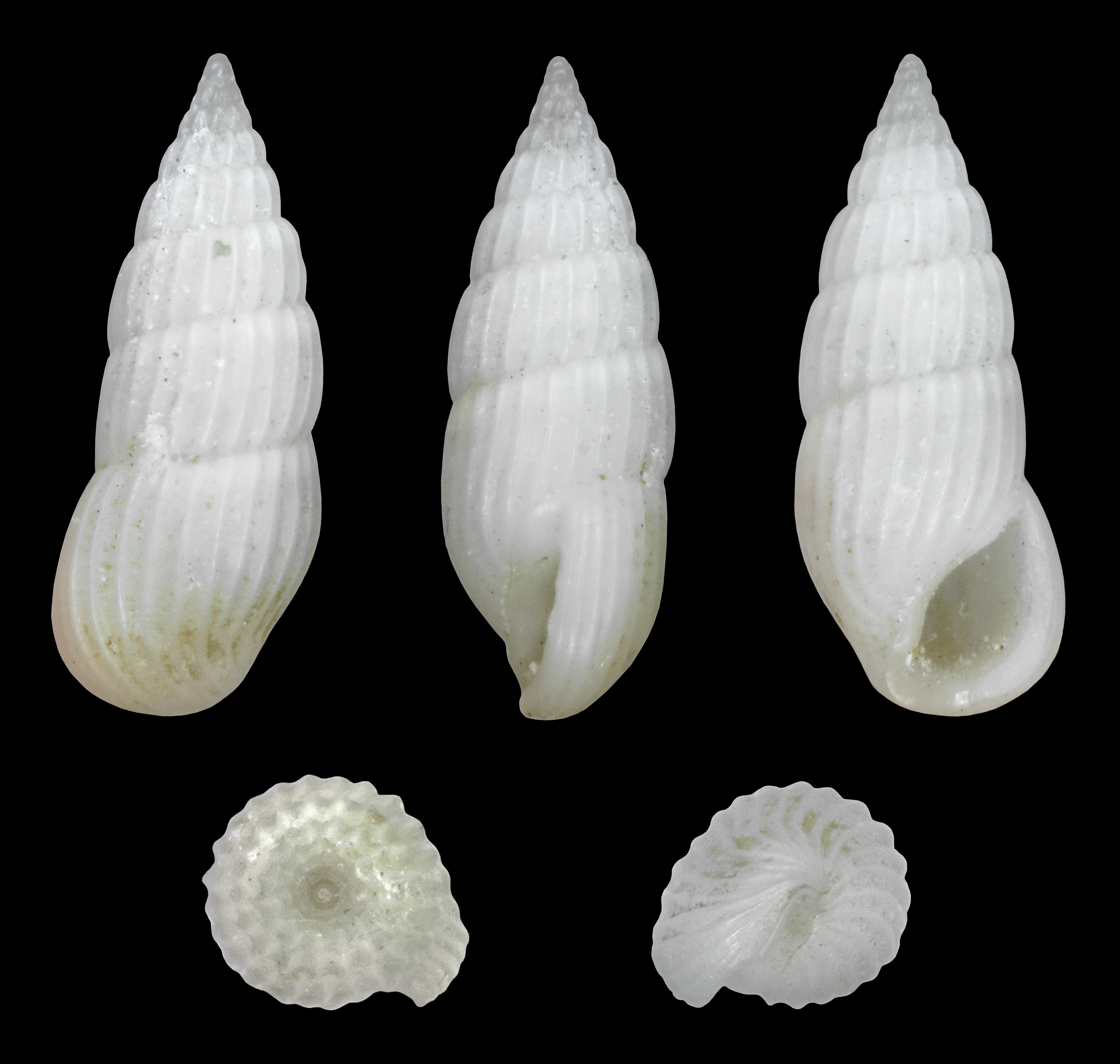
  - Shell in multiple views of a Rissoina ambigua sea snail
    †Rissoina ambigua
  - †Rissoina triticea

=== S ===
- †Scutarcopagia
  - †Scutarcopagia scobinata
- Semele
  - †Semele tita
- Septifer
  - †Septifer excisus
- Seriatopora
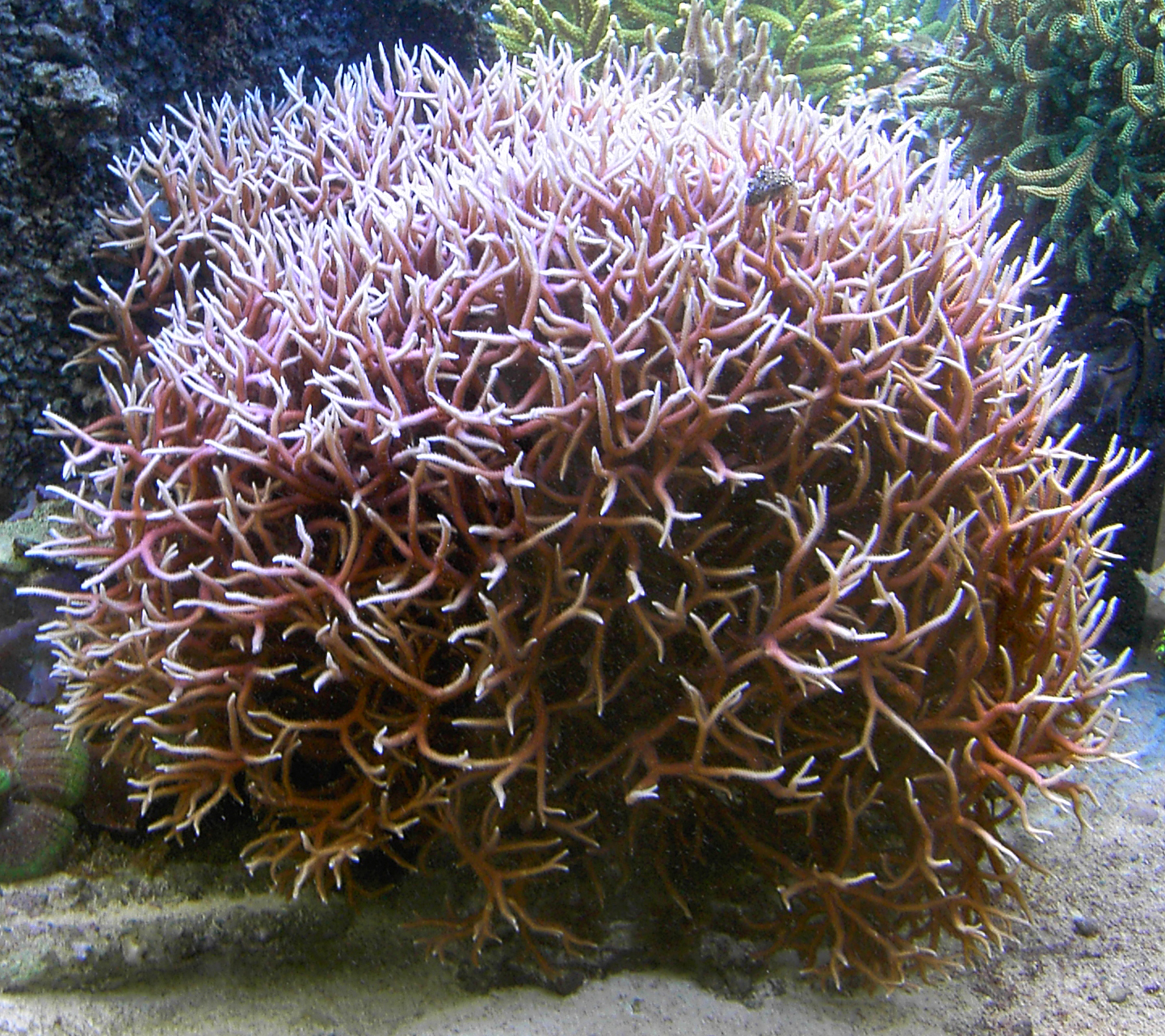
  - Living Seriatopora hystrix, or thin birdsnest coral
    †Seriatopora hystrix – or unidentified comparable form
- Spondylus
  - †Spondylus mimus
- †Spongites
- †Sporolithon
  - †Sporolithon episoredion
  - †Sporolithon molle
  - †Sporolithon ptychoides
- Staphylaea
  - †Staphylaea granulata
- Stilifer
  - †Stilifer speciosa
- Strombus
  - †Strombus aurisdianae
  - †Strombus chiragra
  - †Strombus erythrinus
  - †Strombus gibberulus
  - †Strombus helli
  - †Strombus oostergaardi
- Stylophora
  - †Stylophora gemmans
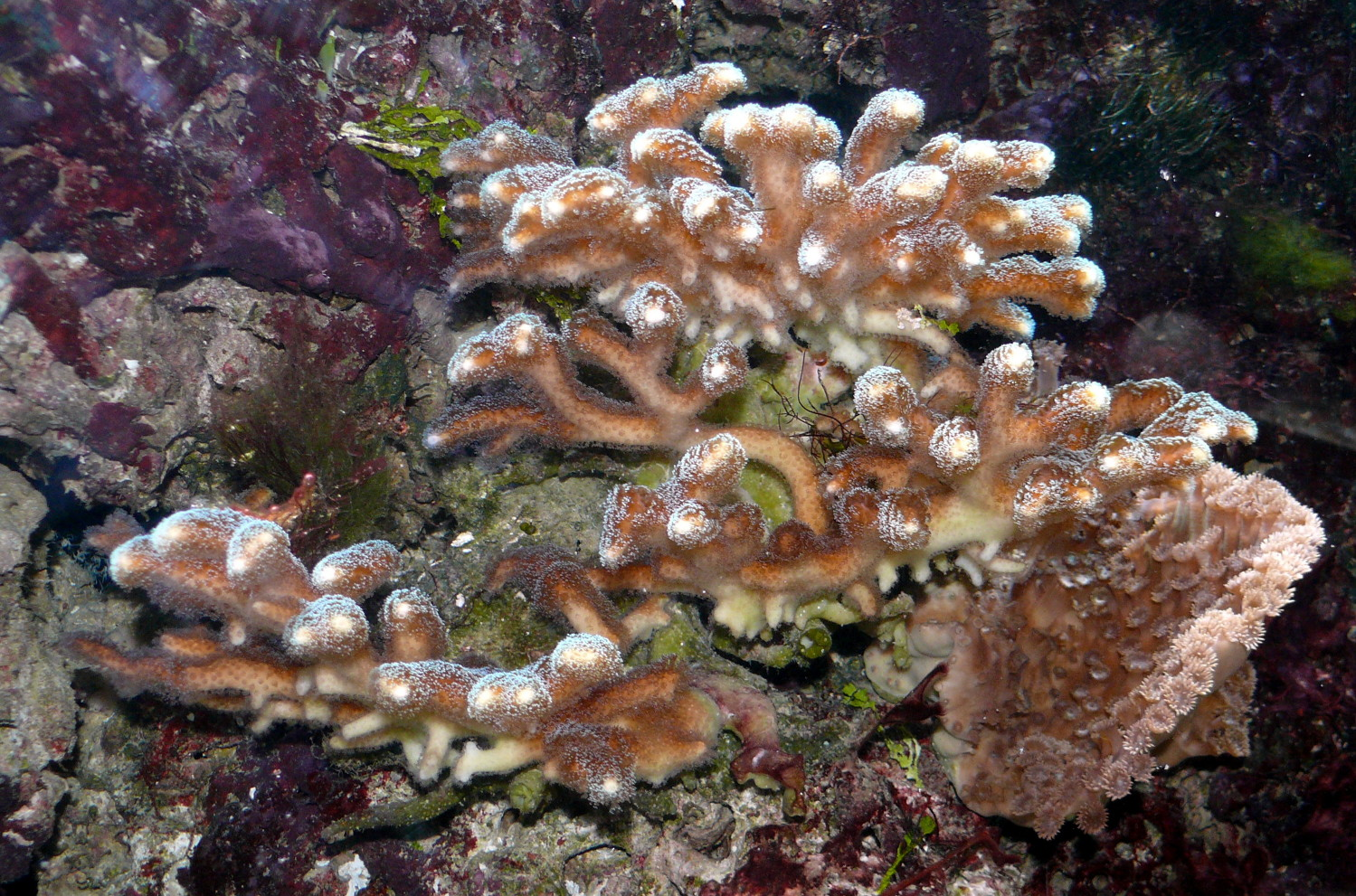
  - Living Stylophora pistillata, or hood coral
    †Stylophora pistillata

=== T ===
- Talostolida
  - †Talostolida teres
- Talparia
  - †Talparia talpa
- Tellina
  - †Tellina dispar
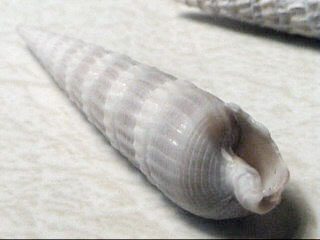
- Shell of a Terebra augur sea snail
  Terebra
  - †Terebra affinis
  - †Terebra babylon – or unidentified comparable form
  - †Terebra cerithina
  - †Terebra chlorata
  - †Terebra colume – or unidentified comparable form
  - †Terebra crenulata
  - †Terebra felina
  - †Terebra flavescens
  - †Terebra funiculata
  - †Terebra gouldi
  - †Terebra kilburnii
  - †Terebra maculata
  - †Terebra nodularis
  - †Terebra peasei
  - †Terebra undulata
- Textularia
- †Thambetochen
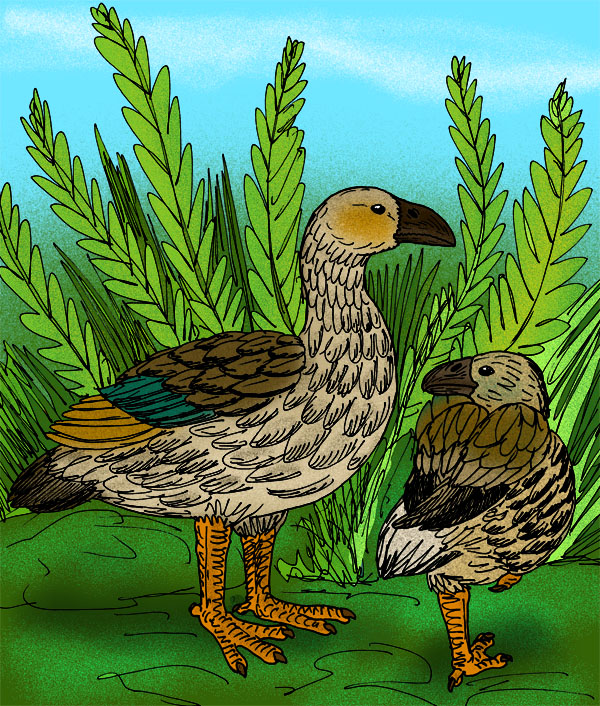
  - Life restoration of a pair of Thambetochen chauliodous, or Maui Nui large-billed moa-nalo
    †Thambetochen chauliodous
  - †Thambetochen xanion – type locality for species
- †Titanoderma
  - †Titanoderma prototypum
- Tonna
  - †Tonna perdix
- Trapezium
  - †Trapezium oblongum
- †Tridentarius
  - †Tridentarius dentatus
- Triphora
  - †Triphora cingulifera
- †Tritonoturris
  - †Tritonoturris cumingii
- Trivirostra
  - †Trivirostra hordacea
  - †Trivirostra pellucidula
- Trochus
  - †Trochus sandwichensis
- Turbo
  - †Turbo intercostalis
  - †Turbo sandwicensis
  - †Turbo setosus
- †Turridrupa
  - †Turridrupa astricta
- Turris
  - †Turris amicta
- Tutufa
  - †Tutufa bubo

=== V ===
- Vanikoro
  - †Vanikoro semiplicata
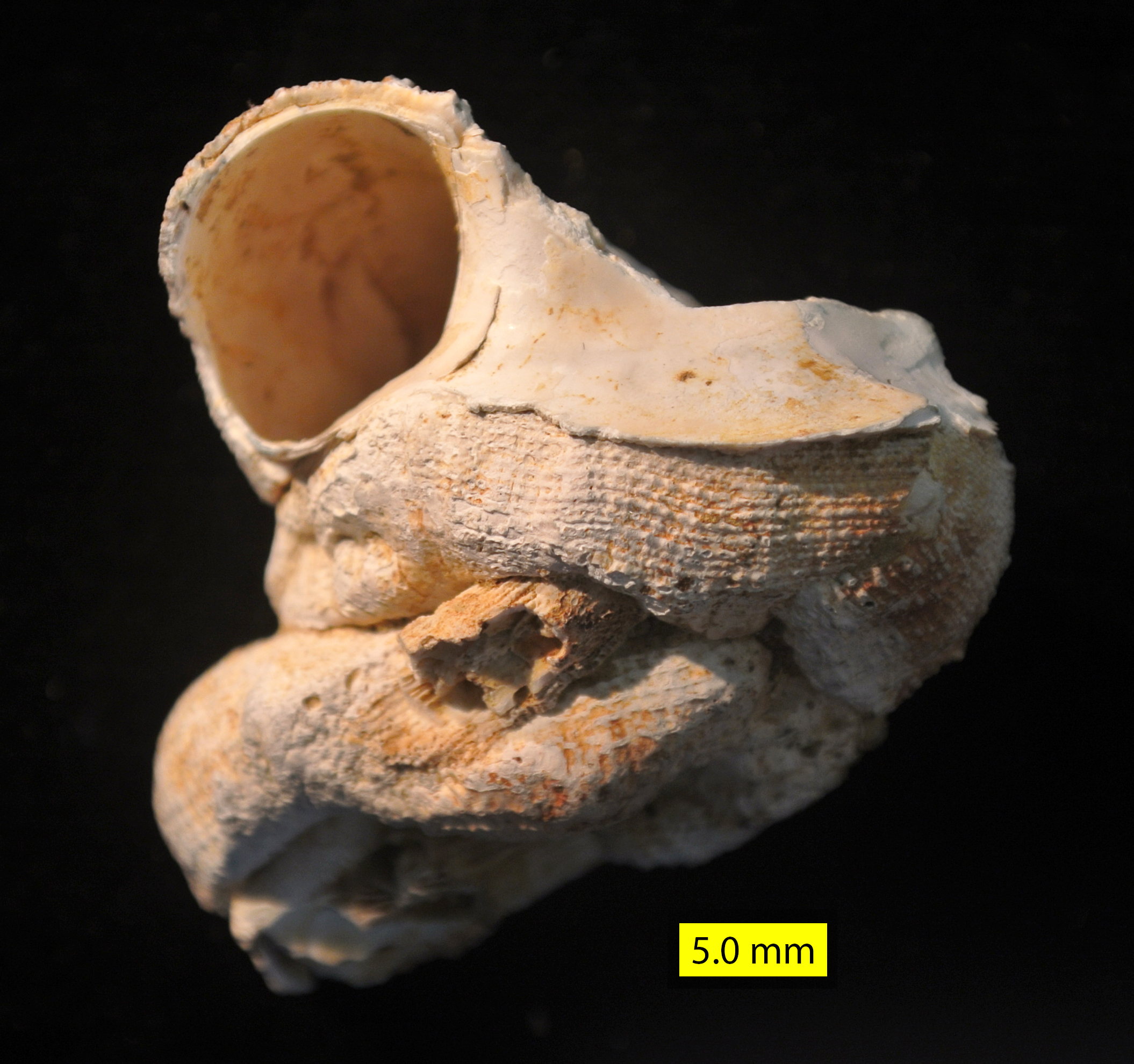
- Fossilized shell of the Jurassic-modern Vermetus, or worm shell sea snail
  Vermetus
- Vexillum
  - †Vexillum approxima
  - †Vexillum aureolata
  - †Vexillum bellum
  - †Vexillum consanguinea
  - †Vexillum nodosa
  - †Vexillum semifasciata
- Vitularia
  - †Vitularia miliaris
  - †Vitularia sandwichensis

=== X ===
- Xenoturris
  - †Xenoturris gemmuloides – or unidentified comparable form

=== Z ===
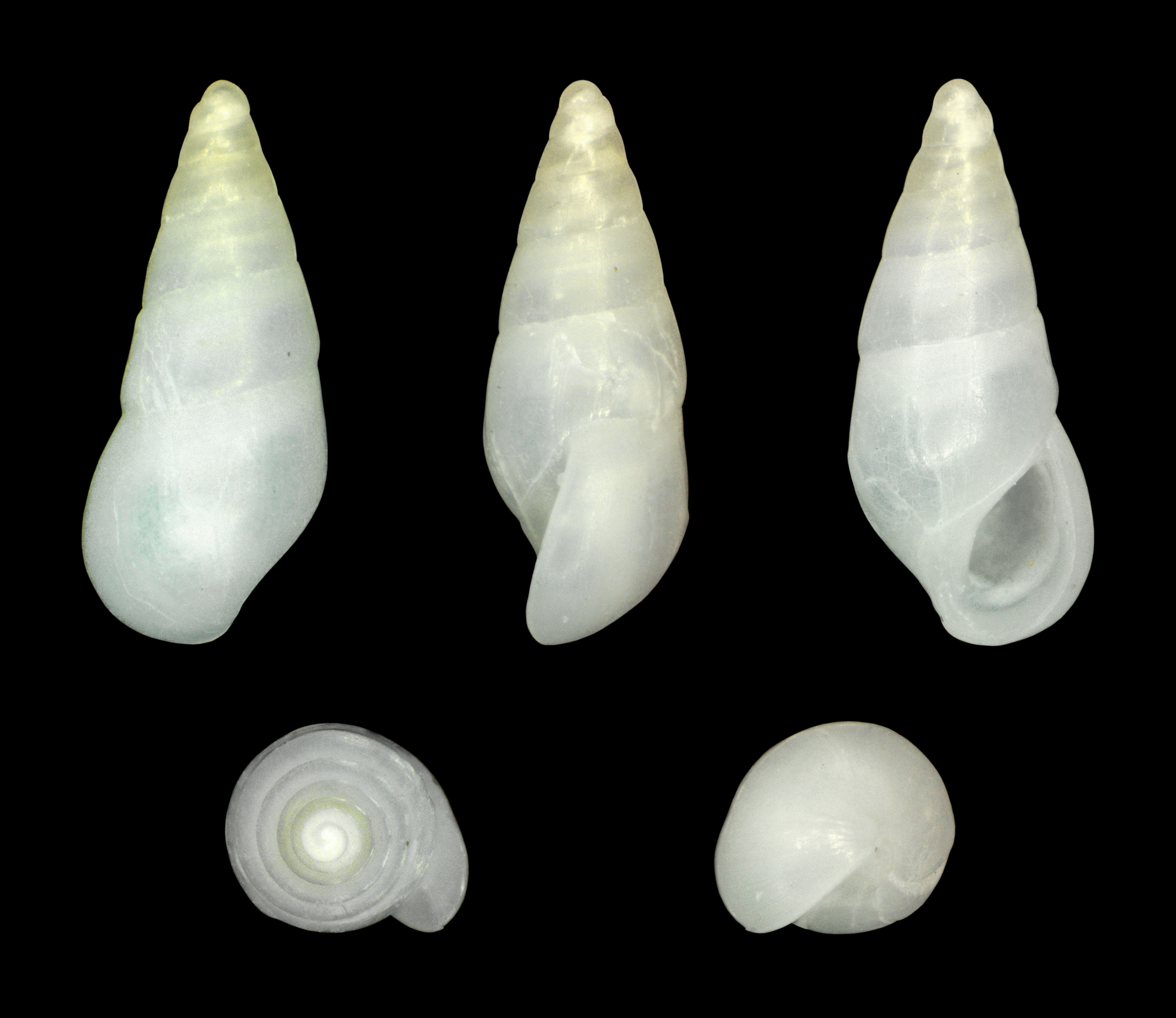
- Shell in multiple views of a Zebina sea snail
  Zebina
  - †Zebina affinis
