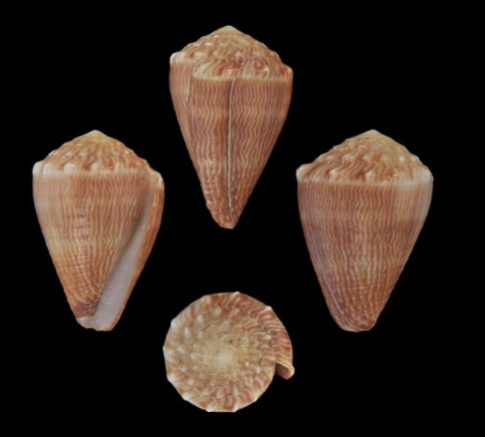
- Shells and protoconch of Conus kahiko (holotype at the Smithsonian Institution)

Conservation status
- Extinct (IUCN 3.1)

Scientific classification
- Kingdom: Animalia
- Phylum: Mollusca
- Class: Gastropoda
- Subclass: Caenogastropoda
- Order: Neogastropoda
- Superfamily: Conoidea
- Family: Conidae
- Genus: Conus
- Species: †C. kahiko

Binomial name
- †Conus kahiko Alan J. Kohn, 1980

= Conus kahiko =

Conus kahiko Temporal range: Early Holocene

Species of sea snail

Conus kahiko is an extinct species of sea snail, a marine gastropod mollusk in the family Conidae, the cone snails, cone shells or cones.

== Description ==
The mean shell length of the found specimens is 24 mm. The color of the body whorl is white or cream. The shell shows slightly wavy, dull brownish red, axial lines, some of which branch adapically. These same lines form a radiating pattern on the apex. The shell shows about 16 spiral striae. The base of the shell is dark reddish brown. The interior of the aperture is white. The shoulder shows a series of tubercles.

== Distribution ==
This marine species of cone snail has only been found as a fossil in the Early Holocene of Oahu, Hawaii. It is the only known extinct endemic Conus species of Hawaii.
