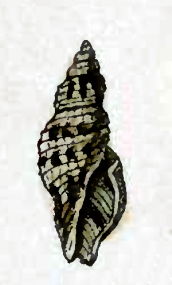
- Shell of Daphnella ornata

Scientific classification
- Kingdom: Animalia
- Phylum: Mollusca
- Class: Gastropoda
- Subclass: Caenogastropoda
- Order: Neogastropoda
- Superfamily: Conoidea
- Family: Raphitomidae
- Genus: Daphnella
- Species: D. ornata

Binomial name
- Daphnella ornata Hinds, 1844

Synonyms
- Daphnella maculosa Pease, W.H., 1860; Daphnella tessellata Garrett, A., 1873; Daphnella (Daphnella) ornata Hinds, 1844; Pseudodaphnella maculosa (Pease, 1860)

= Daphnella ornata =

Species of gastropod

Daphnella ornata is a species of sea snail, a marine gastropod mollusk in the family Raphitomidae.

== Description ==
The length of the shell varies between 6 mm and 24 mm.

The shell is cancellated with decussating striae. The sinus is rather broad. The color of the shell is pale fulvous with two revolving rows of short flames or spots of chestnut.

== Distribution ==
This marine species occurs from Japan to Hawaii, the Philippines, Paumotu Islands and off New Guinea and Queensland, Australia.
