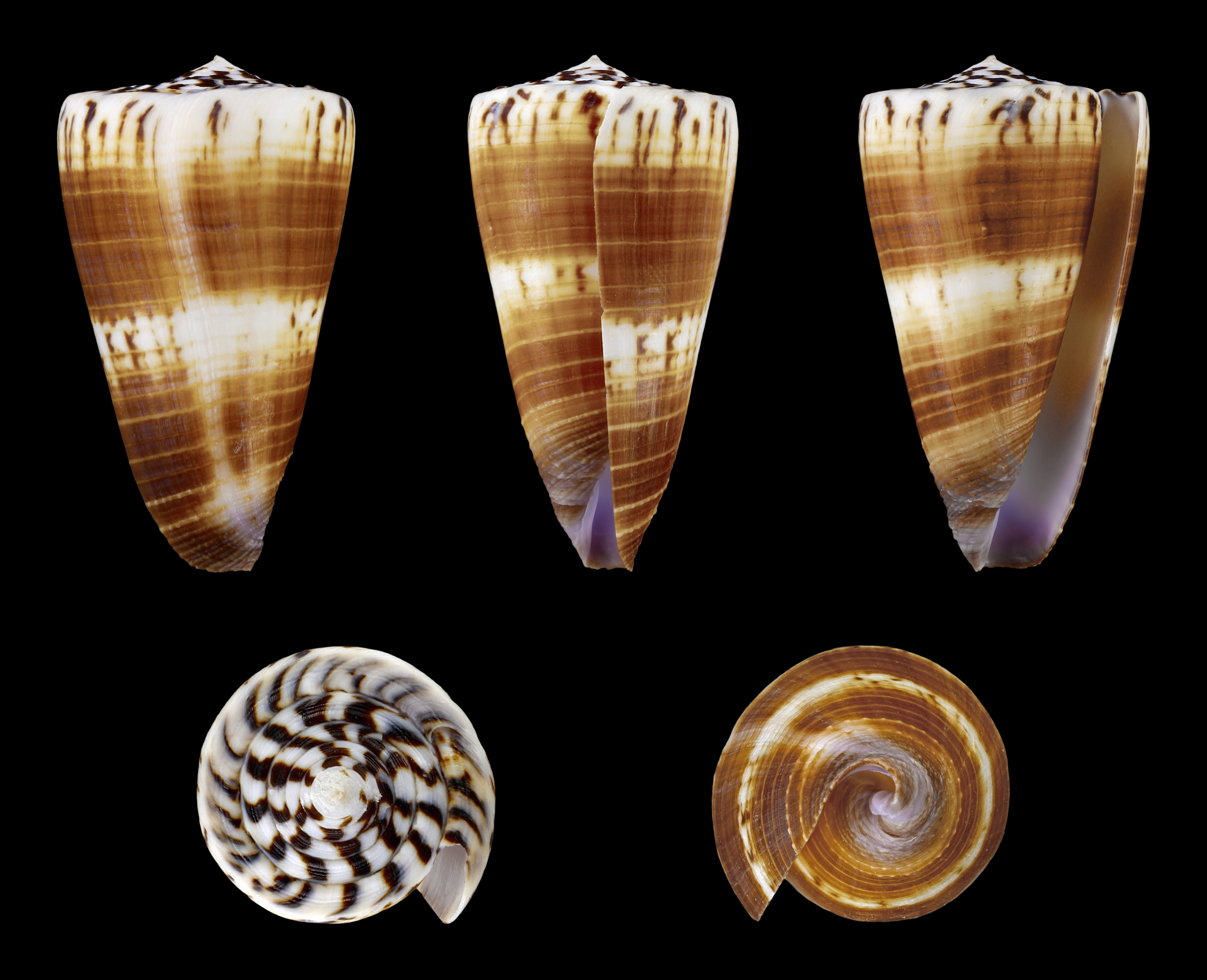
- A shell of Conus planorbis

Scientific classification
- Kingdom: Animalia
- Phylum: Mollusca
- Class: Gastropoda
- Subclass: Caenogastropoda
- Order: Neogastropoda
- Superfamily: Conoidea
- Family: Conidae
- Genus: Conus
- Species: C. planorbis

Binomial name
- Conus planorbis Born, 1778

Synonyms
- Conus (Strategoconus) planorbis Born, 1778 · accepted, alternate representation; Conus polyzonias Gmelin, 1791; Conus praeclarus Fenaux, 1942; Conus vulpinus Hwass in Bruguière, 1792; Conus vulpinus Schubert & Wagner, 1829; Dauciconus planorbis Habe, 1964; Vituliconus planorbis (Born, 1778)

= Conus planorbis =

Species of sea snail

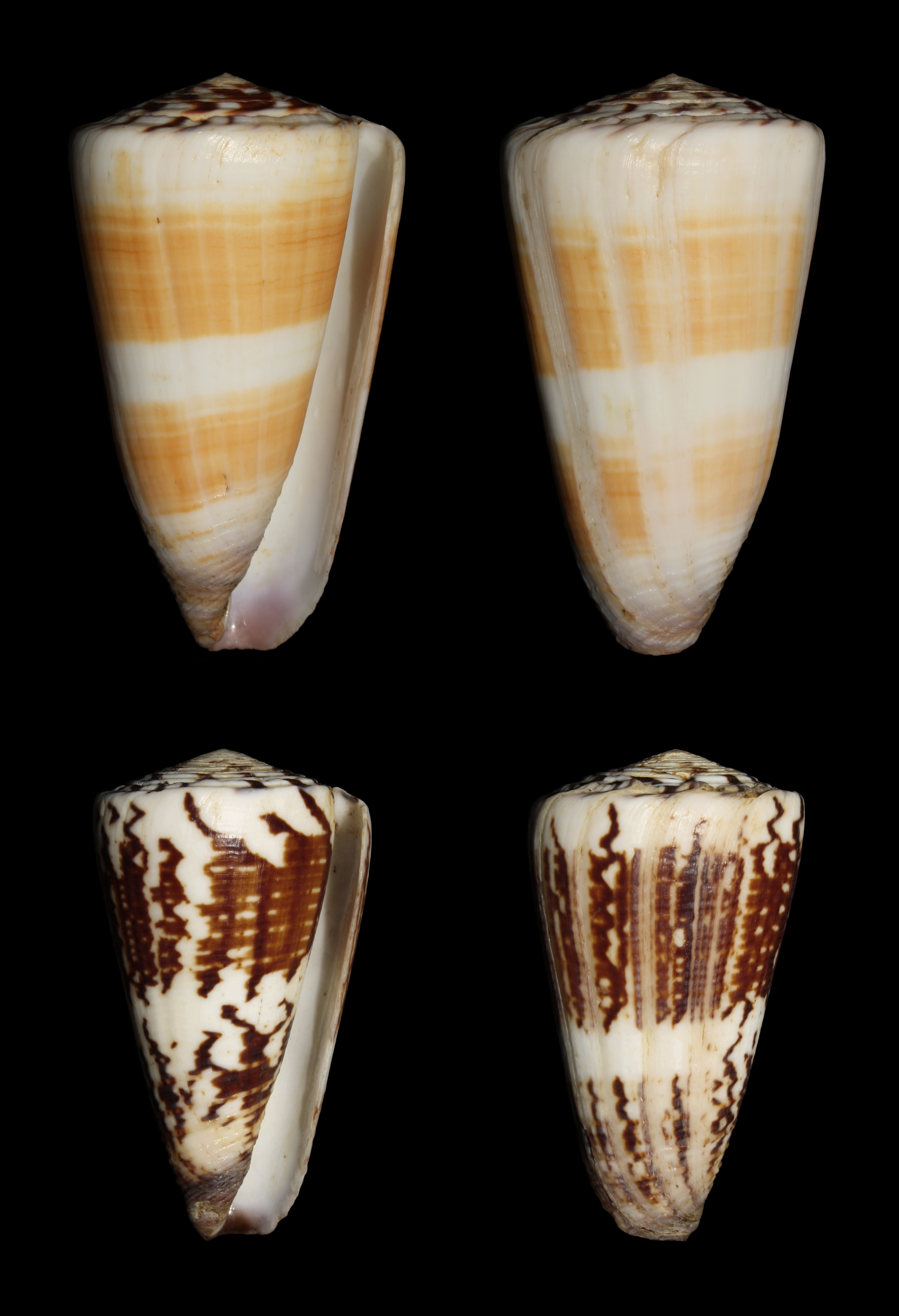
Conus planorbis and Conus vitulinus

Conus planorbis, its common name being the planorbis cone or the ringed cone, is a species of sea snail, a marine gastropod mollusk in the family Conidae, the cone snails and their allies.

Like all species within the genus Conus, these snails are predatory and venomous. They are capable of stinging humans; therefore, live ones should be handled carefully or not at all.

== Description ==
The size of the shell varies between 26.1 mm and 82 mm. The whorls of the spire are striate, maculate with chestnut. The body whorl shows beaded striae below. Sometimes, the granular striae cover the entire surface. It is orange-brown or chestnut, frequently light-banded in the middle, and sometimes at the shoulder also. Its base is darker-colored.

== Distribution ==
This marine species is found in the Red Sea, the Indian Ocean off Madagascar, the Seychelles, the Mascarene Islands, the Indo-West Pacific, and Oceania; it is also found off Australia (in the Northern Territory, Queensland and Western Australia).
