= Nassarius crematus =

Scientific classification
- Kingdom: Animalia
- Phylum: Mollusca
- Class: Gastropoda
- Subclass: Caenogastropoda
- Order: Neogastropoda
- Family: Nassariidae
- Genus: Nassarius
- Species: N. crematus

Binomial name
- Nassarius crematus (Hinds, 1844)

Synonyms
- Nassa (Niotha) eucomista Melvill & Standen, 1897; Nassa cremata Hinds, 1844; Nassa crenata Hinds, 1844; Nassa crenata var. scutulata Mari, 1934; Nassa euglypta G.B. Sowerby III, 1914; Nassa martensi Thiele, 1925; Nassa pulcherrima Marrat, 1877; Nassa quadrata Marrat, 1880; Nassa ranida A. Adams, 1852; Nassa ravida A. Adams, 1852; Nassarius (Hinia) kueneni Koperberg, 1931; Nassarius (Hinia) kurodai Makiyama, 1927; Nassarius (Zeuxis) crematus (Hinds, 1844)

Species of gastropod

Nassarius crematus, common name the burned nassa, is a species of sea snail, a marine gastropod mollusc in the family Nassariidae, the Nassa mud snails or dog whelks. Nassarius crematus was first described by Richard Brinsley Hinds in 1844 on a voyage in the H.M.S. Sulphur.

== Description ==
The length of the shell varies between 13 mm and 41 mm. The shell is round and bulbous, with four spires at its top. In many specimens, the outer lip is very large, and the palatal wall takes up most of its front.

== Distribution ==
This species occurs in the Indian Ocean off Tanzania and the Mascarene Basin; in the Southwest Pacific, off the Philippines and New Guinea and off Japan. It has also been found off the coasts of Hawaii, China, Malaysia, and Thailand.
