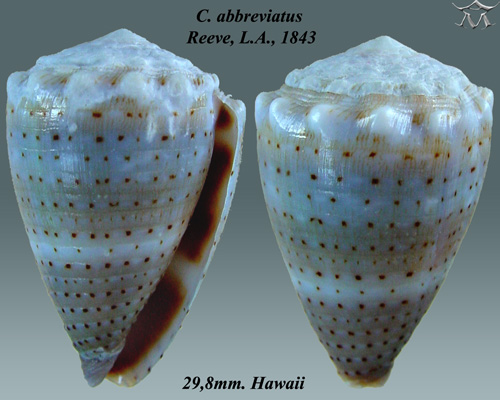
- Apertural and abapertural views of shell of Conus abbreviatus Reeve, L.A., 1843
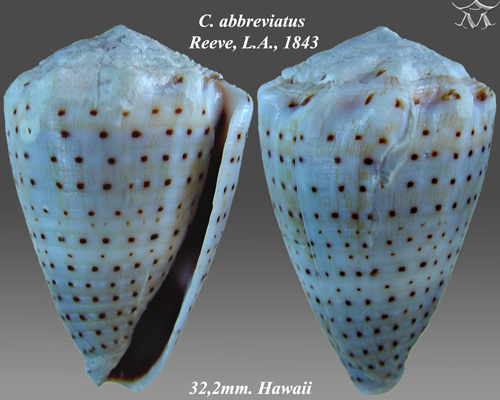

Conservation status
- Least Concern (IUCN 3.1)

Scientific classification
- Kingdom: Animalia
- Phylum: Mollusca
- Class: Gastropoda
- Subclass: Caenogastropoda
- Order: Neogastropoda
- Superfamily: Conoidea
- Family: Conidae
- Genus: Conus
- Species: C. abbreviatus

Binomial name
- Conus abbreviatus Reeve, 1843

Synonyms
- Conus (Virroconus) abbreviatus Reeve, 1843 accepted, alternate representation; Miliariconus abbreviatus (Reeve, 1843)

= Conus abbreviatus =

Species of sea snail

Conus abbreviatus, common name Abbreviated cone snail, is a species of sea snail, a marine gastropod mollusk in the family Conidae, the cone snails and their allies.

Like all species within the genus Conus, these snails are predatory and venomous. They are capable of stinging humans, therefore live ones should be handled carefully.

== Description ==
The shell of this species has spots which are more distant from one another and somewhat more regularly disposed than in Conus miliaris.

== Distribution ==
This species occurs off the Hawaiian Islands.

40 feet depth, on coral sand.

== Ecology ==
Like all species within the genus Conus, these snails are predatory and venomous. They are capable of stinging humans, therefore live ones should be handled carefully or not at all.
