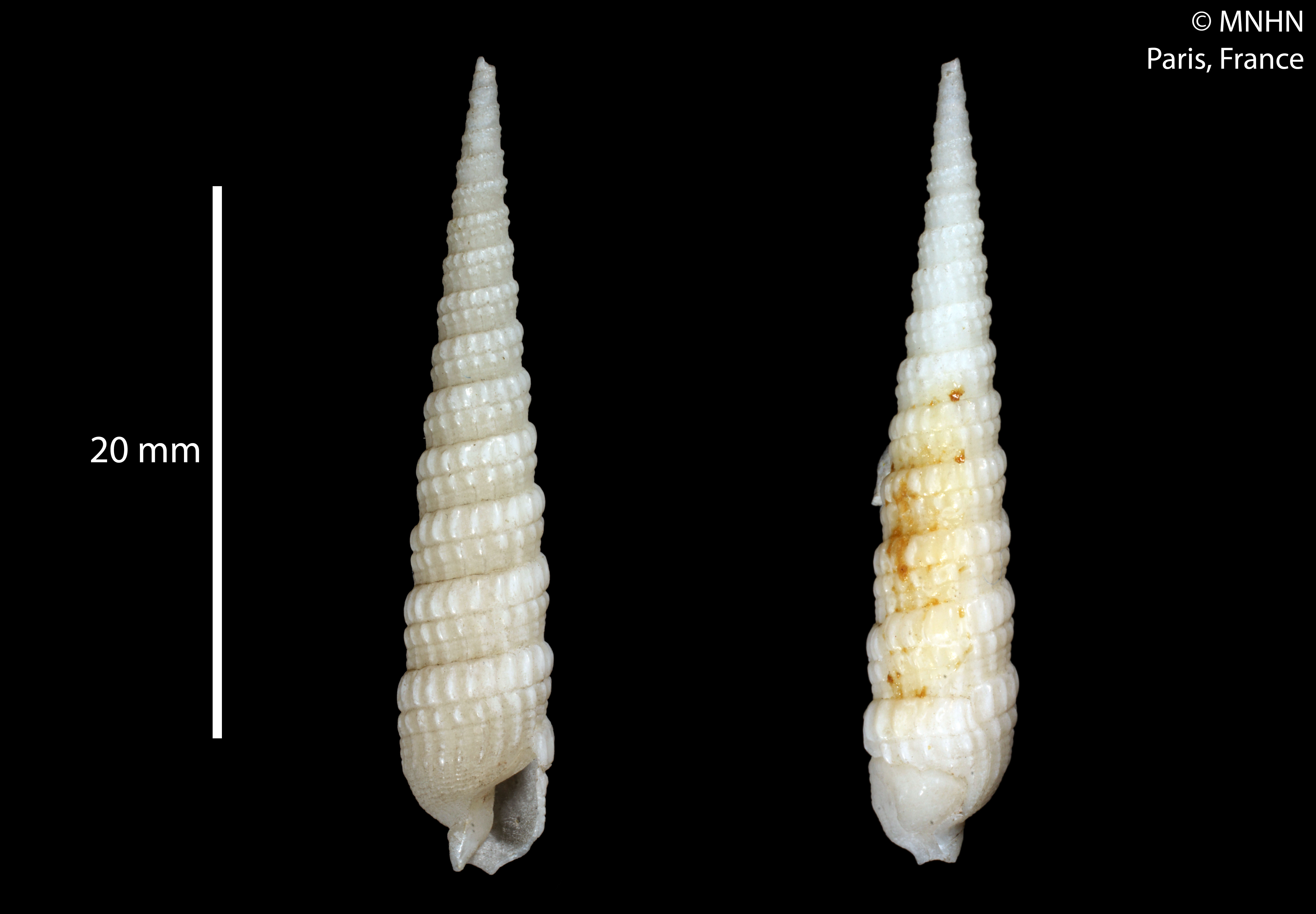
- Shell of Terebra nodularis (paralectotype at MNHN, Paris)

Scientific classification
- Kingdom: Animalia
- Phylum: Mollusca
- Class: Gastropoda
- Subclass: Caenogastropoda
- Order: Neogastropoda
- Family: Terebridae
- Genus: Terebra
- Species: T. nodularis

Binomial name
- Terebra nodularis Deshayes, 1859

= Terebra nodularis =

Species of gastropod

Terebra nodularis is a species of sea snail, a marine gastropod mollusc in the family Terebridae, the auger snails.

== Distribution ==
This marine species occurs off Hawaii.
