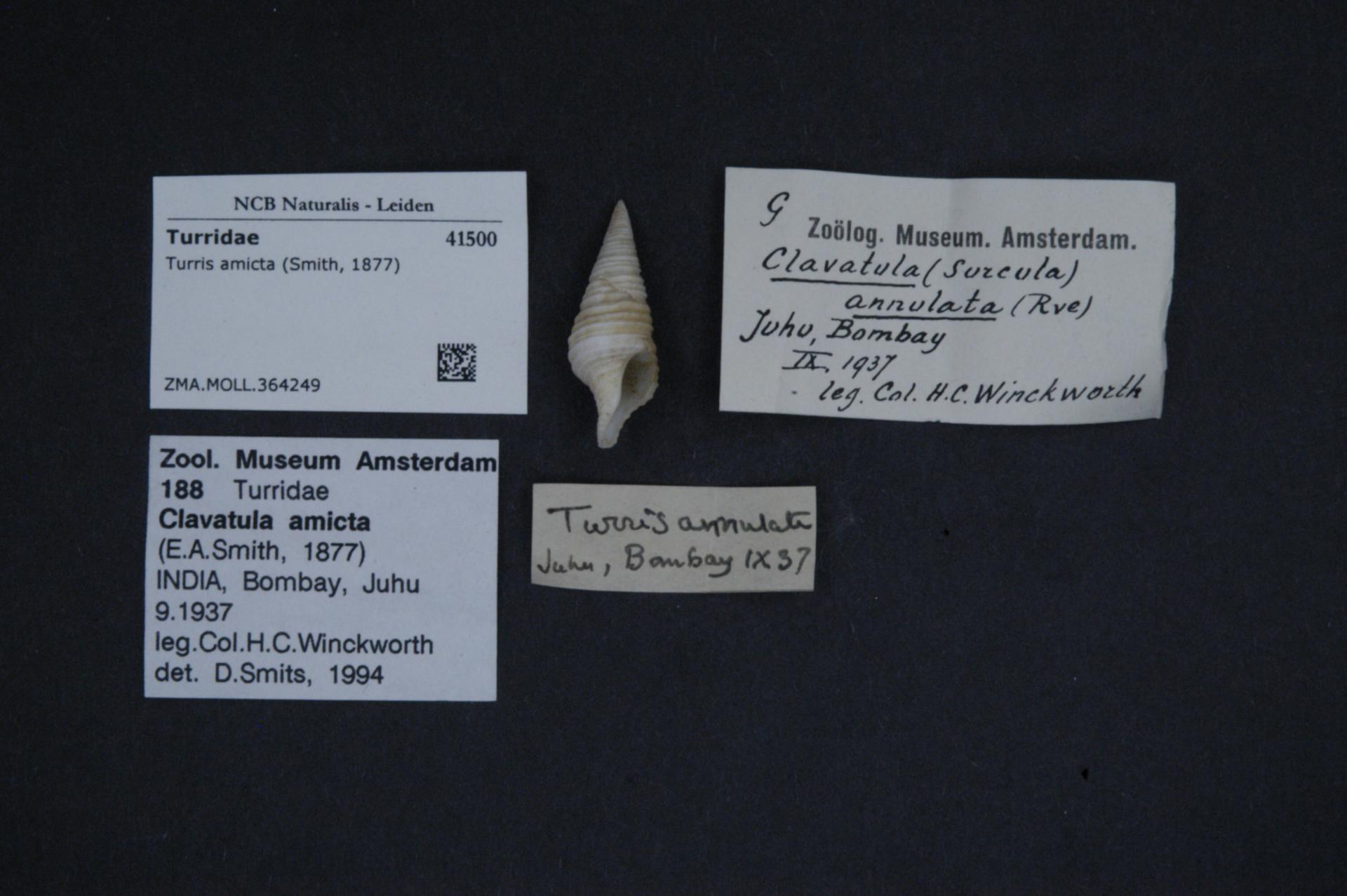
- Shell of Turris amicta (specimen at Naturalis Biodiversity Center)

Scientific classification
- Kingdom: Animalia
- Phylum: Mollusca
- Class: Gastropoda
- Subclass: Caenogastropoda
- Order: Neogastropoda
- Family: Turridae
- Genus: Turris
- Species: T. amicta

Binomial name
- Turris amicta (E. A. Smith, 1877)

Synonyms
- Clavatula amicta Smith E. A., 1877; Pleurotoma amicta Smith E. A., 1877; Surcula amicta (E. A. Smith, 1877)

= Turris amicta =

Species of gastropod

Turris amicta is a species of sea snail, a marine gastropod mollusk in the family Turridae, the turrids.

== Description ==
The length of the shell varies between 45 mm and 65 mm.

The solid shell has a fusiform shape. The shell is uniform white with a yellowish-olive periostracum. It contains 14-15 whorls, flat-sided and rather deep. The aperture is small with the inside slightly lirate. The short siphonal canal is slightly flexed to the right and recurved. The inner lip is narrow and crenulate at the margin. The left-handed columella is tortuous and suboblique.

This species is remarkable for the numerous subequal keels or spiral lirations, none of them being very large. A double one a little above the middle of the whorls has above and below it a very peculiar style of sculpturing, consisting of a kind of puckering of a very short and oblique thread-like lines.

== Distribution ==
This marine species occurs off Pakistan, India, Sri Lanka; also off Hawaii
