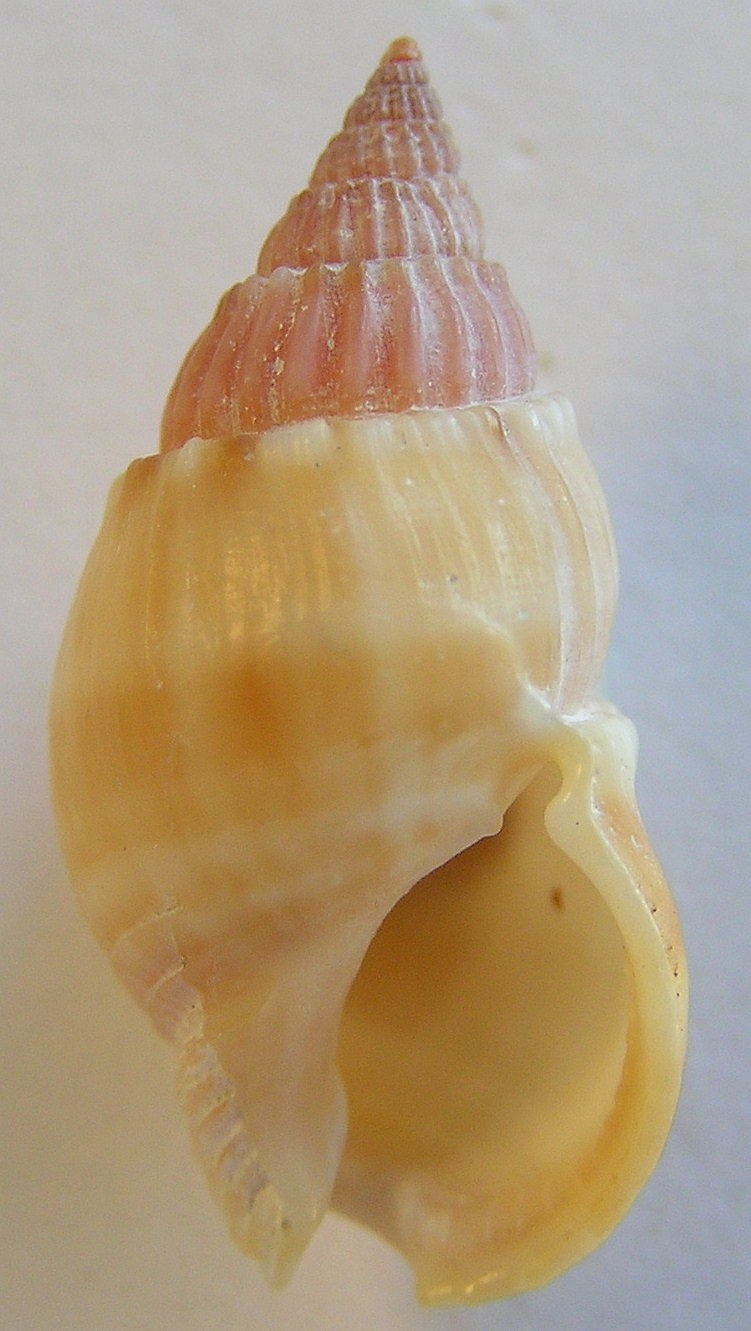
- Apertural view of a shell of Nassarius hirtus

Scientific classification
- Kingdom: Animalia
- Phylum: Mollusca
- Class: Gastropoda
- Subclass: Caenogastropoda
- Order: Neogastropoda
- Family: Nassariidae
- Genus: Nassarius
- Species: N. hirtus

Binomial name
- Nassarius hirtus (Kiener, 1834)

Synonyms
- Buccinum hirtum Kiener, 1834 (original combination); Nassa (Alectrion) seminodosa A. Adams, 1852; Nassarius (Alectrion) hirtus (Kiener, 1834) · accepted, alternate representation

= Nassarius hirtus =

Species of gastropod

Nassarius hirtus, common name the rough nassa, is a species of sea snail, a marine gastropod mollusc in the family Nassariidae, the Nassa mud snails or dog whelks.

== Description ==
The length of the shell attains 30 mm. The shell is ovate, conical and subturreted. The spire is pointed. The sutures are deep, ornamented in its whole extent, with projecting longitudinal ribs, slightly oblique, pointed at their summit, raised and continued upon the lowest whorls which they crown. These whorls are more convex. The ribs of the lowest gradually disappear with age. At the base of this body whorl are observed also ridges, and very prominent granulations. The aperture is subrotund, white, emarginated and narrowed at the top by a transverse fold of the left lip, and by an angle of the outer lip. The outer lip tis hick, accompanied at its external part, by a very apparent margin, and furnished internally with numerous fine striae. The external color of this species exhibits a reddish ground, with irregular spots, and transverse lines of a deeper tint. The band which surrounds the middle of the body whorl is much wider and darker colored.

== Distribution ==
This marine species occurs off Hawaii and Polynesia.
