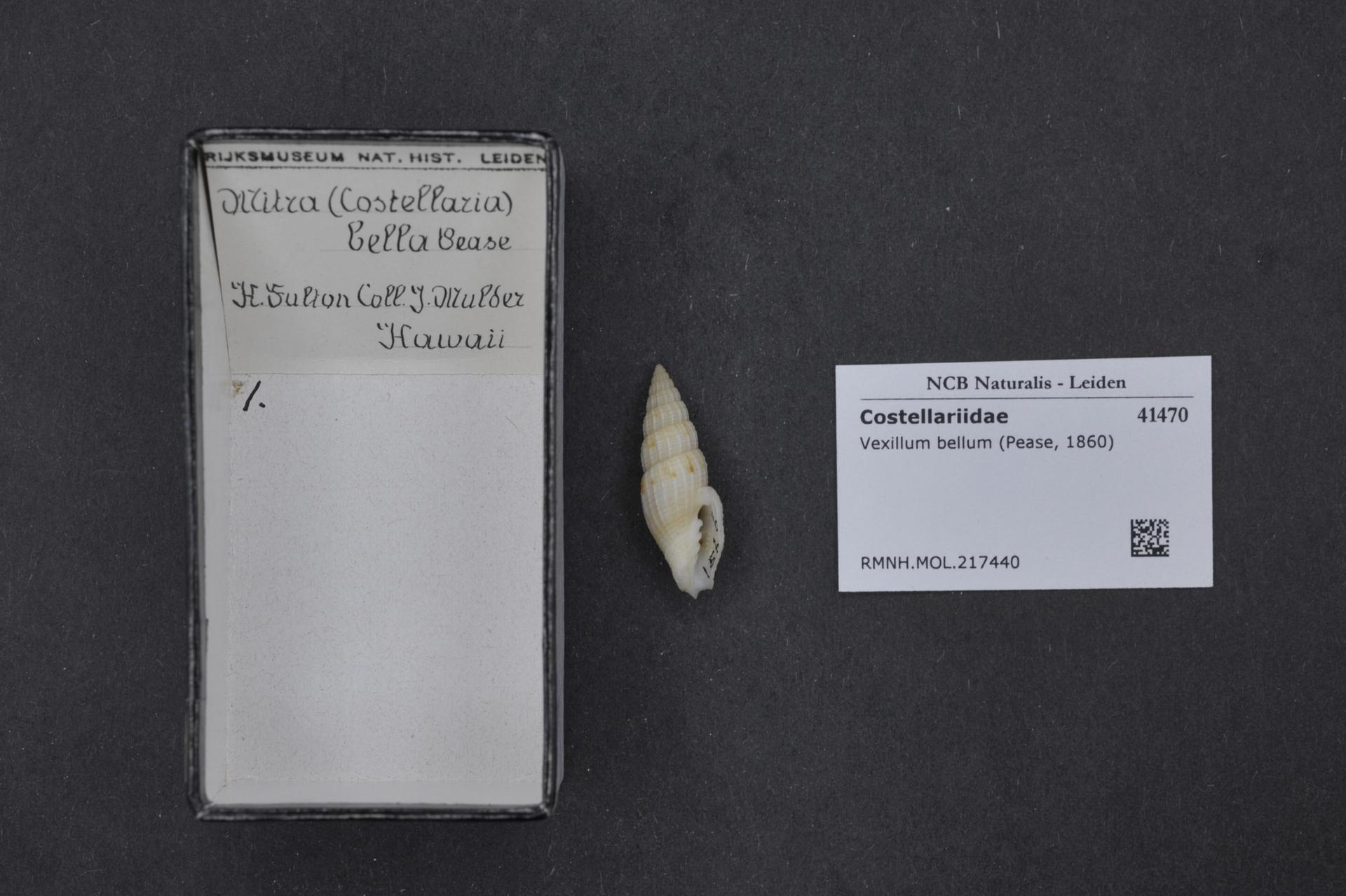
- Vexillum bellum (specimen at Naturalis Biodiversity Center)

Scientific classification
- Kingdom: Animalia
- Phylum: Mollusca
- Class: Gastropoda
- Subclass: Caenogastropoda
- Order: Neogastropoda
- Superfamily: Turbinelloidea
- Family: Costellariidae
- Genus: Vexillum
- Species: V. bellum

Binomial name
- Vexillum bellum (Pease, 1860)

Synonyms
- Turricula bella Pease, 1860 ·; Vexillum (Costellaria) bellum (Pease, 1860)

= Vexillum bellum =

Species of gastropod

Vexillum bellum is a species of small sea snail, marine gastropod mollusk in the family Costellariidae, the ribbed miters.

== Description ==
The length of the shell attains 19 mm.

(Original description) The shell is fusiform. The spire is acuminated. The whorls are convexly angulated. The suturės are rather deep and longitudinally ribbed. The ribs are somewhat angular, irregular in size and finely striated longitudinally, also the interstices, and crossed by numerous transverse striae. The base of the shell is slightly recurved. The columella is four-plaited with a callosity posteriorly. The aperture is lyrated within. The colour of the shell is light chestnut brown, with broad lighter or whitish bands, and spotted remotely and irregularly with reddish brown. The base is white.

== Distribution ==
This marine species occurs off the Philippines and Hawaii.
