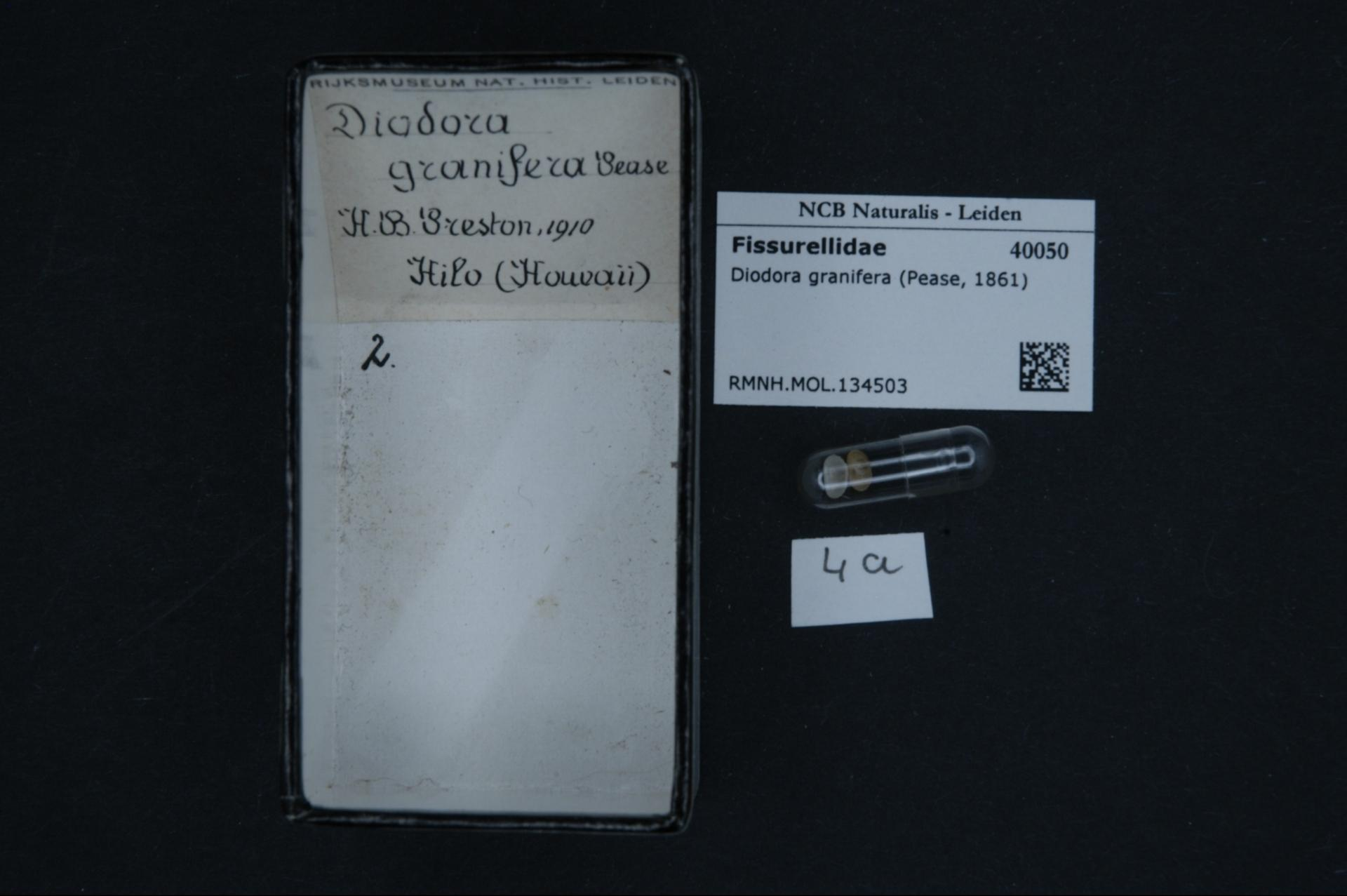
- Diodora granifera

Scientific classification
- Kingdom: Animalia
- Phylum: Mollusca
- Class: Gastropoda
- Subclass: Vetigastropoda
- Order: Lepetellida
- Family: Fissurellidae
- Subfamily: Fissurellinae
- Genus: Diodora
- Species: D. granifera

Binomial name
- Diodora granifera (Pease, 1861)

Synonyms
- Fissurella granifera Pease, 1861

= Diodora granifera =

Species of gastropod

Diodora granifera is a species of sea snail, a marine gastropod mollusk in the family Fissurellidae, the keyhole limpets and slit limpets.
