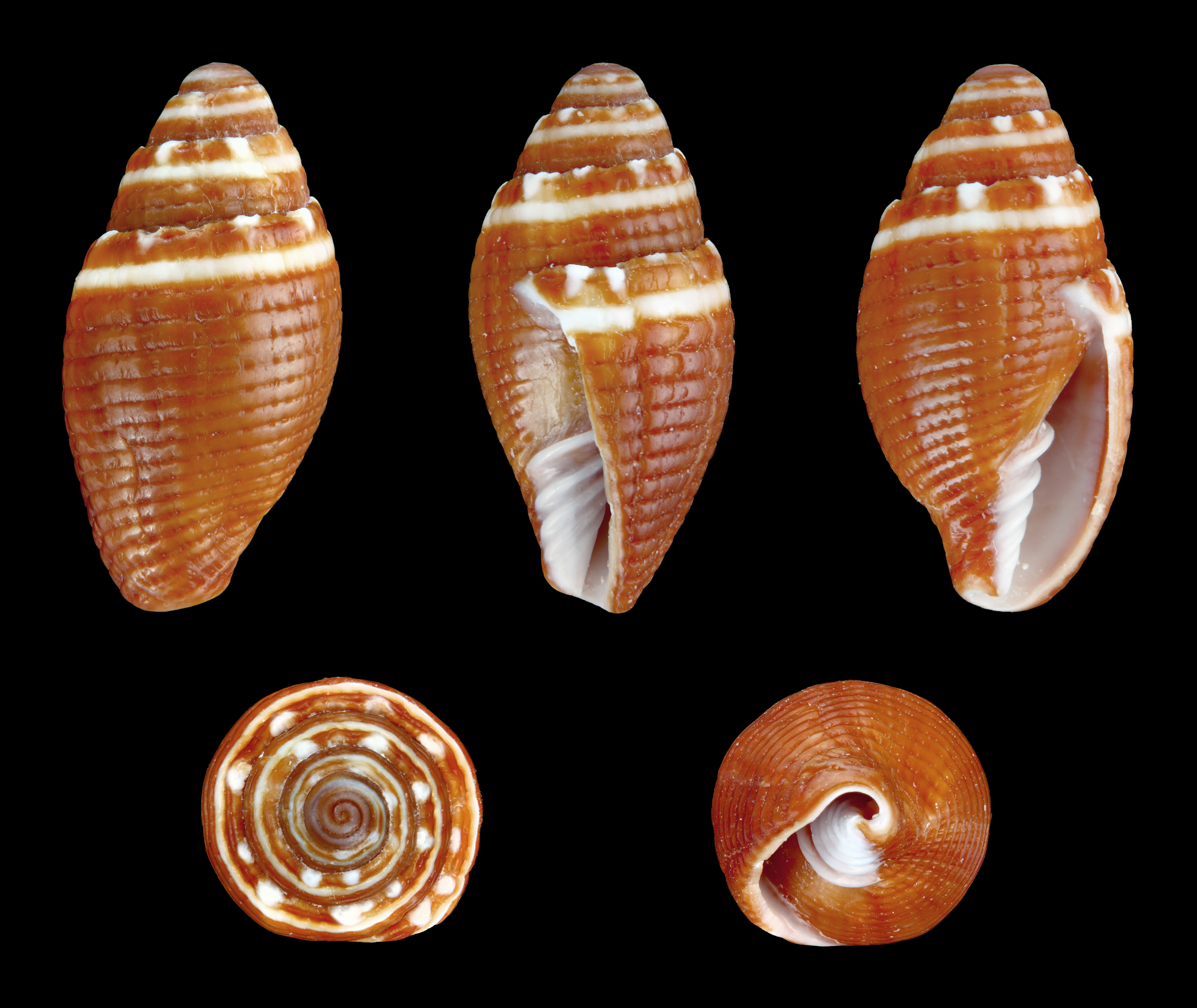
- Strigatella coronata

Scientific classification
- Kingdom: Animalia
- Phylum: Mollusca
- Class: Gastropoda
- Subclass: Caenogastropoda
- Order: Neogastropoda
- Superfamily: Mitroidea
- Family: Mitridae
- Subfamily: Strigatellinae
- Genus: Strigatella; Swainson, 1840

Type species
- Strigatella zebra (Lamarck, 1811)

Species
- See text

Synonyms
- Chrysame H. Adams & A. Adams, 1853; Mitra (Chrysame) H. Adams & A. Adams, 1853 (synonym); Mitra (Phaeomitra) E. von Martens, 1880; Mitra (Strigatella) Swainson, 1840 (original rank)

= Strigatella =

Genus of gastropods

Strigatella is a genus of sea snails, marine gastropod mollusks in the subfamily Strigatellinae of the family Mitridae.

== Species ==
Species within the genus Strigatella include:

- Strigatella abacophora (Melvill, 1888)
- Strigatella amaura (Hervier, 1897)
- Strigatella ambigua (Swainson, 1829)
- Strigatella assimilis (Pease, 1868)
- Strigatella aurantia (Gmelin, 1791)
- Strigatella auriculoides (Reeve, 1845)
- Strigatella aurora (Dohrn, 1861)
- Strigatella coffea (Schubert & J. A. Wagner, 1829)
- Strigatella colombelliformis (Kiener, 1838)
- Strigatella coronadoensis F. Baker & Spicer, 1930
- Strigatella coronata (Lamarck, 1811)
- Strigatella crassicostata (G. B. Sowerby II, 1874)
- Strigatella decurtata (Reeve, 1844)
- Strigatella fasciolaris (Deshayes, 1833)
- Strigatella flavocingulata (Lamy, 1938)
- Strigatella fulvescens (Broderip, 1836)
- Strigatella holkosa (Broderip, 1836)
- Strigatella imperialis (Röding, 1798)
- Strigatella litterata (Lamarck, 1811)
- Strigatella luctuosa (A. Adams, 1853)
- Strigatella lugubris (Swainson, 1821)
- Strigatella nana (Reeve, 1844)
- Strigatella obliqua (Lesson, 1842)
- Strigatella paupercula (Linnaeus, 1758)
- Strigatella pica (Dillwyn, 1817)
- Strigatella pudica (Dillwyn, 1817)
- Strigatella retusa (Lamarck, 1811)
- Strigatella scutulata (Gmelin, 1791)
- Strigatella subruppelli (Gmelin, 1791)
- Strigatella tabida (Herrmann & R. Salisbury, 2013)
- Strigatella telescopium (Reeve, 1844)
- Strigatella testacea (Broderip, 1836)
- Strigatella ticaonica (Reeve, 1844)
- Strigatella tristis (Broderip, 1836)
- Strigatella vexillum (Reeve, 1844)
- Strigatella vultuosa (Reeve, 1844)
- Strigatella zebra (Lamarck, 1811)

Species brought into synonymy

- Strigatella acuminata (Swainson, 1824): synonym of Nebularia acuminata (Swainson, 1824)
- Strigatella bellula (A. Adams, 1853): synonym of Nebularia bellula (A. Adams, 1853)
- Strigatella brunnea Pease, 1868: synonym of Strigatella fastigium (Reeve, 1845): synonym of Nebularia fastigium (Reeve, 1845)
- Strigatella buryi (Melvill & Sykes, 1899): synonym of Mitra chrysalis Reeve, 1844: synonym of Pseudonebularia chrysalis (Reeve, 1844)
- Strigatella catalinae Dall, 1919: synonym of Atrimitra catalinae (Dall, 1919) (original combination)
- Strigatella chrysostoma (Broderip, 1836) : synonym of Nebularia chrysostoma (Broderip, 1836)
- Strigatella crassa (Swainson, 1822): synonym of Mitra aurantia (Gmelin, 1791): synonym of Strigatella aurantia (Gmelin, 1791)
- Strigatella fastigium (Reeve, 1845): synonym of Nebularia fastigium (Reeve, 1845)
- Strigatella georgi F. Nordsieck, 1975: synonym of Pusia zebrina (d'Orbigny, 1840) (synonym)
- Strigatella nigricans (Pease, 1865): synonym of Nebularia luctuosa (A. Adams, 1853): synonym of Strigatella luctuosa (A. Adams, 1853)
- Strigatella nitilina Spry, 1961: synonym of Mitra fastigium Reeve, 1845: synonym of Nebularia fastigium (Reeve, 1845)
- Strigatella oleacea (Reeve, 1844): synonym of Zierliana oleacea (Reeve, 1844): synonym of Vexillum oleacea (Reeve, 1844)
- Strigatella peculiaris (Reeve, 1845): synonym of Carinomitra peculiaris (Reeve, 1845)
- Strigatella pellisserpentis (Reeve, 1844): synonym of Nebularia pellisserpentis (Reeve, 1844)
- Strigatella picea Pease, 1860: synonym of Vexillum piceum (Pease, 1860) (original combination)
- Strigatella typha (Reeve, 1845): synonym of Carinomitra typha (Reeve, 1845)
- Strigatella virgata (Reeve, 1844): synonym of Strigatella retusa f. virgata (Reeve, 1844): synonym of Strigatella retusa (Lamarck, 1811)

The synonymized genus Chrysame contains the uncertain species Chrysame pertusa (Linnaeus, 1758) (nomen dubium).
