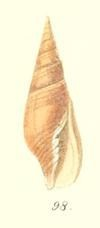
- Sowerby's illustration accompanying Reeve's 1844 description.

Scientific classification
- Kingdom: Animalia
- Phylum: Mollusca
- Class: Gastropoda
- Subclass: Caenogastropoda
- Order: Neogastropoda
- Family: Mitridae
- Genus: Strigatella
- Species: S. testacea

Binomial name
- Strigatella testacea Broderip, 1836

Synonyms
- Mitra antoni Dohrn, 1860; Mitra testacea Broderip, 1836

= Strigatella testacea =

Species of gastropod

Strigatella testacea is a species of sea snail, a marine gastropod mollusk in the family Mitridae, the miters or miter snails.

== Taxonomy ==
William Broderip described the species as Mitra testacea in 1836; the holotype had been collected by Hugh Cuming.

Heinrich Wolfgang Ludwig Dohrn described M. antoni in 1860 from a specimen also in Cuming's collection. Dohrn classified this species as a junior synonym of M. testacea in 1861. Dohrn's M. antoni should not be confused with M. antonii Küster, 1839, sometimes taken to be its senior homonym.

George Washington Tryon proposed that both M. bulimoides Reeve, 1844 and M. badia Reeve, 1844 are junior synonyms of M. testacea, but this has not been accepted.

Walter O. Cernohorsky proposed that M. obliqua Lesson, 1842 was a junior synonym of M. testacea, but this also has not been accepted.

== Distribution ==
It has been found in the Kingsmill Islands, Cook Islands, Society Islands, Tuamotu Islands, Gambier Islands, and the Pitcairn Islands.

== Description ==
Its shell is a light reddish brown color, and can grow to a length of 32 mm (1.3 in).
