= Strigatella crassicostata =

Scientific classification
- Kingdom: Animalia
- Phylum: Mollusca
- Class: Gastropoda
- Subclass: Caenogastropoda
- Order: Neogastropoda
- Family: Mitridae
- Subfamily: Strigatellinae
- Genus: Strigatella
- Species: S. crassicostata

Binomial name
- Strigatella crassicostata (G. B. Sowerby II, 1874)

Synonyms
- Mitra (Nebularia) aurantia crassicostata G. B. Sowerby II, 1874; Mitra crassicostata G. B. Sowerby II, 1874

Species of gastropod

Strigatella crassicostata is a species of sea snail, a marine gastropod mollusk, in the family Mitridae, the miters or miter snails.

== Description ==
This shell resembles Strigatella vexillum (Reeve, 1844) in form, but with few, thick, rounded ribs, deeply punctured grooves and strongly crenulated outer lip.
