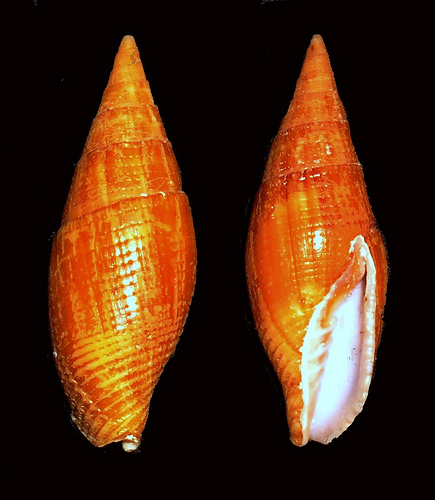

Scientific classification
- Kingdom: Animalia
- Phylum: Mollusca
- Class: Gastropoda
- Subclass: Caenogastropoda
- Order: Neogastropoda
- Family: Mitridae
- Genus: Strigatella
- Species: S. fulvescens

Binomial name
- Strigatella fulvescens (Broderip, 1836)

Synonyms
- Mitra (Nebularia) fulvescens Broderip, 1836; Mitra fulvescens Broderip, 1836; Mitra ostergaardi Pilsbry, H.A., 1920; Mitra pararhodia Cate, J.M., 1963; Mitra telum G. B. Sowerby II, 1874; Nebularia fulvescens (Broderip, 1836)

= Strigatella fulvescens =

Species of gastropod

Strigatella fulvescens, the tawny mitre, is a species of sea snail, a marine gastropod mollusk in the family Mitridae, the miters or miter snails.

== Description ==
The shell size varies between 20 mm and 50 mm.

The shell is acuminated, narrow, smooth, yellow-brown, much compressed at the sides. The spire is as long as the aperture. The aperture is narrow. The outer lip is sinuously contracted, obliquely subtruncated and recurved over the siphonal canal.

== Distribution ==
This species occurs in the Indian Ocean off the Mascarene Basin and in the Pacific off Japan and the Tuamotu Islands .
