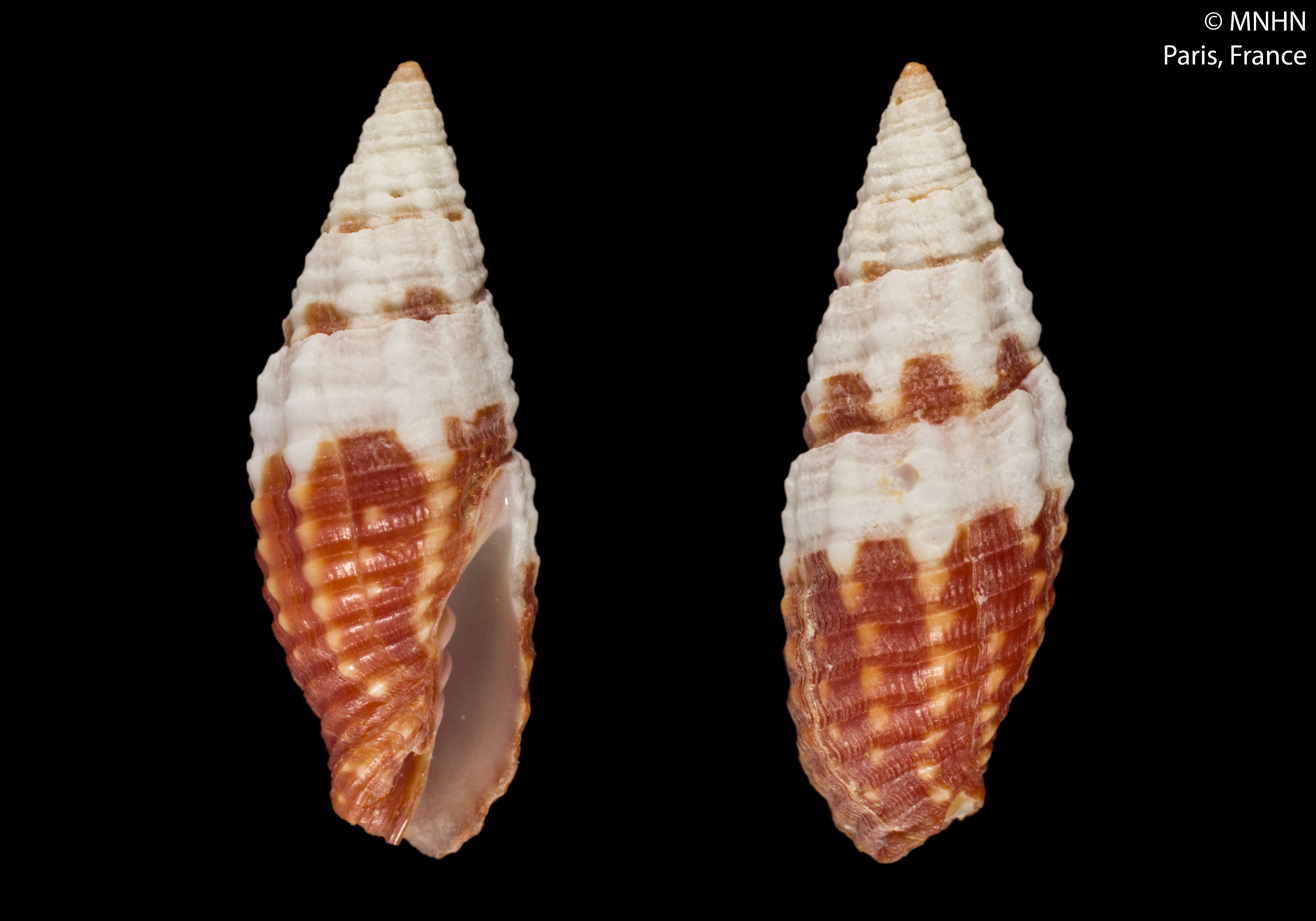
- Shell of Strigatella tabida (holotype at MNHN, Paris)

Scientific classification
- Kingdom: Animalia
- Phylum: Mollusca
- Class: Gastropoda
- Subclass: Caenogastropoda
- Order: Neogastropoda
- Family: Mitridae
- Subfamily: Strigatellinae
- Genus: Strigatella
- Species: S. tabida

Binomial name
- Strigatella tabida (Herrmann & Salisbury, 2013)

Synonyms
- Mitra (Nebularia) tabida Herrmann & Salisbury, 2013; Mitra tabida Herrmann & Salisbury, 2013

= Strigatella tabida =

Species of gastropod

Strigatella tabida is a species of sea snail, a marine gastropod mollusk, in the family Mitridae, the miters or miter snails.

== Description ==
The length of the shell attains 17.6 mm.

== Distribution ==
This marine species occurs off the Tuamotu Archipelago.
