= Strigatella nana =

Scientific classification
- Kingdom: Animalia
- Phylum: Mollusca
- Class: Gastropoda
- Subclass: Caenogastropoda
- Order: Neogastropoda
- Superfamily: Mitroidea
- Family: Mitridae
- Subfamily: Strigatellinae
- Genus: Strigatella
- Species: S. nana

Binomial name
- Strigatella nana (Reeve, 1844)

Synonyms
- Mitra nana Reeve, 1844; Mitra nanus Reeve, 1844

Species of gastropod

Strigatella nana is a species of sea snail, a marine gastropod mollusk, in the family Mitridae, the miters or miter snails.
