= Strigatella pudica =

Scientific classification
- Kingdom: Animalia
- Phylum: Mollusca
- Class: Gastropoda
- Subclass: Caenogastropoda
- Order: Neogastropoda
- Family: Mitridae
- Genus: Strigatella
- Species: S. pudica

Binomial name
- Strigatella pudica (Pease, 1860)

Synonyms
- Mitra (Nebularia) pudica Pease, 1860; Mitra pudica Pease, 1860; Pterygia pudica (Pease, 1860)

Species of gastropod

Strigatella pudica is a species of sea snail, a marine gastropod mollusk in the family Mitridae, the miters or miter snails.

== Distribution ==
This marine species occurs in the Mascarene Basin.
