= Strigatella subruppelli =

Scientific classification
- Kingdom: Animalia
- Phylum: Mollusca
- Class: Gastropoda
- Subclass: Caenogastropoda
- Order: Neogastropoda
- Superfamily: Mitroidea
- Family: Mitridae
- Subfamily: Strigatellinae
- Genus: Strigatella
- Species: S. subruppelli

Binomial name
- Strigatella subruppelli (Finlay, 1927)

Synonyms
- Mitra (Nebularia) aurantia subruppeli Finlay, 1927; Mitra aurantia subruppeli Finlay, 1927; Mitra multisulcata G. B. Sowerby III, 1914 (invalid: junior homonym of Mitra mulltisulcata Harris, 1897; Mitra subruppelli is a replacement name); Mitra subruppeli Finlay, 1927 (incorrect original spelling); Mitra subruppelli Finlay, 1927

Species of mollusc

Strigatella subruppelli is a species of sea snail, a marine gastropod mollusk, in the family Mitridae, the miters or miter snails.

== Description ==
The length of the shell varies between 25 mm and 50 mm.

== Distribution ==
This marine species has a wide distribution and occurs from KwaZulu-Natal, South Africa to the Gulf of Oman and Western India.
