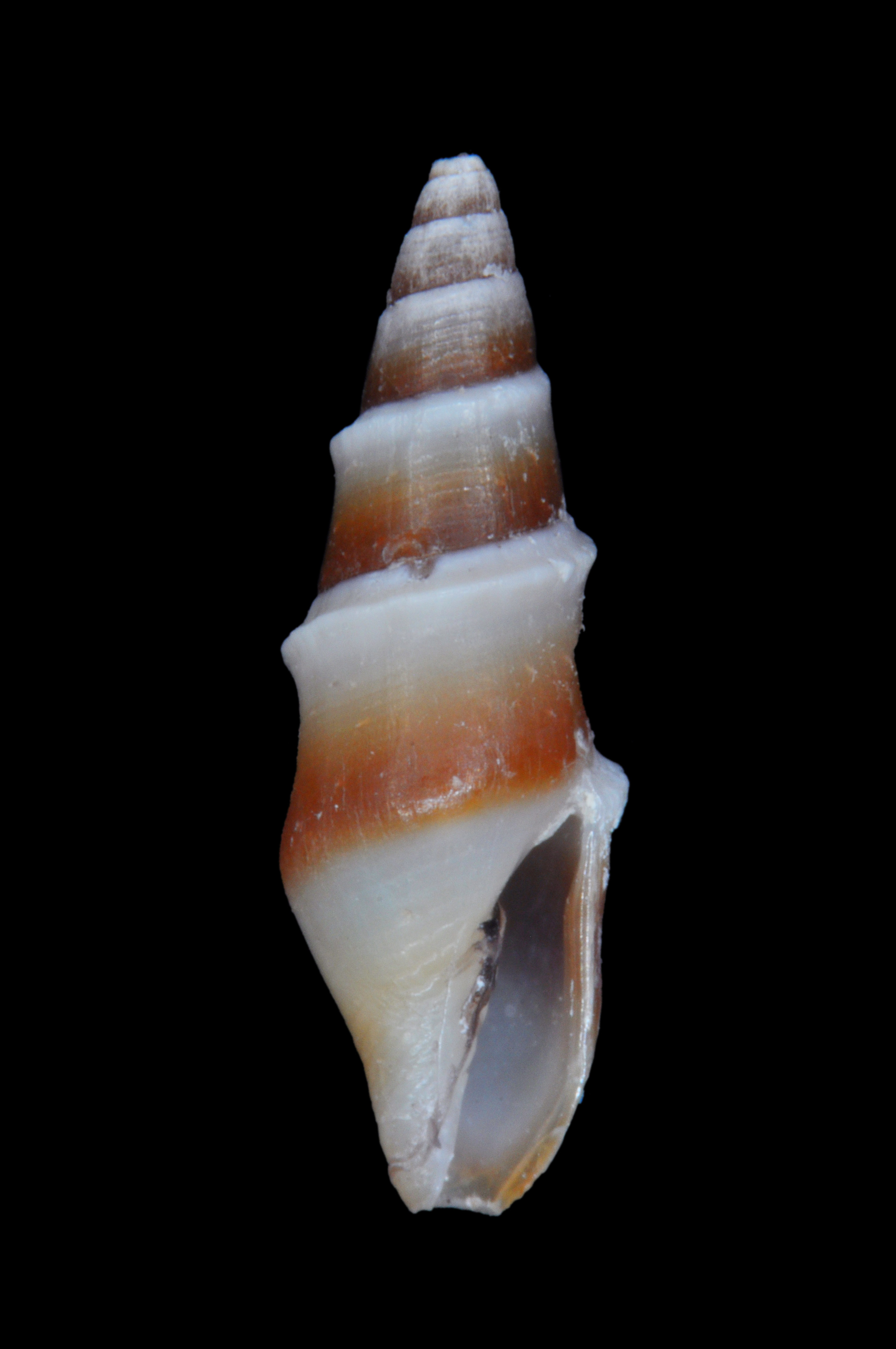
- Shell of Carinomitra peculiaris (specimen at MNHN, Paris)

Scientific classification
- Kingdom: Animalia
- Phylum: Mollusca
- Class: Gastropoda
- Subclass: Caenogastropoda
- Order: Neogastropoda
- Superfamily: Mitroidea
- Family: Mitridae
- Genus: Carinomitra; Fedosov, Herrmann, Kantor & Bouchet, 2018

Type species
- Mitra peculiaris Reeve, 1845

Species
- See text

= Carinomitra =

Genus of gastropods

Carinomitra is a genus of sea snails, marine gastropod mollusks in the family Mitridae.

== Species ==
Species within the genus Carinomitra include:

- Carinomitra peculiaris (Reeve, 1845)
- Carinomitra saltata (Pease, 1865)
- Carinomitra typha (Reeve, 1845)
