= Strigatella zebra =

Scientific classification
- Kingdom: Animalia
- Phylum: Mollusca
- Class: Gastropoda
- Subclass: Caenogastropoda
- Order: Neogastropoda
- Superfamily: Mitroidea
- Family: Mitridae
- Subfamily: Strigatellinae
- Genus: Strigatella
- Species: S. zebra

Binomial name
- Strigatella zebra (Lamarck, 1811)

Synonyms
- Mitra zebra Lamarck, 1811

Species of gastropod

Strigatella zebra is a species of sea snail, a marine gastropod mollusk, in the family Mitridae, the miters or miter snails.
