= Strigatella holkosa =

Scientific classification
- Kingdom: Animalia
- Phylum: Mollusca
- Class: Gastropoda
- Subclass: Caenogastropoda
- Order: Neogastropoda
- Family: Mitridae
- Genus: Strigatella
- Species: S. holkosa

Binomial name
- Strigatella holkosa (B.Q. Li, 2005)

Synonyms
- Mitra holkosa B.Q. Li, 2005

Species of gastropod

Strigatella holkosa is a species of sea snail, a marine gastropod mollusk in the family Mitridae, the miters or miter snails.
