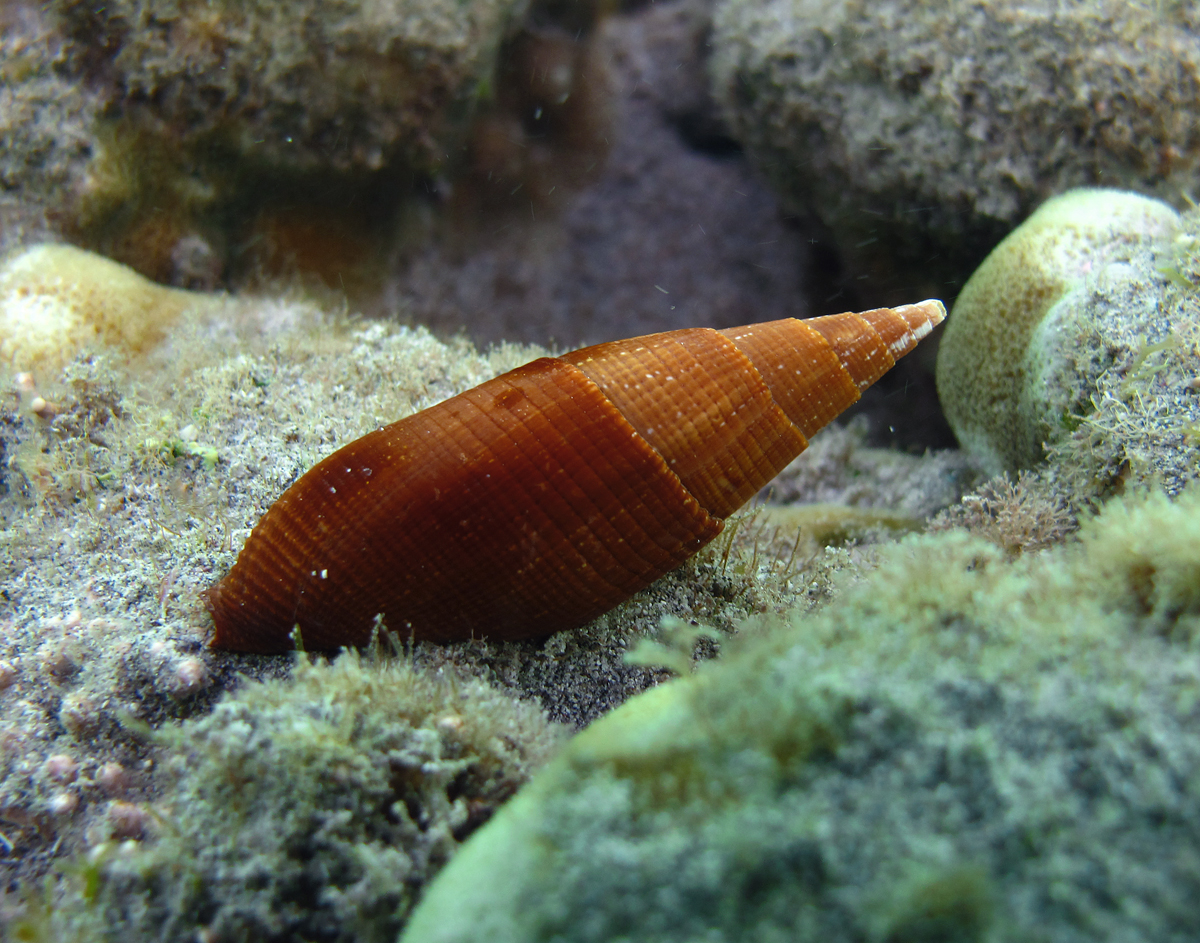
- Strigatella coffea

Scientific classification
- Kingdom: Animalia
- Phylum: Mollusca
- Class: Gastropoda
- Subclass: Caenogastropoda
- Order: Neogastropoda
- Family: Mitridae
- Genus: Strigatella
- Species: S. coffea

Binomial name
- Strigatella coffea (Schubert & Wagner, 1829)

Synonyms
- Mitra coffea Schubert & Wagner, 1829; Mitra fulva Swainson, 1829

= Strigatella coffea =

Species of gastropod

Strigatella coffea (common name: coffee mitre) is a species of sea snail, a marine gastropod mollusk in the family Mitridae, the miters or miter snails.

== Description ==
The shell size varies between 32 mm and 60 mm, with a width of 15 to 21.5 mm. The whorls are less numerous than other members of its genus. The shell is broader and less fusiform. the last whorl is distinctly ventricose and convex and the concave constriction is lower in the species. The denticles on the outer lip are less numerous but are more distant and elongated and placed obliquely or at right angles to the axis of the outer lip. The spiral rows of punctures are shallow and the shell has a smooth appearance. The columellar folds number from 5-7 and are close-set, oblique and white in colour. The exterior colour is uniformly dark chocolate-brown and rarely a faint subsutural band be seen. The interior of the aperture is a deep chocolate-brown and the denticles on the outer lip are off-white in colour.

== Distribution ==
This species is distributed in the Indian Ocean along Madagascar, Mauritius and the Mascarene Basin; in the Pacific Ocean along Tahiti and Hawaii. The species is found on coral reefs, under rocks and in coral crevices, from the intertidal zone to a depth of 14 fathoms. In the Hawaiian Islands the species is generally found at depth from 2-3 fathoms.
