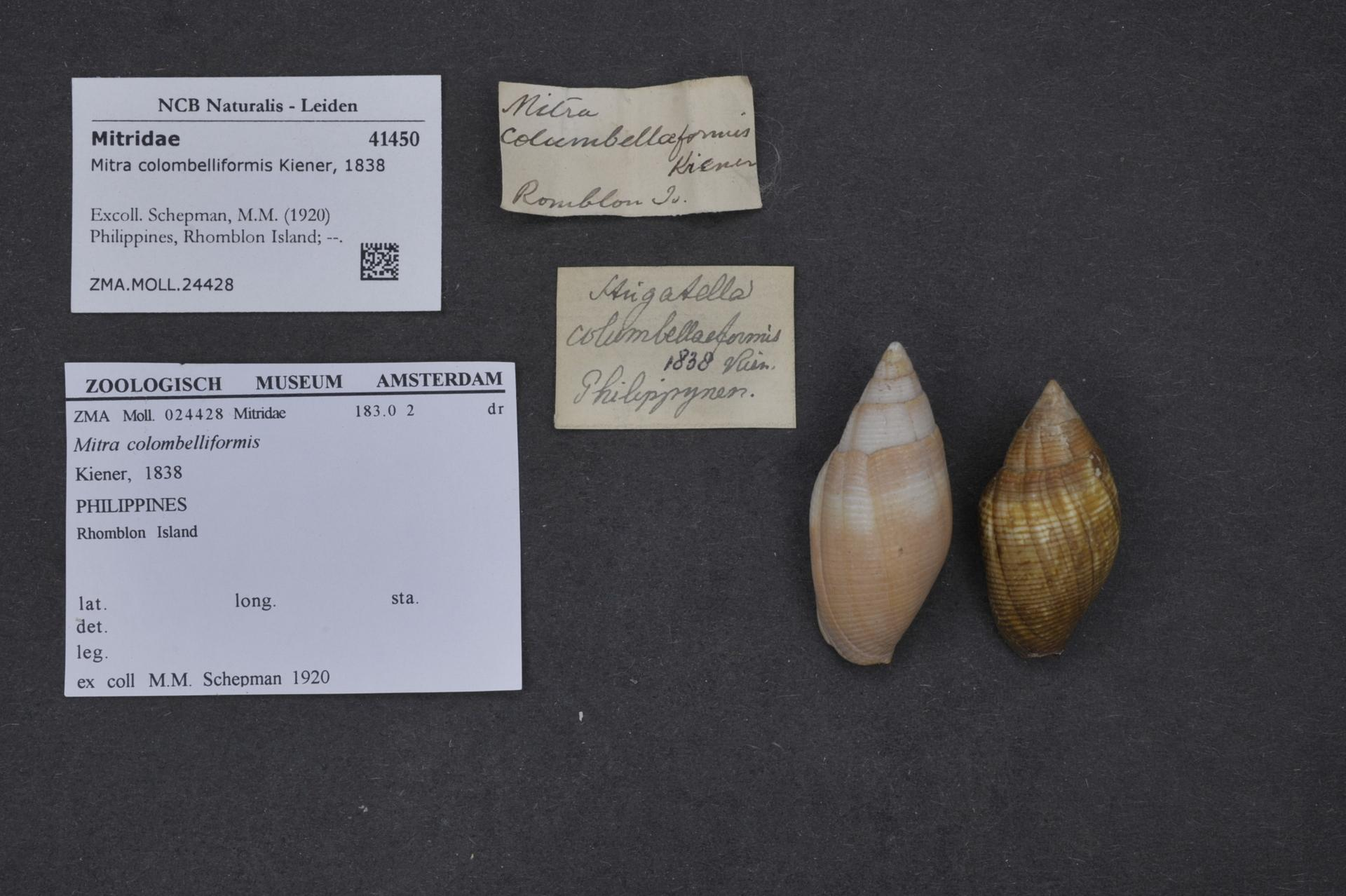

Scientific classification
- Kingdom: Animalia
- Phylum: Mollusca
- Class: Gastropoda
- Subclass: Caenogastropoda
- Order: Neogastropoda
- Family: Mitridae
- Genus: Strigatella
- Species: S. colombelliformis

Binomial name
- Strigatella colombelliformis (Kiener, 1838)

Synonyms
- Mitra colombelliformis Kiener, 1838

= Strigatella colombelliformis =

Species of gastropod

Strigatella colombelliformis is a species of sea snail, a marine gastropod mollusk in the family Mitridae, the miters or miter snails.
