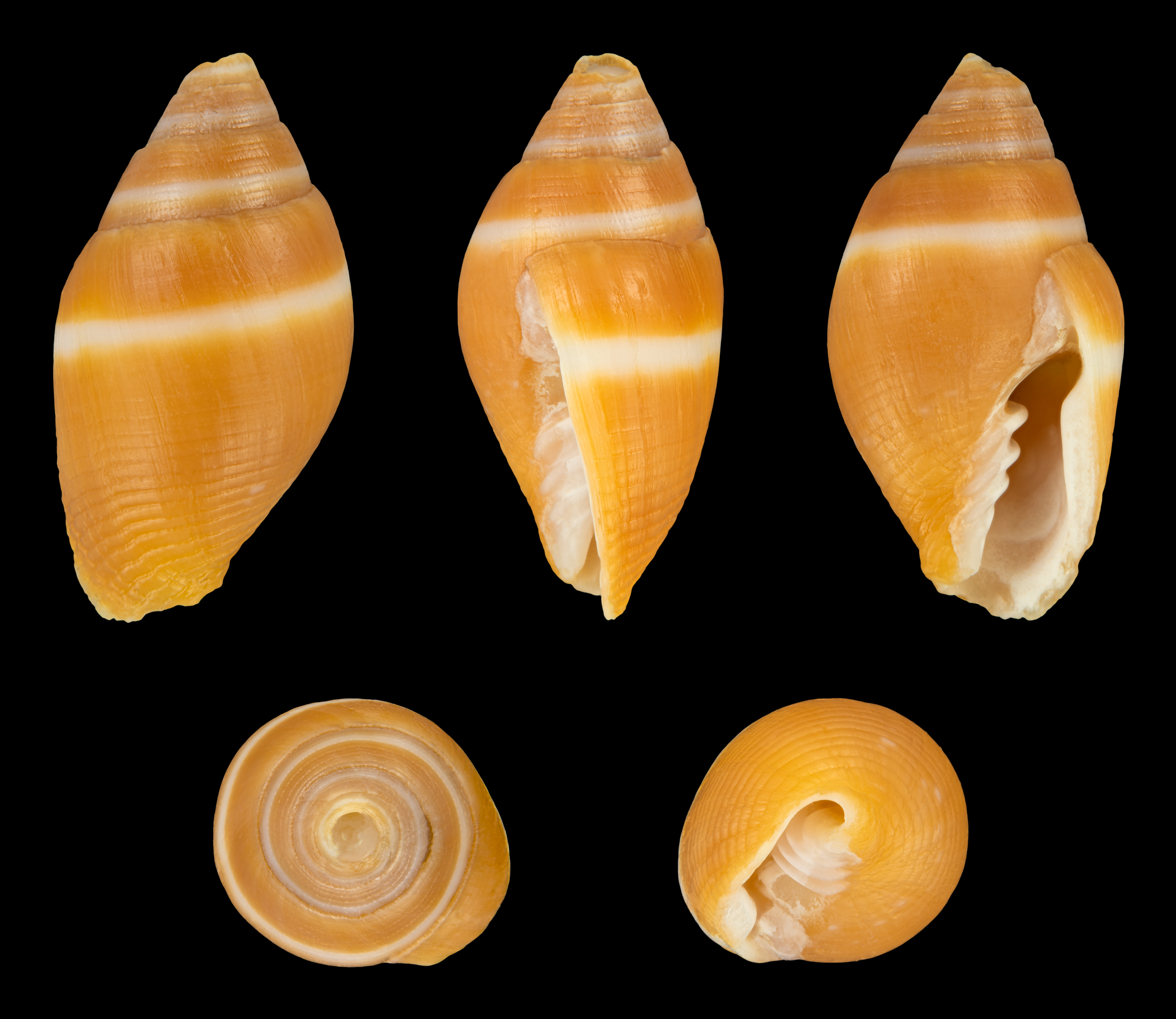

Scientific classification
- Kingdom: Animalia
- Phylum: Mollusca
- Class: Gastropoda
- Subclass: Caenogastropoda
- Order: Neogastropoda
- Family: Mitridae
- Genus: Strigatella
- Species: S. auriculoides

Binomial name
- Strigatella auriculoides (Reeve, 1845)

Synonyms
- Mitra auriculoides Reeve, 1845

= Strigatella auriculoides =

Species of gastropod

Strigatella auriculoides is a species of sea snail, a marine gastropod mollusk in the family Mitridae, the miters or miter snails.
