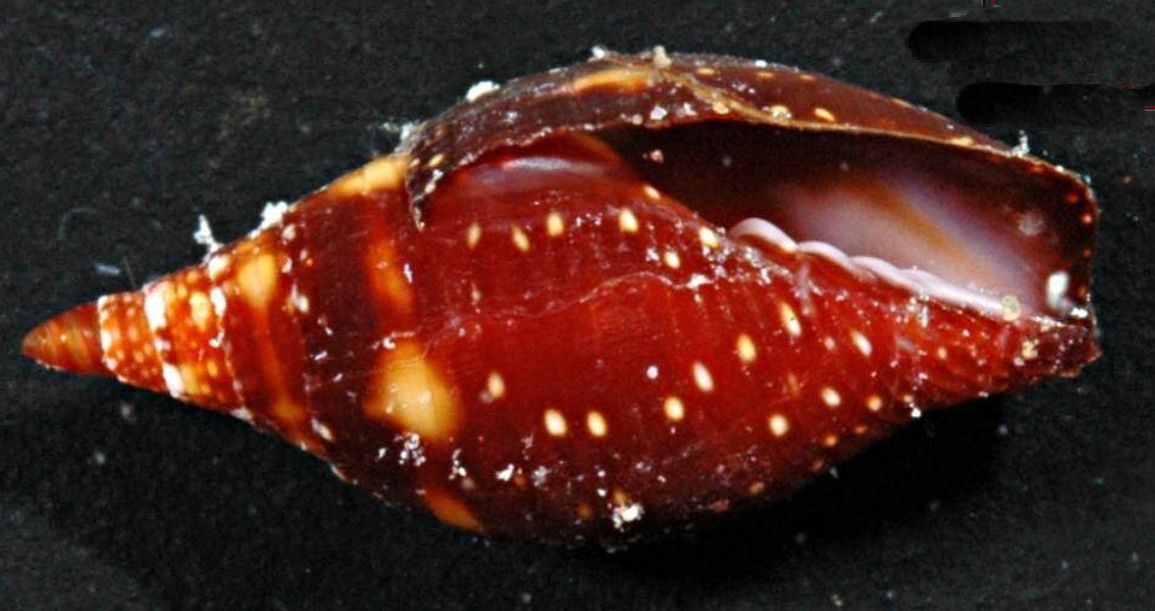
- Shell of Strigatella assimilis (specimen at the Smithsonian Institution)

Scientific classification
- Kingdom: Animalia
- Phylum: Mollusca
- Class: Gastropoda
- Subclass: Caenogastropoda
- Order: Neogastropoda
- Family: Mitridae
- Genus: Strigatella
- Species: S. assimilis

Binomial name
- Strigatella assimilis (Pease, 1868)

Synonyms
- Mitra assimilis Pease, 1868; Mitra (Strigatella) assimilis Pease, 1868; Mitra turturina Souverbie, S.M., 1875

= Strigatella assimilis =

Species of gastropod

Strigatella assimilis is a species of sea snail, a marine gastropod mollusk in the family Mitridae, the miters or miter snails.

The species name Mitra assimilis Garrett, 1873 has been declared a synonym of Vexillum (Pusia) crocatum (Lamarck, 1811)

== Description ==
The shell size varies between 10 mm and 25 mm.

(Original description) The fusiform shell is solid, thick with the base somewhat truncate. It is smooth, encircled with rather distant punctured striae. The spire is short. The outer lip is crenulated on its edge. The columella is four-plaited. The shell is reddish-chestnut, encircled with a single yellowish line or band a short distance below the sutures. The aperture is light purple.

== Distribution ==
This species occurs in the Red Sea and in the Indo-West Pacific.
