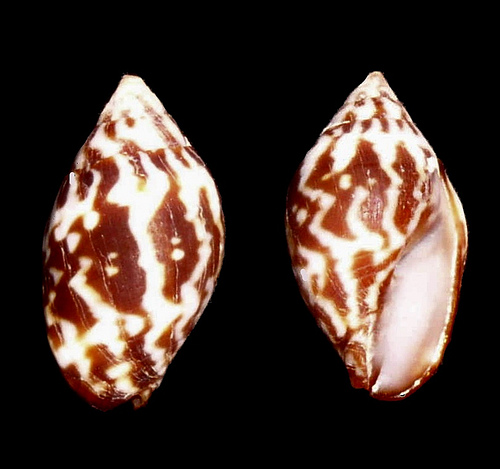

Scientific classification
- Kingdom: Animalia
- Phylum: Mollusca
- Class: Gastropoda
- Subclass: Caenogastropoda
- Order: Neogastropoda
- Family: Mitridae
- Genus: Strigatella
- Species: S. litterata

Binomial name
- Strigatella litterata (Lamarck, 1811)

Synonyms
- Mitra (Strigatella) litterata Lamarck, 1811; Mitra anais Lesson, 1842; Mitra leopardina Küster, 1839 (junior synonym); Mitra litterata Lamarck, 1811 (original combination); Mitra maculosa Reeve, L.A., 1844

= Strigatella litterata =

Species of gastropod

Strigatella litterata is a species of sea snail, a marine gastropod mollusk in the family Mitridae, the miters or miter snails.

== Description ==
The shell size varies between 11 mm and 35 mm

== Distribution ==
This species occurs in the Red Sea and in the Indian Ocean along the Mascarene Basin, Mauritius, Mozambique and Transkei (RSA); in the Western Pacific Ocean along Australia, Papua New Guinea, Okinawa, the Philippines and Indonesia.
