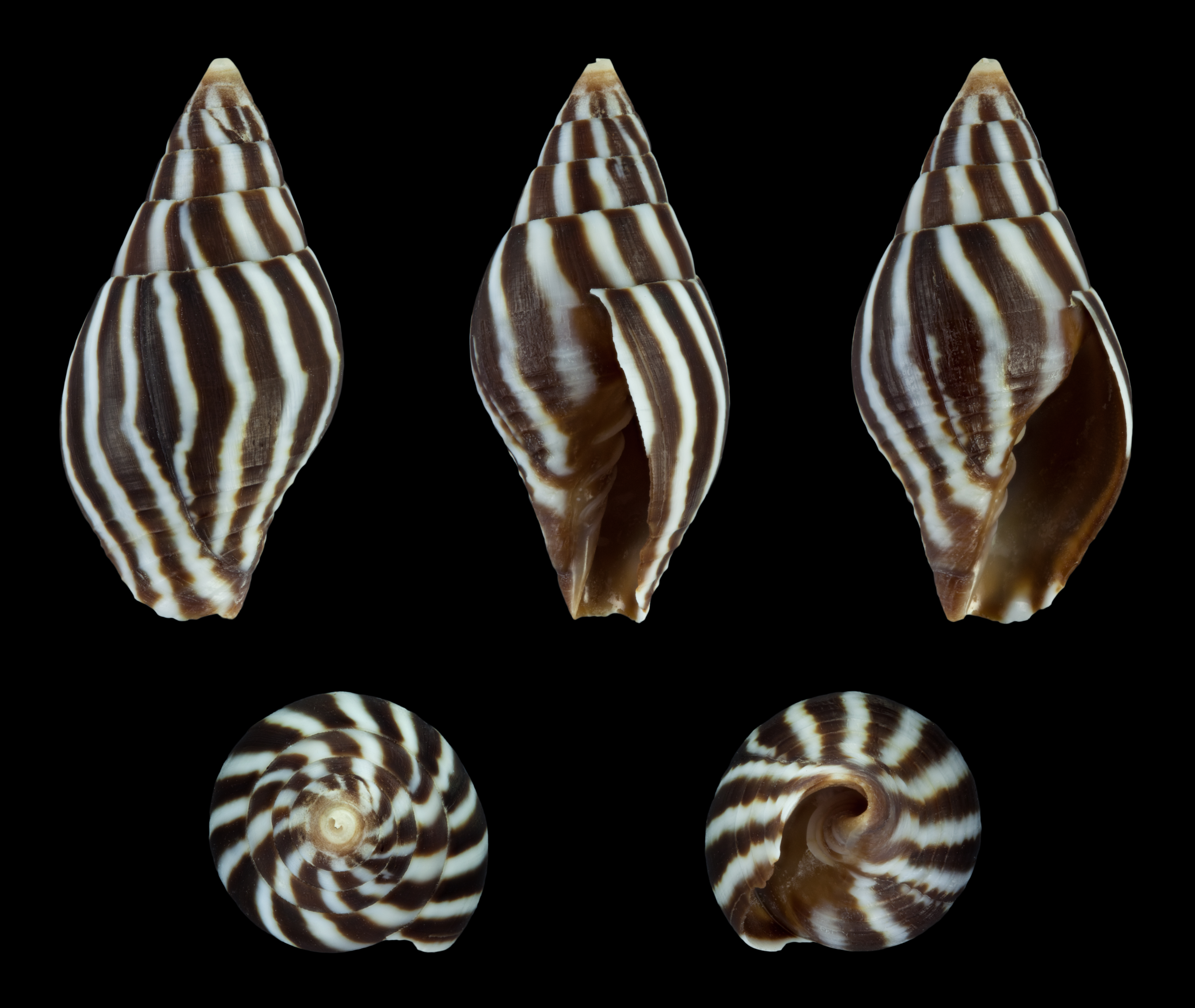

Scientific classification
- Kingdom: Animalia
- Phylum: Mollusca
- Class: Gastropoda
- Subclass: Caenogastropoda
- Order: Neogastropoda
- Family: Mitridae
- Genus: Strigatella
- Species: S. paupercula

Binomial name
- Strigatella paupercula (Linnaeus, 1758)

Synonyms
- Mitra lineata Schumacher, 1817 (junior synonym); Mitra paupercula (Linnaeus, 1758); Mitra radiata Schumacher, 1817; Mitra venosa Röding, 1798; Mitra (Strigatella) paupercula var. obtusata Dautzenberg & Bouge, 1923; Voluta paupercula Linnaeus, 1758

= Strigatella paupercula =

Species of gastropod

Strigatella paupercula is a species of sea snail, a marine gastropod mollusk in the family Mitridae, the miters or miter snails.

== Description ==
The S. paupercula is a relatively small member of the Mitridae with black-and-white or brown-and-white zebra stripes. Common size is 30 mm.

== Distribution ==
This species has a broad Indo-Pacific distribution, including but not limited to East Africa, the Indian Ocean coast of Southern Africa, Japan, the Philippines, and Papua New Guinea.

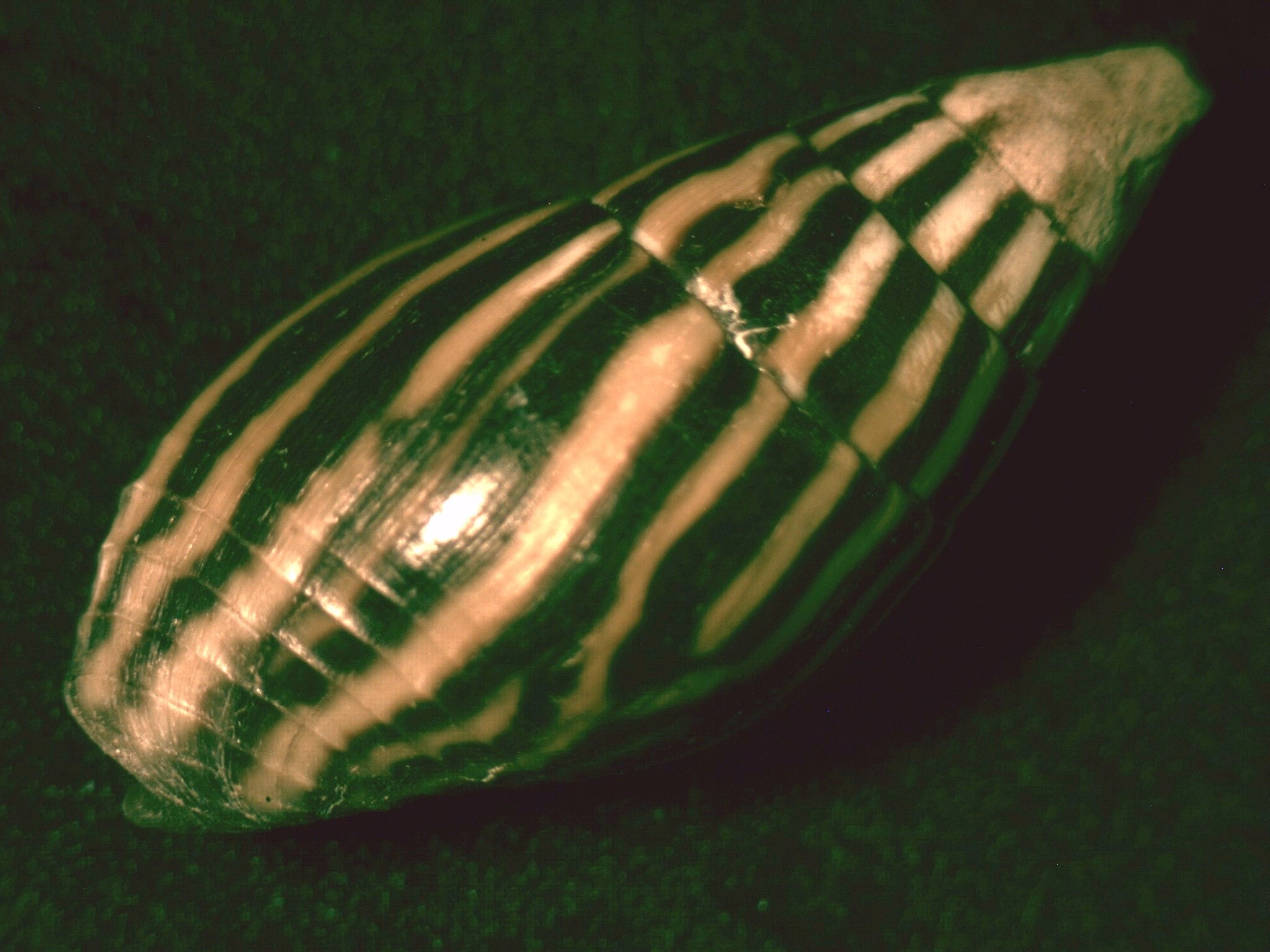
Strigatella paupercula
