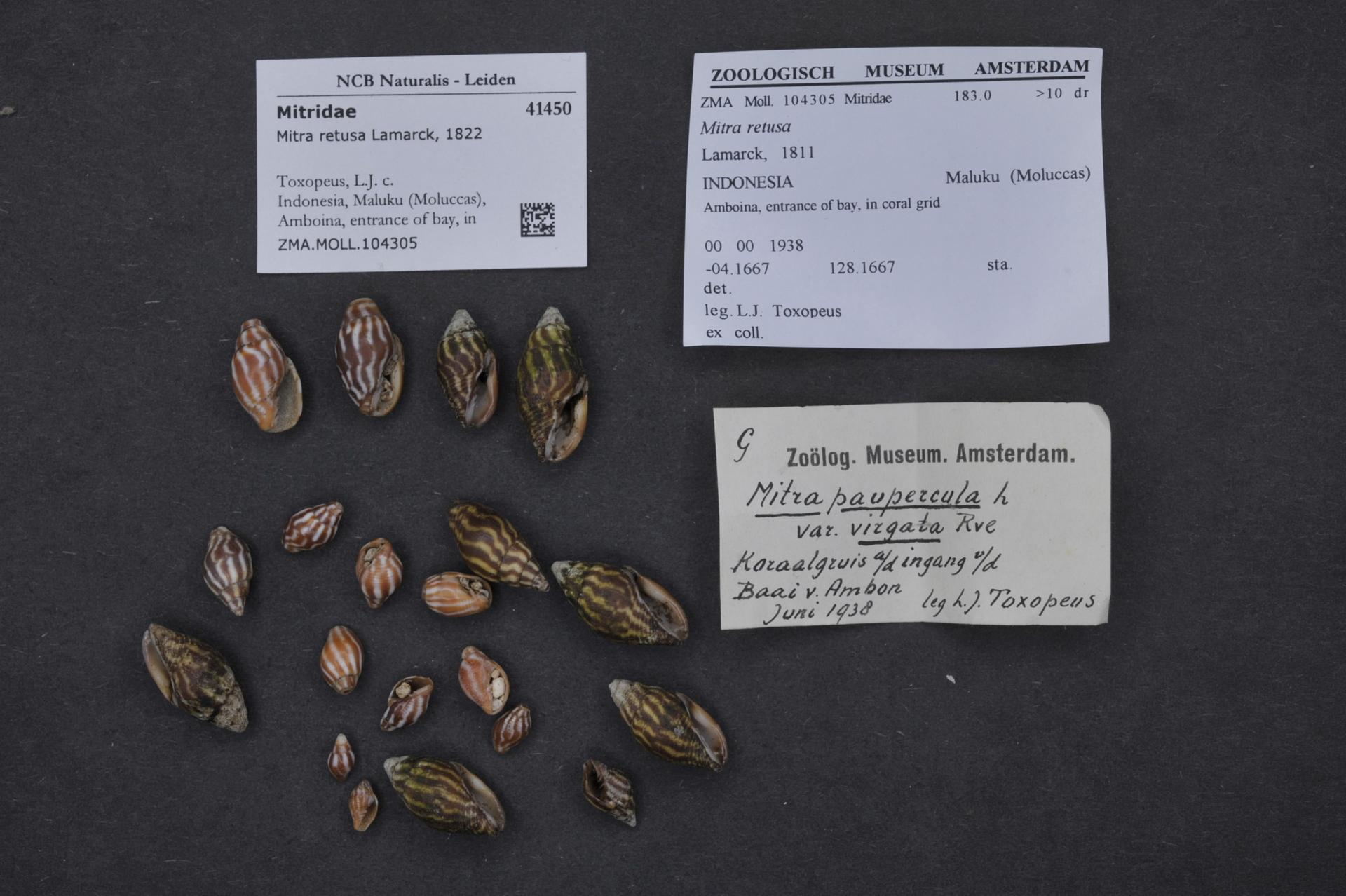
- Preserved specimen

Scientific classification
- Kingdom: Animalia
- Phylum: Mollusca
- Class: Gastropoda
- Subclass: Caenogastropoda
- Order: Neogastropoda
- Family: Mitridae
- Genus: Strigatella
- Species: S. retusa

Binomial name
- Strigatella retusa (Lamarck, 1811)

Synonyms
- Mitra retusa Lamarck, 1811

= Strigatella retusa =

Species of gastropod

Strigatella retusa is a species of sea snail. It is a marine gastropod mollusk in the family Mitridae, the miters or miter snails.
