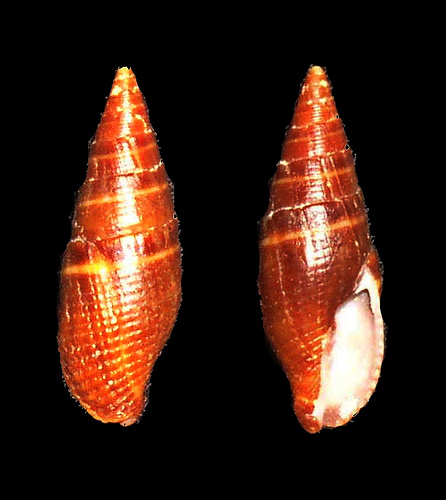

Scientific classification
- Kingdom: Animalia
- Phylum: Mollusca
- Class: Gastropoda
- Subclass: Caenogastropoda
- Order: Neogastropoda
- Family: Mitridae
- Genus: Strigatella
- Species: S. luctuosa

Binomial name
- Strigatella luctuosa (A. Adams, 1813)

Synonyms
- Mitra (Nebularia) luctuosa Adams, A., 1853; Mitra rutila Adams, A., 1853; Mitra nigricans Pease, W.H., 1865; Mitra lamberti Souverbie, S.M., 1875; Mitra astyridiformis Melvill, J.C., 1888; Mitra townsendi Melvill, J.C., 1904; Mitra albocoronata Schepman, M.M., 1911; Mitra alcida Cate, J.M., 1963; Mitra diamantina Cate, J.M., 1963

= Strigatella luctuosa =

Species of gastropod

Strigatella luctuosa is a species of sea snail, a marine gastropod mollusk in the family Mitridae, the miters or miter snails.

== Description ==
The shell size varies between 16 mm and 35 mm.

== Distribution ==
This species is distributed in the Indian Ocean along Aldabra, the Mascarene Basin, Mozambique, Transkei (RFA) and in the Pacific Ocean along the Philippines, Papua New Guinea and Australia.
