= Strigatella abacophora =

Scientific classification
- Kingdom: Animalia
- Phylum: Mollusca
- Class: Gastropoda
- Subclass: Caenogastropoda
- Order: Neogastropoda
- Superfamily: Mitroidea
- Family: Mitridae
- Subfamily: Strigatellinae
- Genus: Strigatella
- Species: S. abacophora

Binomial name
- Strigatella abacophora (Melvill, 1888)

Synonyms
- Mitra (Strigatella) abacophora Melvill, 1888; Mitra (Strigatella) nebrias Melvill, 1895; Mitra abacophora Melvill, 1888

Species of gastropod

Strigatella abacophora is a species of sea snail, a marine gastropod mollusk, in the family Mitridae, the miters or miter snails.
