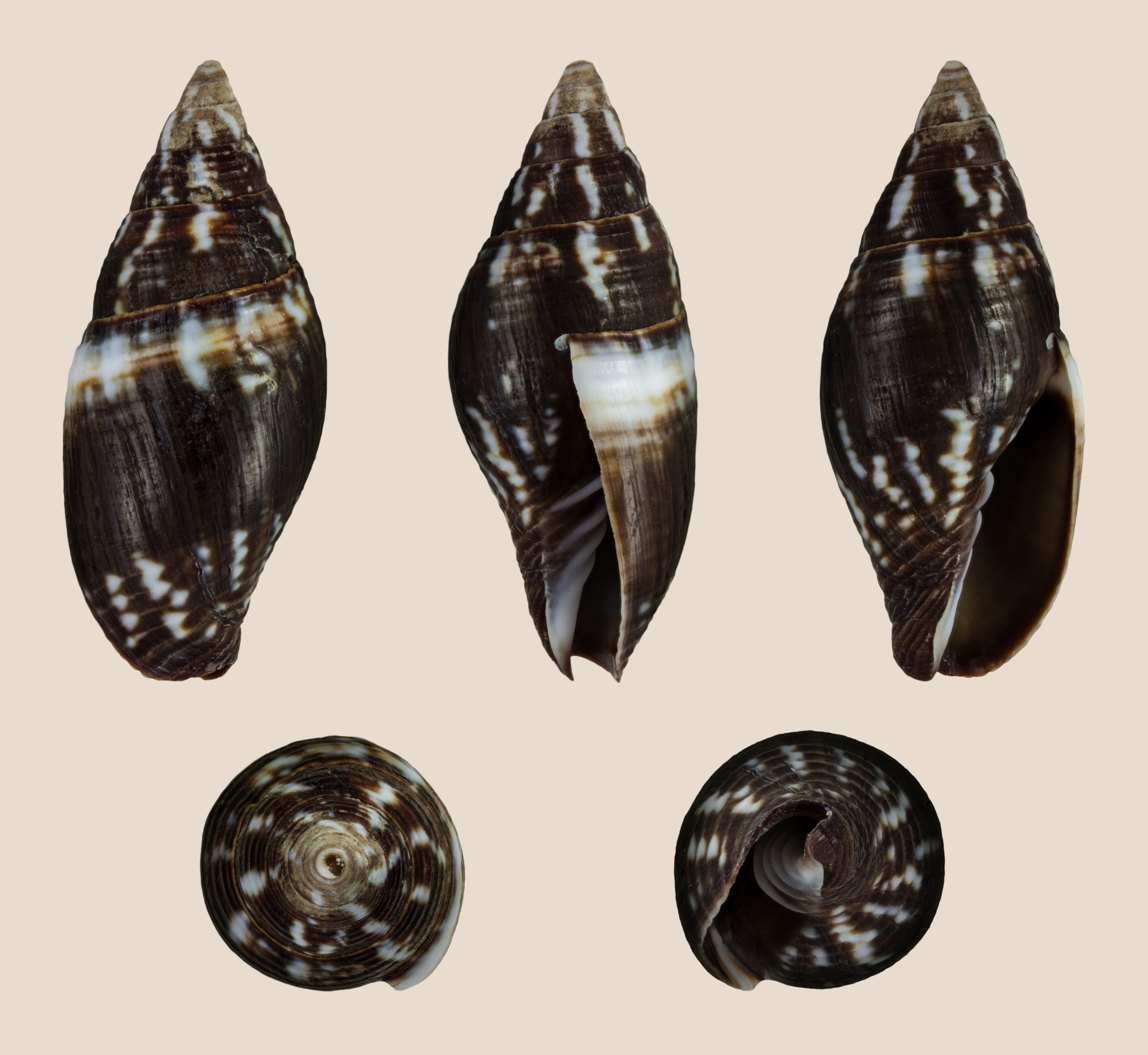

Scientific classification
- Kingdom: Animalia
- Phylum: Mollusca
- Class: Gastropoda
- Subclass: Caenogastropoda
- Order: Neogastropoda
- Family: Mitridae
- Genus: Strigatella
- Species: S. scutulata

Binomial name
- Strigatella scutulata (Gmelin, 1791)

Synonyms
- Mitra scutulata (Gmelin, 1791); Voluta scutulata Gmelin, 1791

= Strigatella scutulata =

Species of gastropod

Strigatella scutulata is a species of sea snail, a marine gastropod mollusk in the family Mitridae, the miters or miter snails.
