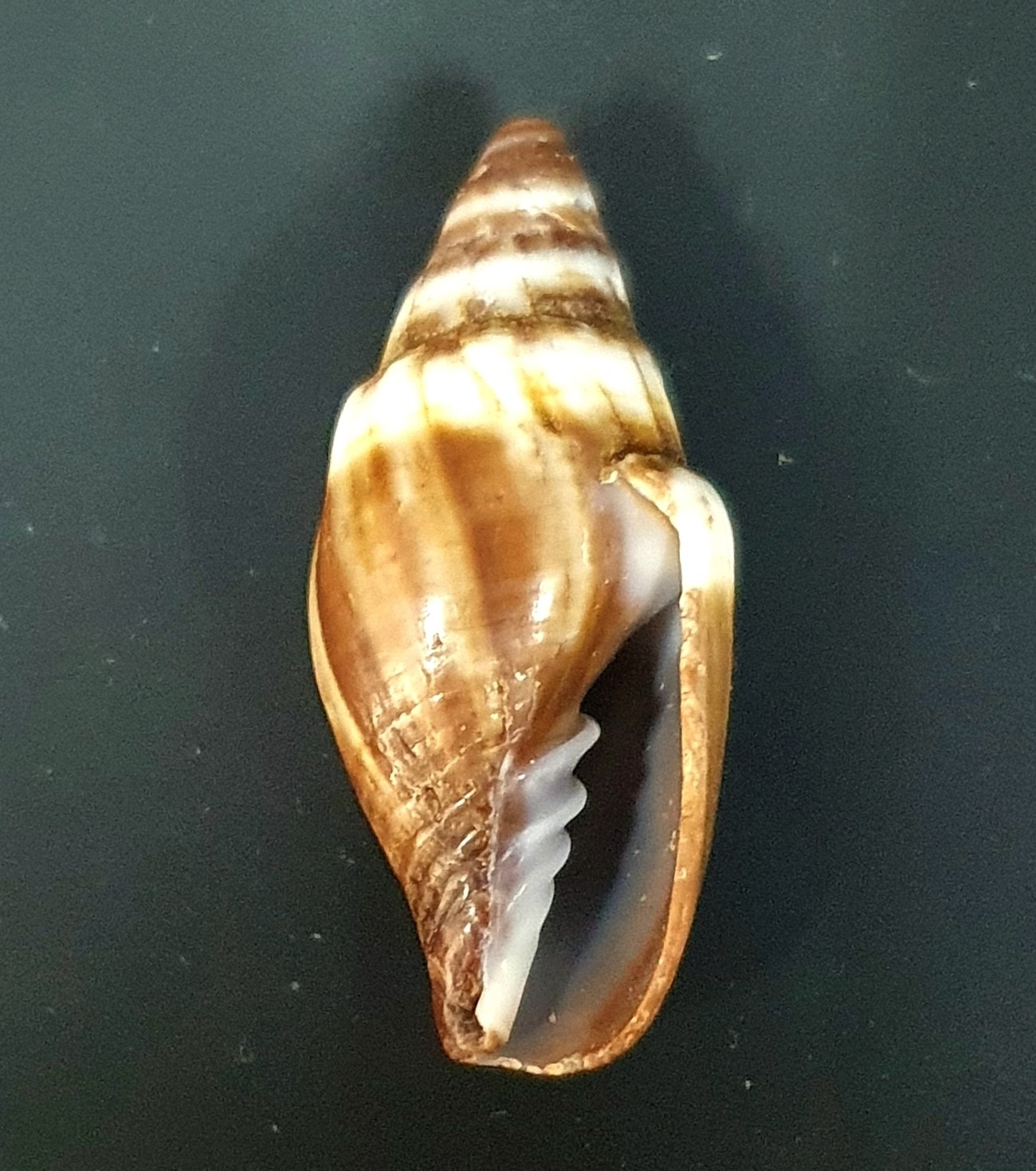

Scientific classification
- Kingdom: Animalia
- Phylum: Mollusca
- Class: Gastropoda
- Subclass: Caenogastropoda
- Order: Neogastropoda
- Family: Mitridae
- Genus: Strigatella
- Species: S. tristis

Binomial name
- Strigatella tristis (Broderip, 1836)

Synonyms
- Mitra (Strigatella) tristis Broderip, 1836; Mitra albofasciata G. B. Sowerby II, 1874 ·; Mitra tristis Broderip, 1836

= Strigatella tristis =

Species of gastropod

Strigatella tristis is a species of sea snail, a marine gastropod mollusk in the family Mitridae, the mitres or mitre snails.

== Description ==
(Described as Mitra albofasciata) This rough South African shell is placed in this section because of its cylindrical form. It is darkly coloured and longitudinally wrinkled, with a white band at the suture of the whorls where they are a little shouldered.

== Distribution ==
This marine species occurs off the Galapagos Islands
