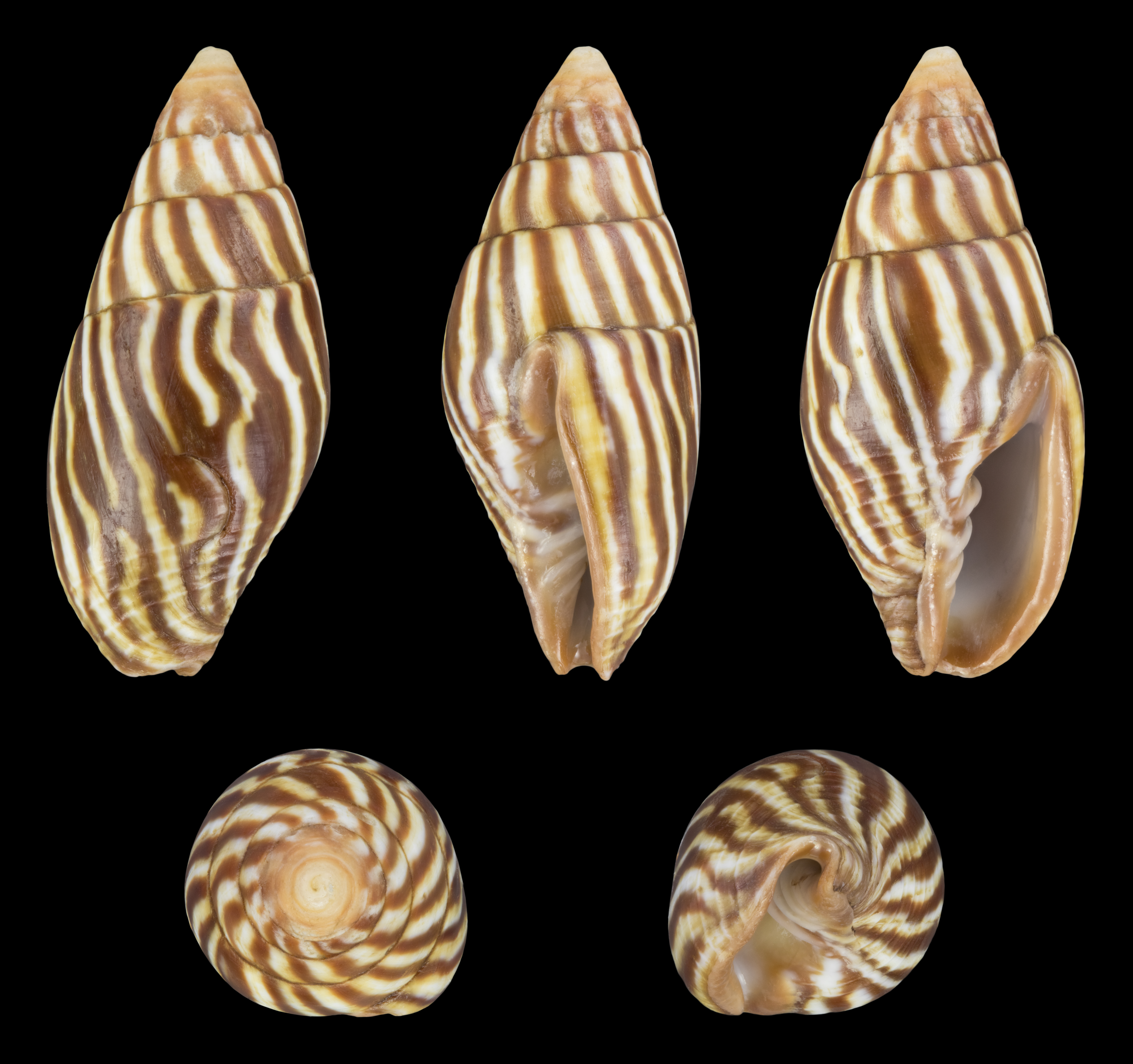

Scientific classification
- Kingdom: Animalia
- Phylum: Mollusca
- Class: Gastropoda
- Subclass: Caenogastropoda
- Order: Neogastropoda
- Family: Mitridae
- Genus: Strigatella
- Species: S. pica

Binomial name
- Strigatella pica (Dillwyn, 1817)

Synonyms
- Mitra pica Dillwyn, 1817; Mitra tigrina A.Adams, 1853

= Strigatella pica =

Species of gastropod

Strigatella pica is a species of sea snail, a marine gastropod mollusk in the family Mitridae, the miters or miter snails.
