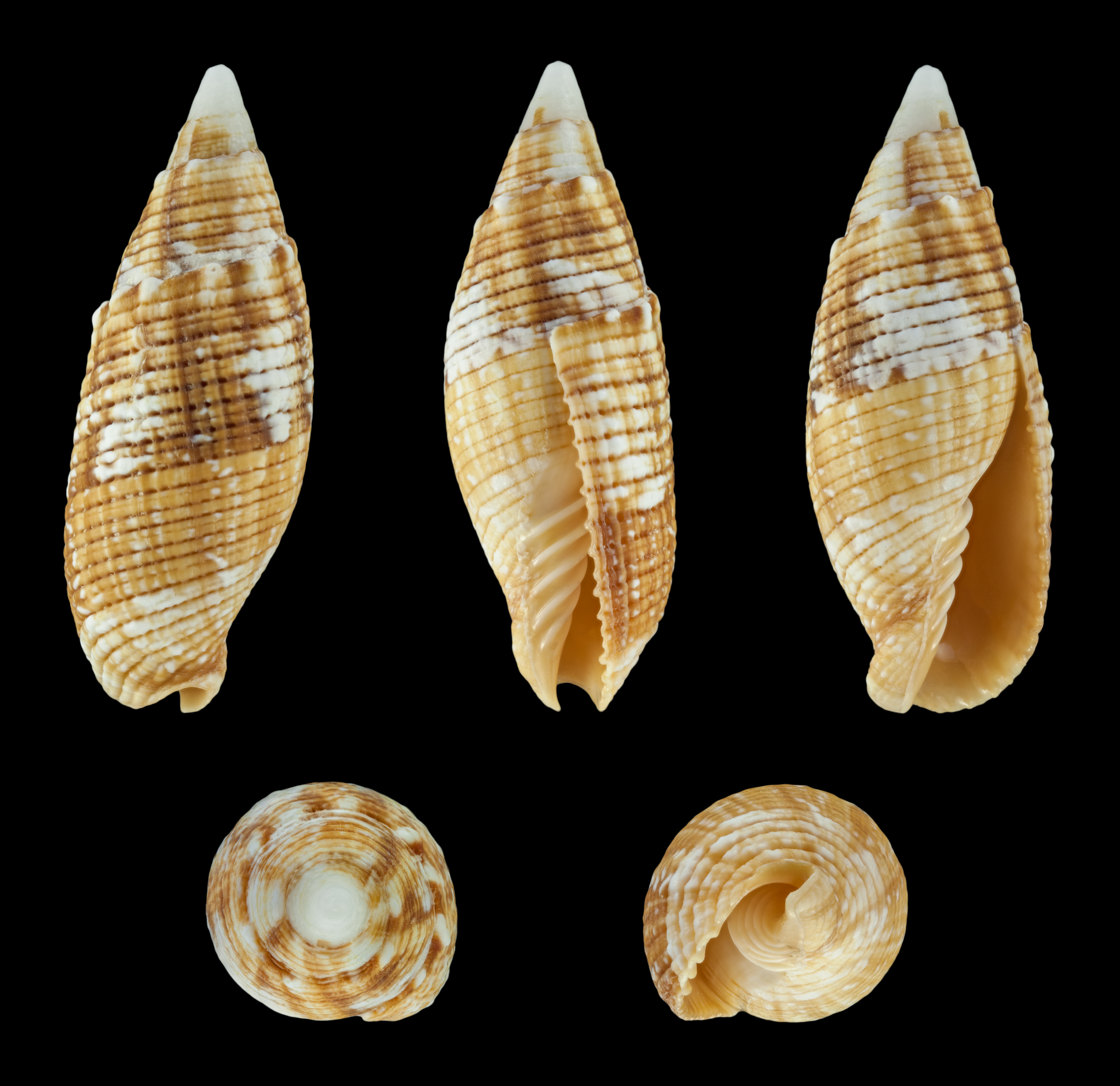

Scientific classification
- Kingdom: Animalia
- Phylum: Mollusca
- Class: Gastropoda
- Subclass: Caenogastropoda
- Order: Neogastropoda
- Family: Mitridae
- Genus: Strigatella
- Species: S. imperialis

Binomial name
- Strigatella imperialis (Röding, 1798)

Synonyms
- Mitra digitalis (Link, 1807); Mitra (Mitra) imperialis Röding, 1798; Voluta digitalis Link, H.F., 1807

= Strigatella imperialis =

Species of gastropod

Strigatella imperialis (common name: imperial mitre) is a species of sea snail, a marine gastropod mollusk in the family Mitridae, the miters or miter snails.

== Description ==
The shell size varies between 37 mm and 65 mm.

== Distribution ==
This species is distributed in the Red Sea, in the Indian Ocean along the Mascarene Basin and Tanzania; in the Pacific Ocean along Fiji and the Solomons. From 1863 to 2013, there have been 65 to 80 instances of this species along these areas, although most of them have been dropped.
