= Strigatella fasciolaris =

Scientific classification
- Kingdom: Animalia
- Phylum: Mollusca
- Class: Gastropoda
- Subclass: Caenogastropoda
- Order: Neogastropoda
- Family: Mitridae
- Genus: Strigatella
- Species: S. fasciolaris

Binomial name
- Strigatella fasciolaris (Deshayes, 1834)

Synonyms
- Mitra (Mitra) fasciolaris Deshayes, 1834; Mitra fasciolaris Deshayes, 1834; Mitra arabica Dohrn, 1861

Species of gastropod

Strigatella fasciolaris is a species of sea snail, a marine gastropod mollusk in the miter snail family. This species occurs in the Red Sea.
