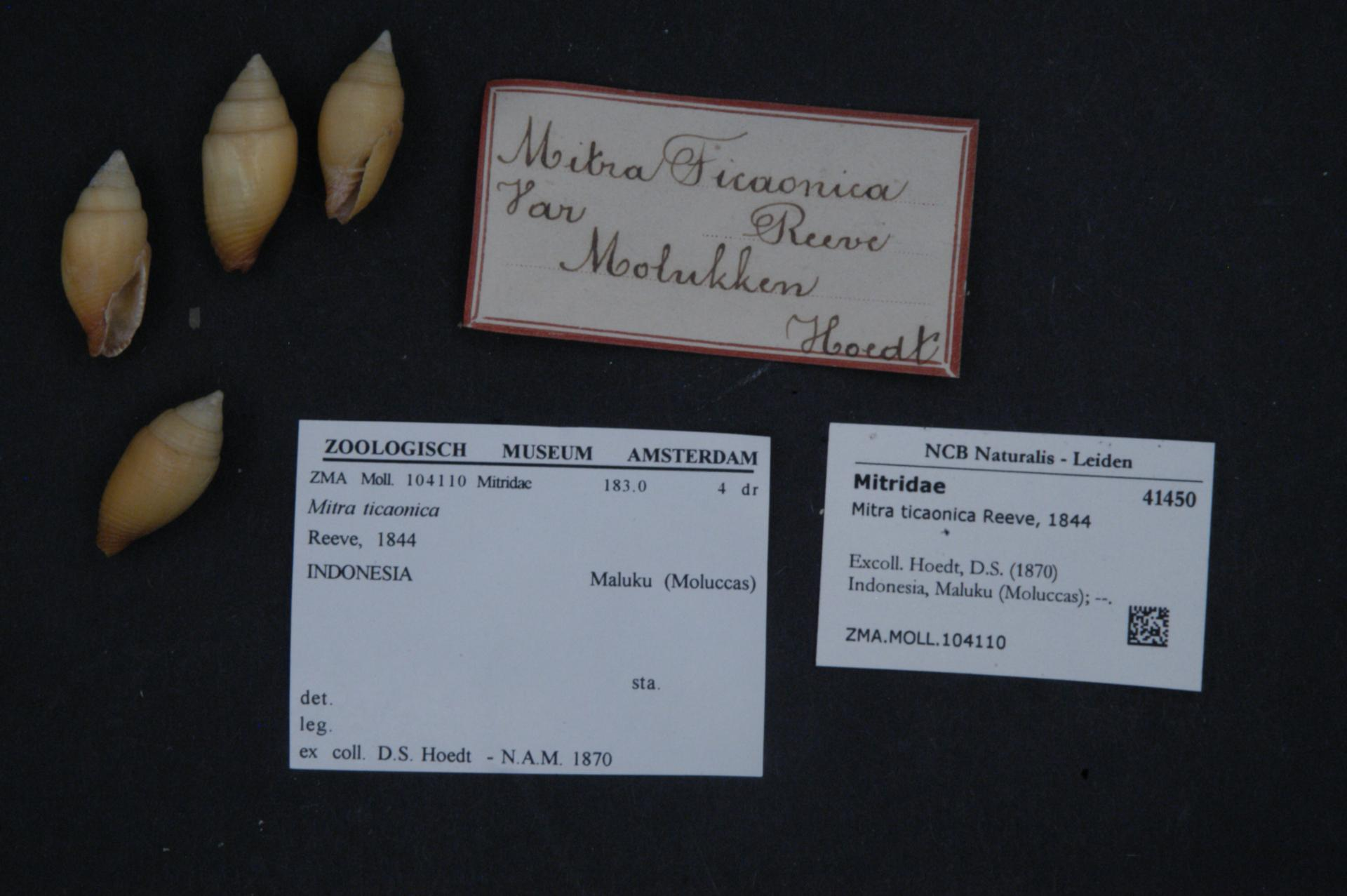
- Strigatella ticaonica syn. Mitra ticanoica (Reeve, 1844) shell specimen from the Natural Biodiversity Center collection

Scientific classification
- Kingdom: Animalia
- Phylum: Mollusca
- Class: Gastropoda
- Subclass: Caenogastropoda
- Order: Neogastropoda
- Family: Mitridae
- Genus: Strigatella
- Species: S. ticaonica

Binomial name
- Strigatella ticaonica (Reeve, 1844)

Synonyms
- Mitra ticaonica Reeve, 1844

= Strigatella ticaonica =

Species of gastropod

Strigatella ticaonica is a species of sea snail, a marine gastropod mollusk in the family Mitridae, the miters or miter snails.
