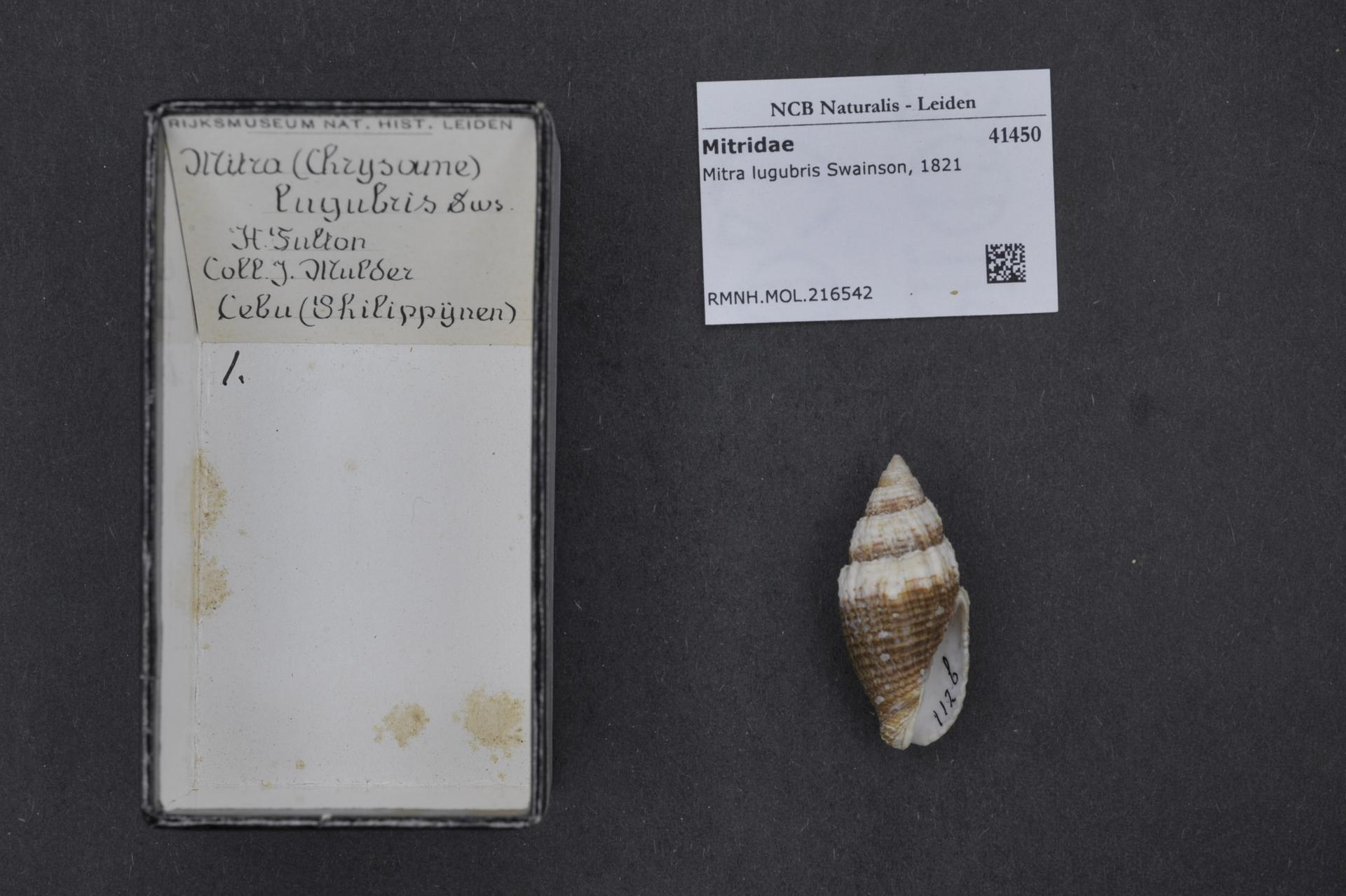

Scientific classification
- Kingdom: Animalia
- Phylum: Mollusca
- Class: Gastropoda
- Subclass: Caenogastropoda
- Order: Neogastropoda
- Family: Mitridae
- Genus: Strigatella
- Species: S. lugubris

Binomial name
- Strigatella lugubris (Swainson, 1821)

Synonyms
- Mitra lugubris Swainson, 1821

= Strigatella lugubris =

Species of gastropod

Strigatella lugubris is a species of sea snail, a marine gastropod mollusk in the miter snail family.
