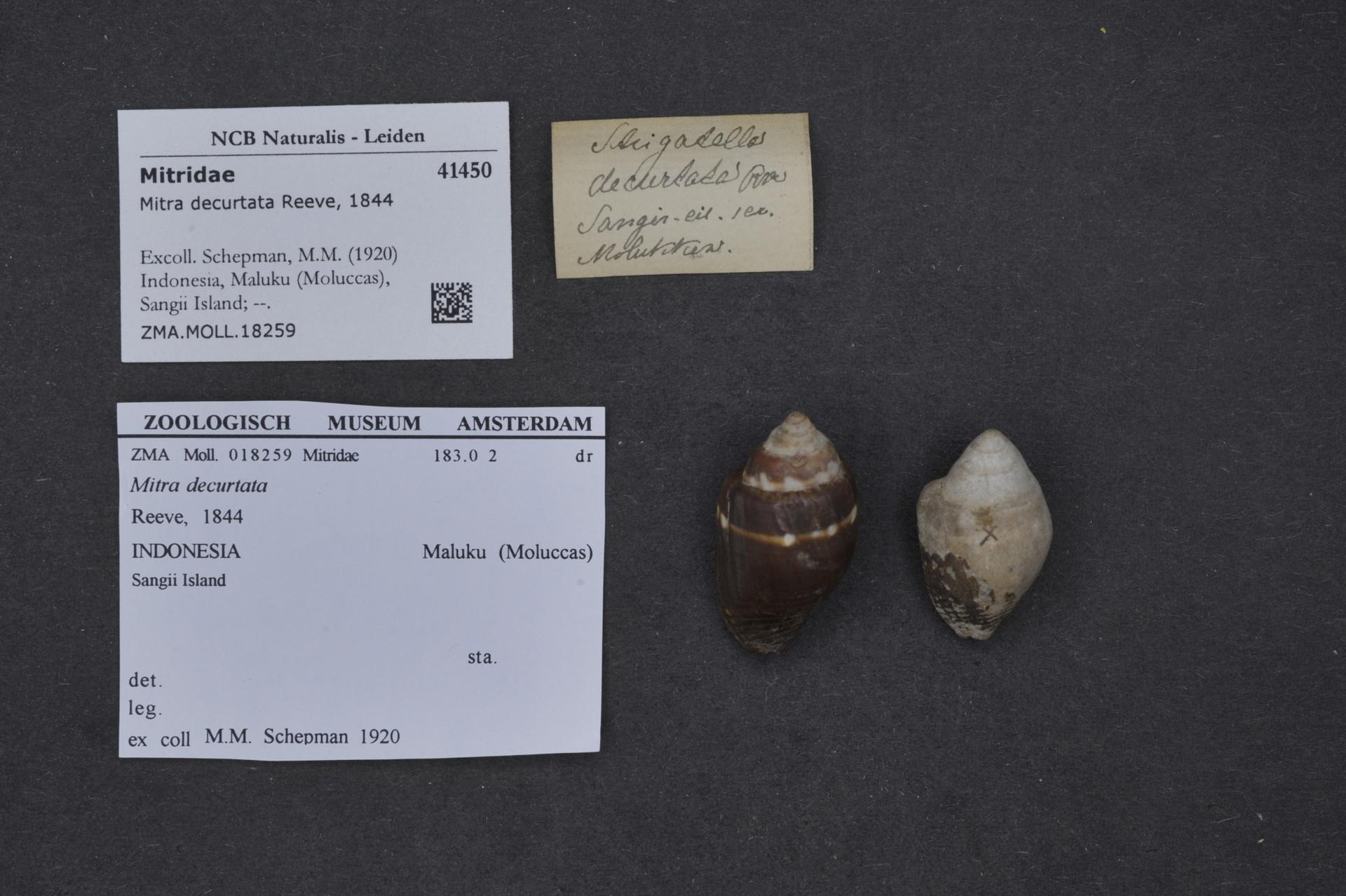
- Preserved specimen - Mitra decurtata Reeve, 1844

Scientific classification
- Kingdom: Animalia
- Phylum: Mollusca
- Class: Gastropoda
- Subclass: Caenogastropoda
- Order: Neogastropoda
- Family: Mitridae
- Genus: Strigatella
- Species: S. decurtata

Binomial name
- Strigatella decurtata (Reeve, 1844)

Synonyms
- Mitra decurtata Reeve, 1844

= Strigatella decurtata =

Species of gastropod

Strigatella decurtata is a species of sea snail, a marine gastropod mollusk in the family Mitridae, the miters or miter snails.
