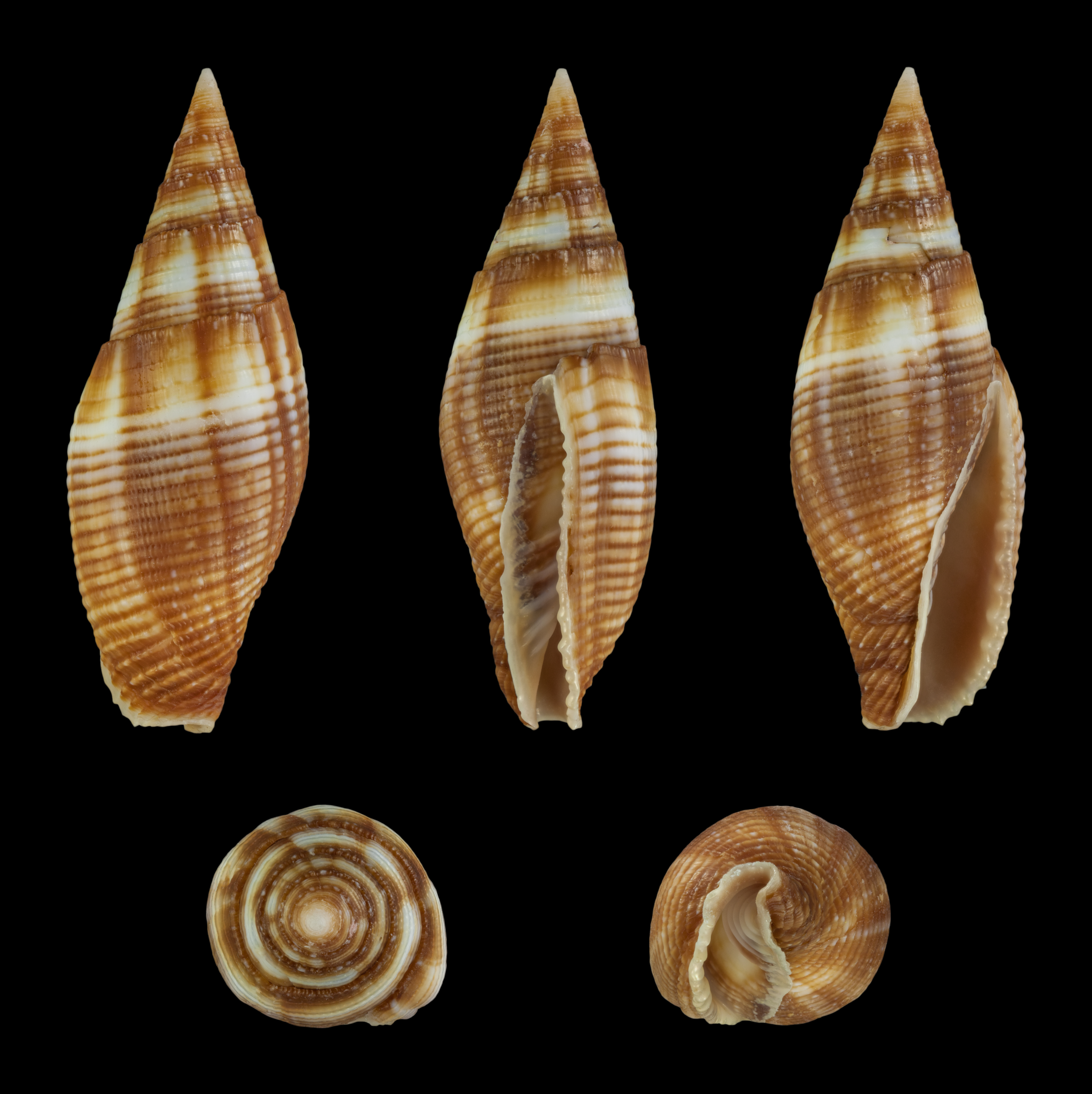

Scientific classification
- Kingdom: Animalia
- Phylum: Mollusca
- Class: Gastropoda
- Subclass: Caenogastropoda
- Order: Neogastropoda
- Superfamily: Mitroidea
- Family: Mitridae
- Subfamily: Strigatellinae
- Genus: Strigatella
- Species: S. ambigua

Binomial name
- Strigatella ambigua (Swainson, 1829)

Synonyms
- Chrysame ambigua (Swainson, 1829); Mitra (Mitra) ambigua Swainson, 1829; Mitra ambigua Swainson, 1829; Nebularia ambigua (Swainson, 1829)

= Strigatella ambigua =

Species of gastropod

Strigatella ambigua is a species of sea snail, a marine gastropod mollusk, in the family Mitridae, the miters or miter snails.
