= Strigatella flavocingulata =

Scientific classification
- Kingdom: Animalia
- Phylum: Mollusca
- Class: Gastropoda
- Subclass: Caenogastropoda
- Order: Neogastropoda
- Family: Mitridae
- Genus: Strigatella
- Species: S. flavocingulata

Binomial name
- Strigatella flavocingulata (Lamy, 1938)

Synonyms
- Mitra flavocingulata Lamy, 1938

Species of gastropod

Strigatella flavocingulata is a species of sea snail, a marine gastropod mollusk in the miter snail family.

== Distribution ==
Pacific Ocean: Easter Island.

Chile, Valparaiso, Isla de Pascua.

== Habitat ==
Sandy areas among seagrass, in tide pools.
