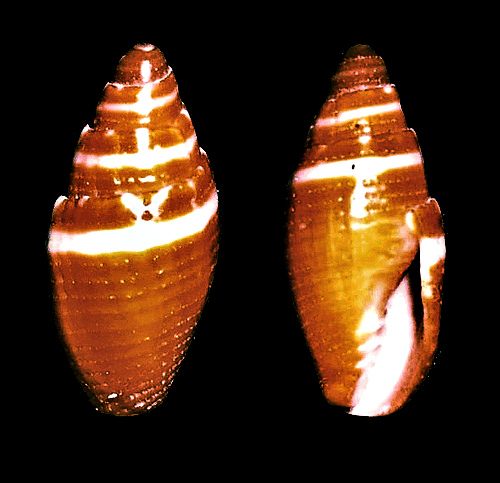

Scientific classification
- Kingdom: Animalia
- Phylum: Mollusca
- Class: Gastropoda
- Subclass: Caenogastropoda
- Order: Neogastropoda
- Family: Mitridae
- Genus: Strigatella
- Species: S. coronata

Binomial name
- Strigatella coronata (Lamarck, 1811)

Synonyms
- Mitra coronata Lamarck, 1811; Mitra (Nebularia) coronata Lamarck, 1811

= Strigatella coronata =

Species of gastropod

Strigatella coronata is a species of sea snail, a marine gastropod mollusk in the family Mitridae, the miters or miter snails.
