= Strigatella aurora =

Scientific classification
- Kingdom: Animalia
- Phylum: Mollusca
- Class: Gastropoda
- Subclass: Caenogastropoda
- Order: Neogastropoda
- Family: Mitridae
- Genus: Strigatella
- Species: S. aurora

Binomial name
- Strigatella aurora (Dohrn, 1861)

Synonyms
- Mitra aurora Dohrn, 1861

Species of gastropod

Strigatella aurora is a species of sea snail, a marine gastropod mollusk in the family Mitridae, the miters or miter snails.

== Description ==
This species attains a size of 50 mm. Its shell is red or brown in color, with large irregular white blotches. The animal itself is a red-brown with white edges.

== Distribution ==
Strigatella aurora is found from the Red Sea to the Marshall Islands and Hawaii, typically in shallow water.
