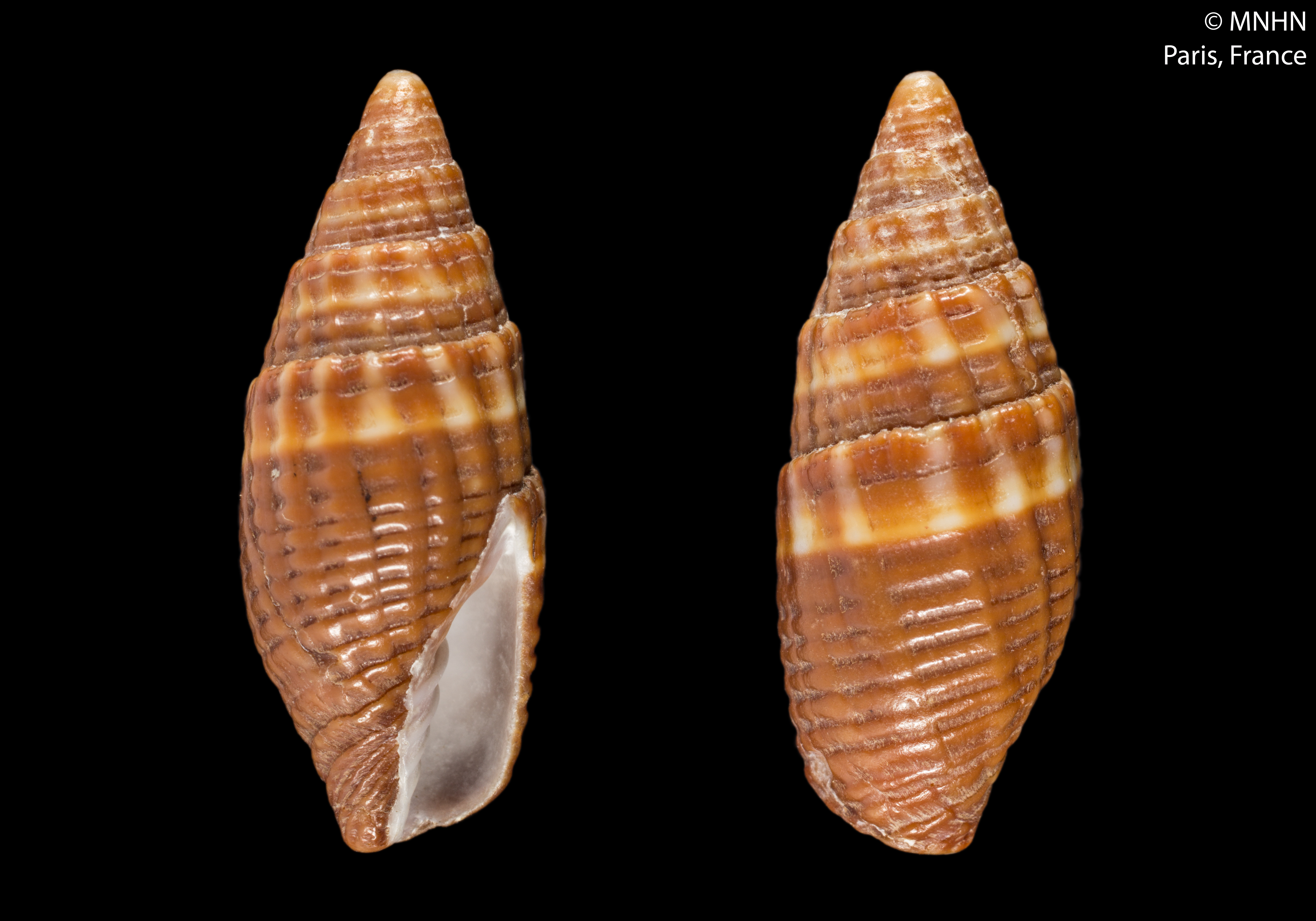
- Shell of Strigatella amaura (lectotype at MNHN, Paris)

Scientific classification
- Kingdom: Animalia
- Phylum: Mollusca
- Class: Gastropoda
- Subclass: Caenogastropoda
- Order: Neogastropoda
- Family: Mitridae
- Subfamily: Strigatellinae
- Genus: Strigatella
- Species: S. amaura

Binomial name
- Strigatella amaura (Hervier, 1897)

Synonyms
- Mitra (Nebularia) amaura Hervier, 1897; Mitra amaura Hervier, 1897

= Strigatella amaura =

Species of gastropod

Strigatella amaura is a species of sea snail in the miter snail family, Mitridae.

== Description ==
The length of the shell attains 22.2 mm.

== Distribution ==
This marine species occurs off New Caledonia and the Loyalty Islands.
