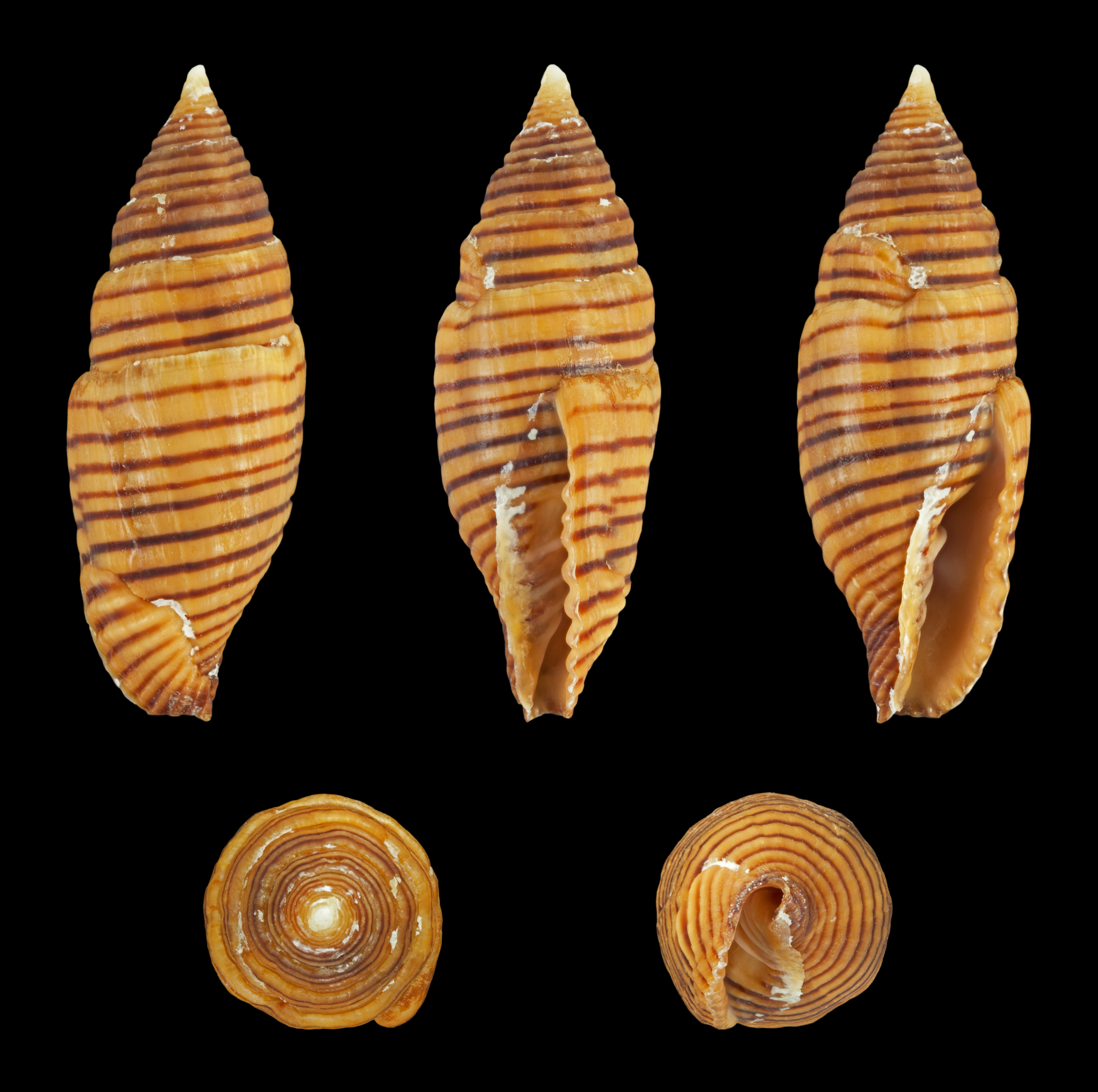

Scientific classification
- Kingdom: Animalia
- Phylum: Mollusca
- Class: Gastropoda
- Subclass: Caenogastropoda
- Order: Neogastropoda
- Family: Mitridae
- Genus: Strigatella
- Species: S. vexillum

Binomial name
- Strigatella vexillum (Reeve, 1844)

Synonyms
- Mitra (Nebularia) vexillum Reeve, 1844; Mitra vexillum Reeve, 1844

= Strigatella vexillum =

Species of gastropod

Strigatella vexillum, common name : the vexillate mitre, is a species of sea snail, a marine gastropod mollusk in the family Mitridae, the miters or miter snails.

== Description ==
The shell size varies between 25 mm and 86.5 mm.

== Distribution ==
This species is distributed in the Indian Ocean along East Africa and in the Central Pacific Ocean.
