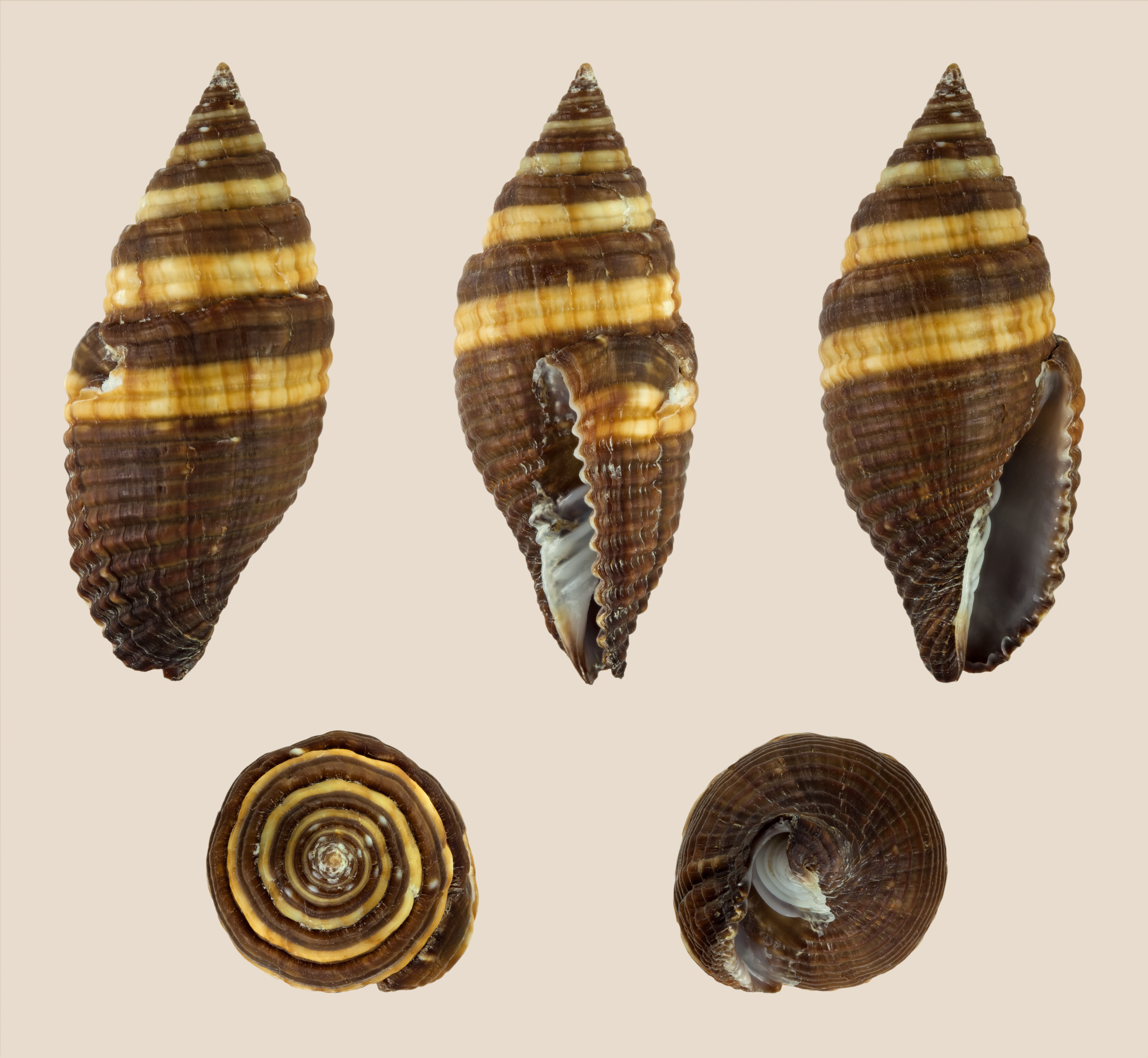
- Shell of Strigatella aurantia

Scientific classification
- Kingdom: Animalia
- Phylum: Mollusca
- Class: Gastropoda
- Subclass: Caenogastropoda
- Order: Neogastropoda
- Family: Mitridae
- Genus: Strigatella
- Species: S. aurantia

Binomial name
- Strigatella aurantia (Gmelin, 1791)

Synonyms
- Mitra minuta Röding, P.F., 1798; Mitra aurantia (Gmelin, 1791); Mitra limacina Lamarck, J.B.P.A. de, 1811; Mitra peronii Lamarck, J.B.P.A. de, 1811; Mitra crassa Swainson, 1822; Mitra michelinii Guérin-Méneville, 1831; Mitra obliqua Lesson, R.P., 1842; Mitra limbifera Lamarck, 1844; Mitra caeligena Reeve, L.A., 1844; Mitra consolidata Sowerby, G.B. II & III, 1874; Nebularia aurantia (Gmelin, 1791); Strigatella crassa (Swainson, 1822); Voluta aurantia Gmelin, 1791 (original combination)

= Strigatella aurantia =

Species of gastropod

Strigatella aurantia (common name: orange mitre) is a species of sea snail, a marine gastropod mollusk in the family Mitridae, the miters or miter snails.

== Description ==
The adult shell size varies between 21 mm and 58 mm

== Distribution ==
This species occurs in the Red Sea, in the Indian Ocean at Mozambique, and in the Pacific Ocean at Papua New Guinea and the Solomons.
