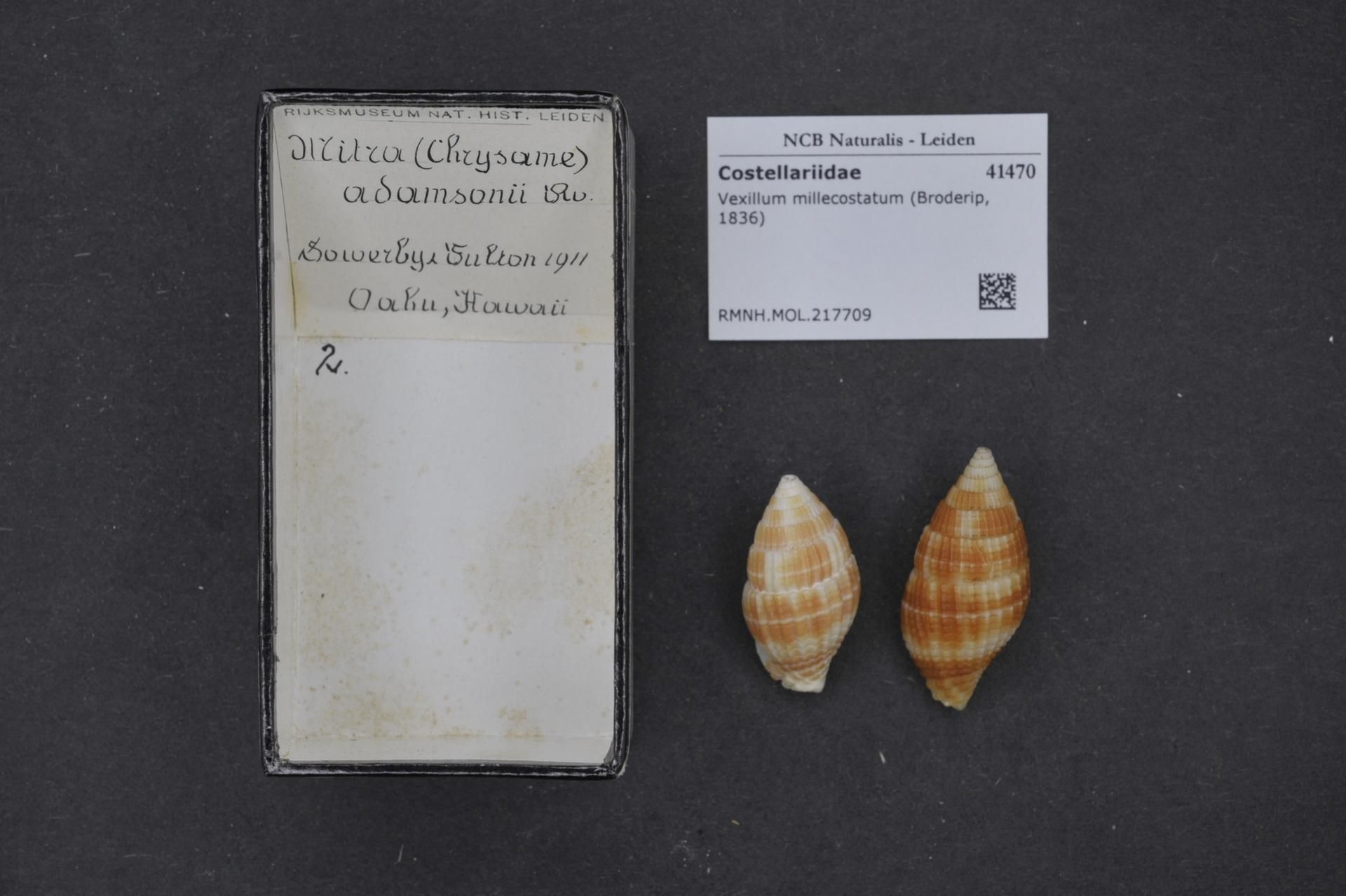
- Shell of Vexillum millecostatum (specimen at Naturalis Biodiversity Center)

Scientific classification
- Kingdom: Animalia
- Phylum: Mollusca
- Class: Gastropoda
- Subclass: Caenogastropoda
- Order: Neogastropoda
- Family: Costellariidae
- Genus: Vexillum
- Species: V. millecostatum

Binomial name
- Vexillum millecostatum (Broderip, 1836)

Synonyms
- Mitra (Pusia) evelynae Melvill, 1895 junior subjective synonym; Mitra adamsoni Reeve, 1844; Mitra antonii Küster, 1839; Tiara millecostata Broderip, 1836 (original combination); Vexillum (Pusia) millecostatum (Broderip, 1836); Vexillum evelynae (Melvill, 1895)

= Vexillum millecostatum =

Species of gastropod

Vexillum millecostatum is a species of small sea snail, marine gastropod mollusk in the family Costellariidae, the ribbed miters.

== Description ==
The length of the shell varies between 19 mm and 30 mm.

The solid, elongate shell has an oblong-fusiform shape. The shell contains nine whorls with impressed sutures. It is closely, finely longitudinally ribbed, with impressed revolving striae at the base. The aperture is oblong and auriculate. The columella is four-plaited. It is orange yellow to dark chestnut-brown, sometimes with two interrupted lighter bands.

== Distribution ==
This species occurs in the Eastern Indian Ocean and western and central Pacific Ocean; also off Papua New Guinea and Australia (Queensland).
