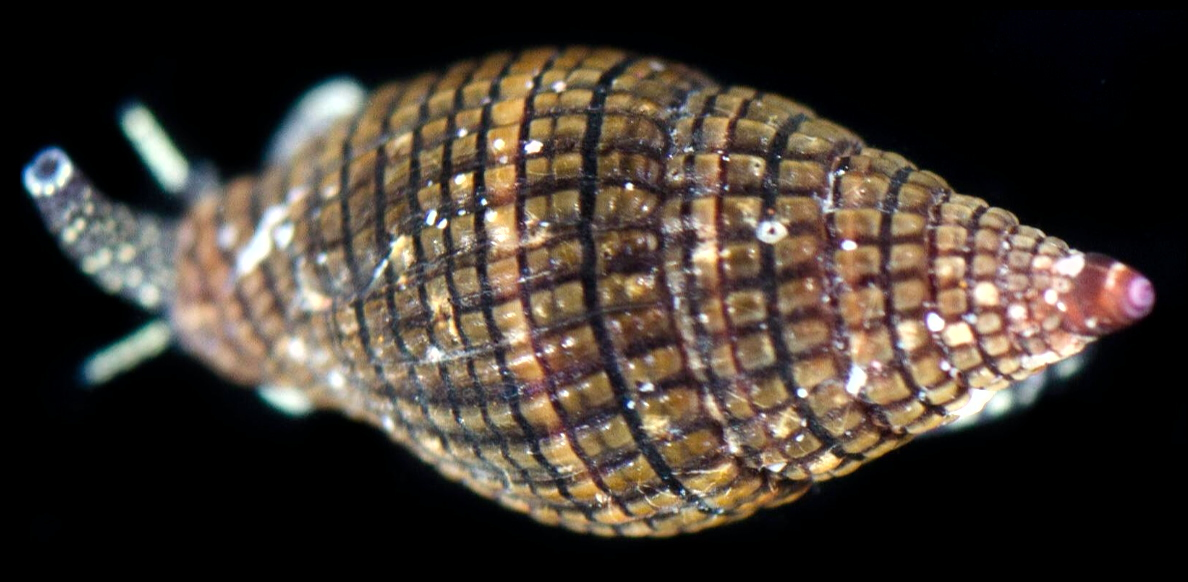
- Vexillum piceum (specimen at the Smithsonian Institution)

Scientific classification
- Kingdom: Animalia
- Phylum: Mollusca
- Class: Gastropoda
- Subclass: Caenogastropoda
- Order: Neogastropoda
- Superfamily: Turbinelloidea
- Family: Costellariidae
- Genus: Vexillum
- Species: V. piceum

Binomial name
- Vexillum piceum (Pease, 1860)

Synonyms
- Pusia piceum (Pease, 1860); Strigatella picea Pease, 1860 (original combination); Turricula (Pusia) putillus Pease, 1865; Turricula putillus Pease, 1865; Vexillum (Pusia) piceum (Pease, 1860)

= Vexillum piceum =

Species of gastropod

Vexillum piceum is a species of small sea snail, marine gastropod mollusk in the family Costellariidae, the ribbed miters.

== Description ==
The shell is abbreviately fusiform, somewhat ventricose. The whole surface is decussated by narrow grooves, the longitudinal grooves are finely striated. The spire is rather short and acute. The sutures are well impressed. The aperture is strongly lirate within. The outer lip is denticulate. The columella is four-plaited. The shell is black. The spire and upper part of the body whorl are spotted with white, occasionally encircled with a single narrow white band. The transverse grooves are reddish-brown.

== Distribution ==
This marine species occurs off Hawaii.
