= Carinomitra typha =

Scientific classification
- Kingdom: Animalia
- Phylum: Mollusca
- Class: Gastropoda
- Subclass: Caenogastropoda
- Order: Neogastropoda
- Superfamily: Mitroidea
- Family: Mitridae
- Genus: Carinomitra
- Species: C. typha

Binomial name
- Carinomitra typha (Reeve, 1845)

Synonyms
- Mitra (Strigatella) typha Reeve, 1845; Mitra micans Reeve, 1845; Mitra tenuis G. B. Sowerby II, 1874; Mitra typha Reeve, 1845; Strigatella typha (Reeve, 1845) · unaccepted; Thala alba Pease, 1868

Species of gastropod

Carinomitra typha is a species of sea snail, a marine gastropod mollusk in the family Mitridae, the miters or miter snails.

== Description ==
The shell is transparent, horny, very pyramidal, with a light fulvous band on the upper part of the whorls. The spire is acuminate. The aperture equals the spire in length.

== Distribution ==
This marine species occurs off the Philippines.
