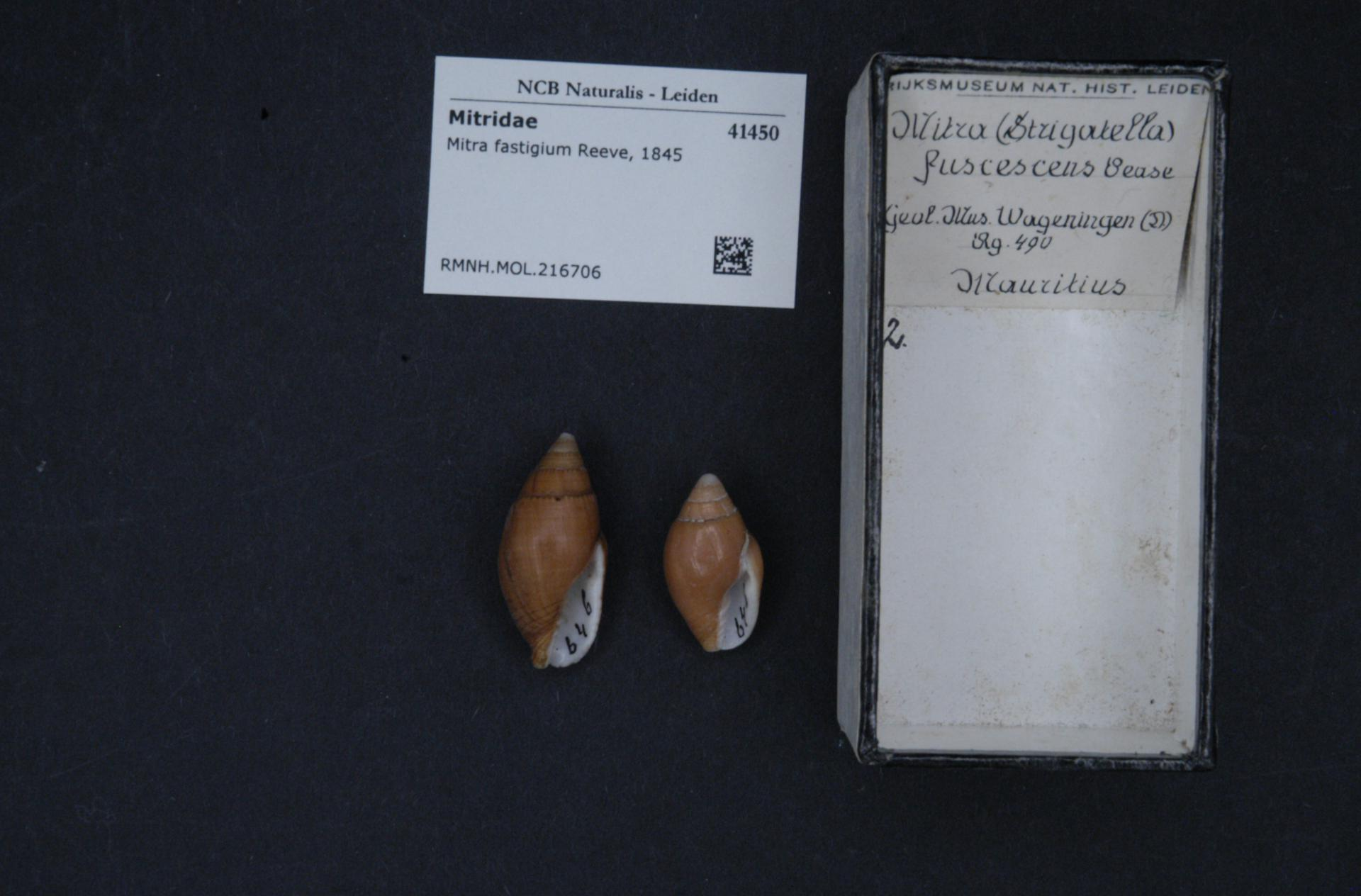

Scientific classification
- Kingdom: Animalia
- Phylum: Mollusca
- Class: Gastropoda
- Subclass: Caenogastropoda
- Order: Neogastropoda
- Family: Mitridae
- Genus: Nebularia
- Species: N. fastigium

Binomial name
- Nebularia fastigium (Reeve, 1845)

Synonyms
- Mitra (Strigatella) fastigium Reeve, 1845; Mitra punctata Swainson, W.A., 1829; Mitra fuscescens Pease, W.H., 1860; Mitra brunnea Pease, 1868; Mitra nitilina (Spry, 1961); Strigatella brunnea (Pease, 1868); Strigatella nitilina Spry, 1961

= Nebularia fastigium =

Species of gastropod

Nebularia fastigium is a species of sea snail, a marine gastropod mollusc in the family Mitridae, the miters or miter snails.

== Description ==
The shell size varies between 20 mm and 31 mm.

== Distribution ==
This species is distributed in the Indian Ocean along Tanzania and the Mascarene Basin; in the Pacific Ocean along New Zealand.
