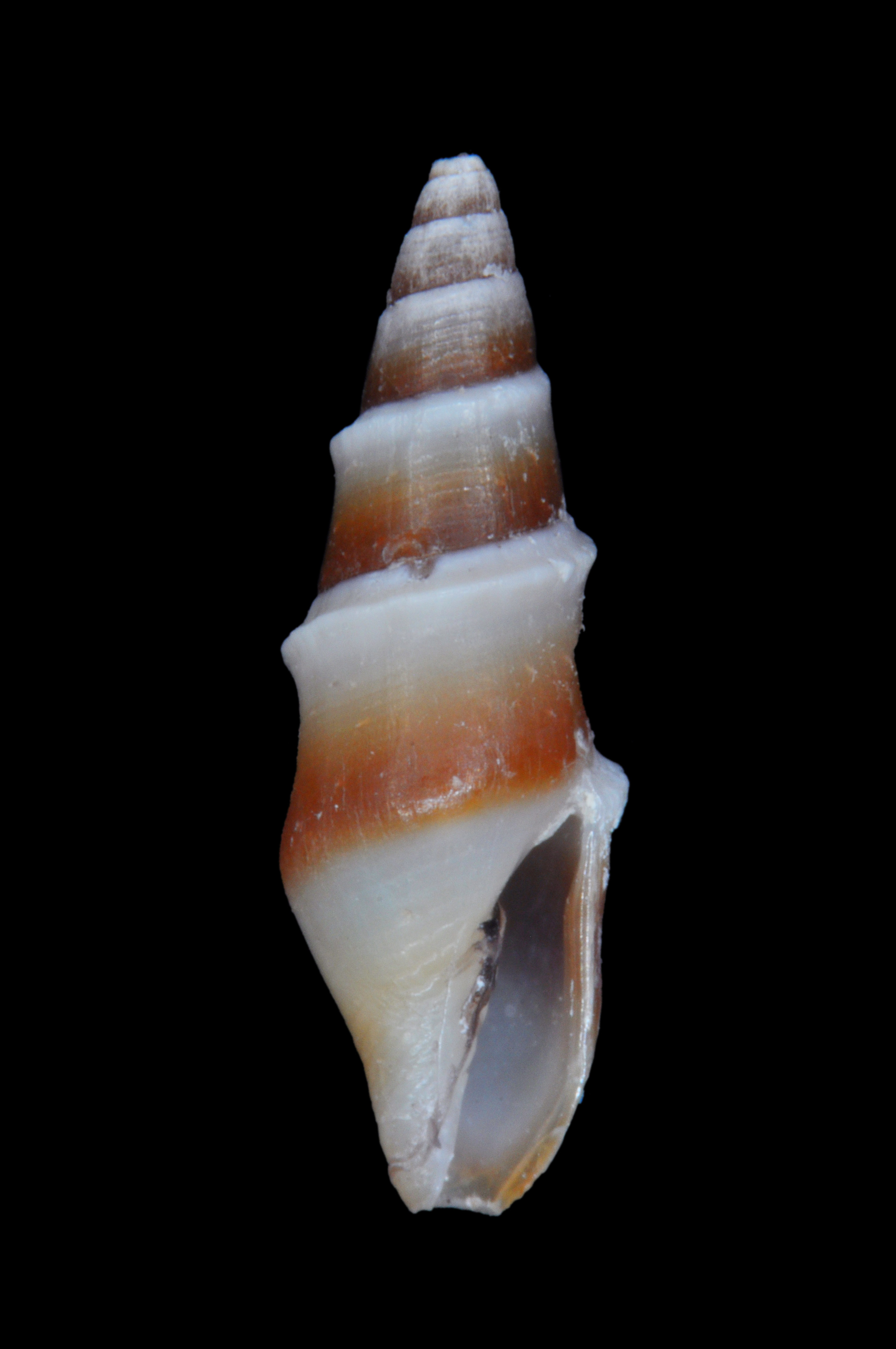
- Shell of Carinomitra peculiaris (specimen at MNHN, Paris)

Scientific classification
- Kingdom: Animalia
- Phylum: Mollusca
- Class: Gastropoda
- Subclass: Caenogastropoda
- Order: Neogastropoda
- Family: Mitridae
- Genus: Carinomitra
- Species: C. peculiaris

Binomial name
- Carinomitra peculiaris (Reeve, 1845)

Synonyms
- Mitra (Strigatella) peculiaris Reeve, 1845; Mitra peculiaris Reeve, 1845; Strigatella peculiaris (Reeve, 1845)

= Carinomitra peculiaris =

Species of gastropod

Carinomitra peculiaris is a species of sea snail, a marine gastropod mollusk in the family Mitridae, the miters or miter snails.

== Distribution ==
This marine species occurs off Papua New Guinea and the Philippines.
