= Vexillum oleacea =

Scientific classification
- Kingdom: Animalia
- Phylum: Mollusca
- Class: Gastropoda
- Subclass: Caenogastropoda
- Order: Neogastropoda
- Superfamily: Turbinelloidea
- Family: Costellariidae
- Genus: Vexillum
- Species: V. oleacea

Binomial name
- Vexillum oleacea (Reeve, 1844)

Synonyms
- Mitra nigra Quoy & Gaimard, 1833; Mitra oleacea Reeve, 1844; Mitra quoyi Deshayes, 1844; Strigatella oleacea (Reeve, 1844); Zierliana oleacea (Reeve, 1844)

Species of gastropod

Vexillum oleacea is a species of sea snail, a marine gastropod mollusk, in the family Costellariidae, the ribbed miters.
