= M. lutea =

M. lutea may refer to:

- Malephora lutea, a succulent plant
- Malthopsis lutea, a bottom-dwelling fish
- Mangelia lutea, a sea snail
- Marginella lutea, a margin shell
- Markhamia lutea, a plant native to eastern Africa
- Massilia lutea, a gram-negative bacterium
- Mbipia lutea, a cichlid endemic to Lake Victoria
- Melaleuca lutea, a dicotyledonous plant
- Melanella lutea, a sea snail
- Mesolimnophila lutea, a crane fly
- Mitra lutea, a miter snail
- Mitrasacme lutea, a flowering plant
- Monochaetia lutea, a fungus that forms its spores in a sac-like ascus
- Monopsis lutea, a herbaceous plant
- Mordellistena lutea, a tumbling flower beetle
- Mordellochroidea lutea, a tumbling flower beetle
- Motacilla lutea, an insectivorous passerine
- Musa lutea, a gigantic herb
- Myceliophthora lutea, a fungus that forms its spores in a sac-like ascus
- Mycoacia lutea, a corticioid fungus
- Myrmicaria lutea, an ant with seven-segmented antennae
