= M. nivea =

M. nivea may refer to:

- Mitra nivea, a sea snail species
- Mitranthes nivea, a plant species endemic to Jamaica
- Mucuna nivea, a synonym for Mucuna pruriens

== See also ==
- Nivea (disambiguation)
