= Nebularia thachi =

Scientific classification
- Kingdom: Animalia
- Phylum: Mollusca
- Class: Gastropoda
- Subclass: Caenogastropoda
- Order: Neogastropoda
- Family: Mitridae
- Genus: Nebularia
- Species: N. thachi

Binomial name
- Nebularia thachi H. Turner, 2007

Synonyms
- Mitra thachi H. Turner, 2007

Species of gastropod

Nebularia thachi is a species of sea snail, a marine gastropod mollusc in the family Mitridae, the miters or miter snails.
