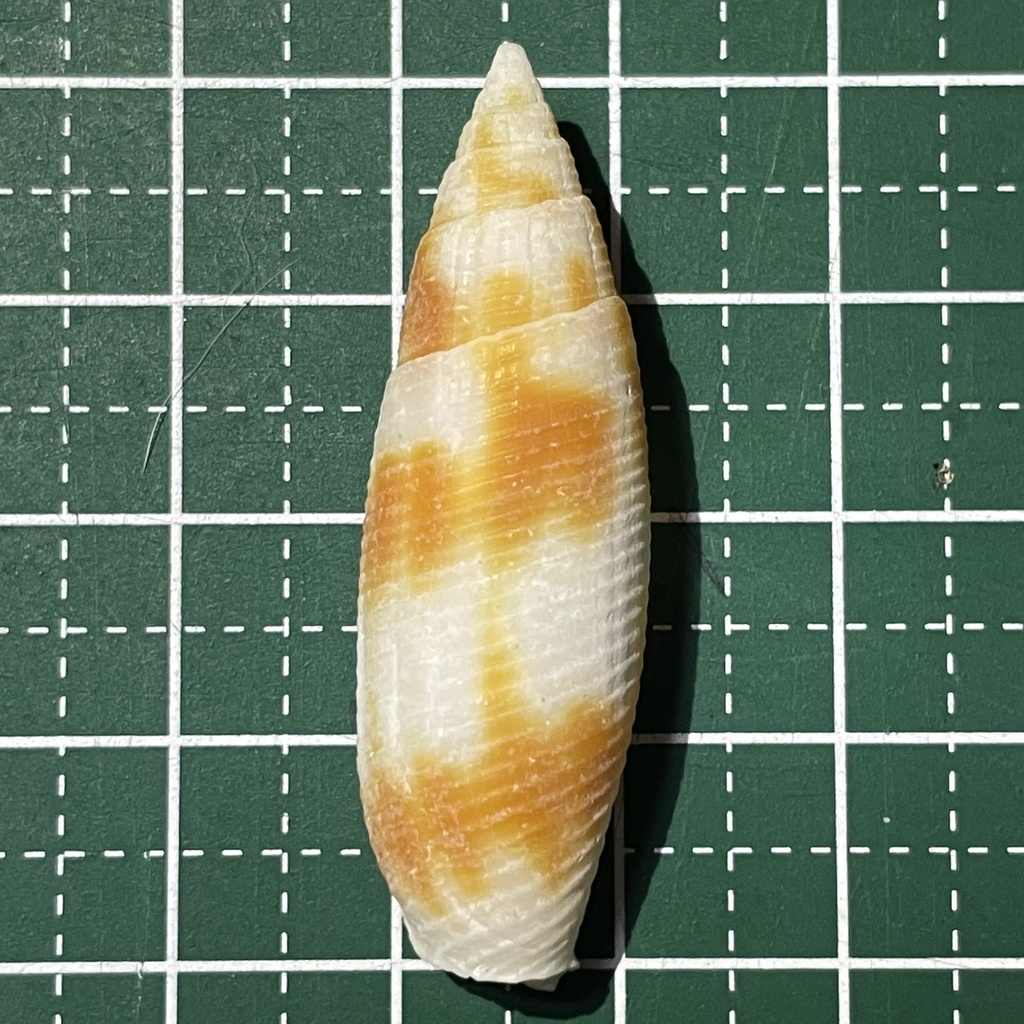
- Dorsal view of a shell of Nebularia edentula

Scientific classification
- Kingdom: Animalia
- Phylum: Mollusca
- Class: Gastropoda
- Subclass: Caenogastropoda
- Order: Neogastropoda
- Family: Mitridae
- Genus: Nebularia
- Species: N. edentula

Binomial name
- Nebularia edentula (Swainson, 1823)

Synonyms
- Conus edentulus Reeve, 1844; Dibaphus edentulus (Swainson, 1823); Dibaphus philippi Crosse, 1858; Mitra (Dibaphus) edentula Swainson, 1823; Mitra edentula Swainson, 1823; Pterygia edentula Swainson, 1823

= Nebularia edentula =

Species of sea snail

Nebularia edentula, common name the toothless mitre, is a species of sea snail, a marine gastropod mollusc in the family Mitridae, the miters or miter snails.

== Description ==
The shell size varies between 20 millimetres (0.79 in) and 40 millimetres (1.6 in). One recorded specimen had a body mass of 6.93 g and a volume of 3.96 cm³.

The shell is cylindrically fusiform (spindle-shaped). As suggested by its specific epithet edentula (meaning "toothless"), this species is known for a lack of strong columellar folds that are usually characteristic of the family Mitridae. The shell coloration typically consists of a cream or yellowish background patterned with reddish-brown spiral bands or irregular blotches.

The living animal possesses lens eyes and moves via mucus-mediated gliding.

== Distribution ==
This species is distributed in the Indo-West Pacific. Locations where it has been recorded include:

- The Mascarene Basin (including Mauritius)
- Aldabra
- Mozambique
- The Philippines
- French Polynesia (specifically the Tuamotu Archipelago)

== Ecology ==
Nebularia edentula is a benthic species that lives in tropical, marine environments. It inhabits the neritic zone.

Like other members of the Mitridae, it is a carnivorous predator. The species utilizes sexual reproduction; it is a non-broadcast spawner, meaning it likely lays capsules rather than releasing eggs directly into the water column. The life cycle does not include a free-swimming trochophore stage.

== Bibliography ==
- Cernohorsky W. O. (1976). The Mitrinae of the World. Indo-Pacific Mollusca 3(17) page(s): 469.
- Drivas, J. & M. Jay (1988). Coquillages de La Réunion et de l'île Maurice.
- Filmer R.M. (2001). A Catalogue of Nomenclature and Taxonomy in the Living Conidae 1758 - 1998. Backhuys Publishers, Leiden. 388pp.
- Poppe, G.T. (2008) Philippine Marine Mollusks. Vol. 2. Hackenheim: ConchBooks.
