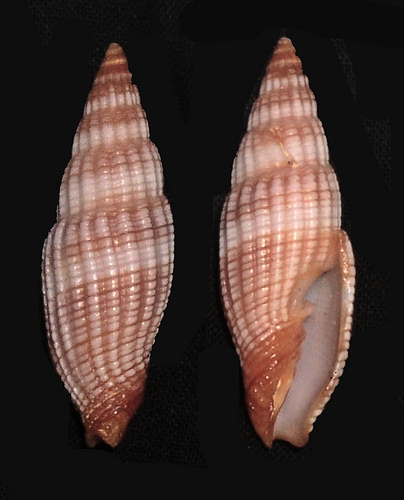

Scientific classification
- Kingdom: Animalia
- Phylum: Mollusca
- Class: Gastropoda
- Subclass: Caenogastropoda
- Order: Neogastropoda
- Family: Mitridae
- Genus: Nebularia
- Species: N. pyramis

Binomial name
- Nebularia pyramis (Wood, 1828)

Synonyms
- Mitra (Nebularia) pyramis (Wood, 1828); Mitra pyramis (Wood, 1828); Voluta pyramis Wood, 1828

= Nebularia pyramis =

Species of gastropod

Nebularia pyramis (common name: Pyramis mitre) is a species of sea snail, a marine gastropod mollusc in the family Mitridae, the miters or miter snails.

== Description ==
The shell size is 50 mm (2.0 in), but 70 mm. giants are known from the Philippines.

== Distribution ==
This species is distributed in the Indian Ocean in the Mascarene Basin and in the Indo-West Pacific.
