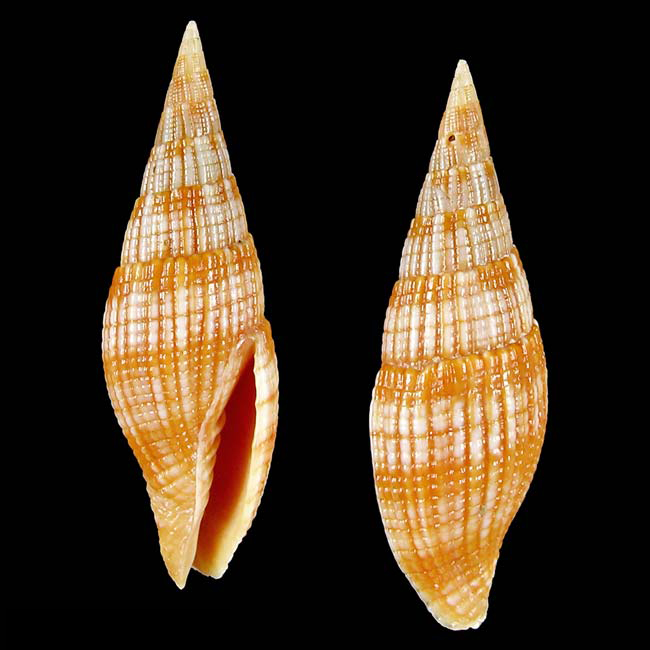
- Shell of Nebularia baerorum (paratype at MNHN, Paris)

Scientific classification
- Kingdom: Animalia
- Phylum: Mollusca
- Class: Gastropoda
- Subclass: Caenogastropoda
- Order: Neogastropoda
- Family: Mitridae
- Genus: Nebularia
- Species: N. baerorum

Binomial name
- Nebularia baerorum (Poppe & Tagaro, 2010)

Synonyms
- Mitra baerorum Poppe & Tagaro, 2010 (original combination)

= Nebularia baerorum =

Species of gastropod

Nebularia baerorum is a species of sea snail, a marine gastropod mollusc in the family Mitridae.

== Description ==
Shell size 55 - 60 mm.

== Distribution ==
This marine species occurs off the Philippines.

== Original description ==
- (of Mitra baerorum Poppe & Tagaro, 2010) Poppe G. & Tagaro S. (2010) New species of Haloceratidae, Columbellidae, Buccinidae, Mitridae, Costellariidae, Amathinidae and Spondylidae from the Philippines. Visaya 3(1):73-93.
