= Nebularia peasei =

Scientific classification
- Kingdom: Animalia
- Phylum: Mollusca
- Class: Gastropoda
- Subclass: Caenogastropoda
- Order: Neogastropoda
- Family: Mitridae
- Subfamily: Cylindromitrinae
- Genus: Nebularia
- Species: N. peasei

Binomial name
- Nebularia peasei (Dohrn, 1860)

Synonyms
- Mitra peasei Dohrn, 1860 (original combination); Mitra vezzaronellyae T. Cossignani, 2016

Species of gastropod

Nebularia peasei is a species of sea snail, a marine gastropod mollusk, in the family Mitridae, the miters or miter snails.

== Distribution ==
This species occurs in Vietnamese part of the South China Sea. and occurs off Australia.
