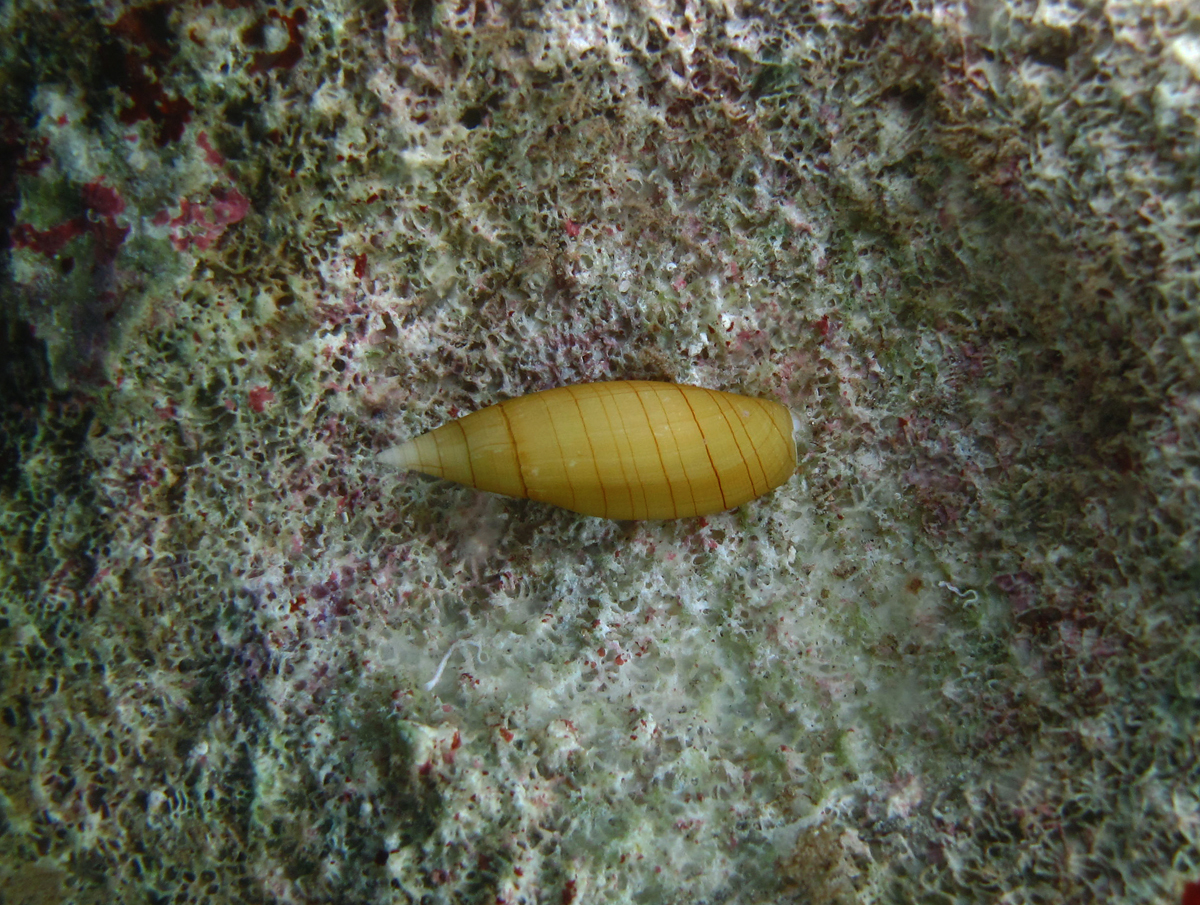

Scientific classification
- Kingdom: Animalia
- Phylum: Mollusca
- Class: Gastropoda
- Subclass: Caenogastropoda
- Order: Neogastropoda
- Family: Mitridae
- Genus: Nebularia
- Species: N. multiplicata

Binomial name
- Nebularia multiplicata Pease, 1865

Synonyms
- Mitra multiplicata Pease, 1865; Mitroidea multiplicata Pease, 1865

= Nebularia multiplicata =

Species of gastropod

Nebularia multiplicata is a species of sea snail, a marine gastropod mollusc in the family Mitridae, the miters or miter snails.

== Description ==
Shell size 25 mm.

== Distribution ==
Christmas Island, Australia.
