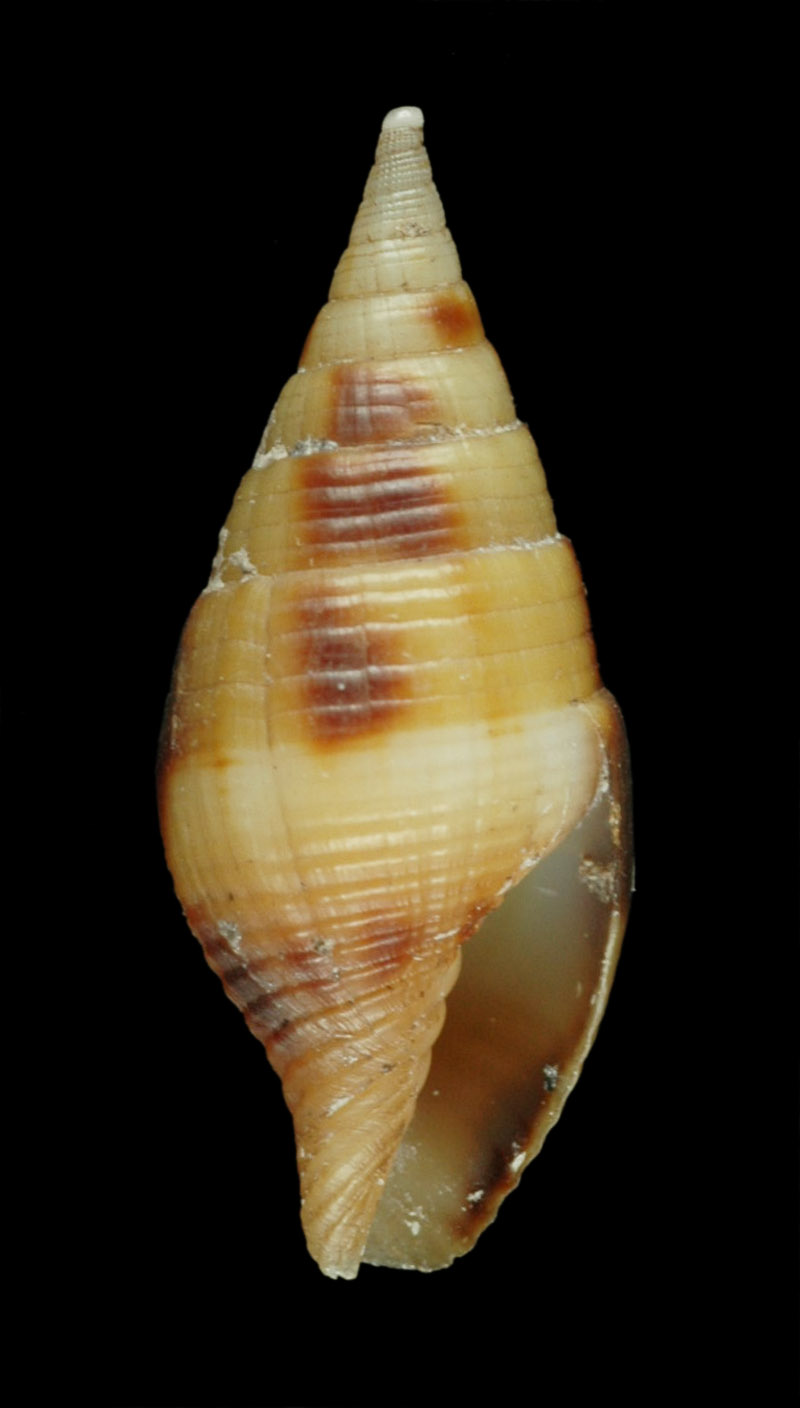
- Shell of Nebularia contracta (specimen at MNHN, Paris)

Scientific classification
- Kingdom: Animalia
- Phylum: Mollusca
- Class: Gastropoda
- Subclass: Caenogastropoda
- Order: Neogastropoda
- Family: Mitridae
- Genus: Nebularia
- Species: N. contracta

Binomial name
- Nebularia contracta (Swainson, 1820)

Synonyms
- Mitra (Nebularia) contracta Swainson, 1820; Mitra contracta Swainson, 1820

= Nebularia contracta =

Species of gastropod

Nebularia contracta is a species of sea snail, a marine gastropod mollusc in the family Mitridae, the miters or miter snails.

== Description ==
Shell size 35-40 mm.

== Distribution ==
This marine species occurs off Papua New Guinea.
