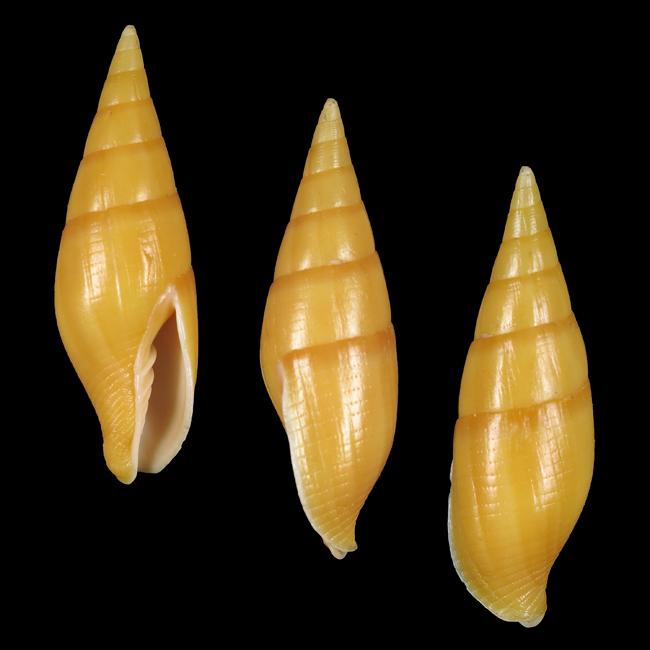
- Shell of Nebularia gourgueti

Scientific classification
- Kingdom: Animalia
- Phylum: Mollusca
- Class: Gastropoda
- Subclass: Caenogastropoda
- Order: Neogastropoda
- Family: Mitridae
- Subfamily: Cylindromitrinae
- Genus: Nebularia
- Species: N. gourgueti

Binomial name
- Nebularia gourgueti (Poppe, Tagaro & Salisbury, 2009)

Synonyms
- Mitra gourgueti Poppe, R. Salisbury & Tagaro, 2015 (original combination)

= Nebularia gourgueti =

Species of gastropod

Nebularia gourgueti is a species of sea snail, a marine gastropod mollusc in the family Mitridae. It was discovered and named by researchers Poppe, R. Salisbury & Tagaro.

== Description ==
The length of the shell attains 27.7 mm.

== Distribution ==
This marine species occurs off Tahiti, French Polynesia.
