= Nebularia guidopoppei =

Scientific classification
- Kingdom: Animalia
- Phylum: Mollusca
- Class: Gastropoda
- Subclass: Caenogastropoda
- Order: Neogastropoda
- Superfamily: Mitroidea
- Family: Mitridae
- Subfamily: Cylindromitrinae
- Genus: Nebularia
- Species: N. guidopoppei

Binomial name
- Nebularia guidopoppei (Thach, 2016)

Synonyms
- Mitra guidopoppei Thach, 2016

Species of gastropod

Nebularia guidopoppei is a species of sea snail, a marine gastropod mollusk, in the family Mitridae, the miters or miter snails.
