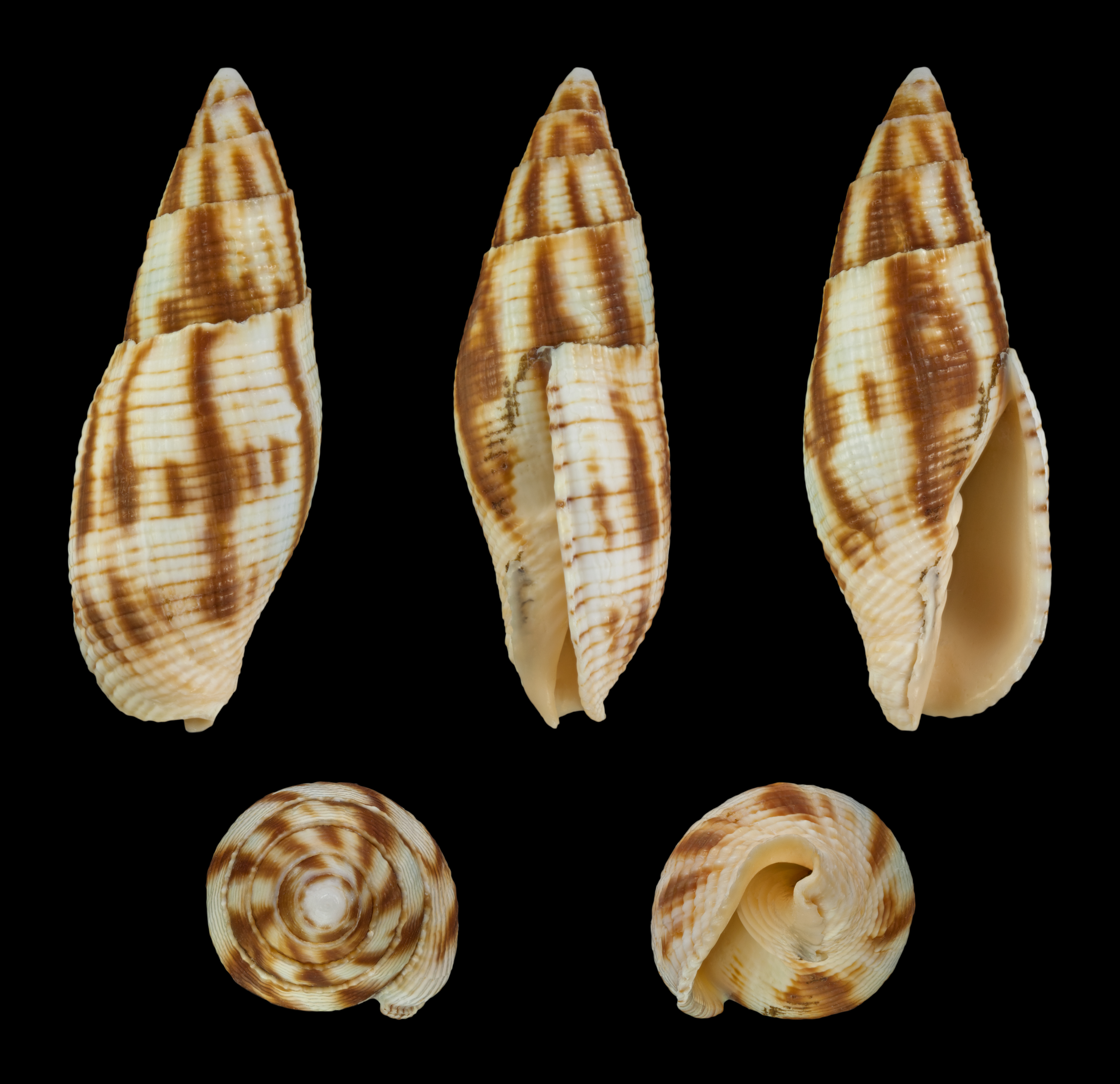

Scientific classification
- Kingdom: Animalia
- Phylum: Mollusca
- Class: Gastropoda
- Subclass: Caenogastropoda
- Order: Neogastropoda
- Family: Mitridae
- Genus: Nebularia
- Species: N. eremitarum

Binomial name
- Nebularia eremitarum (Röding, 1798)

Synonyms
- Mitra adusta Lamarck, J.B.P.A. de, 1811; Mitra flavofusca Lamarck, J.B.P.A. de, 1811; Voluta ruffina Dillwyn, L.W., 1817; Mitra terebralis Swainson, W.A., 1840

= Nebularia eremitarum =

Species of gastropod

Nebularia eremitarum (common name: adusta mitre) is a species of sea snail, a marine gastropod mollusk in the family Mitridae, the miters or miter snails.

== Description ==
The shell size varies between 38 to 86 millimetres (1.5 to 3.4 in).

== Distribution ==
This species is distributed in the Red Sea and in the Pacific Ocean along Fiji, Papua New Guinea and the Philippines.
