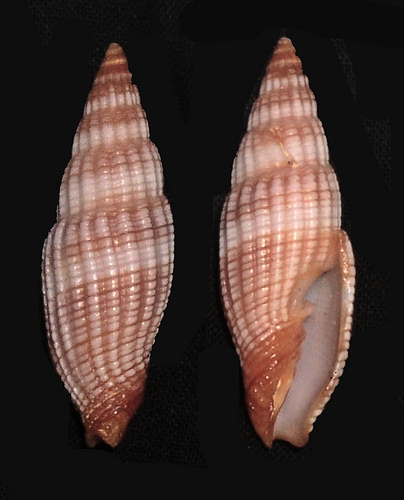
- Shell of Nebularia pyramis

Scientific classification
- Kingdom: Animalia
- Phylum: Mollusca
- Class: Gastropoda
- Subclass: Caenogastropoda
- Order: Neogastropoda
- Family: Mitridae
- Subfamily: Cylindromitrinae
- Genus: Nebularia; Swainson, 1840

Type species
- Mitra contracta Swainson, 1820

Synonyms
- Dibaphus Philippi, 1847; Mauritia H. Adams, 1869 (invalid: junior homonym of Mauritia Troschel, 1863); Mitra (Dibaphus) Philippi, 1847; Mitra (Mutyca) H. Adams & A. Adams, 1853 (original rank); Mitra (Nebularia) Swainson, 1840 (original rank); Mitroidea Pease, 1865; Mutyca H. Adams & A. Adams, 1853

= Nebularia =

Genus of gastropods

Nebularia is a genus of predatory sea snails, marine gastropod mollusks in the subfamily Cylindromitrinae within the family of Mitridae. This name was originally proposed as a subgenus of the genus Mitra. The type species of this genus is Mitra contracta Swainson, 1820.

== Taxonomy ==
In 1991, Cernohorsky considered that the subgenus Nebularia does not form a well-defined group.

In 2001, Thorsson and Salisbury used the tern Nebularia as a group (and not as a valid taxonomic name), for species related to the type species Mitra coronata.

== Description ==
The shell is impressed with transverse grooves. The body whorl is anteriorly contracted. The aperture is narrow behind, effuse in front. The margin of the outer lip is smooth.

== Species ==
The genus Nebularia contains the following species:

- Nebularia acuminata (Swainson, 1824)
- Nebularia aegra (Reeve, 1845)
- Nebularia ancillides (Broderip, 1836)
- Nebularia baerorum (Poppe & Tagaro, 2010)
- Nebularia bellula (A. Adams, 1853)
- Nebularia chrysostoma (Broderip, 1836)
- Nebularia coarctata (Reeve, 1844)
- Nebularia contracta (Swainson, 1820)
- Nebularia dondani (Cernohorsky, 1985)
- Nebularia edentula (Swainson, 1823)
- Nebularia eremitarum (Röding, 1798)
- Nebularia fastigium (Reeve, 1845)
- Nebularia ferruginea (Lamarck, 1811)
- Nebularia gourgueti (Poppe, R. Salisbury & Tagaro, 2015)
- Nebularia guidopoppei (Thach, 2016)
- Nebularia hangji S.-I Huang & Q.-Y. Chuo, 2019
- Nebularia ignobilis (Reeve, 1844)
- Nebularia incompta ([Lightfoot], 1786)
- Nebularia inquinata (Reeve, 1844)
- Nebularia kanak S.-I Huang, 2021
- Nebularia mackayorum S.-I Huang & Q.-Y. Chuo, 2019
- Nebularia multiplicata (Pease, 1865)
- Nebularia nebulosa (Broderip, 1836)
- Nebularia nivea (Broderip, 1836)
- Nebularia peasei (Dohrn, 1860)
- Nebularia pellisserpentis (Reeve, 1844)
- Nebularia petrosa (G. B. Sowerby II, 1874)
- Nebularia pyramis (W. Wood, 1828)
- †Nebularia soliphila Harzhauser & Landau, 2021
- Nebularia thachi (H. Turner, 2007)
- Nebularia tivoli S.-I Huang, 2021
- Nebularia ustulata (Reeve, 1844)
- Nebularia yafani S.-I Huang & Q.-Y. Chuo, 2019

Species brought into synonymy

- Nebularia ambigua (Swainson, 1829): synonym of Strigatella ambigua (Swainson, 1829)
- Nebularia aurantia (Gmelin, 1791): synonym of Strigatella aurantia (Gmelin, 1791)
- Nebularia aurora (Dohrn, 1861): synonym of Strigatella aurora (Dohrn, 1861)
- Nebularia coffea (Schubert & Wagner, 1829): synonym of Strigatella coffea (Schubert & J. A. Wagner, 1829)
- Nebularia coronata (Lamarck, 1811): synonym of Strigatella coronata (Lamarck, 1811)
- Nebularia deynzeri (Cernohorsky, 1980): synonym of Acromargarita deynzeri (Cernohorsky, 1980)
- Nebularia fulvescens (Broderip, 1836): synonym of Strigatella fulvescens (Broderip, 1836)
- Nebularia imperialis (Röding, 1798): synonym of Strigatella imperialis (Röding, 1798)
- Nebularia kamehameha (Pilsbry, 1921): synonym of Nebularia ustulata (Reeve, 1844)
- Nebularia luctuosa (A. Adams, 1853): synonym of Strigatella luctuosa (A. Adams, 1853)
- Nebularia rutila (A. Adams, 1853): synonym of Pseudonebularia rutila (A. Adams, 1853)
- Nebularia semperi (Poppe, Tagaro & R. Salisbury, 2009): synonym of Acromargarita semperi (Poppe, Tagaro & R. Salisbury, 2009)
- Nebularia vultuosa (Reeve, 1845): synonym of Strigatella vultuosa (Reeve, 1845)
- Nebularia yaekoae Habe & Kosuge, 1966: synonym of Scabricola yaekoae (Habe & Kosuge, 1966) (original combination)
