= Nebularia petrosa =

Scientific classification
- Kingdom: Animalia
- Phylum: Mollusca
- Class: Gastropoda
- Subclass: Caenogastropoda
- Order: Neogastropoda
- Superfamily: Mitroidea
- Family: Mitridae
- Subfamily: Cylindromitrinae
- Genus: Nebularia
- Species: N. petrosa

Binomial name
- Nebularia petrosa (G. B. Sowerby II, 1874)

Synonyms
- Mitra petrosa G. B. Sowerby II, 1874; Mutyca petrosa (G. B. Sowerby II, 1874)

Species of gastropod

Nebularia petrosa is a species of sea snail, a marine gastropod mollusk, in the family Mitridae, the miters or miter snails.

== Description ==
The thick shell is white. The spire is striated and fusiform. The spire is pyramidal. The whorls are sloped. The body whorl is tumid in middle. The aperture is as long as the spire and is channelled at the suture. The outer lip is smooth, thick, contracted anteriorly, rather angular, short and recurved over the siphonal canal. Shell size 40 mm.

== Distribution ==
Philippines.
