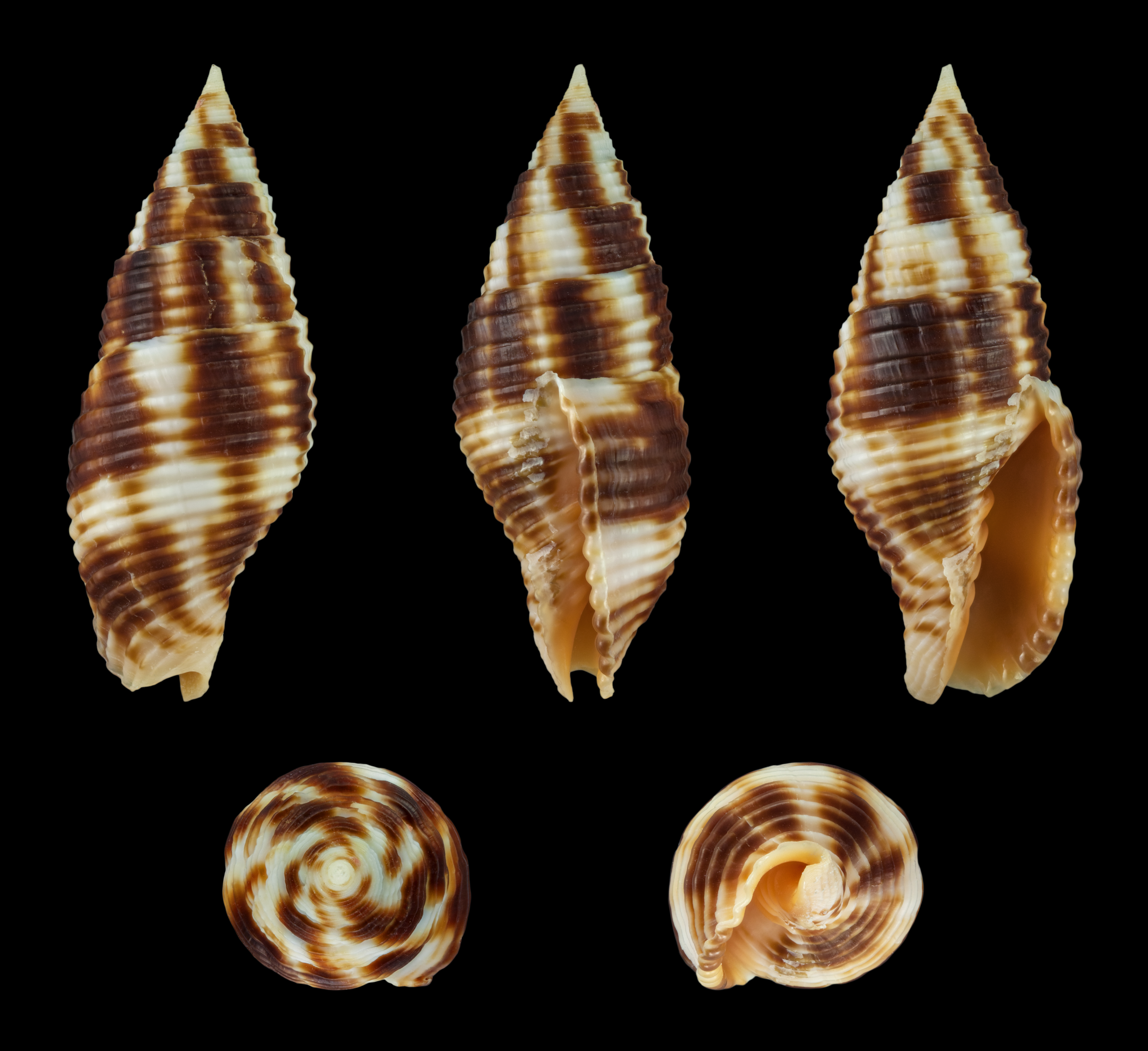

Scientific classification
- Kingdom: Animalia
- Phylum: Mollusca
- Class: Gastropoda
- Subclass: Caenogastropoda
- Order: Neogastropoda
- Family: Mitridae
- Genus: Nebularia
- Species: N. ferruginea

Binomial name
- Nebularia ferruginea (Lamarck, 1811)

Synonyms
- Mitra ferruginea Lamarck, 1811

= Nebularia ferruginea =

Species of gastropod

Nebularia ferruginea is a species of sea snail, a marine gastropod mollusc in the family Mitridae, the miters or miter snails.
