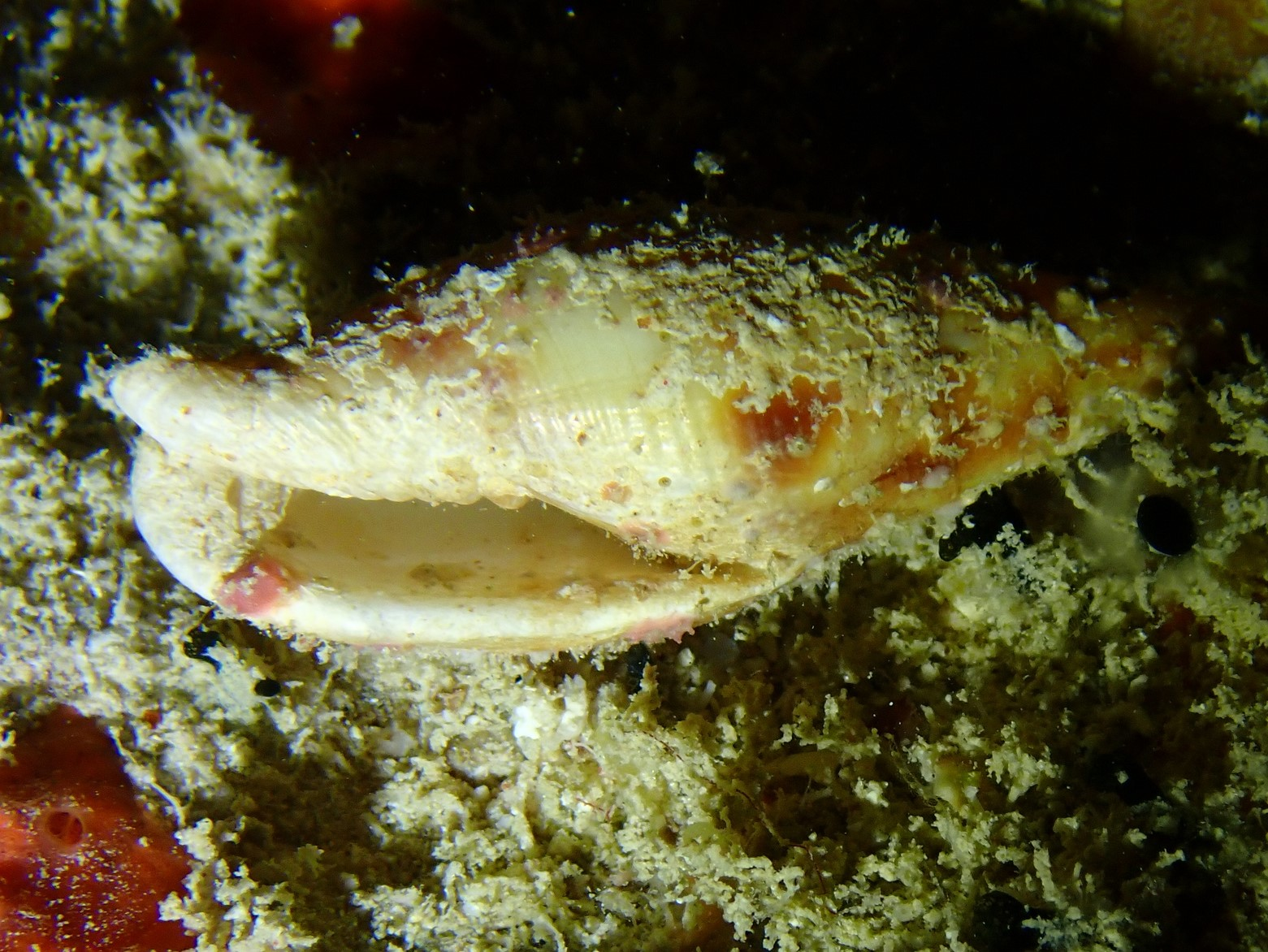

Scientific classification
- Kingdom: Animalia
- Phylum: Mollusca
- Class: Gastropoda
- Subclass: Caenogastropoda
- Order: Neogastropoda
- Superfamily: Mitroidea
- Family: Mitridae
- Subfamily: Cylindromitrinae
- Genus: Nebularia
- Species: N. nebulosa

Binomial name
- Nebularia nebulosa (Broderip, 1836)

Synonyms
- Mitra infecta Reeve, 1844; Mitra nebulosa Broderip, 1836

= Nebularia nebulosa =

Species of gastropod

Nebularia nebulosa is a species of sea snail, a marine gastropod mollusk, in the family Mitridae, the miters or miter snails.
