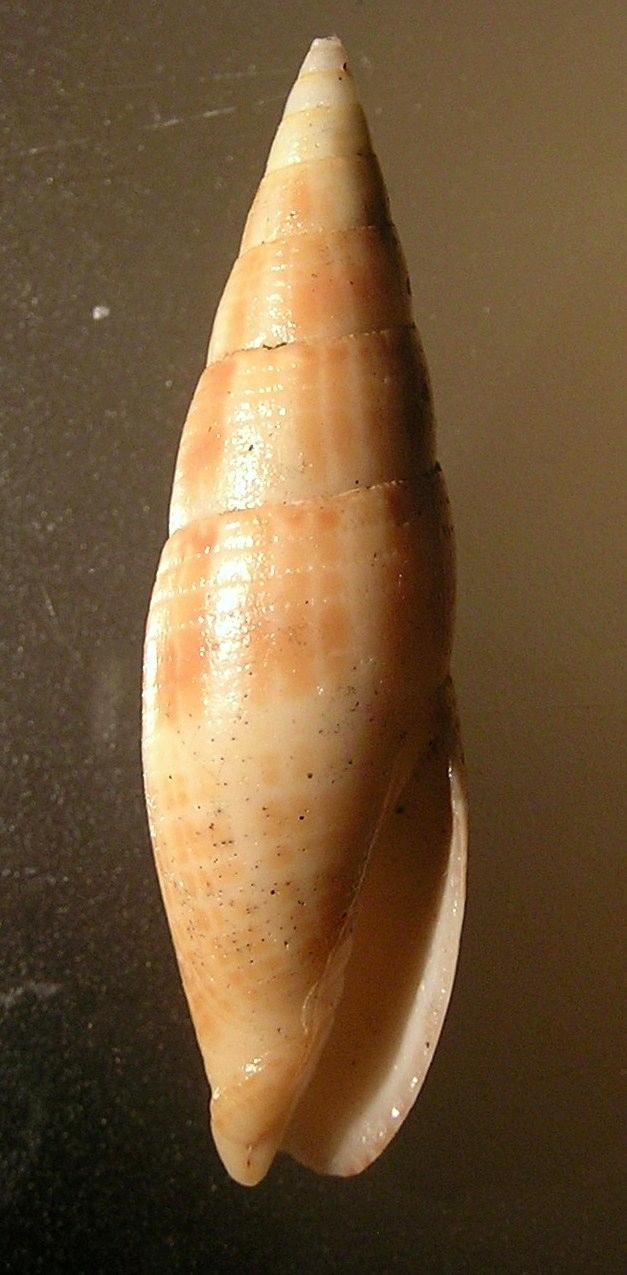

Scientific classification
- Kingdom: Animalia
- Phylum: Mollusca
- Class: Gastropoda
- Subclass: Caenogastropoda
- Order: Neogastropoda
- Family: Mitridae
- Genus: Nebularia
- Species: N. inquinata

Binomial name
- Nebularia inquinata (Reeve, 1844)

Synonyms
- Mitra inquinata Reeve, 1844

= Nebularia inquinata =

Species of gastropod

Nebularia inquinata is a species of sea snail, a marine gastropod mollusc in the family Mitridae, the miters or miter snails.
