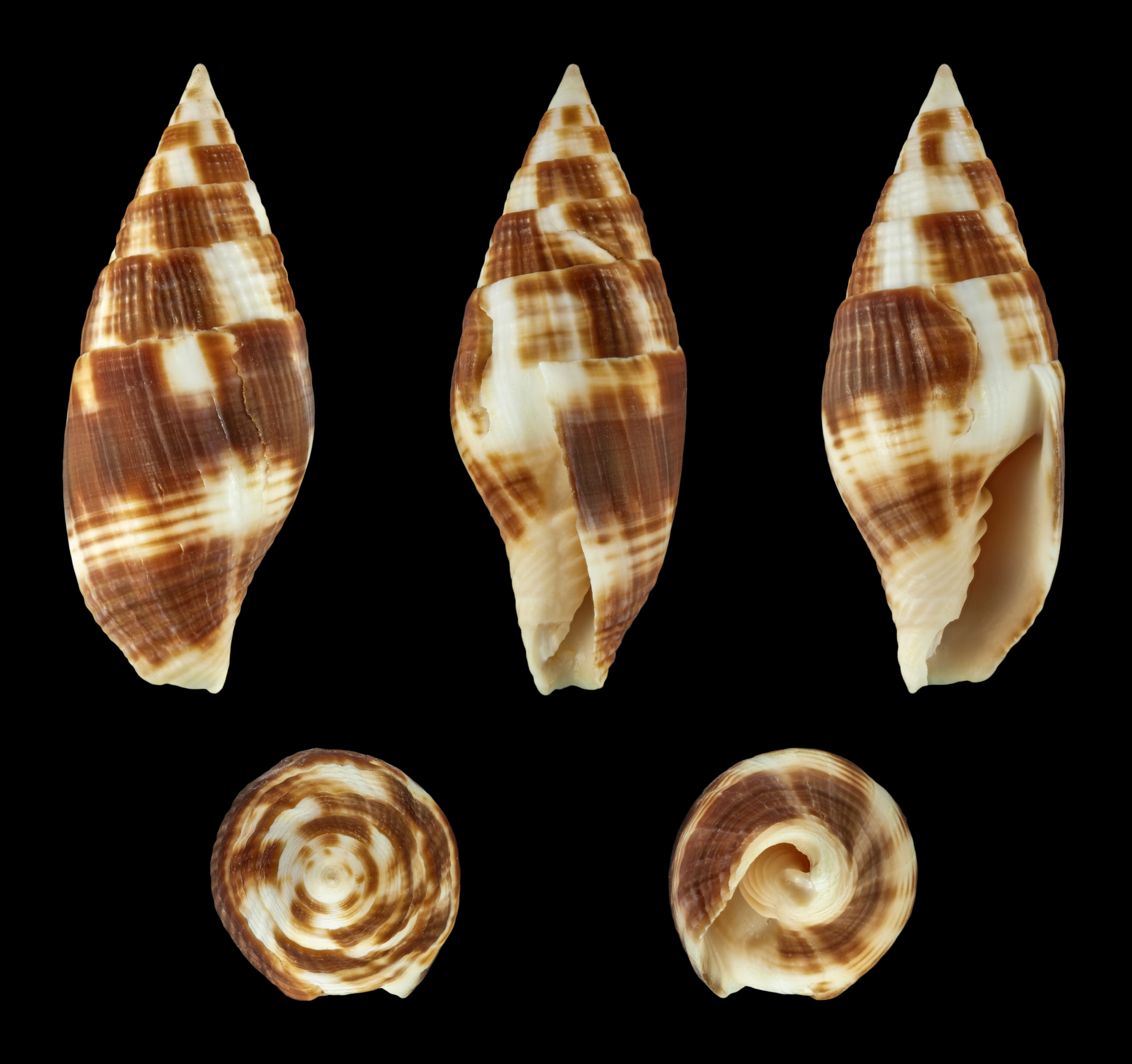

Scientific classification
- Kingdom: Animalia
- Phylum: Mollusca
- Class: Gastropoda
- Subclass: Caenogastropoda
- Order: Neogastropoda
- Family: Mitridae
- Genus: Nebularia
- Species: N. chrysostoma

Binomial name
- Nebularia chrysostoma (Broderip, 1936)

Synonyms
- Chrysame chrysostoma (Broderip, 1836); Mitra chrysostoma Broderip, 1836; Strigatella chrysostoma (Broderip, 1836)

= Nebularia chrysostoma =

Species of gastropod

Nebularia chrysostoma is a species of sea snail, a marine gastropod mollusc in the family Mitridae, the miters or miter snails.
