= Nebularia kamehameha =

Scientific classification
- Kingdom: Animalia
- Phylum: Mollusca
- Class: Gastropoda
- Subclass: Caenogastropoda
- Order: Neogastropoda
- Superfamily: Mitroidea
- Family: Mitridae
- Subfamily: Cylindromitrinae
- Genus: Nebularia
- Species: N. kamehameha

Binomial name
- Nebularia kamehameha (Pilsbry, 1921)

Synonyms
- Mitra kamehameha Pilsbry, 1921; Mutyca kamehameha (Pilsbry, 1921)

Species of gastropod

Nebularia kamehameha is a species of sea snail, a marine gastropod mollusk, in the family Mitridae, the miters or miter snails.
