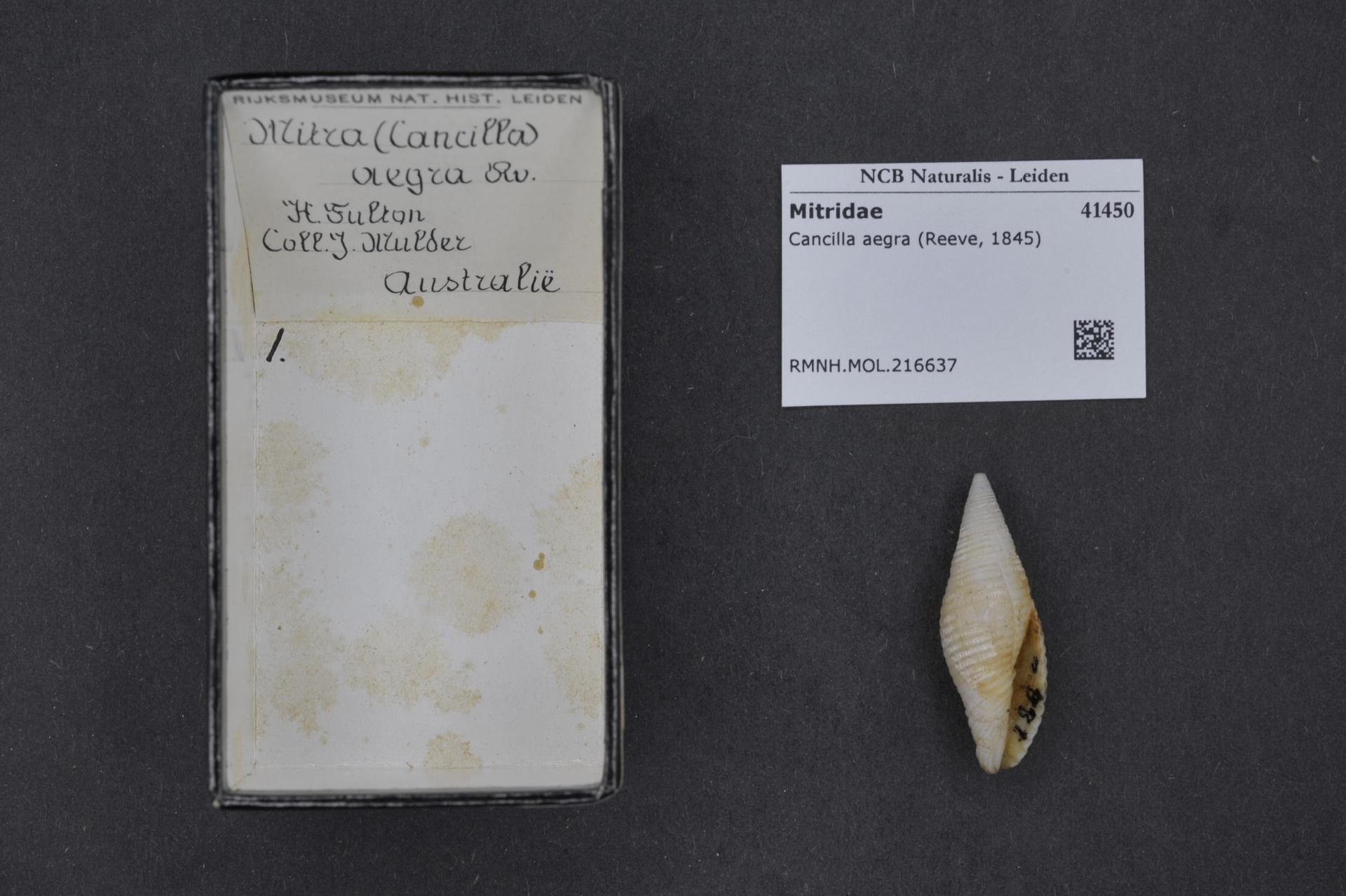

Scientific classification
- Kingdom: Animalia
- Phylum: Mollusca
- Class: Gastropoda
- Subclass: Caenogastropoda
- Order: Neogastropoda
- Family: Mitridae
- Genus: Nebularia
- Species: N. aegra

Binomial name
- Nebularia aegra (Reeve, 1845)

Synonyms
- Cancilla aegra (Reeve, 1845); Mitra aegra Reeve, 1845

= Nebularia aegra =

Species of gastropod

Nebularia aegra is a species of sea snail, a marine gastropod mollusc in the family Mitridae, the miters or miter snails.

== Description ==
Shell size is 40-45 mm.

== Distribution ==
Australia.
