= Nebularia coarctata =

Scientific classification
- Kingdom: Animalia
- Phylum: Mollusca
- Class: Gastropoda
- Subclass: Caenogastropoda
- Order: Neogastropoda
- Family: Mitridae
- Genus: Nebularia
- Species: N. coarctata

Binomial name
- Nebularia coarctata (Reeve, 1844)

Synonyms
- Mitra coarctata Reeve, 1844

Species of gastropod

Nebularia coarctata is a species of sea snail, a marine gastropod mollusc in the family Mitridae, the miters or miter snails.
