= Nebularia bellula =

Scientific classification
- Kingdom: Animalia
- Phylum: Mollusca
- Class: Gastropoda
- Subclass: Caenogastropoda
- Order: Neogastropoda
- Family: Mitridae
- Genus: Nebularia
- Species: N. bellula

Binomial name
- Nebularia bellula A. Adams, 1853

Synonyms
- Mitra bellula A. Adams, 1853

Species of gastropod

Nebularia bellula is a species of sea snail, a marine gastropod mollusc in the family Mitridae, the miters or miter snails.
