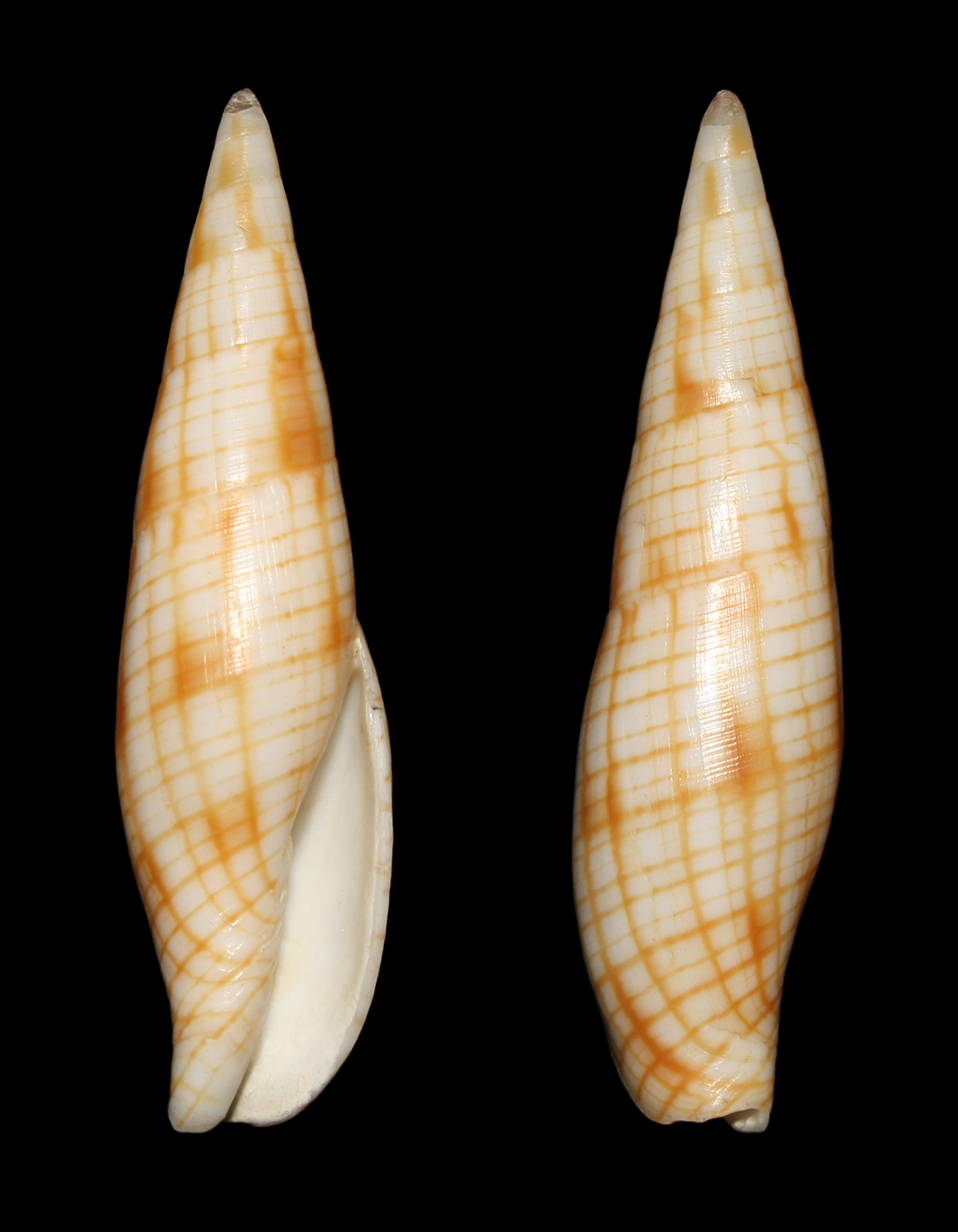

Scientific classification
- Kingdom: Animalia
- Phylum: Mollusca
- Class: Gastropoda
- Subclass: Caenogastropoda
- Order: Neogastropoda
- Family: Mitridae
- Genus: Nebularia
- Species: N. dondani

Binomial name
- Nebularia dondani (Cernohorsky, 1985)

Synonyms
- Mitra dondani Cernohorsky, 1985

= Nebularia dondani =

Species of gastropod

Nebularia dondani is a species of sea snail, a marine gastropod mollusc in the family Mitridae, the miters or miter snails.

== Description ==
This attractively-patterned species attains a size of 45 mm.

== Distribution ==
Uncommon: in deep water off the Philippines.
