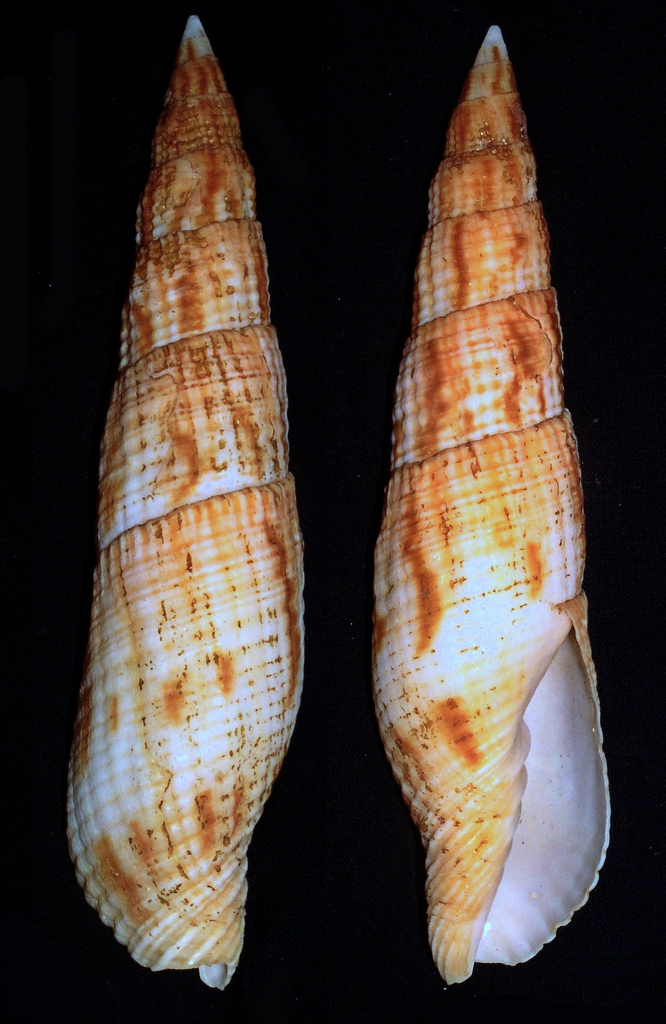

Scientific classification
- Kingdom: Animalia
- Phylum: Mollusca
- Class: Gastropoda
- Subclass: Caenogastropoda
- Order: Neogastropoda
- Family: Mitridae
- Genus: Nebularia
- Species: N. incompta

Binomial name
- Nebularia incompta (Lightfoot, 1786)

Synonyms
- Mitra (Mitra) incompta (Lightfoot, 1786); Mitra incompta (Lightfoot, 1786); Mitra terebralis Lamarck, 1811; Voluta incompta Lightfoot, 1786

= Nebularia incompta =

Species of gastropod

Nebularia incompta (common name: tessellate mitre or auger-like mitre) is a species of large predatory sea snail, a marine gastropod mollusc in the family Mitridae, the miters or miter snails.

== Description ==
The shell size varies between 44 mm and 160 mm

== Distribution ==
This species is distributed in the Red Sea and in the Indian Ocean along Tanzania and the Mascarene Basin; in the Indo-Pacific Region. Coral Sea - Cairns, Queensland, Australia.
