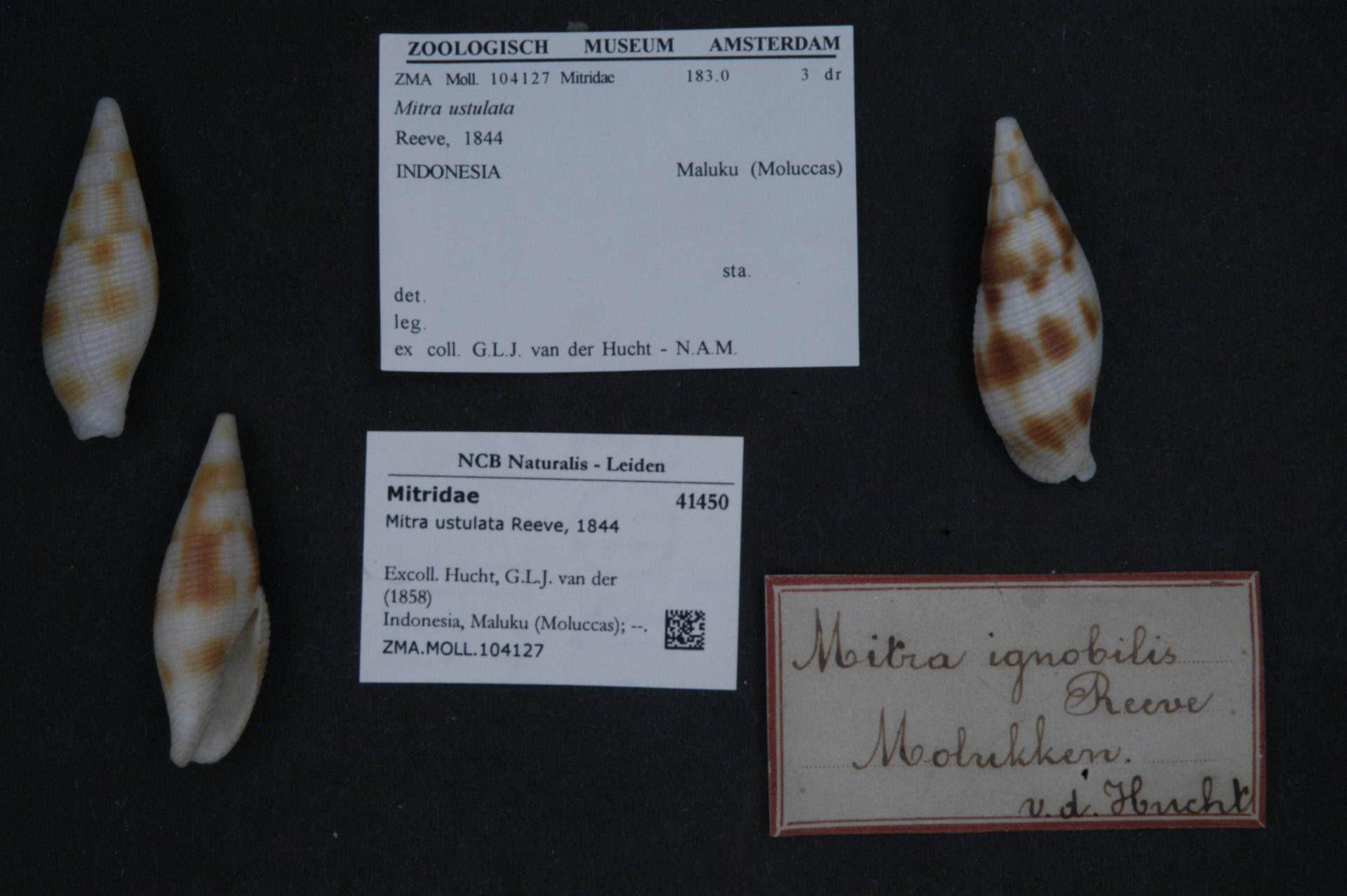

Scientific classification
- Kingdom: Animalia
- Phylum: Mollusca
- Class: Gastropoda
- Subclass: Caenogastropoda
- Order: Neogastropoda
- Family: Mitridae
- Genus: Nebularia
- Species: N. ustulata

Binomial name
- Nebularia ustulata (Reeve, 1844)

Synonyms
- Mitra ustulata Reeve, 1844

= Nebularia ustulata =

Species of gastropod

Nebularia ustulata is a species of sea snail, a marine gastropod mollusc in the family Mitridae, the miters or miter snails.
