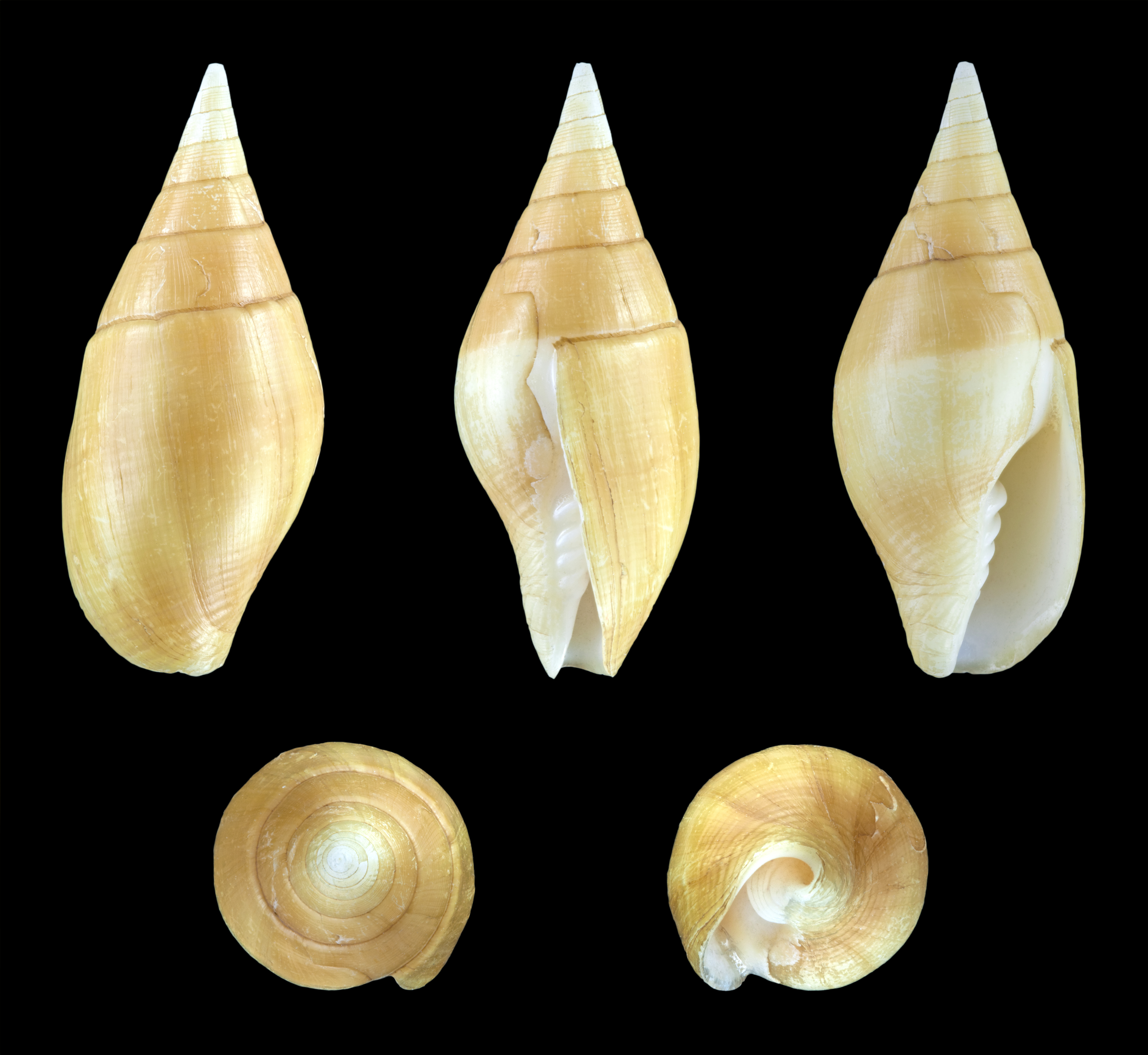

Scientific classification
- Kingdom: Animalia
- Phylum: Mollusca
- Class: Gastropoda
- Subclass: Caenogastropoda
- Order: Neogastropoda
- Family: Mitridae
- Genus: Nebularia
- Species: N. acuminata

Binomial name
- Nebularia acuminata Swainson, 1824

Synonyms
- Mitra (Strigatella) acuminata Swainson, 1824; Mitra acuminata Swainson, 1824; Mutyca acuminata (Swainson, 1824); Strigatella acuminata (Swainson, 1824)

= Nebularia acuminata =

Species of gastropod

Nebularia acuminata (common name: acuminate mitre) is a species of sea snail, a marine gastropod mollusc in the family Mitridae, the miters or miter snails. The shell size varies between 17 mm and 35 mm. This species is distributed in the Indian Ocean (along Aldabra, the Mascarene Basin, Mauritius and Tanzania) and in the Pacific Ocean (along Indonesia, Papua New Guinea, Solomons, Fiji and Australia).
