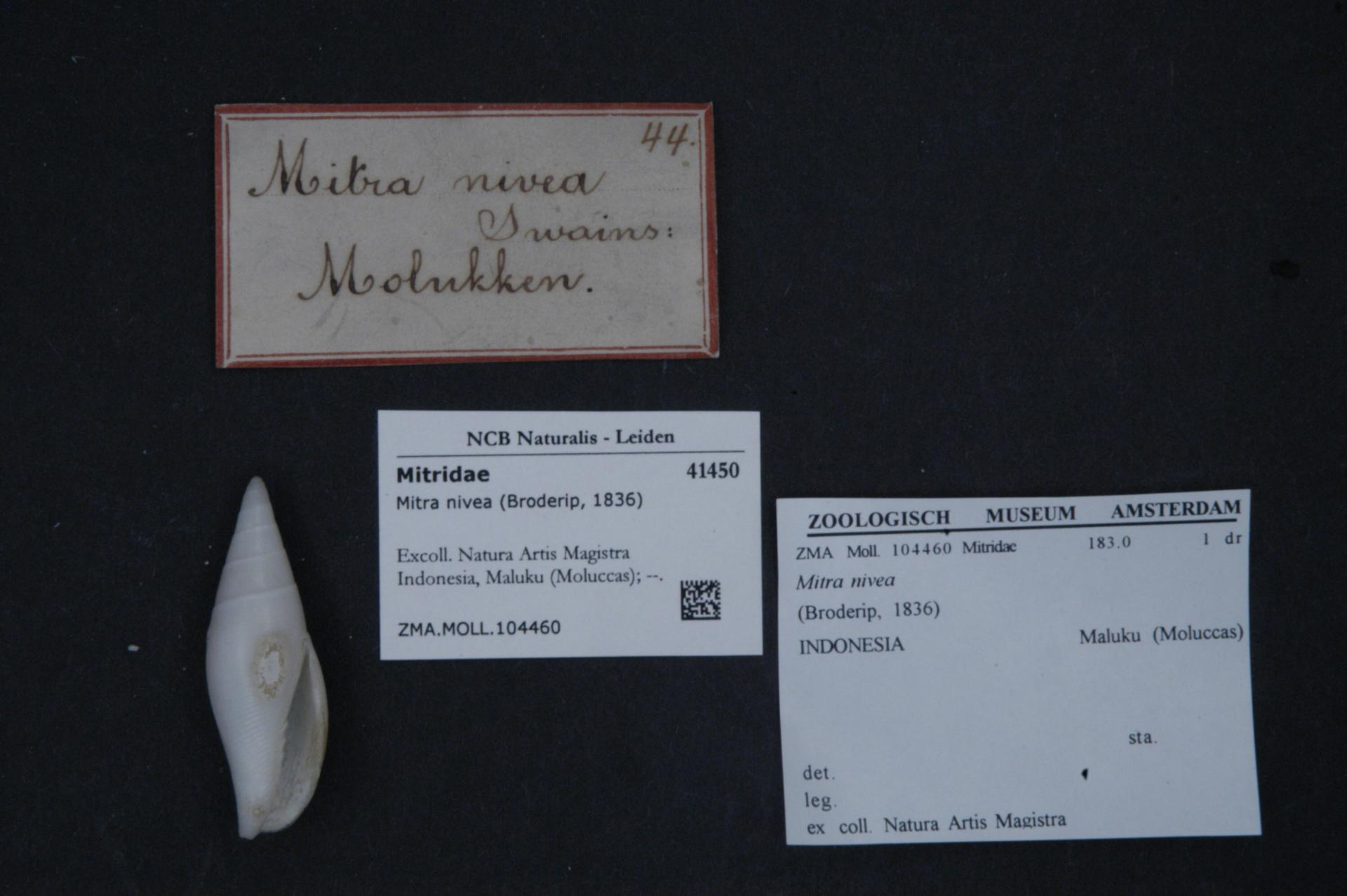

Scientific classification
- Kingdom: Animalia
- Phylum: Mollusca
- Class: Gastropoda
- Subclass: Caenogastropoda
- Order: Neogastropoda
- Family: Mitridae
- Genus: Nebularia
- Species: N. nivea

Binomial name
- Nebularia nivea (Broderip, 1836)

Synonyms
- Mitra nivea (Broderip, 1836); Tiara nivea Broderip, 1836

= Nebularia nivea =

Species of gastropod

Nebularia nivea is a species of sea snail, a marine gastropod mollusc in the family Mitridae, the miters or miter snails.
