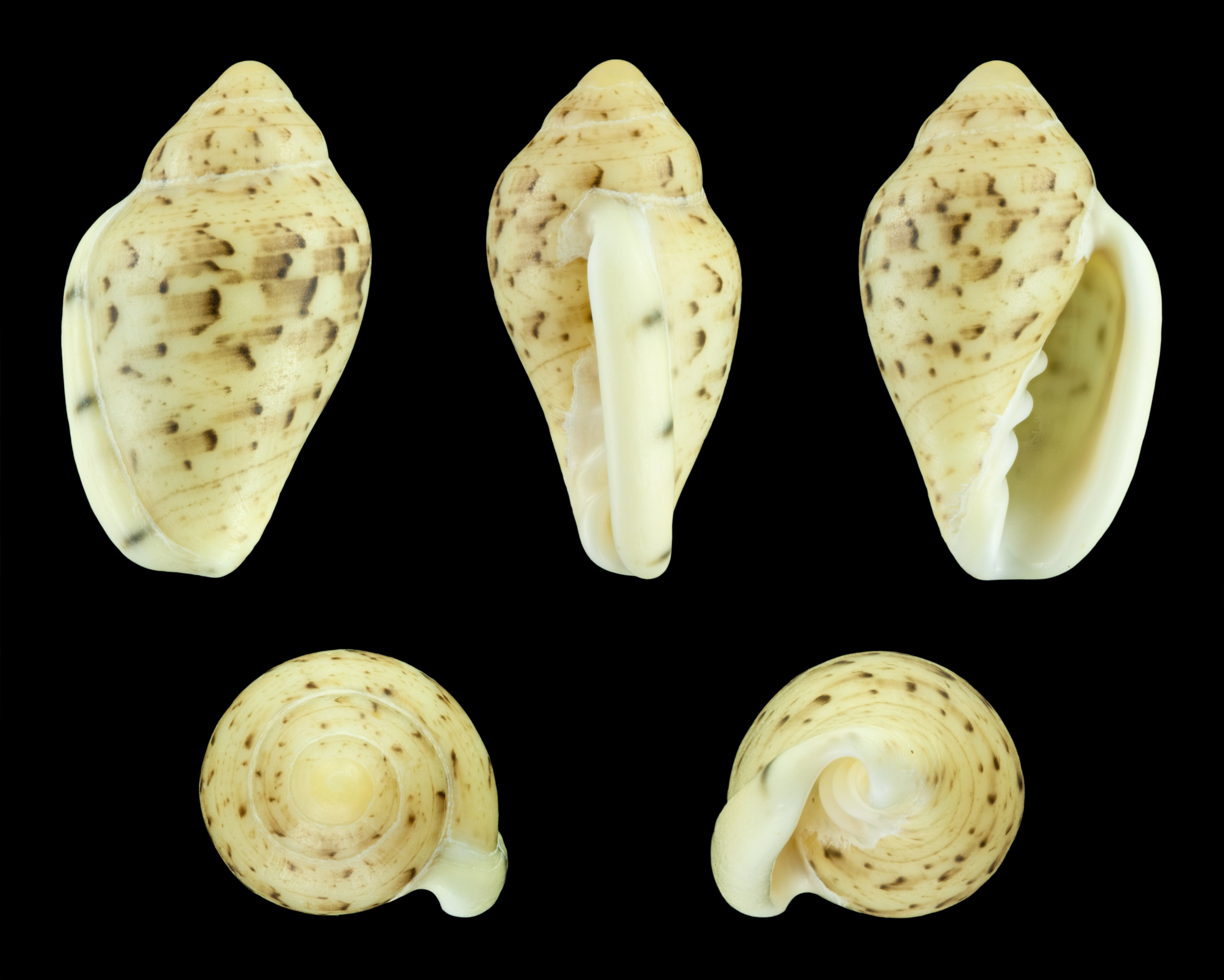

Scientific classification
- Kingdom: Animalia
- Phylum: Mollusca
- Class: Gastropoda
- Subclass: Caenogastropoda
- Order: Neogastropoda
- Family: Marginellidae
- Genus: Marginella
- Species: M. lutea

Binomial name
- Marginella lutea G. B. Sowerby III, 1889

Synonyms
- Marginella piperata var. lutea G.B. Sowerby III, 1889

= Marginella lutea =

Species of gastropod

Marginella lutea is a species of sea snail, a marine gastropod mollusk in the family Marginellidae, the margin snails.
