= Mangelia lutea =

Scientific classification
- Kingdom: Animalia
- Phylum: Mollusca
- Class: Gastropoda
- Subclass: Caenogastropoda
- Order: Neogastropoda
- Superfamily: Conoidea
- Family: Mangeliidae
- Genus: Mangelia
- Species: M. lutea

Binomial name
- Mangelia lutea A.A. Gould, 1860

Synonyms
- Mangilia lutea A.A. Gould, 1860

Species of gastropod

Mangelia lutea is a species of sea snail, a marine gastropod mollusk in the family Mangeliidae.

== Description ==
The length of the shell attains 5 mm, its diameter 2 mm.

== Distribution ==
This marine species occurs off the Ryukyus, Japan.
