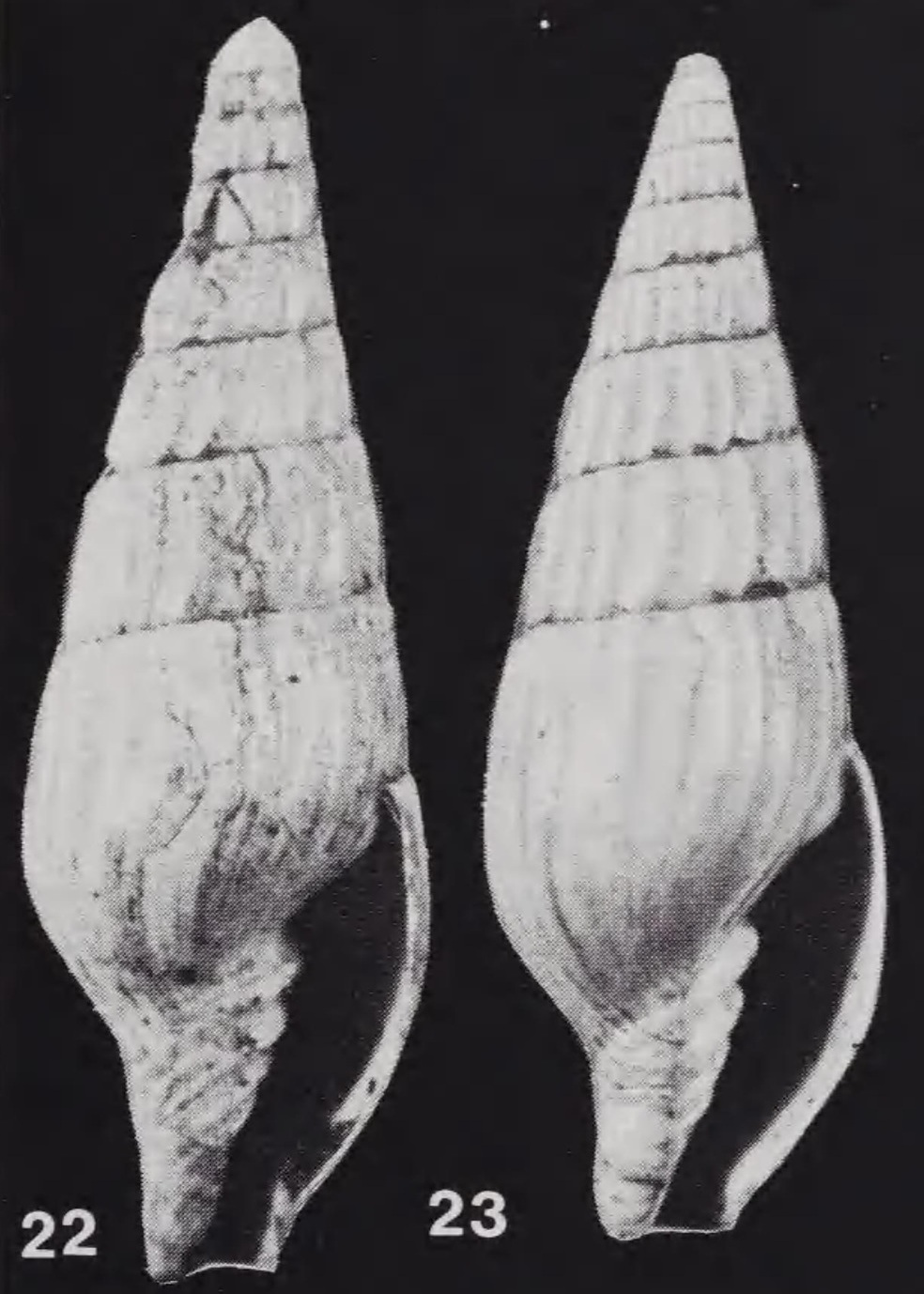
- Holotype and paratype from the South Australian Museum

Scientific classification
- Kingdom: Animalia
- Phylum: Mollusca
- Class: Gastropoda
- Subclass: Caenogastropoda
- Order: Neogastropoda
- Superfamily: Turbinelloidea
- Family: Costellariidae
- Genus: Tosapusia
- Species: T. kalimnanensis

Binomial name
- Tosapusia kalimnanensis (Cernohorsky, 1970)

Synonyms
- † Balcomitra terebraeformis (Tate), Darragh (invalid (homonym)); † Mitra terebraeformis Tate, 1889 (invalid (homonym)); † Uromitra terebriformis Tate, Harris, 1897 (invalid (homonym)); † Vexillum (Costellaria) kalimnanense Cernohorsky, 1970; † Vexillum kalimnanense Cernohorsky, 1970

= Tosapusia kalimnanensis =

Extinct species of gastropod

Tosapusia kalimnanensis is an extinct species of sea snail, a marine gastropod mollusk, in the family Costellariidae, the ribbed miters. The species is known from Pliocene fossil formations in Victoria, Australia.

== Description ==
Cernohorsky described the species as below:

Shell up to 20.0 mm (0.79 in) in length, somewhat terebriform in shape, last whorl slightly inflated, smooth and shining, teleoconch of 7 almost flat-sided whorls, protoconch of 1½-1¾ smooth embryonic whorls. Sutures distinct and indented by a narrow, ill-defined subsutural band, whorls sculptured with slender, angulate and slightly curved axial ribs, interspaces smooth, base of body whorl constricted, siphonal fasciole with a few oblique cords. Aperture shorter than the spire, outer lip convex but constricted basally, columella with 4 oblique folds, siphonal canal straight.

The species' shell is visually similar to T. turriformis, but can be distinguished due to T. kalimnanensis having narrower axial elements, and due to T. turriformis having a whorl periphery shifted abapically.

== Taxonomy ==
The species was first described as Mitra terebraeformis in 1889 by Ralph Tate. In 1970, Walter Oliver Cernohorsky gave the species the provisional name Vexillum (Costellaria) kalimnanense, after finding that the name given by Reeve was invalid name due to a different species being described using this name in 1848 by Timothy Abbott Conrad. In 2017, the species was recombined as a part of the genus Tosapusia, and given the name Tosapusia kalimnanensis.

== Distribution ==
Fossils of this marine species date to the early Pliocene, and have been found in the Grange Burn Formation of the Otway Basin and the upper beds of the Muddy Creek Formation in Victoria, Australia.
