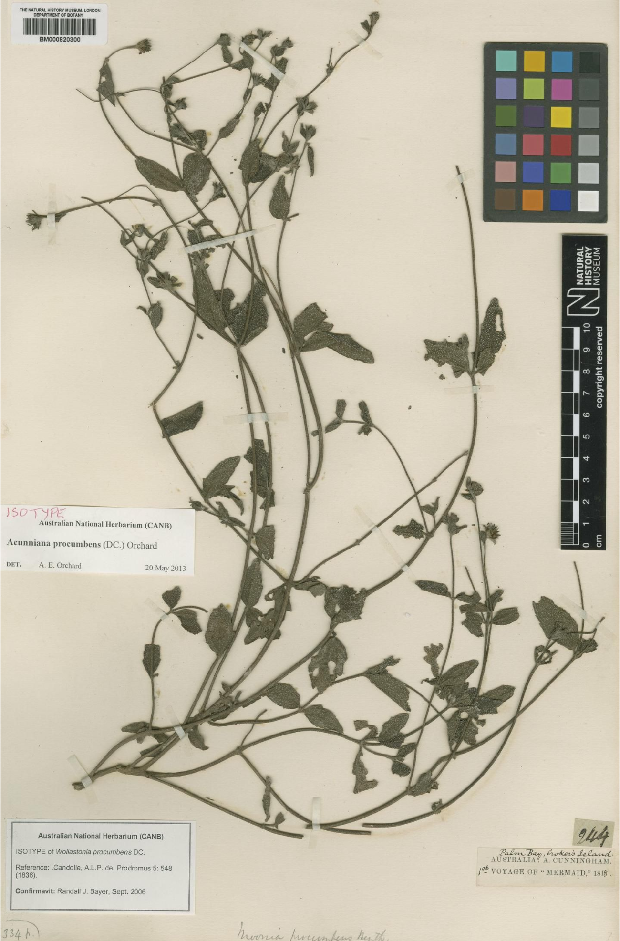

Scientific classification
- Kingdom: Plantae
- Clade: Tracheophytes
- Clade: Angiosperms
- Clade: Eudicots
- Clade: Asterids
- Order: Asterales
- Family: Asteraceae
- Subfamily: Asteroideae
- Tribe: Heliantheae
- Subtribe: Ecliptinae
- Genus: Acunniana; Orchard
- Species: A. procumbens

Binomial name
- Acunniana procumbens (DC.) Orchard

Synonyms
- Chrysogonum procumbens (DC.) F.Muell.; Microchaeta procumbens Nutt.; Moonia procumbens Benth.; Seruneum procumbens Kuntze; Wollastonia insularis DC.; Wollastonia procumbens DC.

= Acunniana =

Genus of flowering plants

Acunniana is a monospecific genus in the family Asteraceae which is found only in Australia's Northern Territory. In the wild, Acunniana procumbens closely resembles species of the genera Indocypraea and Apowollastonia. The genus is named for its discoverer, Allan Cunningham, whose name abbreviates to A.Cunn.

== Description ==
Acunniana procumbens is a perennial herb which grows 0.3–1.0 m tall. It has opposite leaves which are simple and 25–55 mm long, 10–35 mm wide. It has 2 series of bracts; the outer bracts are green, herbaceous, and exceeding the inner bracts and disc florets; the inner bracts green and all the bracts are abaxially hairy. Ray florets are pistillate and fertile while the corollas are yellow. The disc florets functionally staminate and don't form achenes. The paleae are lanceolate, conduplicate, stiff, coriaceous, opaque, green in flower, becoming stramineous, and lack an abaxial crest. The midrib is apparent plus several striae with its tip slightly expanded or slightly lobed, and abaxially shortly scabrous. Its achenes are only developed from ray florets, and are brown to grey in color and 4.0–4.5 mm long. They are slightly compressed, 3-angled, ovoid, rounded apically, with sparse, minute hairs apically.
