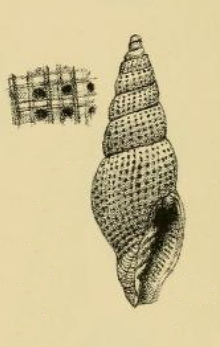
- Shell of Vexillum escharoides (holotype)

Scientific classification
- Kingdom: Animalia
- Phylum: Mollusca
- Class: Gastropoda
- Subclass: Caenogastropoda
- Order: Neogastropoda
- Superfamily: Turbinelloidea
- Family: Costellariidae
- Genus: Vexillum
- Species: †V. escharoides

Binomial name
- †Vexillum escharoides (Tate, 1889)

Synonyms
- † Mitra escharoides Tate, 1889

= Vexillum escharoides =

Species of gastropod

Vexillum escharoides is an extinct species of sea snail, a marine gastropod mollusk, in the family Costellariidae, the ribbed miters.

== Description ==
The length of the shell attains 17 mm; its diameter 5 mm; the length of the aperture is 8mm.

(Original description) The shell is stout, narrow-fusiform, ending in a sub-cylindric protoconch of two smooth whorls. The shell contains six whorls, excluding the protoconch, slightly convex. They are sculptured with broad, flat, transverse ribs, and by narrower spiral ones, which include between them large, roundly oblong depressions. There are eight rows of punctures on the penultimate whorl. The body whorl is a little sloping to the suture, but slightly attenuated to the bent and reverted short beak. The aperture is narrow, oval-oblong, with a spiral callosity at the posterior angle. The outer lip is thin, slightly ecurved medially, stoutly lirate within. The columella has four thick approximate plaits, increasing in size from the front.

== Distribution ==
Fossils of this marine species were found in older Tertiary strata in Victoria, Australia.
