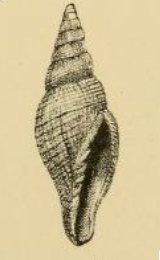
- Shell of † Vexillum atractoides (holotype)

Scientific classification
- Kingdom: Animalia
- Phylum: Mollusca
- Class: Gastropoda
- Subclass: Caenogastropoda
- Order: Neogastropoda
- Superfamily: Turbinelloidea
- Family: Costellariidae
- Genus: Vexillum
- Species: †V. atractoides

Binomial name
- †Vexillum atractoides (Tate, 1889)

Synonyms
- † Mitra atractoides Tate, 1889

= Vexillum atractoides =

Species of gastropod

Vexillum atractoides is an extinct species of sea snail, a marine gastropod mollusk, in the family Costellariidae, the ribbed miters.

== Description ==
The length of the shell attains 21 mm, its diameter 7 mm.

(Original description) The narrowly fusiform-biconic shell has a moderately elevated spire, ending in a blunt conoidal protoconch of four smooth whorls. The shell contains five whorls, excluding the protoconch. They are slightly convex, with a linear suture, sculptured with raised spiral threads and tessellated by curved transverse threads. The Body whorl shows a cancellate ornament, a little ventricose in front of suture, medially attenuated, but slightly dilated at the front. The aperture is very narrow. The outer lip is thin, smooth within, medially ecurved. The columella is nearly straight, with four plaits, the anterior one small.

== Distribution ==
Fossils of this marine species were found in older Tertiary strata in Australia.
