= Odostomia deplexa =

Scientific classification
- Kingdom: Animalia
- Phylum: Mollusca
- Class: Gastropoda
- Family: Pyramidellidae
- Genus: Odostomia
- Species: O. deplexa

Binomial name
- Odostomia deplexa (Tate & May, 1900)

Synonyms
- Odontostomia deplexa Tate, R. & May, W.L. 1900

Species of gastropod

Odostomia deplexa, common name the unwoven pyramid-shell, is a species of sea snail, a marine gastropod mollusc in the family Pyramidellidae, the pyrams and their allies.

== Description ==
The length of the shell measures 3 mm.

== Distribution ==
This endemic species occurs in the littoral zone and offshore off Tasmania, and southern and southwestern Australia
