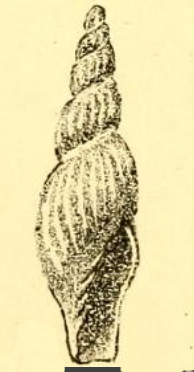
- Drawing of a shell of Vexillum pellucidum (holotype)

Scientific classification
- Kingdom: Animalia
- Phylum: Mollusca
- Class: Gastropoda
- Subclass: Caenogastropoda
- Order: Neogastropoda
- Superfamily: Turbinelloidea
- Family: Costellariidae
- Genus: Vexillum
- Species: V. pellucidum

Binomial name
- Vexillum pellucidum (Tate, 1887)

Synonyms
- Austromitra pellucida (R. Tate, 1887); Mitra pellucida Tate, 1887; Vexillum (Costellaria) pellucidum (Tate, 1887)

= Vexillum pellucidum =

Species of gastropod

Vexillum pellucidum is a species of sea snail, a marine gastropod mollusk, in the family Costellariidae, the ribbed miters.

== Description ==
The length of the shell attains 7 mm.

(Original description) The minute shell is slender, fusiform, translucent, colourless and polished. The protoconch is obtuse. The shell contains six whorls, flatly convex with a distinct suture. The two or three apical whorls are smooth, the rest show thick depressed axial ribs. The interstices are linear and puncturated. The body whorl is lirate at the base. The anterior portion of the columella is slightly recurved. The columella has three strong oblique plaits. The outer lip is not thickened and is smooth within.

== Distribution ==
This marine species is endemic to Australia and occurs off South Australia, Victoria, Western Australia.
