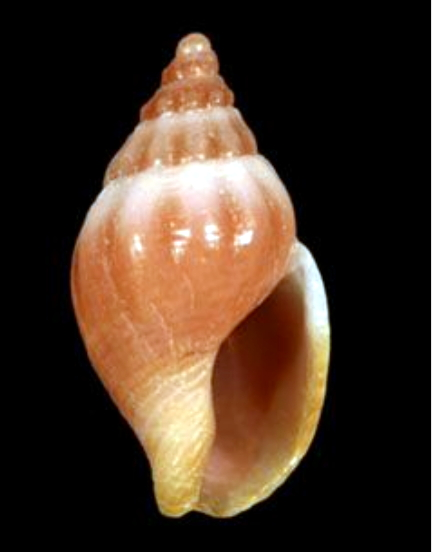
- Shell of Anachis cominellaeformis (specimen at the Natural History Museum Rotterdam)

Scientific classification
- Kingdom: Animalia
- Phylum: Mollusca
- Class: Gastropoda
- Subclass: Caenogastropoda
- Order: Neogastropoda
- Family: Columbellidae
- Genus: Anachis
- Species: A. cominellaeformis

Binomial name
- Anachis cominellaeformis (Tate, 1892)

Synonyms
- Columbella cominellaeformis Tate, 1892 (original combination)

= Anachis cominellaeformis =

Species of gastropod

Anachis cominellaeformis is a species of sea snail in the family Columbellidae, the dove snails.

== Description ==
The length of the shell attains 10 mm, its diameter 4.25 mm.

(Original description) The shell is elongately oval, moderately solid, and shining, appearing unicolorous (pellucid-white, rose, or purplish-brown). The apex is somewhat apiculate. The protoconch is semi-cylindrical, consisting of two smooth whorls, with the first being very small and the second narrow and elongate. The four spire-whorls are strongly nodulose-plicate (nine or ten on the penultimate), spirally distantly linear-sulcate, and striated transversely. The two posterior whorls are slightly angled..

The body whorl has about two plications in its posterior part, which become evanescent in alignment with the hinder angle of the aperture. The rest of the surface is without ornament, but is sculptured with striae of growth and incised spiral lines. The latter pass into sulci, separating depressed narrow ridges on the base.

The aperture is narrowly subquadrate. The siphonal canal is short and everted. The outer lip has a blunt edge. The medial part of the body whorl behind the aperture is slightly compressed, and there is a slight tabulation at the suture, which produces a slight insinuation at the posterior angle of the aperture.

== Distribution ==
This species is endemic to Australia and occurs off Victoria and South Australia.
