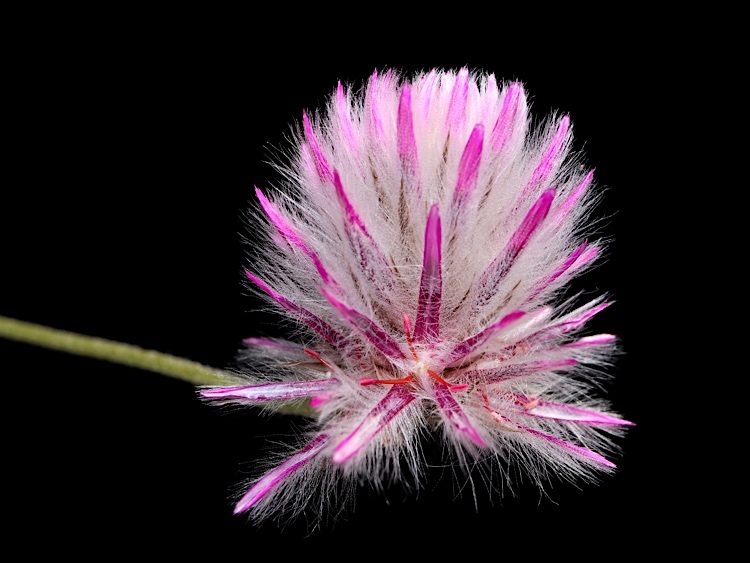

Scientific classification
- Kingdom: Plantae
- Clade: Tracheophytes
- Clade: Angiosperms
- Clade: Eudicots
- Order: Caryophyllales
- Family: Amaranthaceae
- Genus: Ptilotus
- Species: P. indivisus

Binomial name
- Ptilotus indivisus Benl

Synonyms
- Ptilotus gomphrenoides (Moq.) F.Muell. nom. illeg.; Ptilotus gomphrenoides (Moq.) Tate nom. illeg.; Trichinium gomphrenoides Moq.

= Ptilotus indivisus =

Species of herb

Ptilotus humilis, commonly known as tangled silver-tails, is a species of flowering plant in the family Amaranthaceae and is endemic to the New South Wales, Australia. It is a straggly perennial herb with lance-shaped leaves and cylindrical spikes of whitish grey flowers with a faint, purplish tinge.

== Description ==
Ptilotus humilis is a straggly perennial herb, that typically grows to a height of 40 cm (16 in) and has intertwined branches. Its leaves are lance-shaped, mostly 15–25 mm (0.59–0.98 in) long and 3–4 mm (0.12–0.16 in) wide. The flowers are arranged in cylindrical spikes 25 mm (0.98 in) long and 15 mm (0.59 in) in diameter and whitish grey with a purplish tinge and with hairy, egg-shaped bracts. The perianth segments are 10–12 mm (0.39–0.47 in) long with a purplish tinge. There are five stamens and the ovary is glabrous.

== Taxonomy ==
Ptilotus indivisus was first formally described in 1959 by Gerard Benl in Mitteilungen der Botanischen Staatssammlung Munchen from specimens collected on the south coast of New Holland by James Drummond.

== Distribution ==
Ptilotus humilis is known from only four specimens, all from the Mudgee and Parkes districts.

== See also ==
- List of Ptilotus species
