= George Tate (topographer) =

English topographer, antiquarian and naturalist (1805-1871)

George Tate, F.G.S.
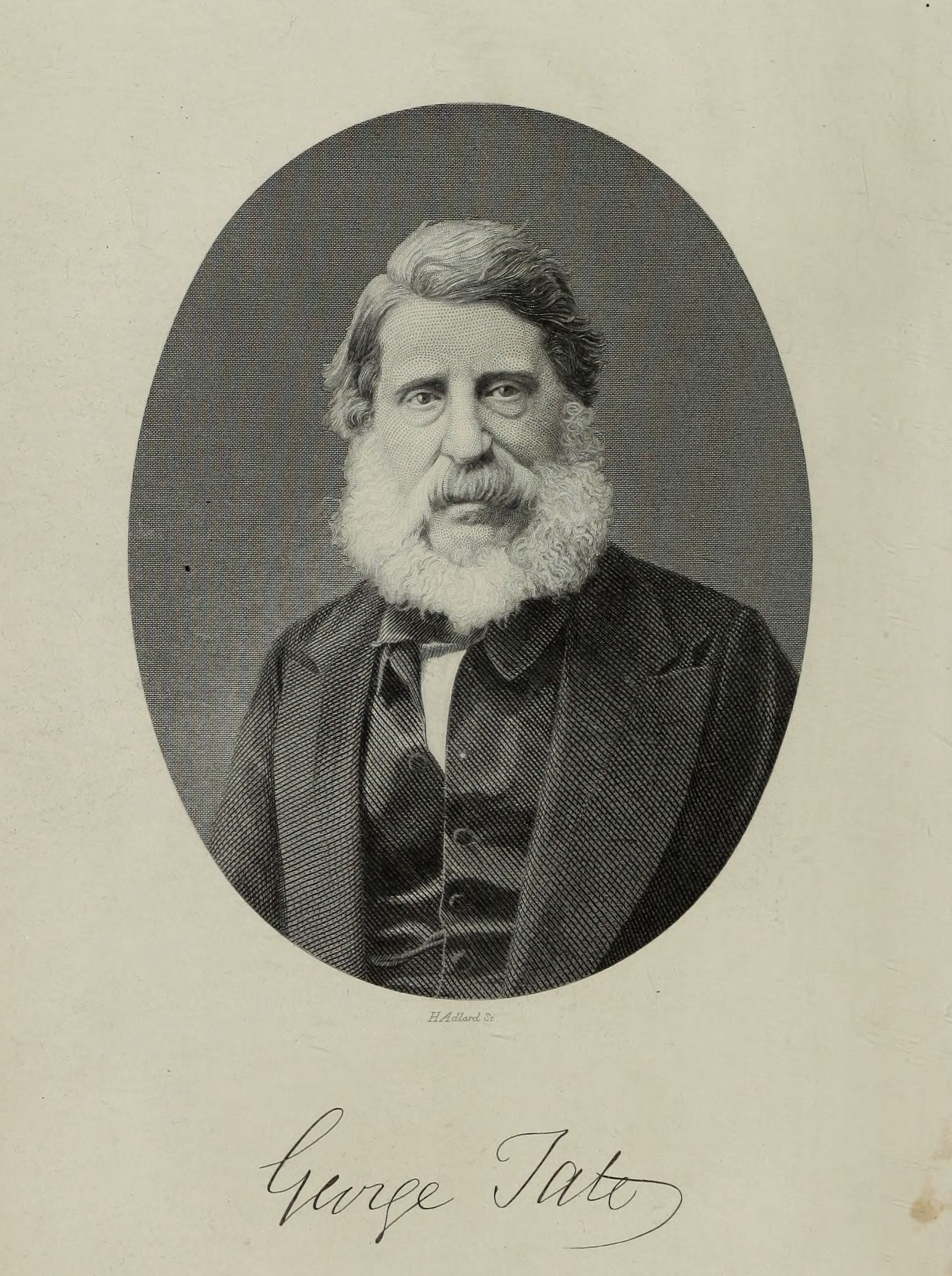
- Born: 21 May 1805; Alnwick
- Died: 7 June 1871 (aged 66); Alnwick
- Occupations: Draper; Postmaster; Naturalist; Antiquarian
- Notable work: History of Alnwick
- Relatives: Thomas Tate (brother); Ralph Tate (nephew)

George Tate (21 May 1805 – 7 June 1871) was an English tradesman from Northumberland, known as a local topographer, antiquarian and naturalist. His major work was a history of his native town, Alnwick.

== Life ==
He was son of Ralph Tate, a builder, and the brother of Thomas Tate, the mathematician and chemist. His life was passed in Alnwick, of which he was a freeman by right of birth. There, in his earlier years, he carried on the business of a linendraper. In 1848 he was appointed postmaster, and held the office till within two weeks of his death. He was active in the public life the town, helping to organise the Alnwick Mechanics' Scientific Institution, of which he acted as secretary for thirty years, and as the secretary of the Berwickshire Naturalists' Club from 1858 until his death.

Tate died on 7 June 1871, and was buried on the 9th in Alnwick churchyard, on the south side of the church. He was a Fellow of the Geological Society, and honoured by other learned societies.

== Works ==
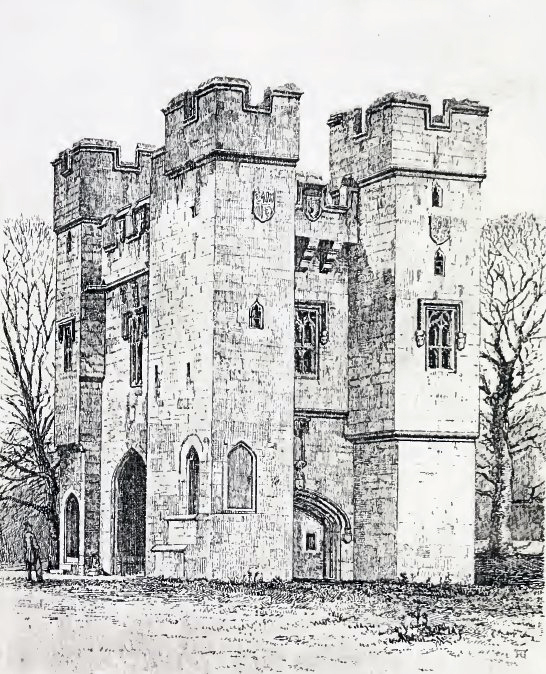
Alnwick Abbey gatehouse, illustration from George Tate's The History of the Borough, Castle, and Barony of Alnwick (1869)

Tate's History of the Borough, Castle, and Barony of Alnwick, which appeared in parts between 1865 and 1869, was his major publication. It included the history of Alnwick Castle and the Percy family, with accounts of old customs, sports, public movements, local nomenclature, the botany, zoology, and geology of the district, and biographies of the notabilities of the town. On the completion of its publication a banquet was given in Tate's honour in the town-hall, 21 May 1869.

Tate also published in 1865 Sculptured Rocks of Northumberland and Eastern Borders. He examined ancient British remains, and wrote papers on them for the proceedings of the Berwickshire Naturalists' Club. Besides monographs on the Farne Islands, Dunstanburgh Castle, Long Houghton church, and Harbottle Castle, he prepared accounts of the Cheviot Hills, St. Cuthbert's beads, porpoises, the bulk and colour of the hair and eyes of the Northumbrians, the orange-legged hobby, and the common squirrel.

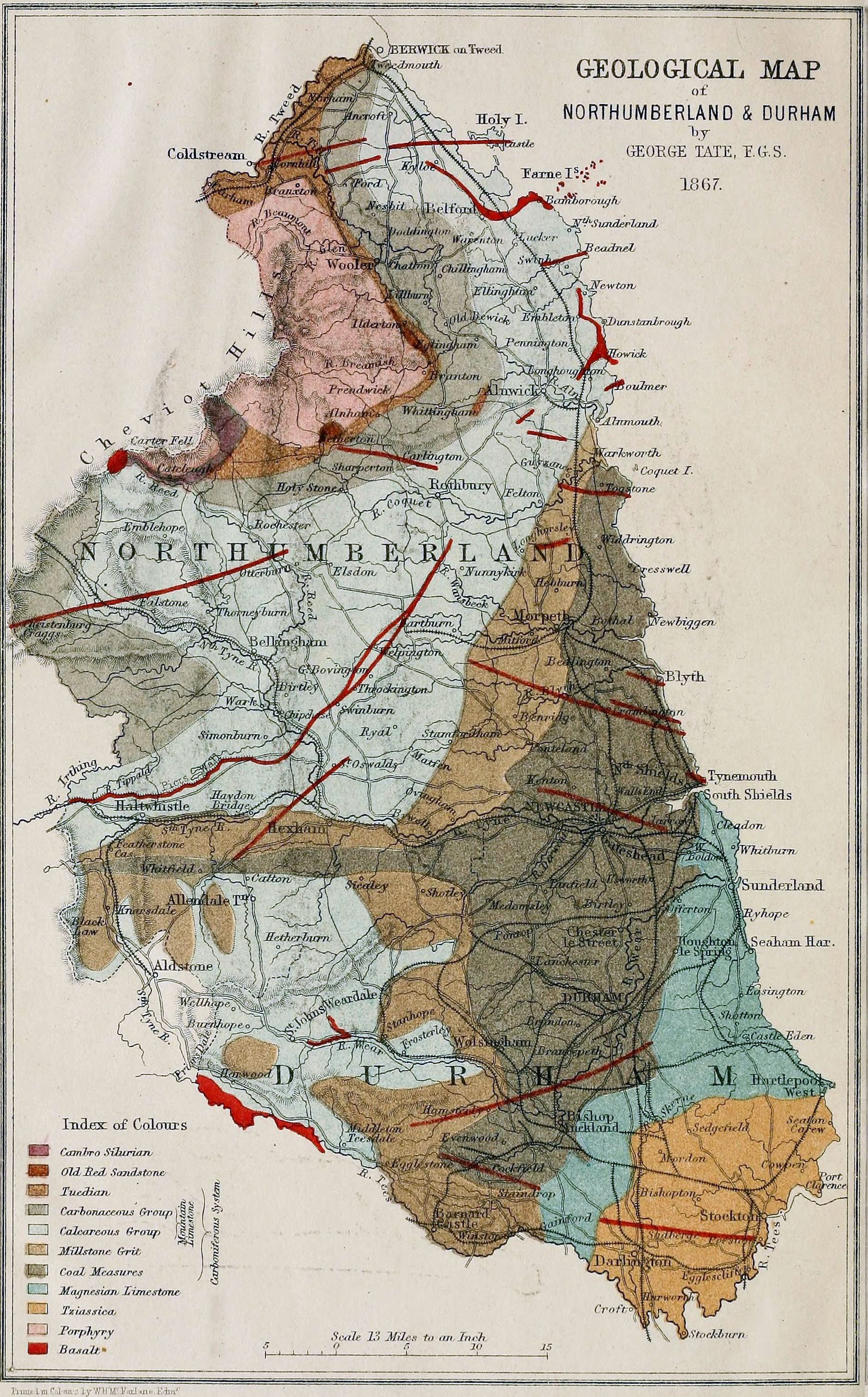
Tate's Geological map of Northumberland and Durham

Tate's account of his journey along the Roman Roman wall, with his examination of its geology, was published as a part of John Collingwood Bruce's The Roman Wall (2nd edit. 1853). His account of the fossil flora of Berwickshire, North Durham, and the adjacent parts of Northumberland and Roxburghshire was incorporated in George Johnston's work, The Natural History of the Eastern Borders, 1854; and that of the geology of Northumberland in John Gilbert Baker and George Ralph Tate's New Flora of Northumberland and Durham. He was the first to record marks of ice action on rocks in Northumberland. Robert Middleman gives a list of Tate's publications in his obituary notice.

Tate formed a museum, rich in fossils collected in the course of his investigations in the carboniferous and mountain limestone formations. His name was given to three species by Thomas Rupert Jones: Estheria striata var. Tateana, Candona tateana, and Beyrichia tatei (Bernix tatei).

== Family ==
Tate married, in 1832, Ann Horsley, also of Alnwick, who died on 21 December 1847. Two sons and three daughters survived him.

== Notes ==
Attribution

This article incorporates text from a publication now in the public domain: Lee, Sidney, ed. (1898). "Tate, George (1805-1871)". Dictionary of National Biography. Vol. 55. London: Smith, Elder & Co.
