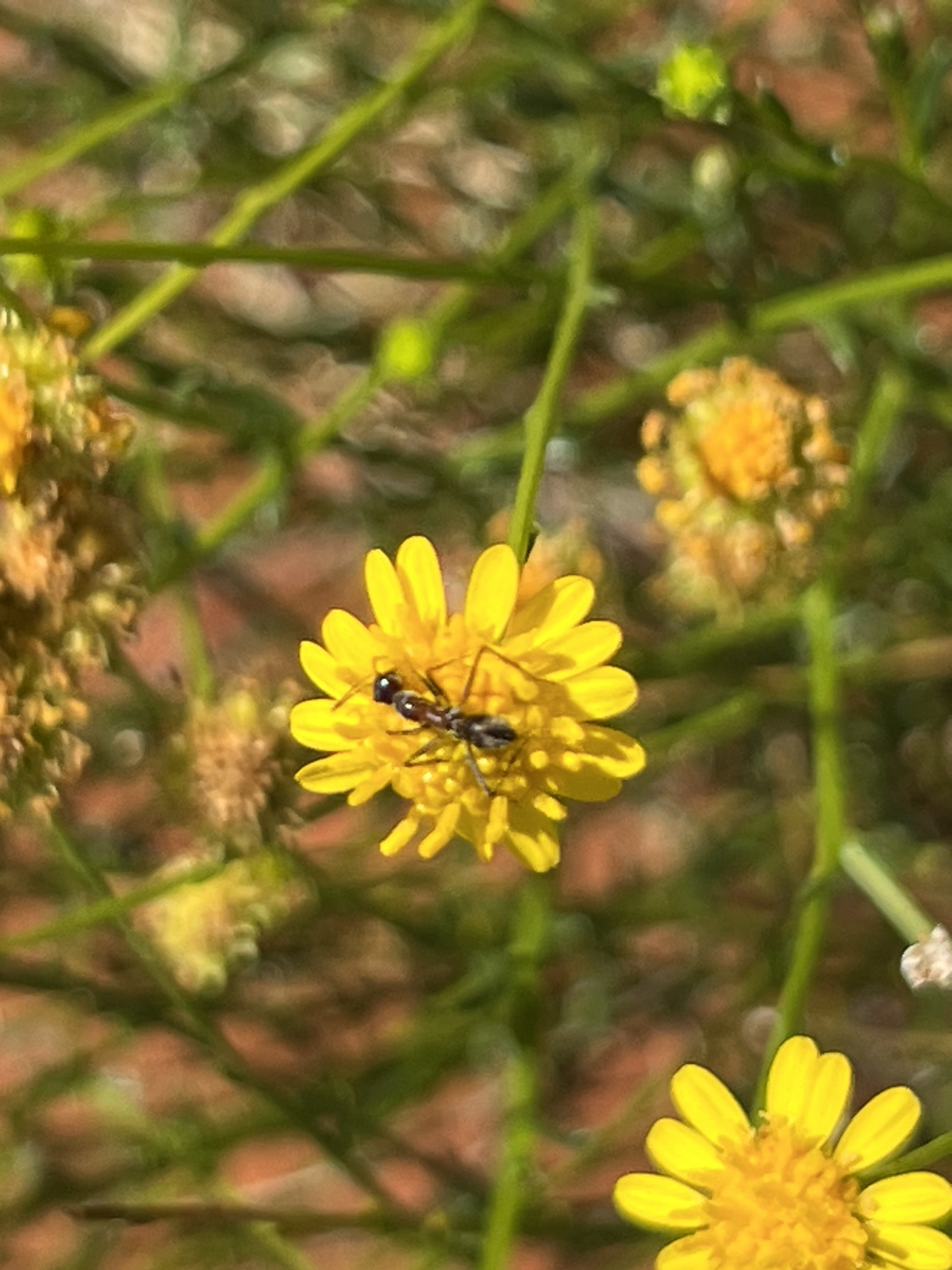

Scientific classification
- Kingdom: Plantae
- Clade: Embryophytes
- Clade: Tracheophytes
- Clade: Spermatophytes
- Clade: Angiosperms
- Clade: Eudicots
- Clade: Asterids
- Order: Asterales
- Family: Asteraceae
- Tribe: Heliantheae
- Genus: Apowollastonia
- Species: A. stirlingii

Binomial name
- Apowollastonia stirlingii (Tate) Orchard

= Apowollastonia stirlingii =

Sunflower daisy

Species of plant

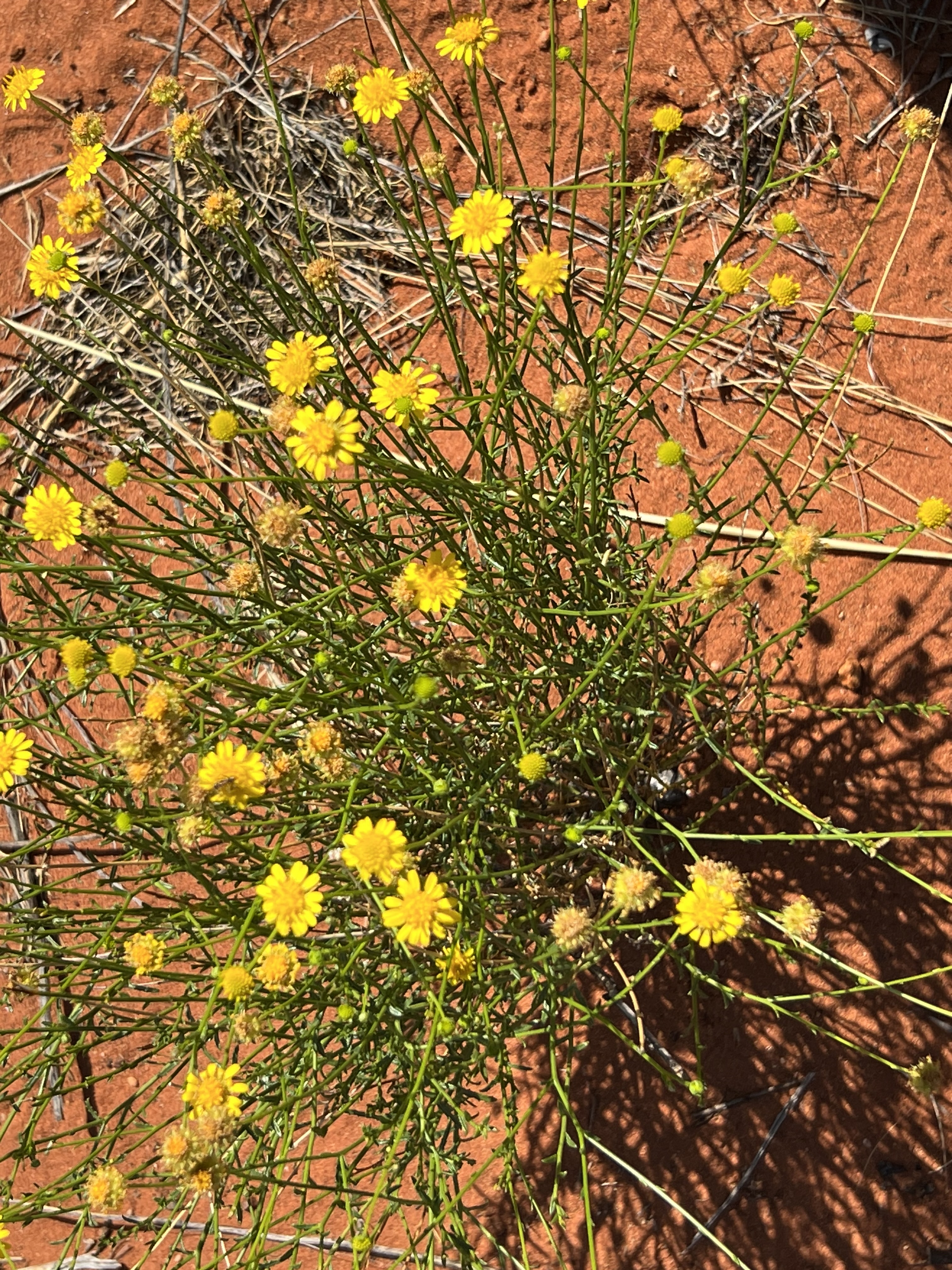
Habit

Apowollastonia stirlingii is a flowering plant in the family Asteraceae and is endemic to Australia. It is a small, upright herb with yellow daisy-like flowers.

== Description ==
Apowollastonia stirlingii is a small herb or understory shrub up to 80 cm (31 in) high, 2 m (6 ft 7 in) in diameter and upright stems with more or less corky bark. The green branches rough with hard protrusions, ridged and lower parts woody. The leaves are arranged in sparse pairs, sessile, linear or linear-lance shaped, gradually narrowing at the base, 2–5 cm (0.79–1.97 in) long, 4–15 mm (0.16–0.59 in) wide, stiff, 1-3 sharp teeth on the margins, rough with warty-based hairs. The yellow flower petals are oblanceolate-shaped, 8–10 mm (0.31–0.39 in) long, notched at the apex, disc florets about 50-100, bracts oval-shaped, 4–5 mm (0.16–0.20 in) long, peduncle rough and 3–16 cm (1.2–6.3 in) long. Flowering occurs from July to September and the fruit is dry, one seeded, wedge-shaped, brown, flattened, 3–4 mm (0.12–0.16 in) long with 2 or 3 narrow, dry wings.

== Taxonomy and naming ==
The species was first described by Ralph Tate as Wedelia stirlingii. In 2013 Anthony Edward Orchard changed the name to Apowollastonia stirlingii and the description was published in the journal Nuytsia. The specific epithet (stirlingii) was named in honour of Edward Charles Stirling.

== Distribution and habitat ==
Apowollastonia stirlingii grows on grassy woodlands, gullies and rocky locations in South Australia, Western Australia and the Northern Territory.
