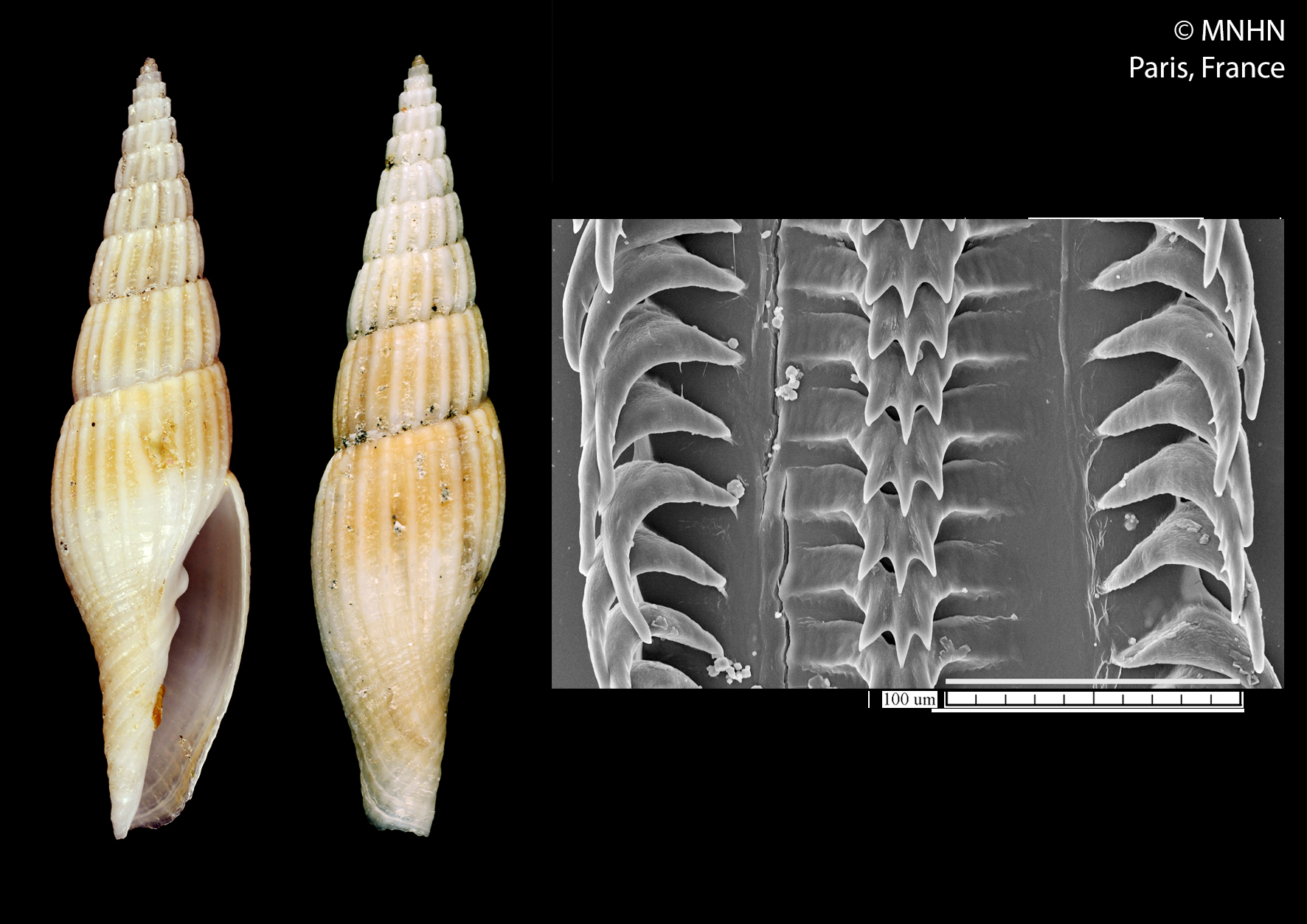
- Shell and radula of Tosapusia bismarckeana (holotype at MNHN, Paris)

Scientific classification
- Kingdom: Animalia
- Phylum: Mollusca
- Class: Gastropoda
- Subclass: Caenogastropoda
- Order: Neogastropoda
- Superfamily: Turbinelloidea
- Family: Costellariidae
- Genus: Tosapusia
- Species: T. bismarckeana

Binomial name
- Tosapusia bismarckeana Fedosov, Herrmann & Bouchet, 2017

= Tosapusia bismarckeana =

Species of gastropod

Tosapusia bismarckeana is a species of sea snail, a marine gastropod mollusk, in the family Costellariidae, the ribbed miters.

== Holotype ==
The holotype of the species (MNHN IM-2013-19695), measured 35.1 mm.

Type Locality : Papua New Guinea, Bismarck Sea, off Bagabag Island, PAPUA NIUGINI, station CP3979.

== Distribution ==
This species occurs in the following locations:

- Papua New Guinea (Bismarck Sea and Solomon Sea)
- Solomon Islands
- East China Sea
