= Tosapusia neudorfensis =

Scientific classification
- Kingdom: Animalia
- Phylum: Mollusca
- Class: Gastropoda
- Subclass: Caenogastropoda
- Order: Neogastropoda
- Superfamily: Turbinelloidea
- Family: Costellariidae
- Genus: Tosapusia
- Species: †T. neudorfensis

Binomial name
- †Tosapusia neudorfensis Tosapusia neudorfensis

Synonyms
- † Mitra neudorfensis Schaffer, 1898 superseded combination; † Vexillum svagrovskyi Biskupič, 2020 junior subjective synonym

Species of gastropod

Tosapusia neudorfensis is an extinct species of sea snail, a marine gastropod mollusk, in the family Costellariidae, the ribbed miters.

== Description ==
The length of the shell attains 29.2 mm, its diameter 9.6 mm.

== Distribution ==
Fossils of this marine species were found in middle Miocene strata of the Vienna Basin (Slovakia).
