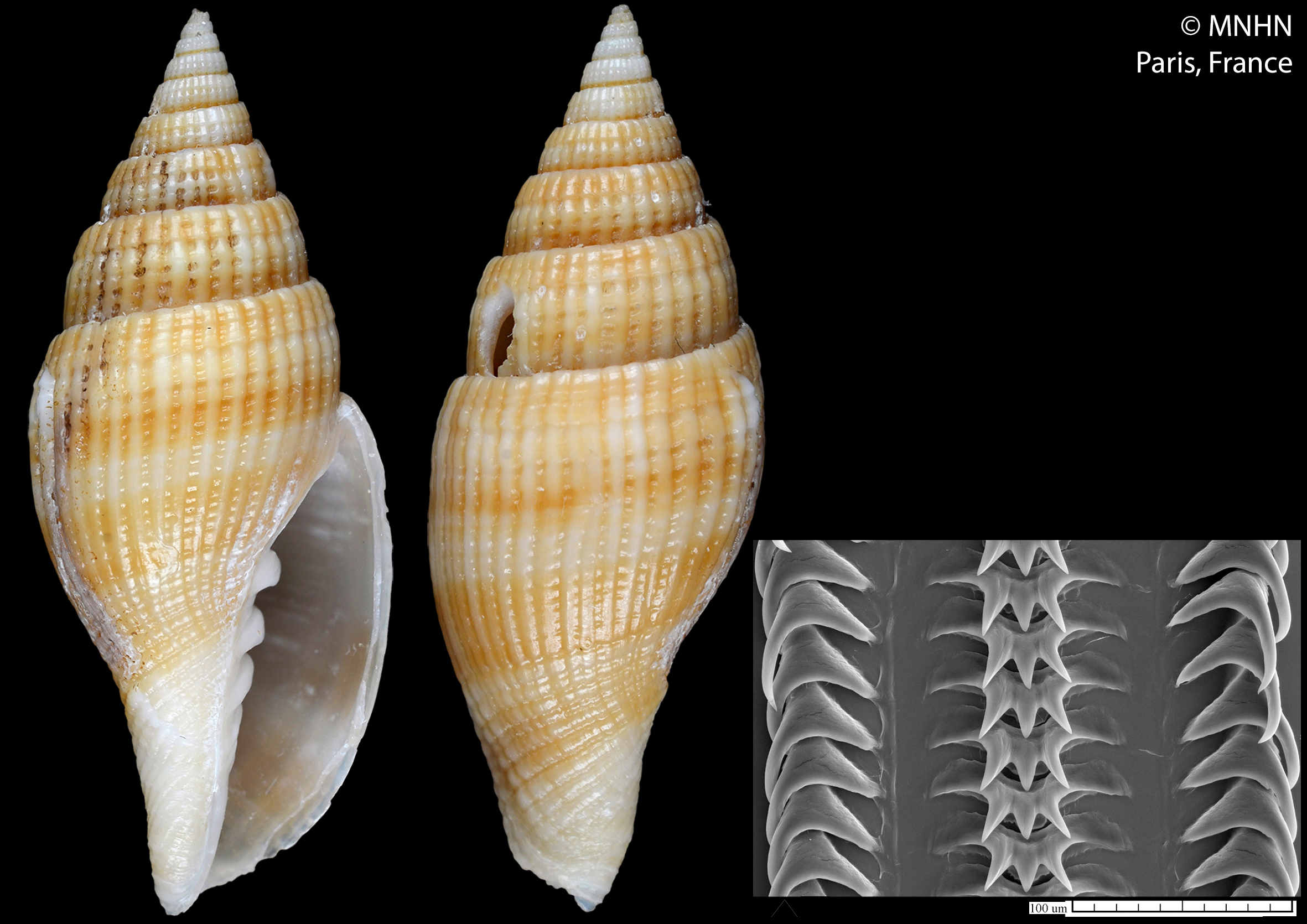
- Shell and radula of Tosapusia vitiaz (holotype at MNHN, Paris)

Scientific classification
- Kingdom: Animalia
- Phylum: Mollusca
- Class: Gastropoda
- Subclass: Caenogastropoda
- Order: Neogastropoda
- Superfamily: Turbinelloidea
- Family: Costellariidae
- Genus: Tosapusia
- Species: T. vitiaz

Binomial name
- Tosapusia vitiaz Fedosov, Herrmann & Bouchet, 2017

= Tosapusia vitiaz =

Species of gastropod

Tosapusia vitiaz is a species of sea snail, a marine gastropod mollusk, in the family Costellariidae, the ribbed miters.

== Description ==
The length of the shell attains 34.3 mm.

== Holotype ==
The holotype of the species (MNHN IM-2013-40624), measured 34.3 mm.

Type Locality : Papua New Guinea, Vitiaz Strait, BIOPAPUA, station DW3719, at a depth of 410 meters.

== Distribution ==
This species occurs in Papua New Guinea.
