= Indian bead =

Fossilized stem segment of a crinoid

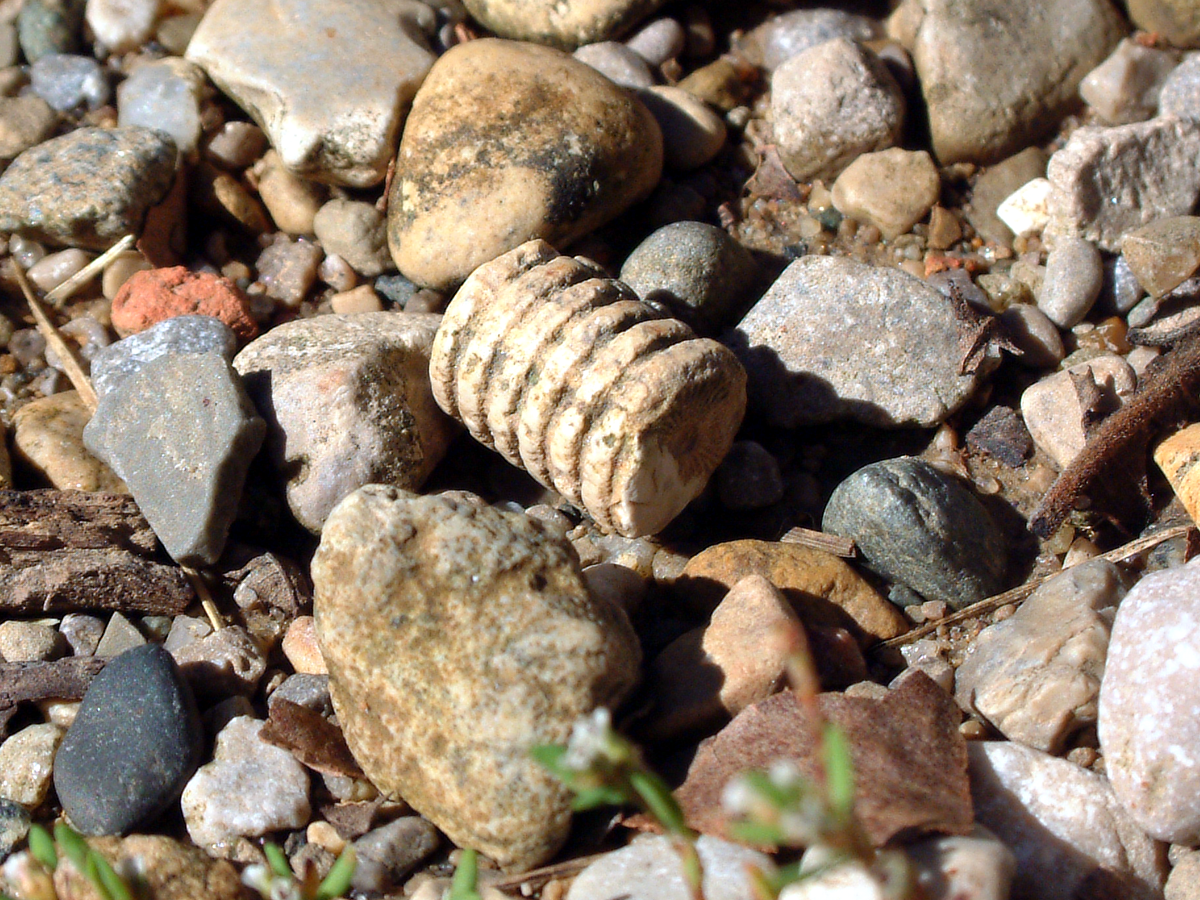
An Indian bead in Indiana gravel.

Indian bead is a colloquial American term for a fossilized stem segment of a columnal crinoid, a marine echinoderm of the class Crinoidea. The fossils, generally a centimeter or less in diameter, tend to be cylindrical with a small hole (either open or filled) along the axis and can resemble unstrung beads. The fossils are abundant in certain areas, including parts of the American Midwest where they are present in gravel. They are sometimes also referred to as "Indian money".

The same item is known as Bonifatius pfennige in German ("Saint Boniface pennies") and St Cuthbert's beads in the United Kingdom.

== Gallery ==
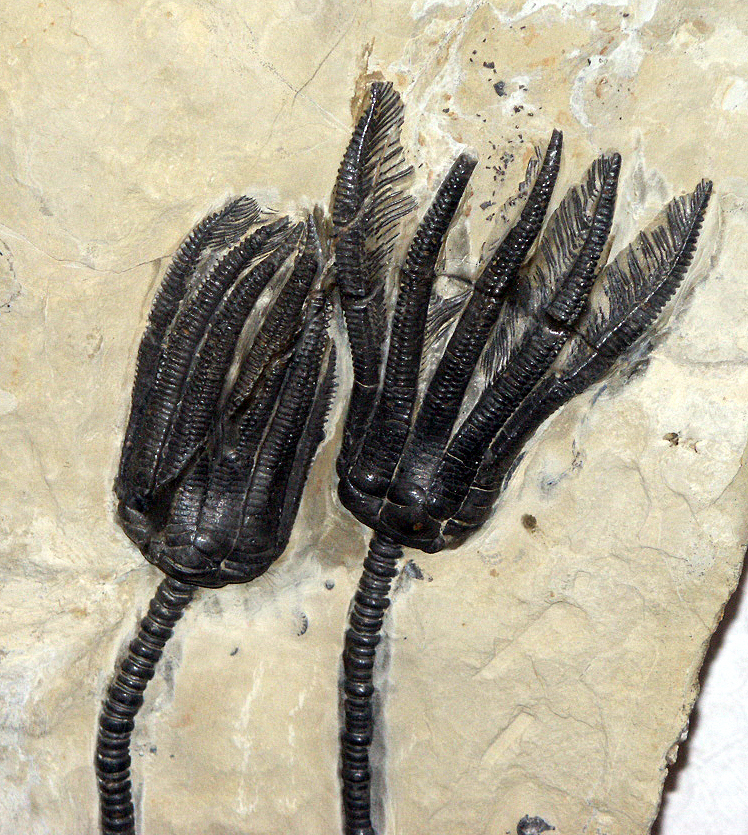
Rare fossil of a crinoid completely intact

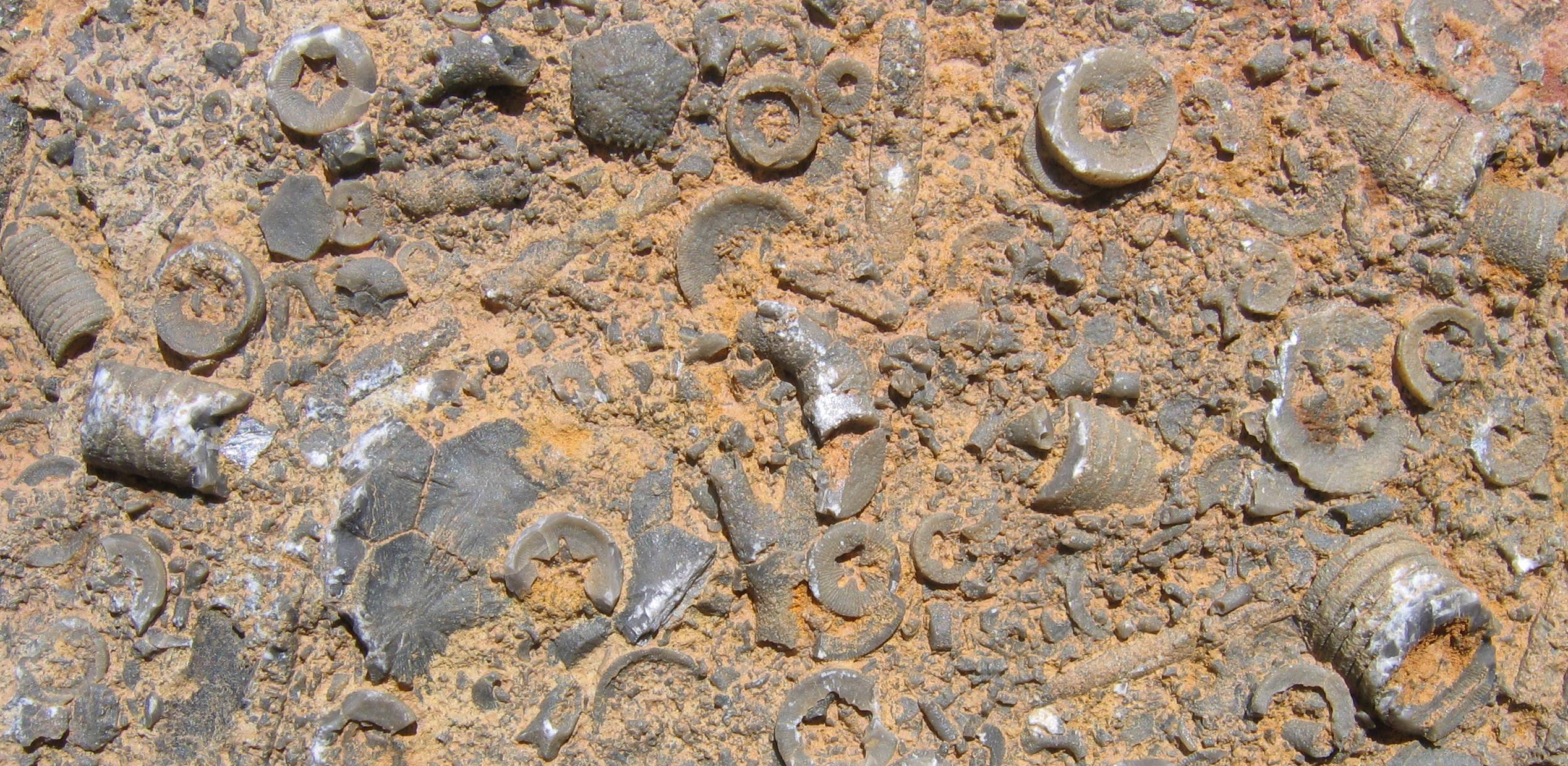
Calcified in limestone

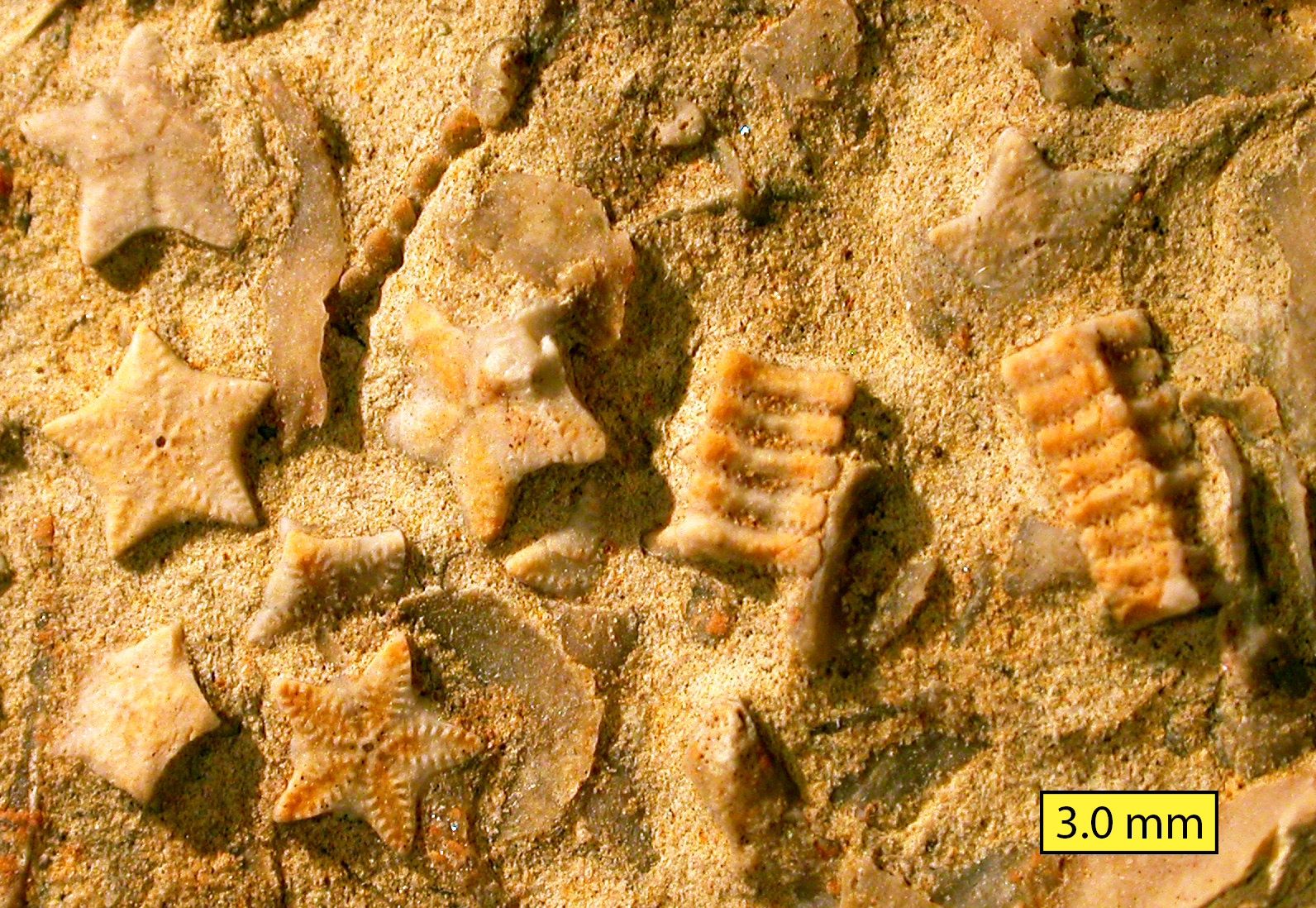
Fossils from the Jurassic period

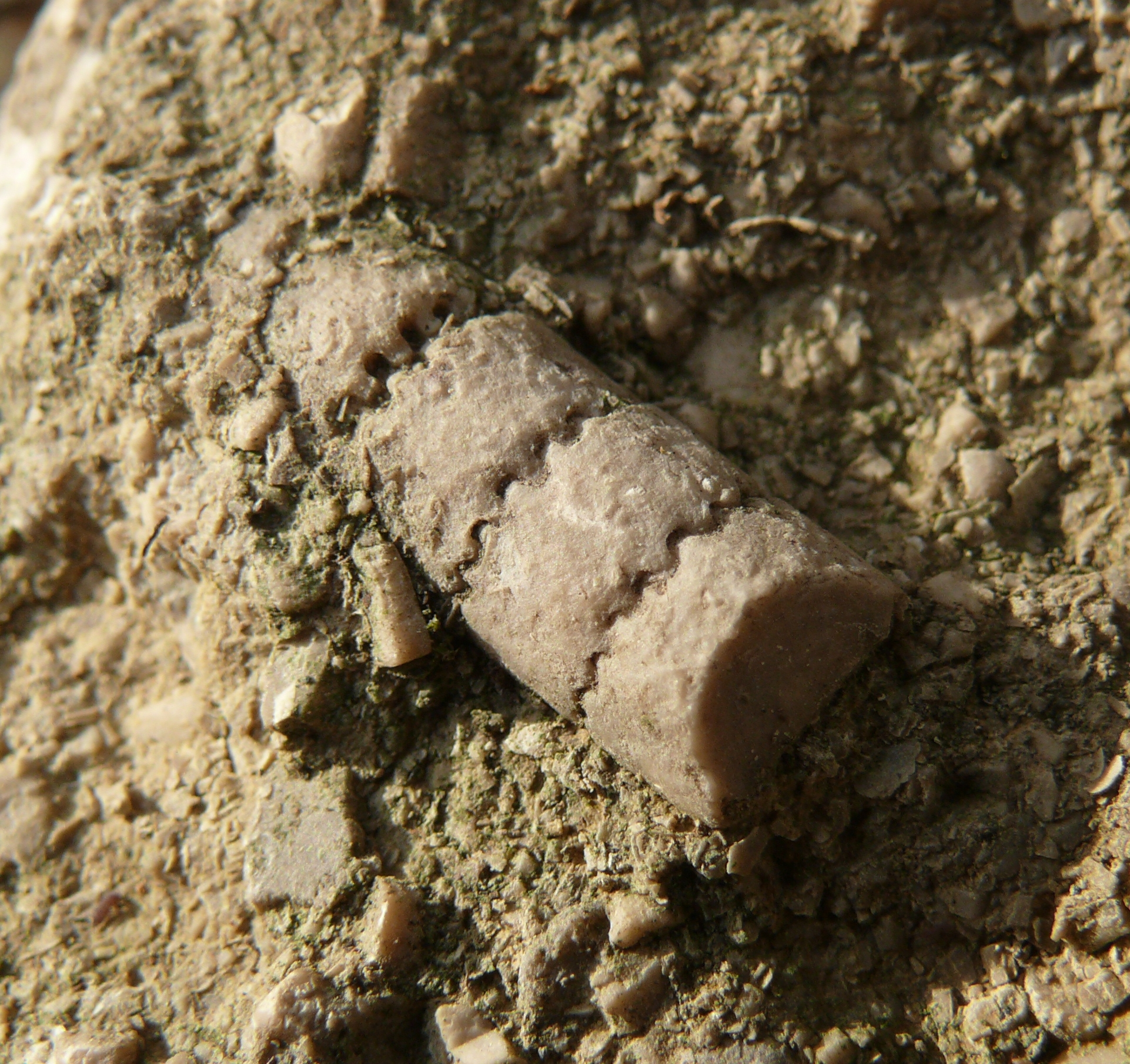
Intact stem of a crinoid, still embedded

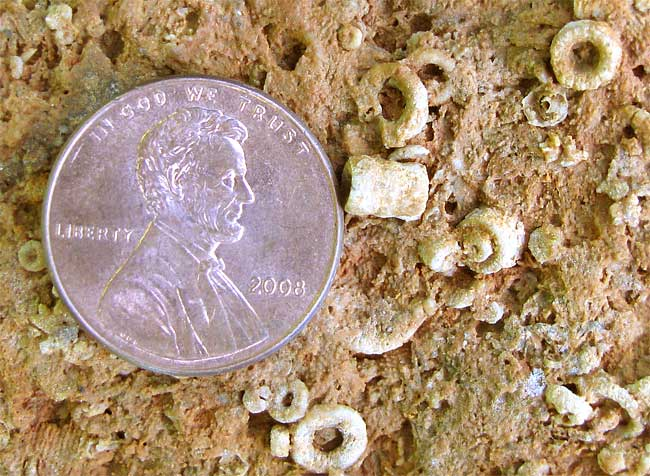
Small beads shown in comparison to a penny

== See also ==
- St. Cuthbert's beads, name for identical bead in Great Britain
