= Thomas Tate (mathematician) =

English mathematical, scientific educator & writer (1807-1888)

Thomas Turner Tate (1807–1888) was an English mathematical and scientific educator and writer. Largely self-taught, he has been described as "a remarkable pioneer of science and mathematics teaching".

== Biography ==
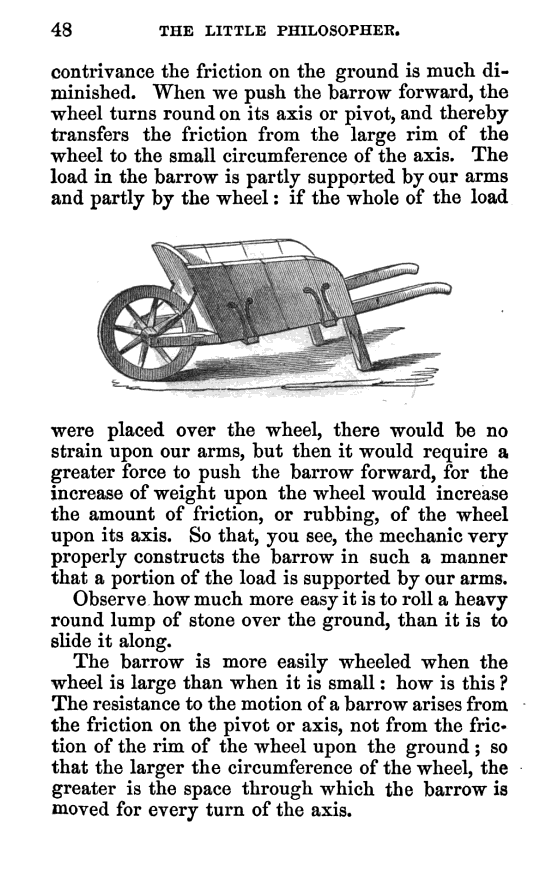
Page from The Little Philosopher, Or The Science of Familiar Things vol. 1 (1863 edition), by Thomas Tate, a work considered to come close to the educational aims of Frederick Temple in developing the "science of common things" as a teaching method

=== Early life ===
Born at Alnwick on 28 February 1807, he was son of Ralph Tate, a builder; his mother's maiden name was Turner, and George Tate was his brother. Initially expected to take up his father's business, he studied under an architect in Edinburgh.

After his father's death, Tate changed direction from 1830. He lectured to local evening classes. In 1835 he was the appointed lecturer on chemistry to the medical school in York. York Medical Society was founded in 1834; the Medical School in fact was founded formally in 1838, and then lasted for about three decades.

=== Teacher training ===
In 1840 Tate became master of the mathematical and scientific department at the Battersea teacher training college; this was a private venture founded in 1839–40 by James Kay-Shuttleworth. Kay-Shuttleworth recruited Tate and two Scots, William Horne and Walter McLeod, to launch what was a new initiative in training, and textbook writing. Tate went on to write educational works on mathematics, mechanics, drawing, and natural science. His Principles of Geometry, Mensuration, Trigonometry, Land Surveying, and Levelling (London, 1848) was translated into Hindustani.

In 1849 Tate obtained a similar post at the Kneller Hall training college. Its foundation was an initiative of the principal Frederick Temple, but the staff were few: Francis Turner Palgrave was vice-principal, Tate taught mathematics and science, and James Tilliard languages, geography and music. The mission was to instruct teachers for paupers (i.e. those in workhouses). For a period Temple led discussion at Kneller Hall of radical education reform, with his friend Ralph Lingen and others. The flow of visitors there was closely linked to Balliol College, Oxford, and also literary circles.

With Temple, Tate worked to select chemical and electrical equipment for school science teaching, and a government grant was made available to subsidise its sale.

Tate was elected fellow of the Royal Astronomical Society on 14 March 1851. During the 1850s his approach to teaching through the "science of common things" became fashionable: Tate's reaction was that he had been using it for two decades. He traced the pedagogic tradition in which he stood as Locke, Pestalozzi, the object lesson, David Stow and Samuel Wilderspin. He had taken advice from Henry Moseley in his days at Battersea, and through Kay-Shuttleworth was influenced by the ideas of Richard Dawes. The thinking was to tackle the needs of a working-class education.

The college was closed down in 1856, and a pension was given to Tate. The institution had run into problems on the political front, where the Derby administration of the early 1850s disapproved, and also because it admitted some nonconformists as trainees. John Bull had called it a "godless college" and complained of the cost in 1849.

=== Death ===
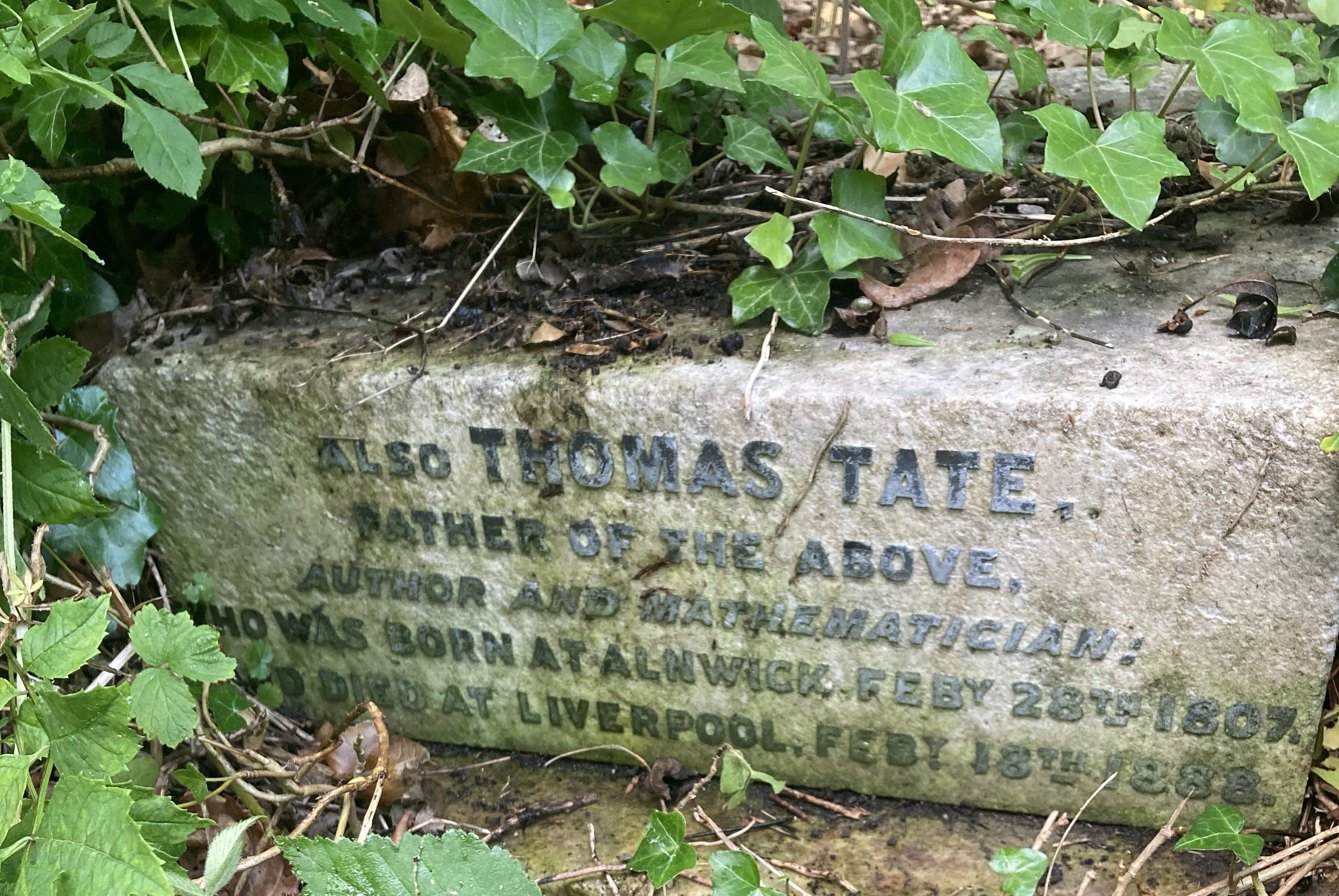
Grave of Thomas Tate in Highgate Cemetery

Tate died at his residence, 51 Catherine Street, Liverpool, on 18 February 1888, and was buried on the eastern side of Highgate Cemetery.

=== Family ===
Tate was twice married; his second wife Lavinia survived him. Three children were living at the–date of his death: of those Ralph Tate was his son by his first wife, Frances Hunter, and George Tate (1858–1933) the chemist was another son.

== Work ==
Tate was the author of numerous educational works on mathematics, mechanics, drawing, and natural science, all tending to promote intellectual methods of instruction. His 'Principles of Geometry, Mensuration, Trigonometry, Land Surveying, and Levelling' (London, 1848, 12mo) was translated into: Hindustani.

His 'Philosophy of Education' (London, 1854, 8vo) reached a third edition in 1860; it showed Tate's debts to Francis Bacon, John Locke, Johann Pestalozzi and faculty psychology; it is noted for its advocacy of the inductive method. From 1853 to 1855, with Tilliard, he edited the Educational Expositor, a work designed to assist schoolmasters and teachers.

From 1853 to 1855, in company with James Tilleard, he edited the 'Educational Expositor,' a work designed to assist schoolmasters and teachers. In 1856 he began to publish 'Mathematics for Working Men,' London, 8vo, but only one part appeared.

At York, Tate wrote a mathematical column for the York Courant.In 1856 he began to publish Mathematics for Working Men, London: only one part appeared. In mathematical pedagogy, Tate favoured the teaching of estimation at an elementary level.

In experimental science and engineering, Tate contributed to the Philosophical Magazine, With William Fairbairn, he was the author of memoirs in the Transactions of the Royal Society, on the vapour-tension of superheated steam, the strength of materials in relation to the construction of iron ships, the strength of glass tubes, and the elasticity of sulphuric acid. He was the inventor of a double-piston air-pump that was known by his name.

== Selected publications ==
- Exercises in arithmetic for elementary schools, 1844
- Principles of Geometry, Mensuration, Trigonometry, Land Surveying, and Levelling (London, 1848)
- Educational Expositor, with James Tilleard (eds.), 1853 to 1855
- The principles of mechanical philosophy applied to industrial mechanics: forming a sequel to the author's "Exercises on mechanics and natural philosophy, 1853.
- Philosophy of Education (London, 1854)
- Mathematics for Working Men, London, 1956.
- An elementary course of natural and experimental philosophy, 1856
- The principles of the differential and integral calculus, simplified, and applied to the solution of various useful problems in practical mathematics and mechanics. By Thomas Tate, 1863

Works about Thomas Tate

- Peter Hinchliff (1998). Frederick Temple, Archbishop of Canterbury. Oxford, Clarendon Press. ISBN 0198263864.
- David Layton (1974). Science for the People: The Origins of the School Science Curriculum in England. Science History Publications. ISBN 978-0-88202-028-0.
