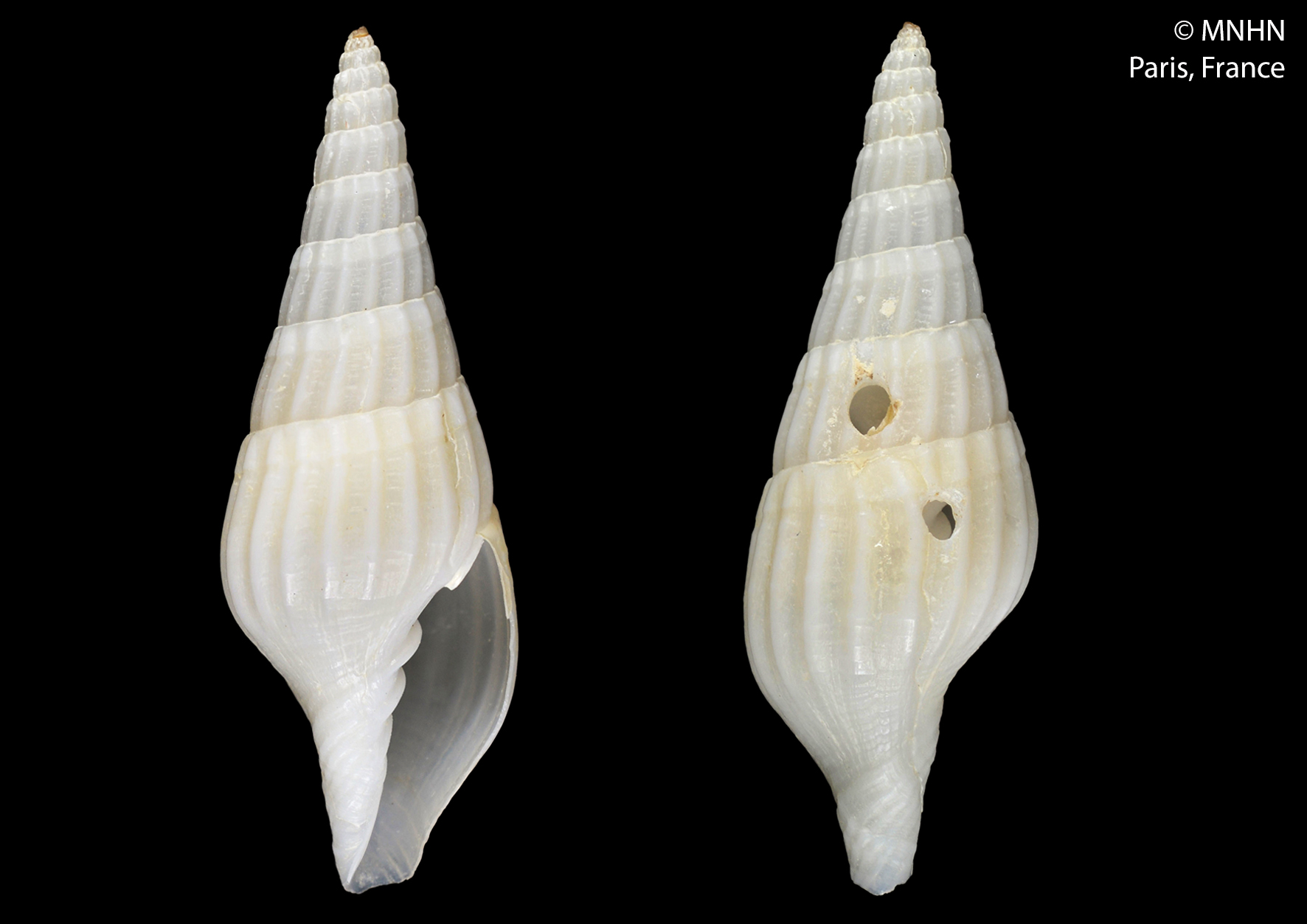
- Shell of Tosapusia myurella (holotype at MNHN, Paris)

Scientific classification
- Kingdom: Animalia
- Phylum: Mollusca
- Class: Gastropoda
- Subclass: Caenogastropoda
- Order: Neogastropoda
- Superfamily: Turbinelloidea
- Family: Costellariidae
- Genus: Tosapusia
- Species: T. myurella

Binomial name
- Tosapusia myurella Fedosov, Herrmann & Bouchet, 2017

= Tosapusia myurella =

Species of gastropod

Tosapusia myurella is a species of sea snail, a marine gastropod mollusk, in the family Costellariidae, the ribbed miters. The length of the shell attains 29.1 mm.

== Distribution ==
This species occurs in the following locations:

- Papua New Guinea
- Solomon Islands
