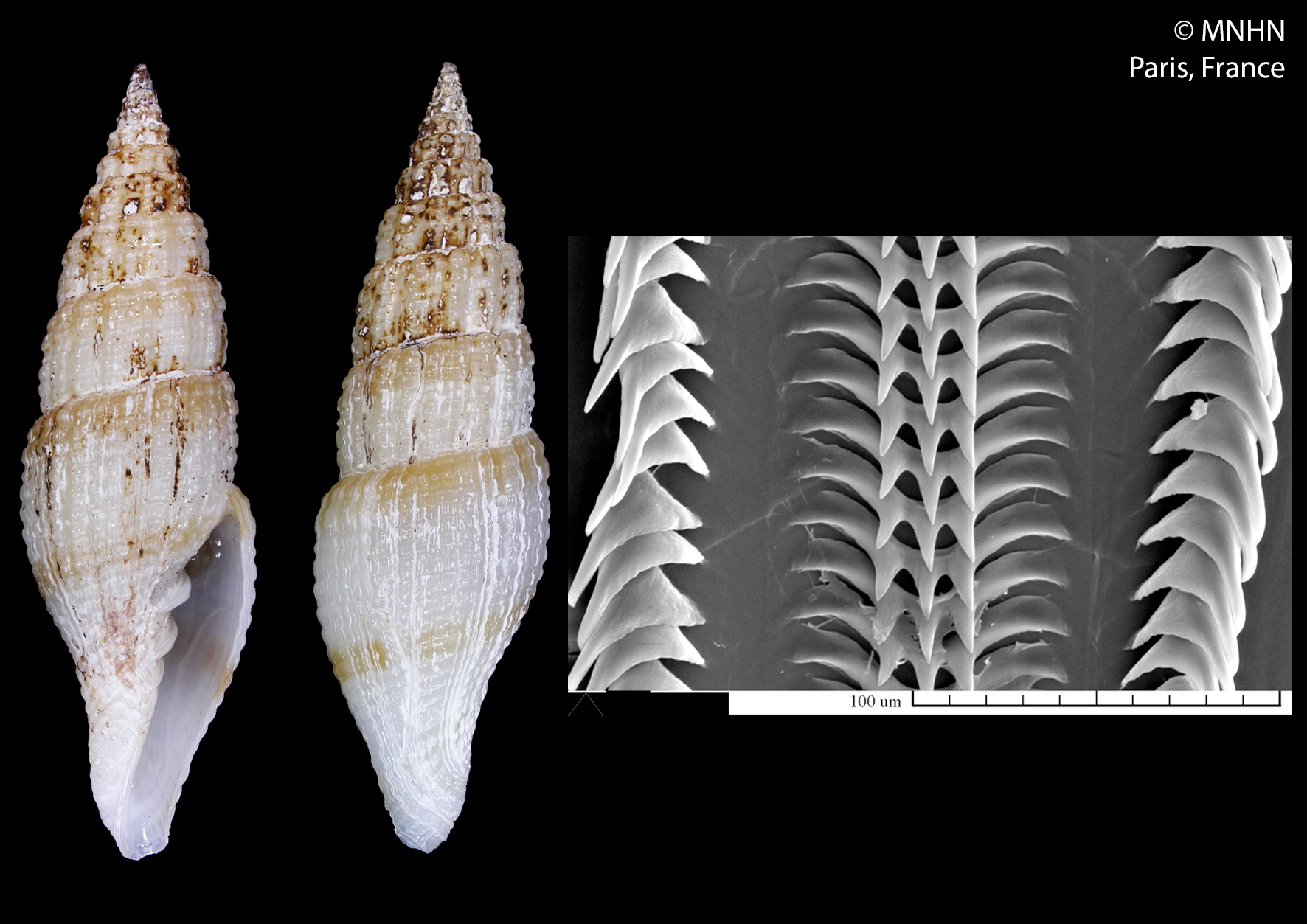
- Shell and radula of Tosapusia longirostris (specimen at MNHN, Paris)

Scientific classification
- Kingdom: Animalia
- Phylum: Mollusca
- Class: Gastropoda
- Subclass: Caenogastropoda
- Order: Neogastropoda
- Superfamily: Turbinelloidea
- Family: Costellariidae
- Genus: Tosapusia
- Species: T. longirostris

Binomial name
- Tosapusia longirostris Fedosov, Herrmann & Bouchet, 2017

= Tosapusia longirostris =

Species of gastropod

Tosapusia longirostris is a species of sea snail, a marine gastropod mollusk, in the family Costellariidae, the ribbed miters.

== Description ==
The length of the shell attains 22.3 mm.

== Distribution ==
This species occurs in the following locations:

- Philippines
- Solomon Islands
