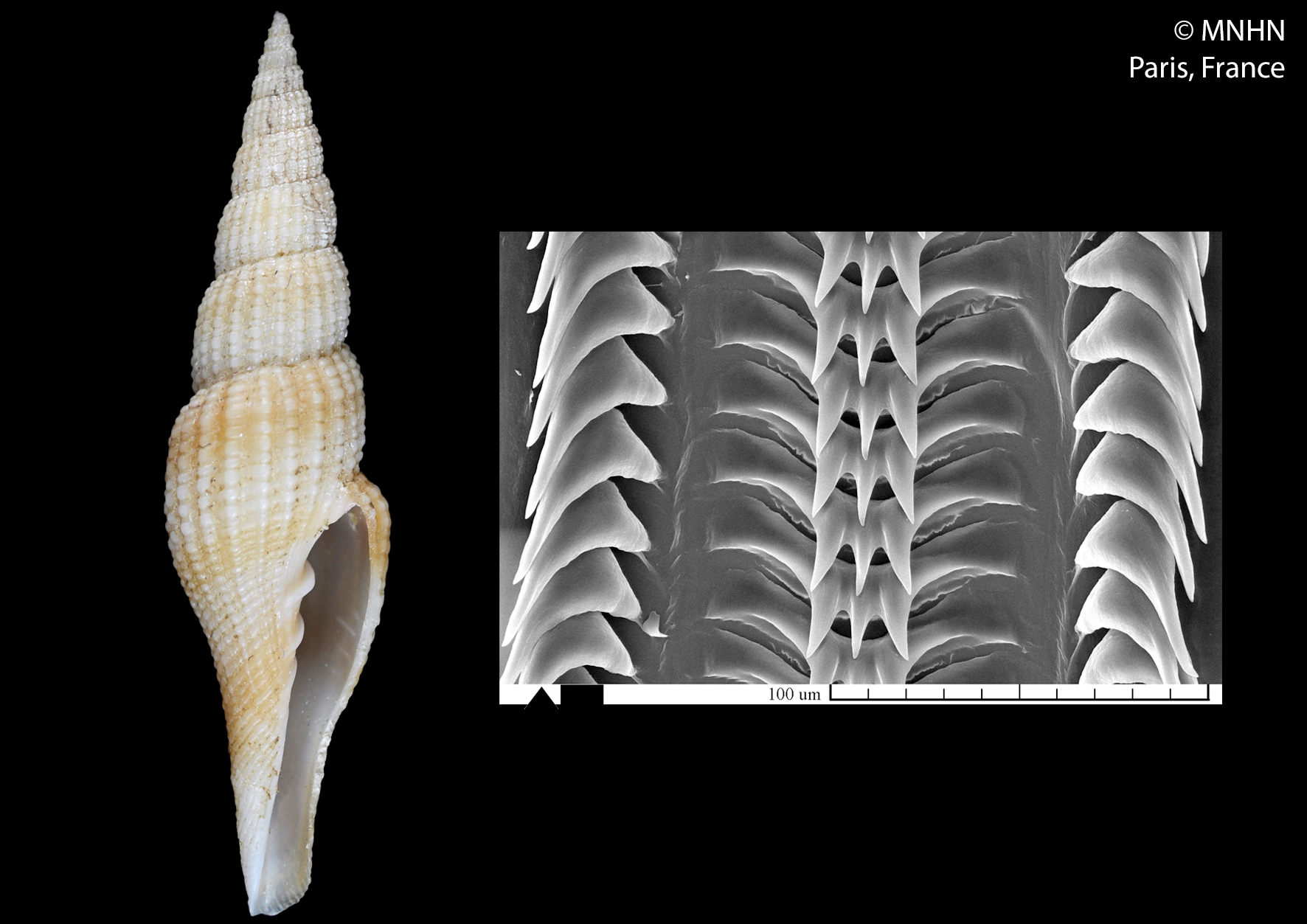
- Shell and radula of Tosapusia evelyniana (specimen at MNHN, Paris)

Scientific classification
- Kingdom: Animalia
- Phylum: Mollusca
- Class: Gastropoda
- Subclass: Caenogastropoda
- Order: Neogastropoda
- Superfamily: Turbinelloidea
- Family: Costellariidae
- Genus: Tosapusia
- Species: T. evelyniana

Binomial name
- Tosapusia evelyniana (Huang, 2017)

Synonyms
- Tosapusia evelynae (Guillot de Suduiraut, 2007); Vexillum (Costellaria) evelynae Guillot de Suduiraut, 2007; Vexillum evelynae Guillot de Suduiraut, 2007; Vexillum evelynianum Huang, 2017

= Tosapusia evelyniana =

Species of gastropod

Tosapusia evelyniana is a species of sea snail, a marine gastropod mollusk, in the family Costellariidae, the ribbed miters.

== Description ==
The holotype of the species (MNHN IM-2000-20641), measured 31.7 millimetres (1.25 in).

== Distribution ==
This marine species occurs off Madagascar and the Philippines (Bohol, off Balicasag Island).
