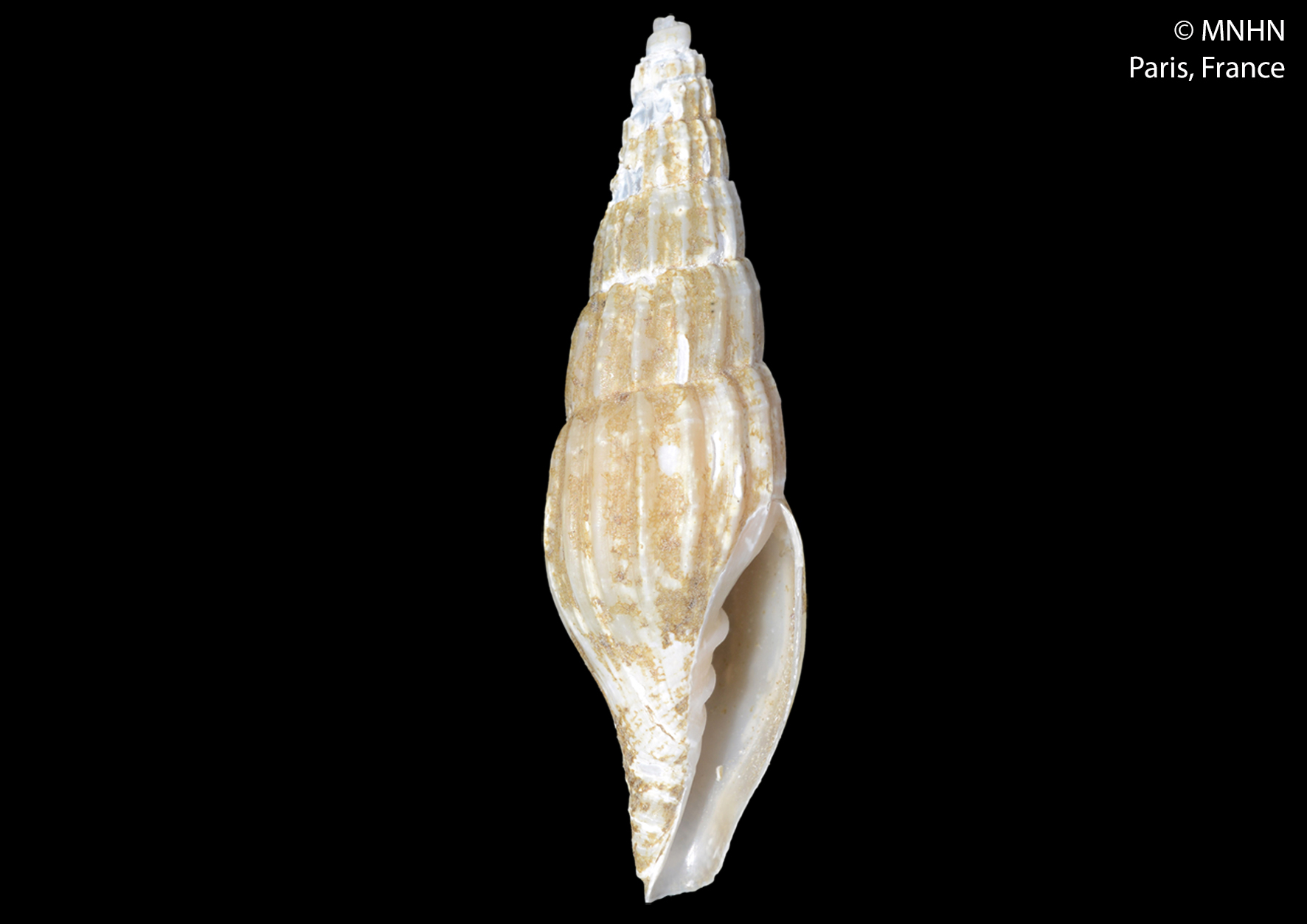
- Shell of Tosapusia duplex (specimen at MNHN, Paris)

Scientific classification
- Kingdom: Animalia
- Phylum: Mollusca
- Class: Gastropoda
- Subclass: Caenogastropoda
- Order: Neogastropoda
- Superfamily: Turbinelloidea
- Family: Costellariidae
- Genus: Tosapusia
- Species: T. duplex

Binomial name
- Tosapusia duplex (Cernohorsky, 1982)

Synonyms
- † Benthovoluta ovalatita Hu & Li, 1991; Mitra simplicissima Schepman, 1911; Mitra simplicissima var. glabra Schepman, 1911; Tongsuapusia duplex (Cernohorsky, 1982); Vexillum (Costellaria) duplex Cernohorsky, 1982; Vexillum duplex Cernohorsky, 1982; Vexillum pratasense T. C. Lan, 2004

= Tosapusia duplex =

Species of gastropod

Tosapusia duplex is a species of sea snail, a marine gastropod mollusk, in the family Costellariidae, the ribbed miters.

== Distribution ==
This species occurs in the following locations:

- Indonesia
- Papua New Guinea (Type locality)
- Solomon Islands
- South China Sea
