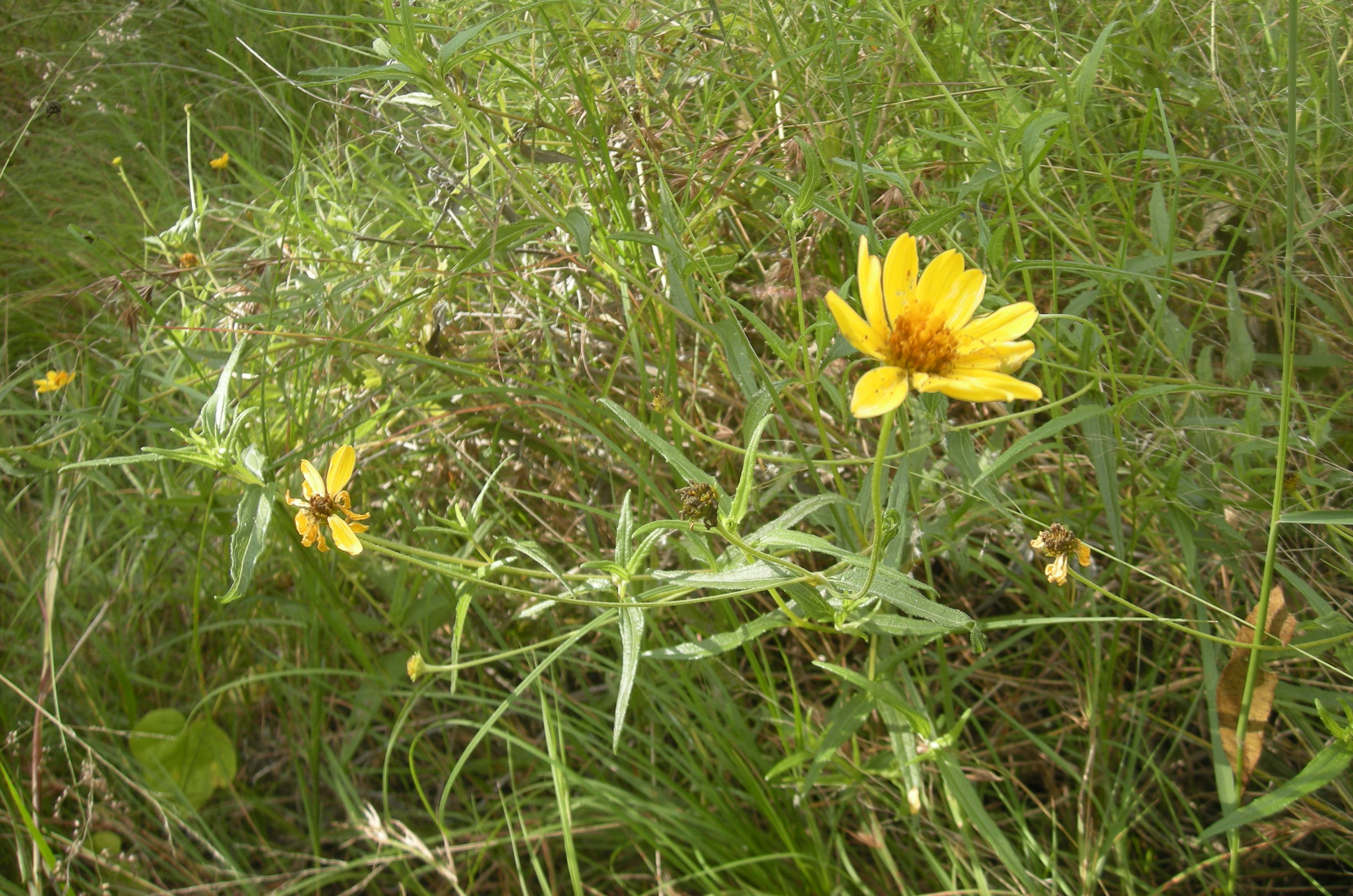

Scientific classification
- Kingdom: Plantae
- Clade: Tracheophytes
- Clade: Angiosperms
- Clade: Eudicots
- Clade: Asterids
- Order: Asterales
- Family: Asteraceae
- Tribe: Heliantheae
- Genus: Apowollastonia
- Species: A. spilanthoides

Binomial name
- Apowollastonia spilanthoides (F.Muell.) Orchard

Synonyms
- Seruneum spilanthoides (F.Muell.) Kuntze; Wedelia spilanthoides F.Muell.; Niebuhria spilanthoides Britten; Seruneum spilanthodes Kuntze

= Apowollastonia spilanthoides =

Species of flowering plant

Apowollastonia spilanthoides is a herbaceous flowering plant in the family Asteraceae. The natural habitat is open woodland of Australia and New Guinea. It was first described by Victorian State Botanist Ferdinand von Mueller in 1865.
