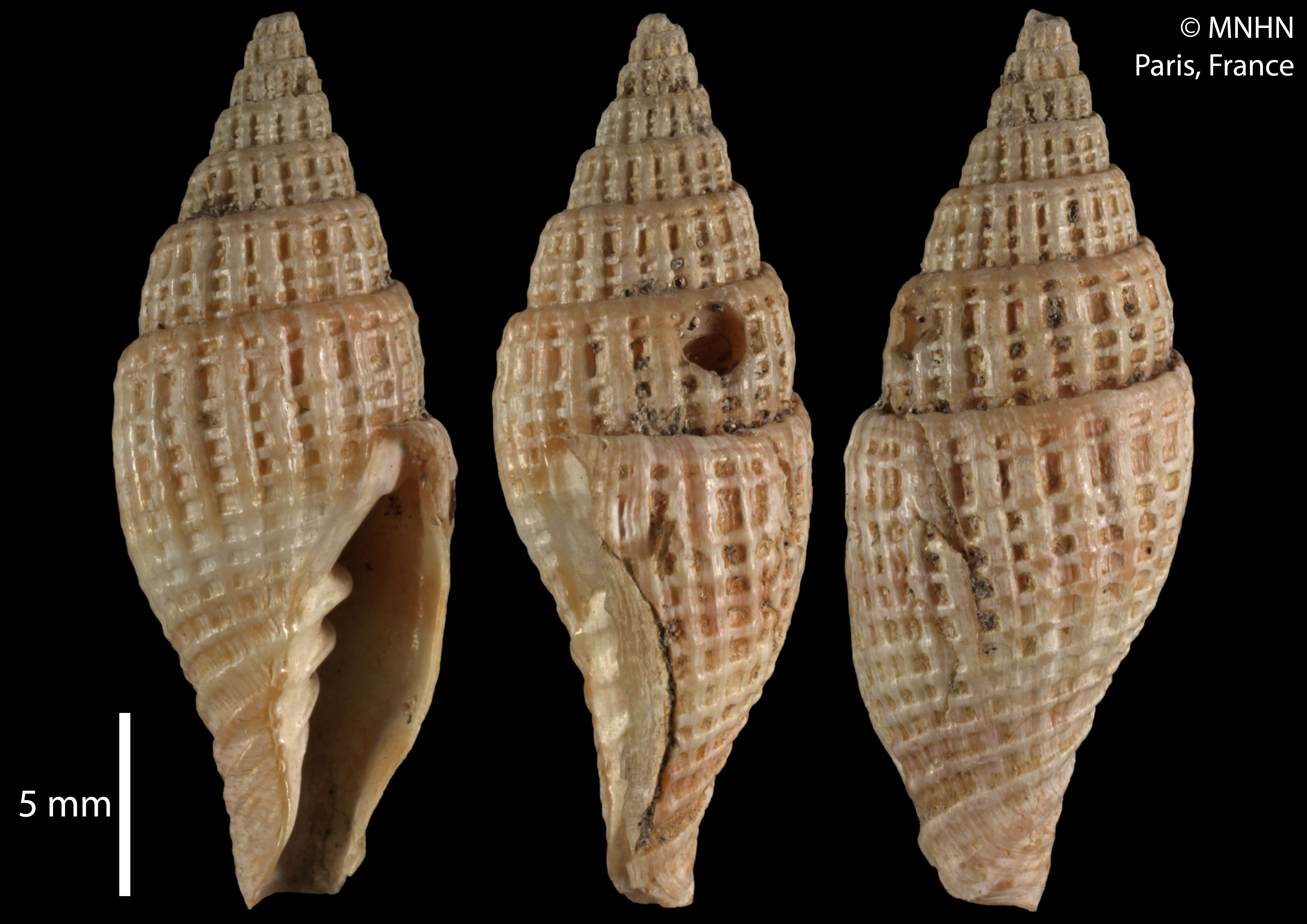
- Shell of Tosapusia kurodai (specimen at MNHN, Paris)

Scientific classification
- Kingdom: Animalia
- Phylum: Mollusca
- Class: Gastropoda
- Subclass: Caenogastropoda
- Order: Neogastropoda
- Superfamily: Turbinelloidea
- Family: Costellariidae
- Genus: Tosapusia
- Species: T. kurodai

Binomial name
- Tosapusia kurodai (Sakurai & Habe, 1964)

Synonyms
- Mitropifex kurodai Sakurai & Habe, 1964; Vexillum (Costellaria) kurodai (Sakurai & Habe, 1964); Vexillum kurodai (Sakurai & Habe, 1964)

= Tosapusia kurodai =

Species of gastropod

Tosapusia kurodai is a species of sea snail, a marine gastropod mollusk, in the family Costellariidae, the ribbed miters.

== Description ==
The length of the shell attains 32.3 mm.

== Distribution ==
This species occurs in the following locations:

- New Caledonia
- Papua New Guinea
- Philippines
- Japan
