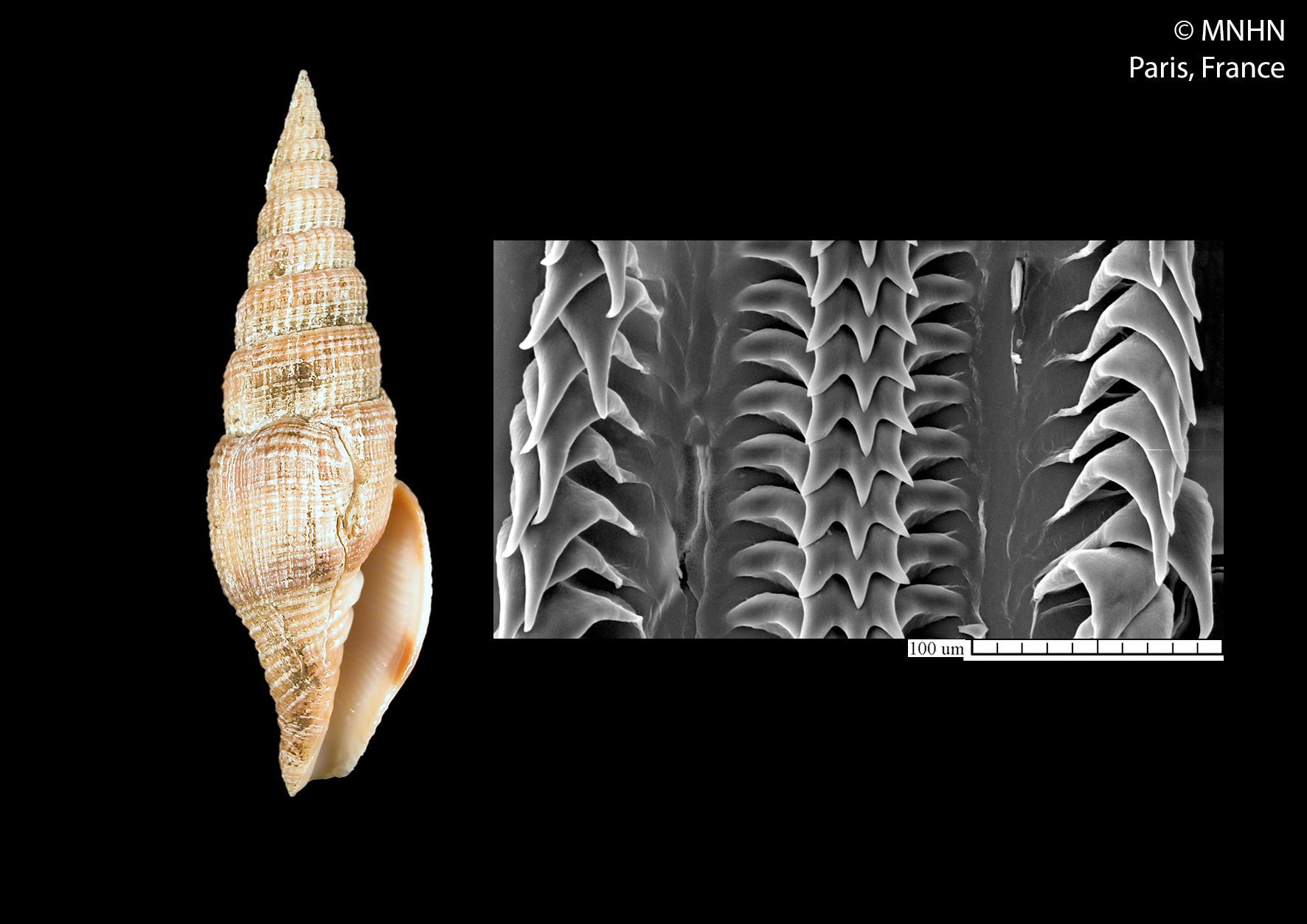
- Shell and radula of Tosapusia isaoi (specimen at MNHN, Paris)

Scientific classification
- Kingdom: Animalia
- Phylum: Mollusca
- Class: Gastropoda
- Subclass: Caenogastropoda
- Order: Neogastropoda
- Superfamily: Turbinelloidea
- Family: Costellariidae
- Genus: Tosapusia
- Species: T. isaoi

Binomial name
- Tosapusia isaoi (Kuroda & Sakurai, 1959)

Synonyms
- Mitropifex isaoi Kuroda & Sakurai, 1959; Mitropifex kurodai Sakurai, K. & Habe, T. 1964; Vexillum (Tosapusia) isaoi (Kuroda & Sakurai, 1959); Vexillum isaoi (Kuroda & Sakurai, 1959)

= Tosapusia isaoi =

Species of gastropod

Tosapusia isaoi is a species of sea snail, a marine gastropod mollusk, in the family Costellariidae, the ribbed miters.

== Description ==
The length of the shell attains 57.6 mm.

== Distribution ==
This marine species occurs off Japan.
