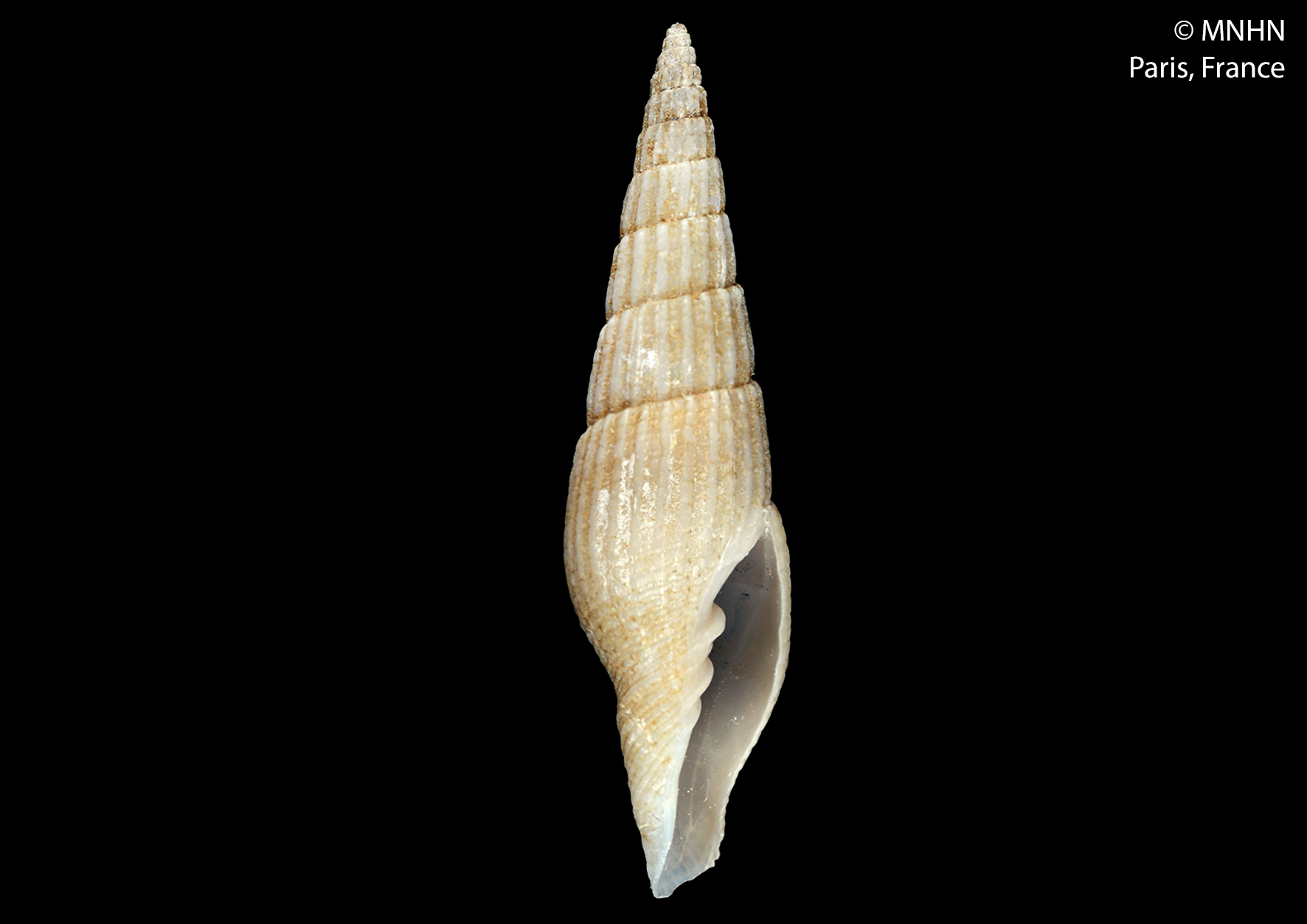
- Shell of Tosapusia bismarckeana (paratype at MNHN, Paris)

Scientific classification
- Kingdom: Animalia
- Phylum: Mollusca
- Class: Gastropoda
- Subclass: Caenogastropoda
- Order: Neogastropoda
- Superfamily: Turbinelloidea
- Family: Costellariidae
- Genus: Tosapusia; Habe, 1964

Type species
- Mitropifex isaoi Kuroda & Sakurai, 1959

Synonyms
- Tongsuapusia Huang, 2015; Vexillum (Tosapusia) Habe, 1964

= Tosapusia =

Genus of gastropods

Tosapusia is a genus of sea snails, marine gastropod mollusks, in the family Costellariidae, the ribbed miters.

== Species ==
Species within the genus Tosapusia include:

- Tosapusia bismarckeana Fedosov, Herrmann & Bouchet, 2017
- † Tosapusia cupressina (Brocchi, 1814)
- Tosapusia duplex (Cernohorsky, 1982)
- Tosapusia evelyniana (Huang, 2017)
- Tosapusia isaoi (Kuroda & Sakurai, 1959)
- † Tosapusia kalimnanensis (Cernohorsky, 1970)
- Tosapusia kurodai (Sakurai & Habe, 1964)
- Tosapusia longirostris Fedosov, Herrmann & Bouchet, 2017
- Tosapusia myurella Fedosov, Herrmann & Bouchet, 2017
- † Tosapusia neudorfensis (Schaffer, 1898)
- † Tosapusia pseudocupressina (Bałuk, 1997)
- Tosapusia sauternesensis (Guillot de Suduiraut, 1997)
- Tosapusia turriformis Fedosov, Herrmann & Bouchet, 2017
- Tosapusia vitiaz Fedosov, Herrmann & Bouchet, 2017

Synonyms

- Tosapusia evelynae (Guillot de Suduiraut, 2007): synonym of Tosapusia evelyniana (S.-I. Huang, 2017)

== Habitat and Distribution ==
As presented in-text in the study of Fedosov et al. (2017):

- "Indo-Pacific, from Madagascar to Japan and French Polynesia, in deep water (300–1000 m) on soft bottoms".
