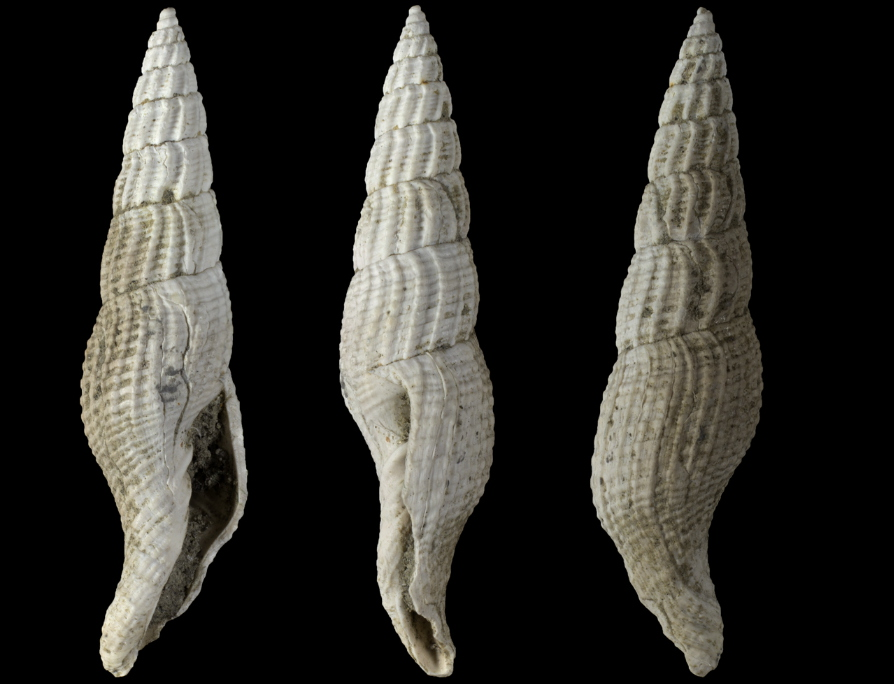
- Shell of †Tosapusia cupressina (specimen at MNHN, Paris)

Scientific classification
- Kingdom: Animalia
- Phylum: Mollusca
- Class: Gastropoda
- Subclass: Caenogastropoda
- Order: Neogastropoda
- Superfamily: Turbinelloidea
- Family: Costellariidae
- Genus: Tosapusia
- Species: †T. cupressina

Binomial name
- †Tosapusia cupressina (Brocchi, 1814

Synonyms
- † Uromitra cupressina (G.B. Brocchi, 1814); †Vexillum cupressinum (Brocchi 1814)

= Tosapusia cupressina =

Extinct species of gastropod

Tosapusia cupressina is an extinct species of sea snail, a marine gastropod mollusk, in the family Costellariidae, the ribbed miters.

== Distribution ==
Fossils of this extinct marine species were found in Pliocene strata in Alpes-Maritimes, France and Miocene strata in Romania.
