= St. Cuthbert's beads =

Fossils used as beads

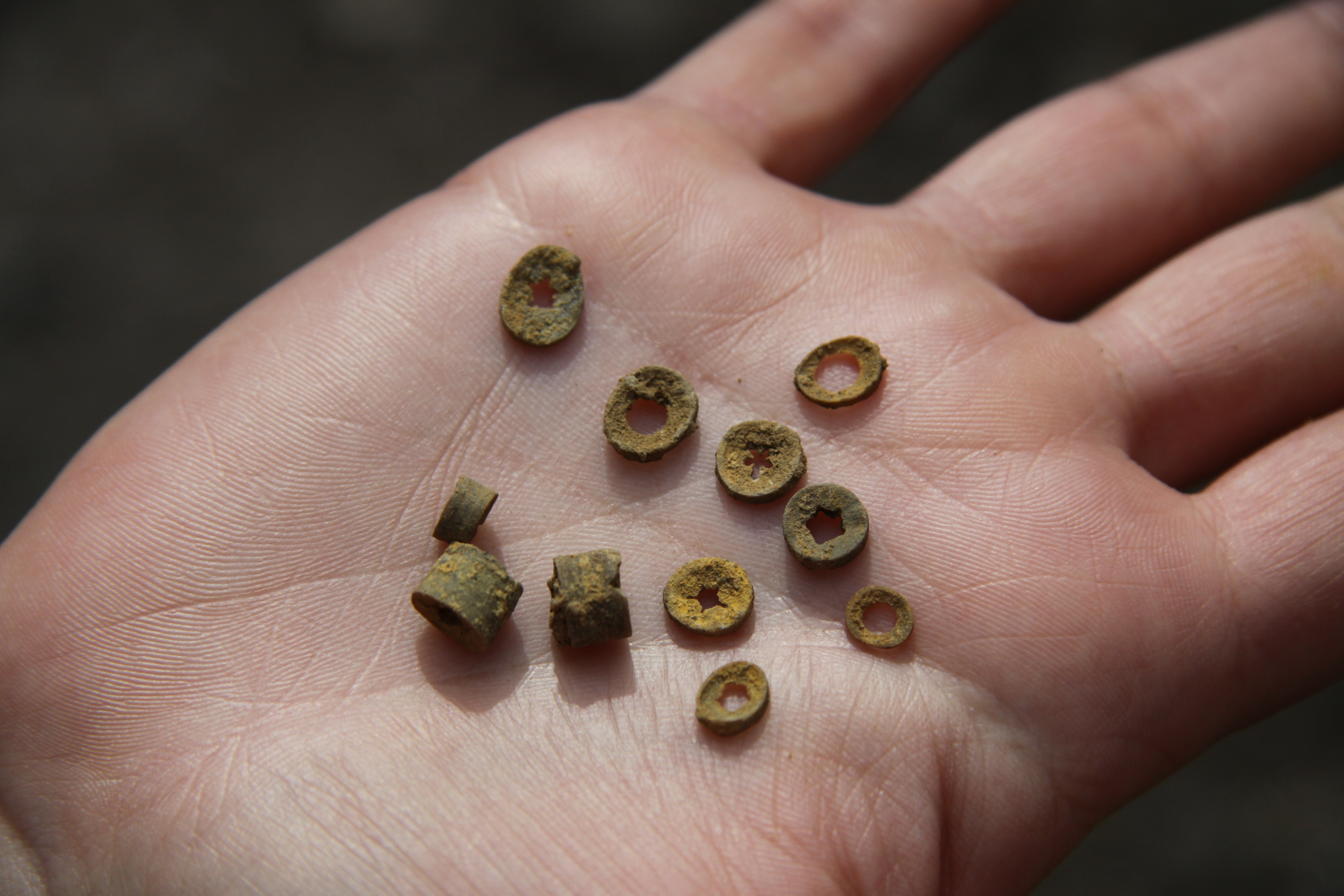
A thread could be passed through the central lumens of these crinoid fossils.

St. Cuthbert's beads (or Cuddy's beads) are fossilised portions of the "stems" of crinoids from the Carboniferous period. Crinoids are a kind of marine echinoderm which are still extant, and which are sometimes known as "sea lilies". These bead-like fossils are washed out onto the beach and in medieval Northumberland were strung together as necklaces or rosaries, and became associated with St Cuthbert.

In other parts of England, circular crinoid columnals were known as "fairy money." Pentagonal crinoid columnals were known as "star stones", and moulds of the stems left impressions which were known as screwstones. In Germany, the columnals were known as Bonifatius pfennige (St Boniface's pennies) and in America they are known as Indian beads.

== Palaeontology ==
The "beads" are thick discs or short cylinders, which, when the crinoid was still alive, were articulated to form a branched structure, linked by soft tissue, nerves and ligaments which occupied the central hole (lumen). The columnals usually became disarticulated after the animal died. Articulated crinoid fossils are relatively rare, but disarticulated columnals are quite common in the fossil record. They may be extracted from their matrix (often limestone) or, in the case of exposures in coastal cliffs, they can sometimes be found washed out of the matrix and deposited on the foreshore, as if from the sea.

== History ==
In medieval Northumberland, the fossilised columnals were collected at Lindisfarne, and strung together as a necklace or rosary. Over time, they became associated with St. Cuthbert, who was a monk on Lindisfarne and the nearby island of Hobthrush (also known as St Cuthbert's Isle) in the 7th century and became Bishop of Lindisfarne. According to legend, it was said that St. Cuthbert used the beads as a rosary, or that his spirit created them on stormy nights so they could be found on the beach the next morning. Lane and Ausich (2001) suggest that the beads were not associated with St. Cuthbert before the 12th century, and may have become popular after a limestone quarry came into operation on Lindisfarne in the 14th century.

The first known reference to Cuthbert's beads in a documentary source is found in an account of a visit to Lindisfarne by a John Ray in 1671:

July the 22nd we rode from Cheviot, or rather Waller or Wooler, to the Holy Island, nine miles, where we gathered, on the sea shore under the town, those stones which they call St Cuthbert's beads, which are nothing else but a sort of entrochi.

It is unclear to what extent the origin and nature of the fossils was understood in earlier times. The peculiar stones have been categorized with "Devil's toenails" (Gryphaea shells), "snakestones" (ammonites), "St Peter's fingers" or "Devil's fingers" or "thunderbolts" (belemnites). It is clear that in their first documented mention as "St. Cuthbert's Beads" by John Ray in 1671, they were understood to be "entrochi", and by 1673, Martin Lister hypothesised that crinoids were "plants petrified".

The term "St Cuthbert's beads" became a common way of referring to crinoid columnals from the 17th century onwards, and is a term which is still used occasionally in palaeontological writings.

== In literature ==
In Sir Walter Scott's poem Marmion, written in 1808, St. Cuthbert is described (by fishermen) as creating these bead-like fossils at Lindisfarne, Northumberland. The poem also makes reference to St. Hilda of Whitby, Yorkshire who, according to religious legend, turned snakes into stone, the "snake stones" being the numerous fossil ammonites of that area.

But fain Saint Hilda's nuns would learn
If, on a rock by Lindisfarne,
Saint Cuthbert sits, and toils to frame
The sea-born beads that bear his name:
Such tales had Whitby's fishers told
And said they might his shape behold,
And here his anvil sound:
A deadened clang - a huge dim form
Seen but and heard when gathering storm
And night were closing round.
But this, a tale of idle fame,
The nuns of Lindisfarne disclaim. (canto 2, verse 16)

== See also ==
- Indian beads, term for the same fossils in the United States
