= Indocypraea =

Scientific classification
- Kingdom: Plantae
- Clade: Tracheophytes
- Clade: Angiosperms
- Clade: Eudicots
- Clade: Asterids
- Order: Asterales
- Family: Asteraceae
- Genus: Indocypraea; Orchard

Genus of plants

Indocypraea is a genus of flowering plants belonging to the family Asteraceae.

Its native range is Indian subcontinent to Southern China and Indo-China, Jawa.

== Species ==
Species:

- Indocypraea montana (Blume) Orchard
