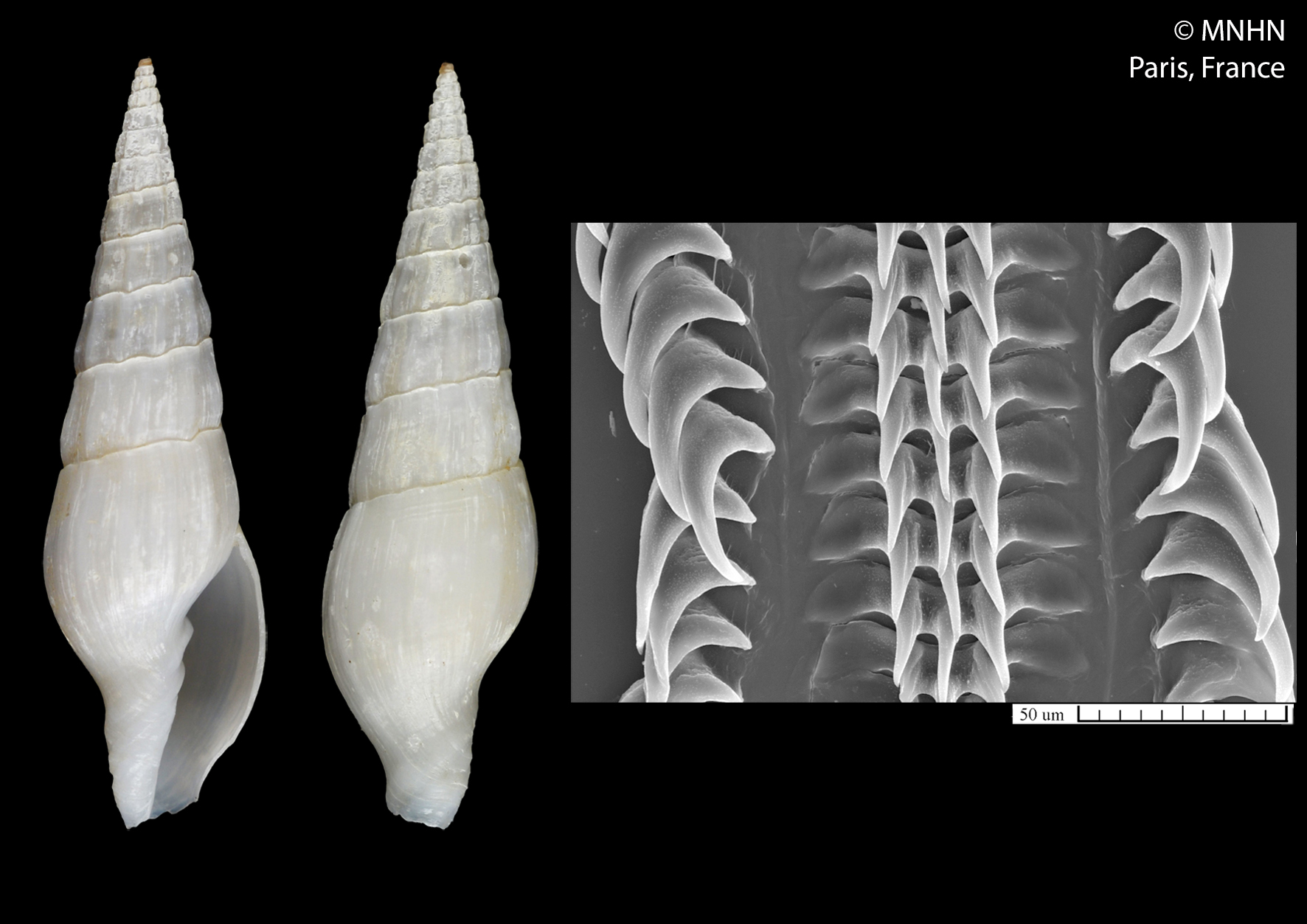
- Shell and radula of Tosapusia turriformis (holotype at MNHN, Paris)

Scientific classification
- Kingdom: Animalia
- Phylum: Mollusca
- Class: Gastropoda
- Subclass: Caenogastropoda
- Order: Neogastropoda
- Superfamily: Turbinelloidea
- Family: Costellariidae
- Genus: Tosapusia
- Species: T. turriformis

Binomial name
- Tosapusia turriformis Fedosov, Herrmann & Bouchet, 2017

= Tosapusia turriformis =

Species of gastropod

Tosapusia turriformis is a species of sea snail, a marine gastropod mollusk, in the family Costellariidae, the ribbed miters.

== Description ==
Tosapusia turriformis possesses a medium-sized, thin-walled shell measuring up to 27.15 mm in height, exhibiting a narrowly turriform shape characterized by a high, slightly acuminate spire and an elongate-fusiform outline with a width-to-height ratio of approximately 0.29. The teleoconch consists of 9.5–11 slightly convex whorls, with early whorls shouldered and subcylindrical, transitioning to flattened adapical profiles in later whorls where the convex periphery is shifted abapically. The last adult whorl is strongly convex, comprising about 52% of the total shell height, and is shortly constricted to a short to moderately long, tapering siphonal canal that is widely open, straight, forming a distinct "waist" at the transition with a slightly concave profile. Sutures are deeply impressed and canaliculated on early spire whorls, becoming slightly wavy and less pronounced on later ones.

== Holotype ==
The holotype of the species (MNHN IM-2013-19792), measured 27.15 mm.

== Distribution ==
This species occurs in the Bismarck Sea, Papua New Guinea.
