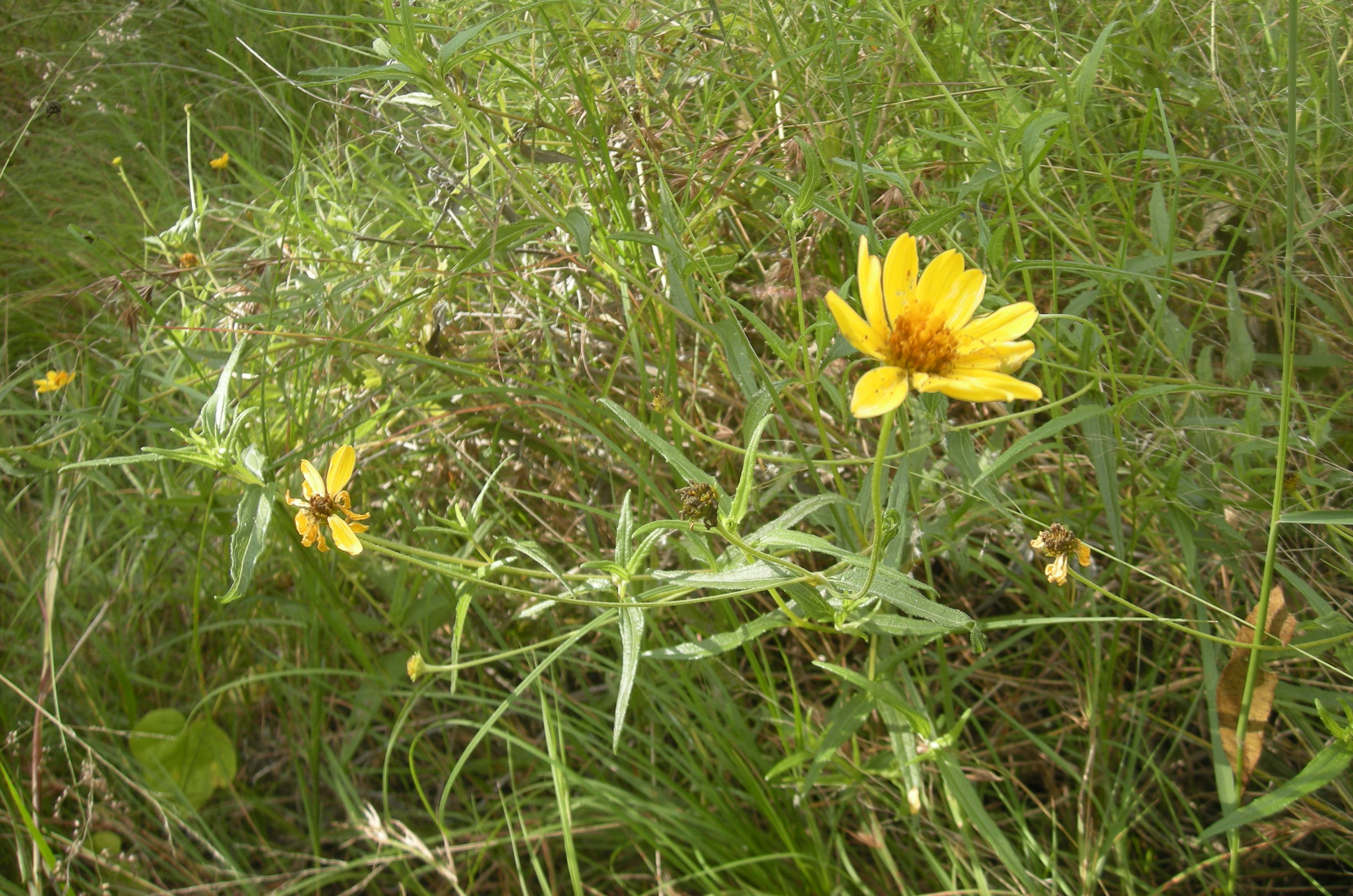
- Apowollastonia spilanthoides

Scientific classification
- Kingdom: Plantae
- Clade: Tracheophytes
- Clade: Angiosperms
- Clade: Eudicots
- Clade: Asterids
- Order: Asterales
- Family: Asteraceae
- Genus: Apowollastonia; Orchard

= Apowollastonia =

Genus of flowering plants

Apowollastonia is a genus of flowering plants belonging to the family Asteraceae.

Its native range is Lesser Sunda Islands to New Guinea and Australia.

Species:

- Apowollastonia cylindrica Orchard
- Apowollastonia hamersleyensis Orchard
- Apowollastonia hibernica Orchard
- Apowollastonia longipes (Klatt) Orchard
- Apowollastonia major Orchard
- Apowollastonia spilanthoides (F.Muell.) Orchard
- Apowollastonia stirlingii (Tate) Orchard
- Apowollastonia verbesinoides (F.Muell. ex Benth.) Orchard
