= Ralph Tate =

British-born botanist and geologist

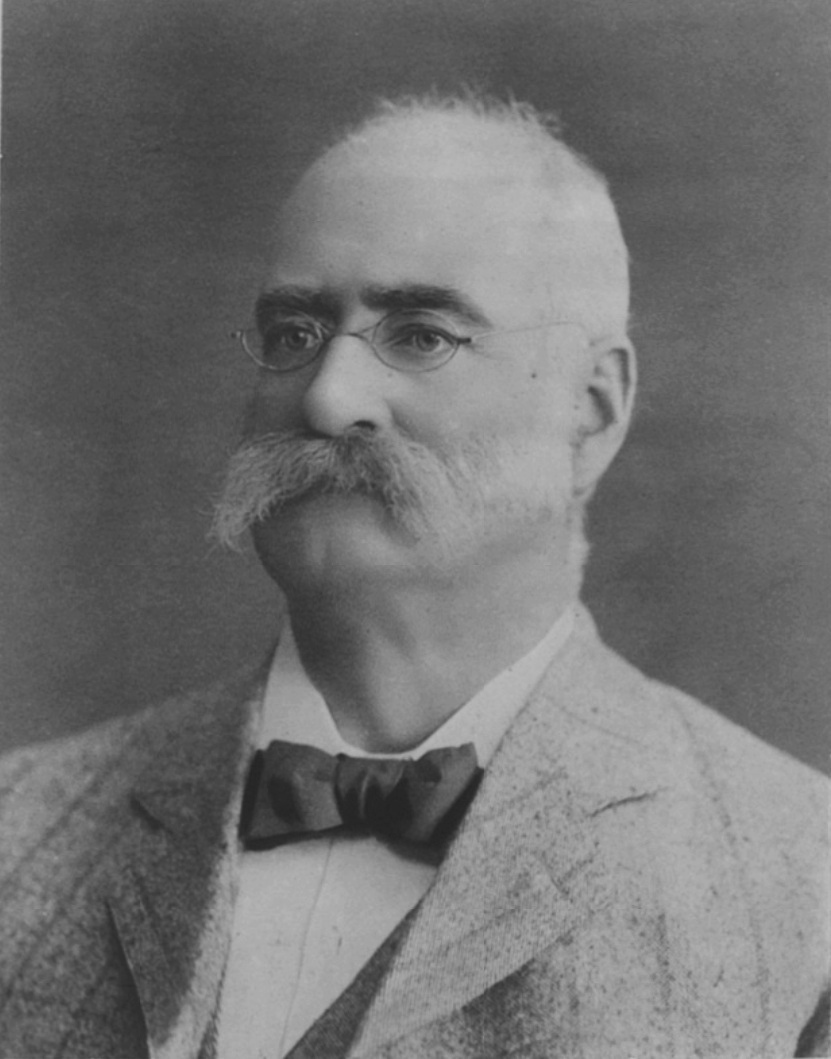
Ralph Tate FGS FLS

Ralph Tate (11 March 1840 – 20 September 1901) was a British-born botanist and geologist, who was later active in Australia.

== Early life ==
Tate was born at Alnwick in Northumberland, the son of Thomas Turner Tate (1807–1888), a teacher of mathematics and science, and his wife Frances (née Hunter). He was nephew to George Tate (1805–1871), naturalist and archaeologist, an active member of the Berwickshire Naturalists' Club. Tate was educated at the Cheltenham Training College and at the Royal School of Mines.

== Scientific career ==
In 1861 Tate was appointed teacher of natural science at the Philosophical Institution in Belfast. There he studied botany, publishing his Flora Belfastiensis in 1863, while also investigating the Cretaceous and Triassic rocks of County Antrim, the results of which he presented to the Geological Society of London. In 1864 Tate was appointed assistant curator at the museum of that society. In 1866 he wrote three botanical papers, and also published A Plain and Easy Account of the Land and Freshwater Mollusks of Great Britain. In 1867 he went on an exploring expedition to Nicaragua and Venezuela. In 1871 he was appointed to the mining school established by the Cleveland ironmasters first at Darlington and later at Redcar. Here he made a special study of the Lias and its fossils, in conjunction with the Rev. J. F. Blake, the results being published in an important work, The Yorkshire Lias (1876), in which the life-history of the strata was first worked out in detail.

In 1875 Tate was appointed Elder Professor of natural science at the University of Adelaide in South Australia, teaching botany, zoology and geology. He became vice-president and then as president (1878–1879) of the Adelaide Philosophical Society, which changed its name to the Royal Society of South Australia in 1880, with Tate as its first president in that year, as well as in 1891–1894. Tate, as editor of the RSSA's Transactions and Proceedings (1889–1901), encouraged members to send in original papers, and personally contributed nearly 100 papers.

In 1882 Tate first travelled to the Northern Territory. In 1883 he became a fellow of the Linnean Society, and in 1888 he was a founding member of the Australasian Association for the Advancement of Science, as well as becoming president of the AAAS's biological section. Tate was president of the AAAS in 1892–1893. He was also in 1893 elected a foundation vice-president of the Australasian Institute of Mining Engineers.

Tate gave special attention to the Recent and Tertiary mollusca of Australia, and discovered evidence of Permian glaciation of southern Australia at Hallett Cove.

== Recognition ==
- Tate was awarded the Clarke Medal by the Royal Society of New South Wales in 1893.
- The Tate Museum, opened in 1902 in the University of Adelaide's Mawson Building, was named in his honour.
- The Tate Medal was established in 1903 by the University of Adelaide.
- The Ralph Tate Society of the University of Adelaide was formed in 1938 to promote original research in natural history by field excursions, similar to the McCoy Society of the University of Melbourne.

== See also ==
- Tietkens expedition of 1889

== Notes ==
Awards
Preceded by William Turner Thiselton-Dyer	Clarke Medal; 1893	Succeeded by Robert Logan Jack and Robert Etheridge, Jr.
