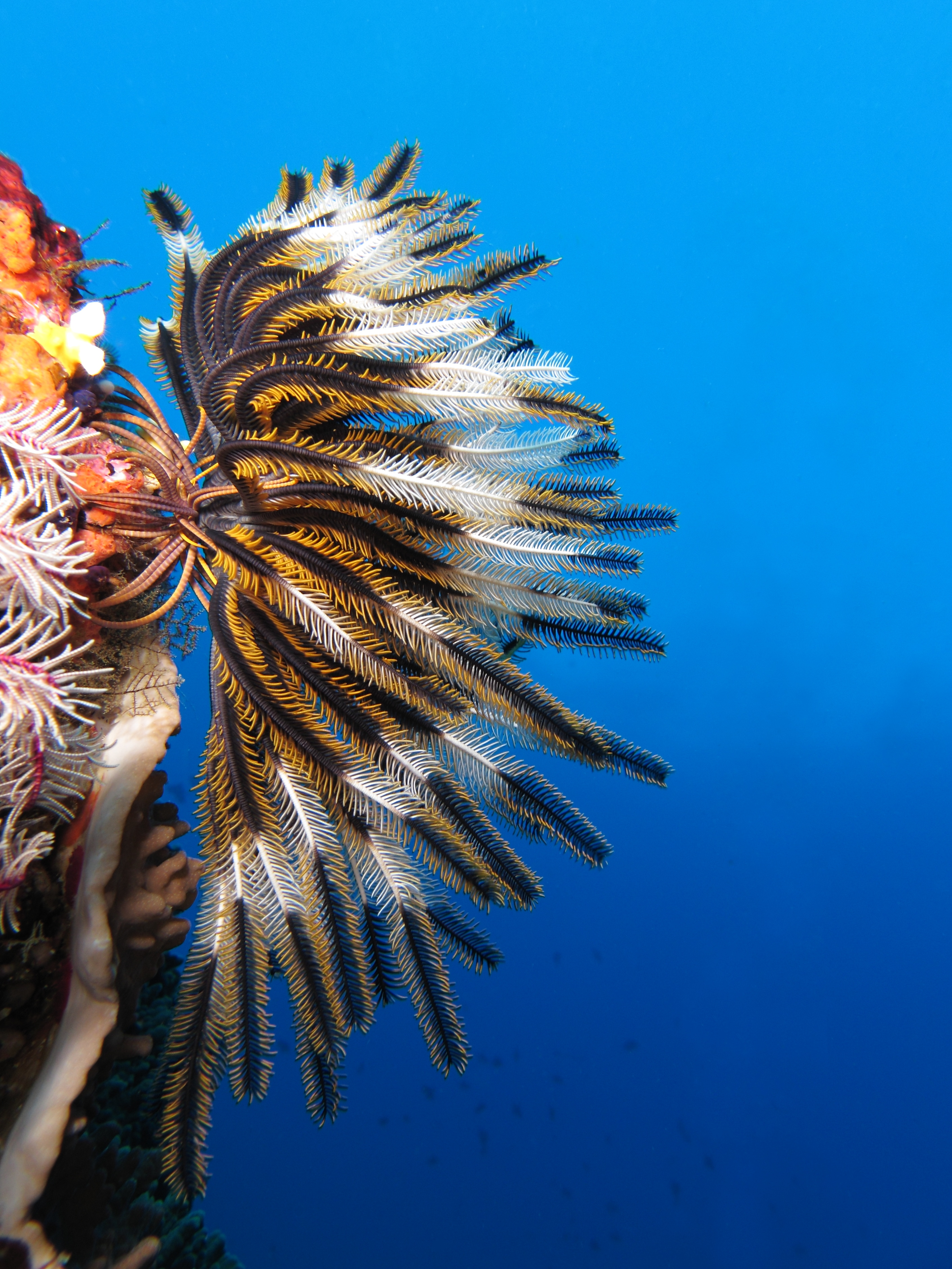
- Crinoid on the reef of Batu Moncho Island, Indonesia

Scientific classification
- Kingdom: Animalia
- Phylum: Echinodermata
- Subphylum: Crinozoa
- Class: Crinoidea; Miller, 1821

Subclasses
- †Camerata; Pentacrinoidea

Diversity
- ~580 species

= Crinoid =

Crinoids Temporal range: Early Ordovician (middle Tremadocian)–Present

Class of echinoderms

Crinoids are marine invertebrates that make up the class Crinoidea. Crinoids that remain attached to the sea floor by a stalk in their adult form are commonly called sea lilies, while the unstalked forms, called feather stars or comatulids, are members of the largest crinoid order, Comatulida. Crinoids are echinoderms in the phylum Echinodermata, which also includes the starfish, brittle stars, sea urchins, and sea cucumbers. They live in both shallow water and at depths over 9,000 m (30,000 ft).

Adult crinoids are characterised by having their mouths located on their upper surface. This is surrounded by feeding arms and is linked to a U-shaped gut, with the anus being located on the oral disc near the mouth. Although the basic echinoderm pattern of five-fold symmetry can be recognised in most crinoids, the five arms are subdivided into 10 or more. These have feathery pinnules and are spread wide to gather planktonic particles from the water. At some stage in their lives, most crinoids have a short stem used to attach themselves to the substrate, but many live attached only as juveniles and become free-swimming as adults.

Only about 700 living species of crinoids are known, but the class was much more abundant and diverse in the past. Some thick limestone beds dating to the mid-Paleozoic era to Jurassic period are composed almost entirely of disarticulated crinoid fragments.

== Etymology ==
The name "Crinoidea" comes from the Ancient Greek word κρίνον (krínon), "a lily", with the suffix –oid meaning "like".

== Morphology ==
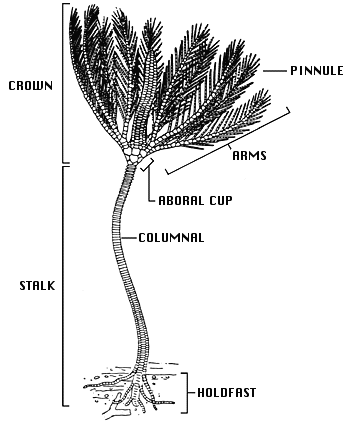
Anatomy of a stalked crinoid

The basic body form of a crinoid is a stem (not present in adult feather stars) and a crown consisting of a cup-like central body known as the theca, and a set of five rays or arms, usually branched and feathery. The mouth and anus are both located on the upper side of the theca, making the dorsal (upper) surface the oral surface, unlike in the other echinoderm groups such as the sea urchins, starfish, and brittle stars, where the mouth is on the underside. Numerous calcareous plates make up the bulk of the crinoid, with only a small percentage of soft tissue. These ossicles fossilize well and some beds of limestone date from the Lower Carboniferous around Clitheroe, England, formed almost exclusively from a diverse fauna of crinoid fossils.

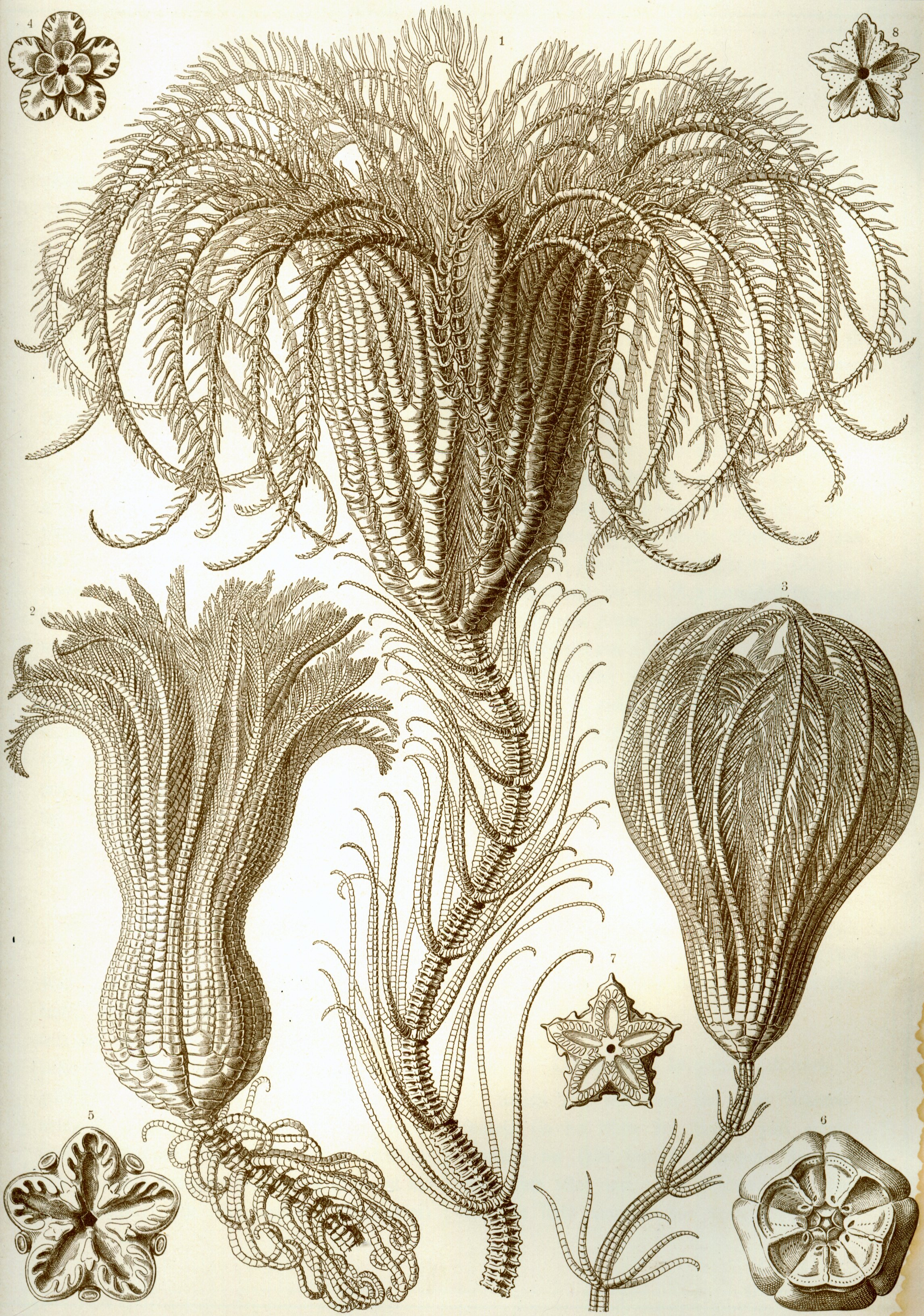
Stalked crinoid drawn by Ernst Haeckel

The stem of sea lilies is composed of a column of highly porous ossicles, which are connected by ligamentary tissue. It attaches to the substrate with a flattened holdfast or with whorls of jointed, root-like structures known as cirri. Further cirri may occur higher up the stem. In crinoids that attach to hard surfaces, the cirri may be robust and curved, resembling birds' feet, but when crinoids live on soft sediment, the cirri may be slender and rod-like. Juvenile feather stars have a stem, but this is later lost, with many species retaining a few cirri at the base of the crown. Most living crinoids are free-swimming and have only a vestigial stalk. In those deep-sea species that still retain a stalk, it may reach up to 1 m (3 ft) in length (although usually much smaller), and fossil species are known with 20 m (66 ft) stems.

The theca is pentamerous (has five-part symmetry) and is homologous with the body or disc of other echinoderms. The base of the theca is formed from a cup-shaped set of ossicles (bony plates), the calyx, while the upper surface is formed by the weakly calcified tegmen, a membranous disc. The tegmen is divided into five "ambulacral areas", including a deep groove from which the tube feet project, and five "interambulacral areas" between them. The mouth is near the centre or on the margin of the tegmen, and ambulacral grooves lead from the base of the arms to the mouth. The anus is also located on the tegmen, often on a small, elevated cone, in an interambulacral area. The theca is relatively small and contains the crinoid's digestive organs.

The arms are supported by a series of articulating ossicles similar to those in the stalk. Primitively, crinoids had only five arms, but in most modern forms, these are divided into two at ossicle II, giving 10 arms in total. In most living species, especially the free-swimming feather stars, the arms branch several more times, producing up to 200 branches in total. Being jointed, the arms can curl up. They are lined, on either side alternately, by smaller jointed appendages known as "pinnules", which give them their feather-like appearance. Both arms and pinnules have tube feet along the margins of the ambulacral grooves. The tube feet occur in groups of three of different sizes; they have no suction pads and are used to hold and manipulate food particles. The grooves are equipped with cilia that facilitate feeding by moving the organic particles along the arm and into the mouth.

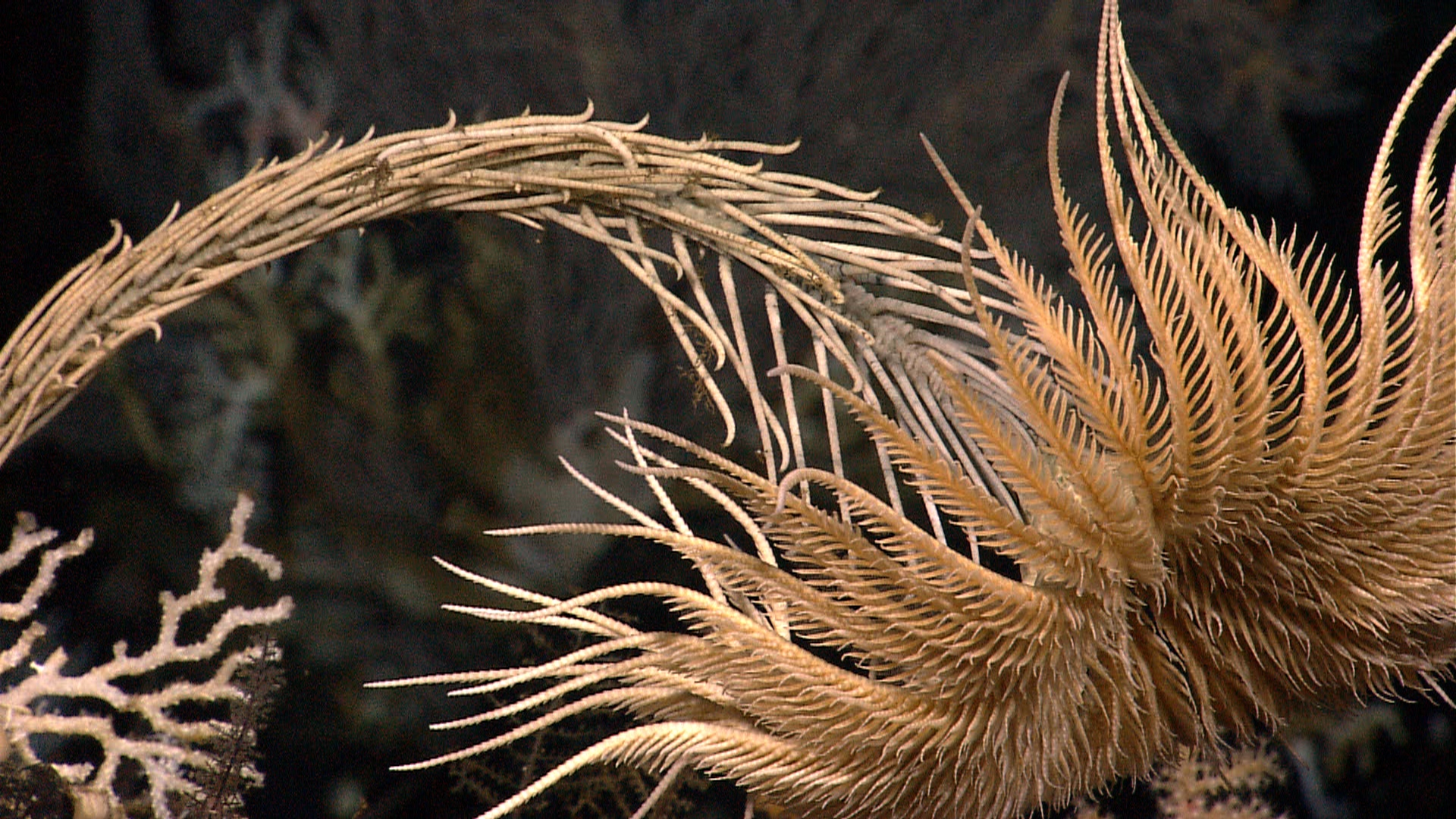
Stem, theca and arms of a "true" (stalked) crinoid (family Isselicrinidae)

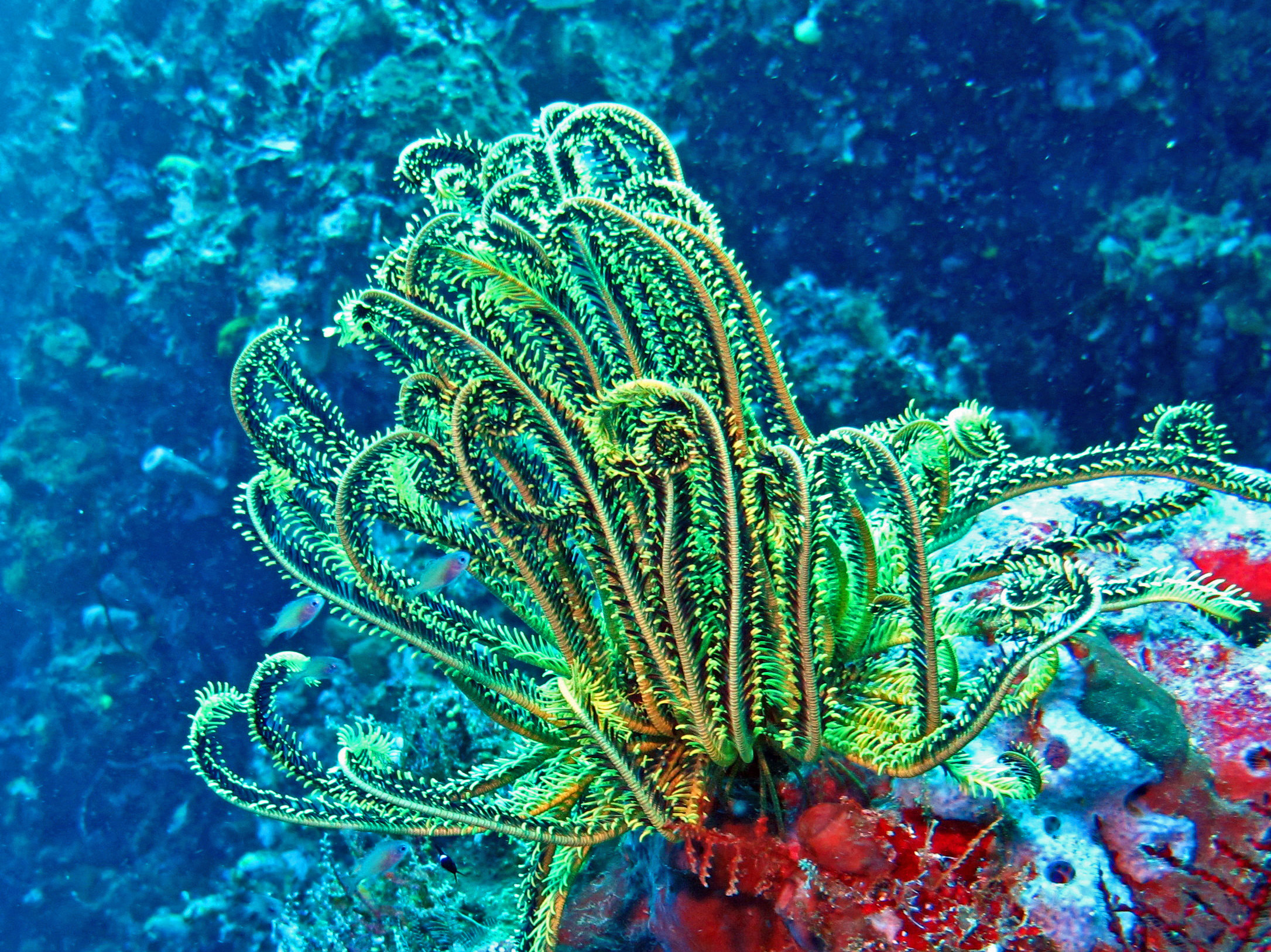
Oxycomanthus bennetti (comatulid)

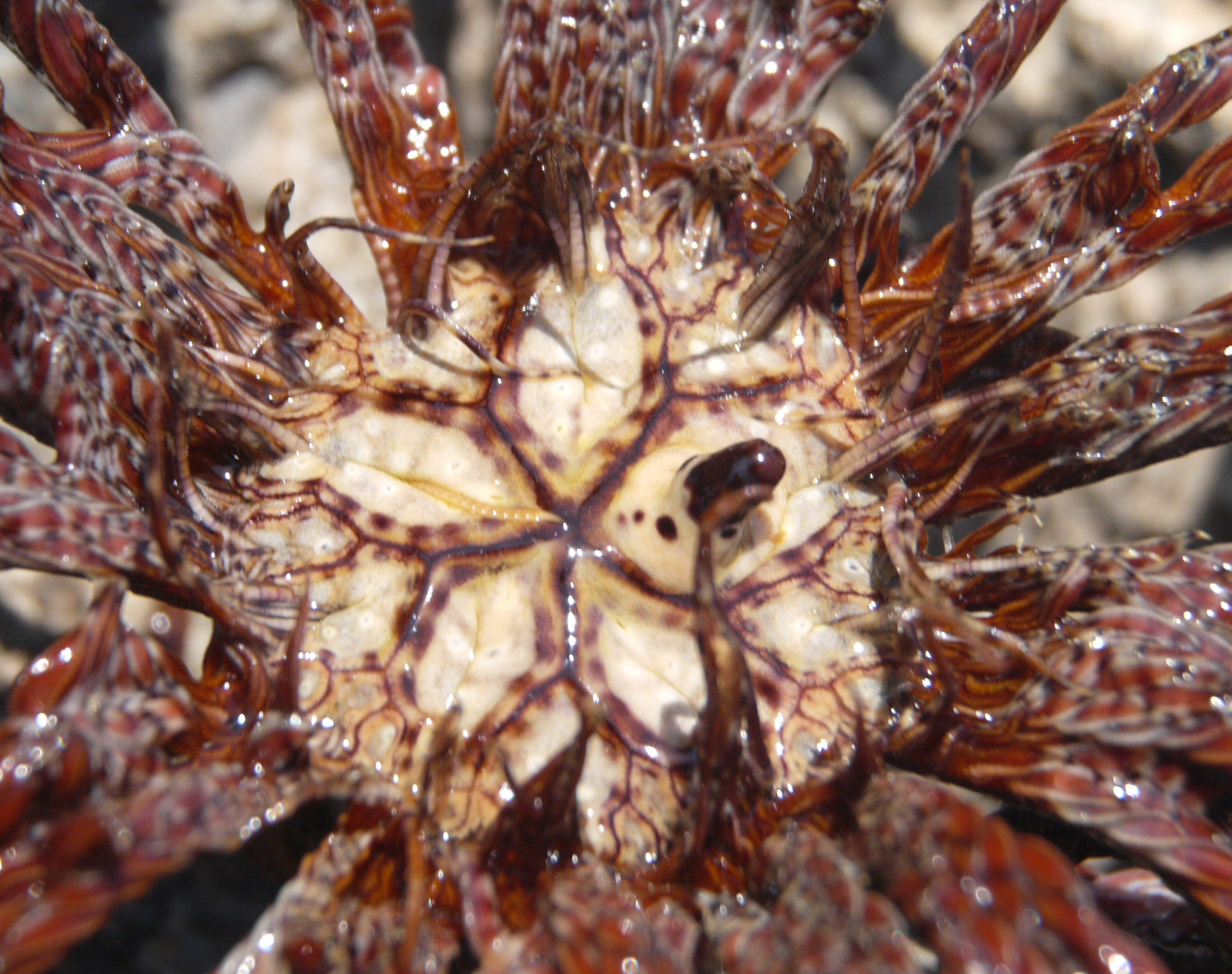
Tegmen of a Lamprometra palmata: The mouth is located at the center of the 5 feeding grooves, and the anus at the top of the column.

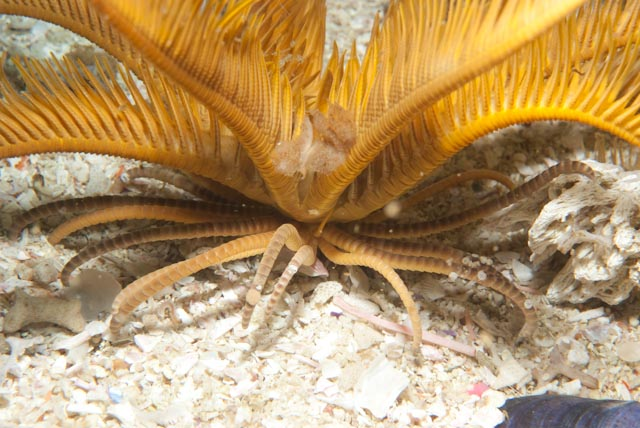
Close-up on the cirri that allow comatulids to walk and attach themselves

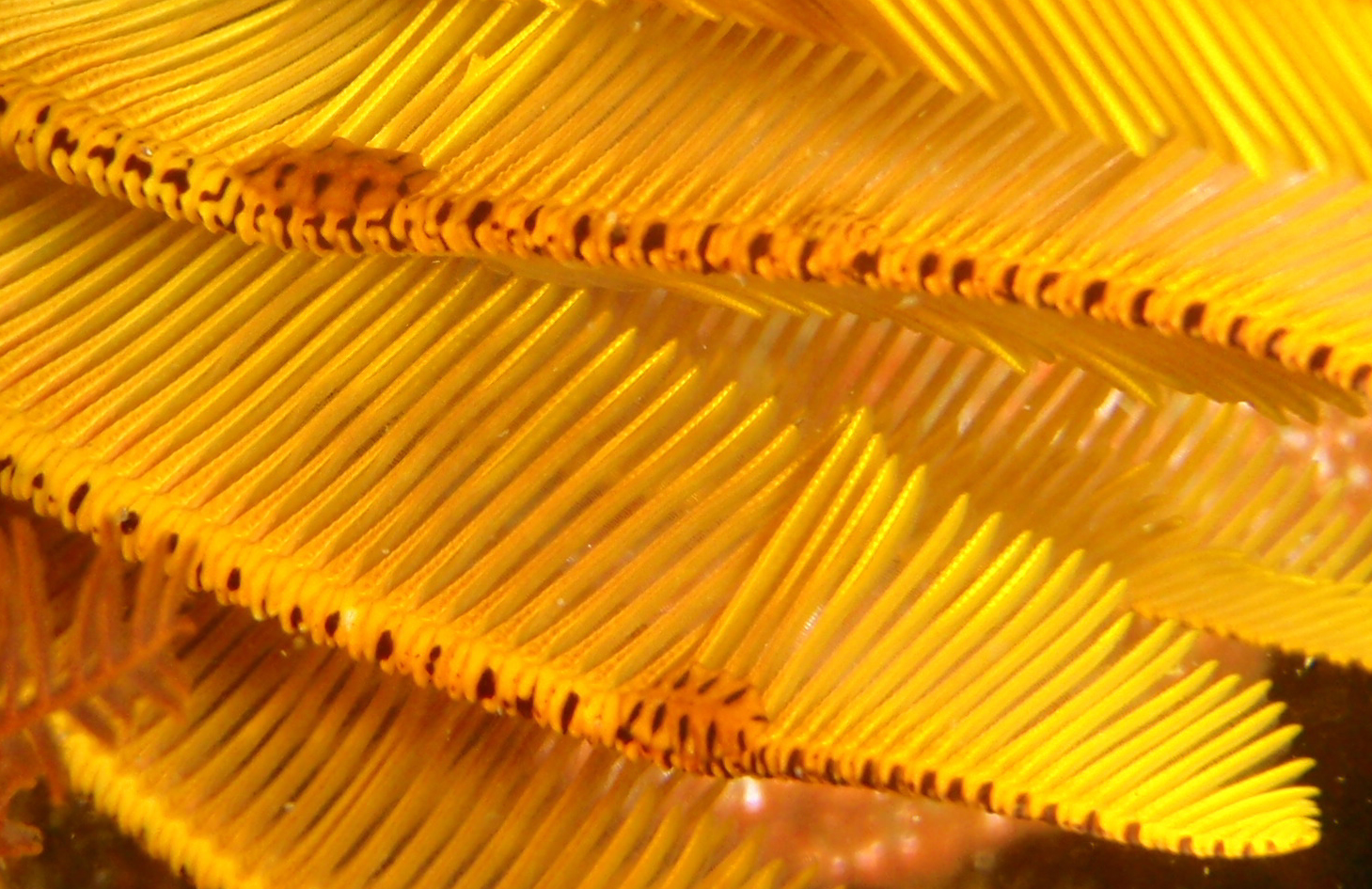
Close-up on the pinnules of a Tropiometra carinata (with parasites Myzostoma fuscomaculatum)

=== Feeding ===
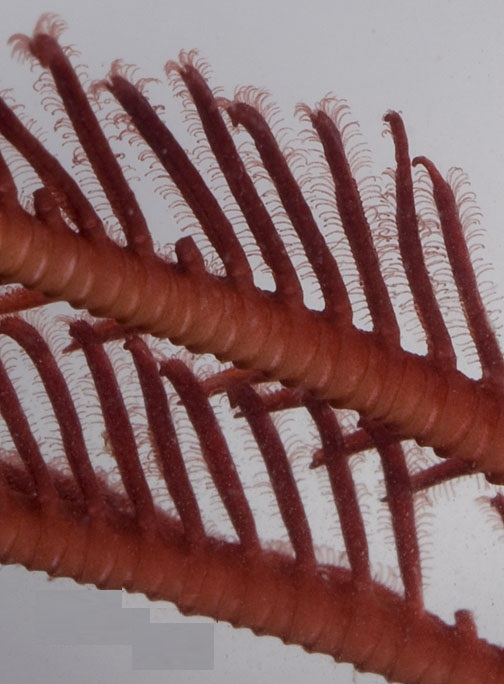
Two arms with pinnules and tube feet outstretched

Crinoids are passive suspension feeders, filtering plankton and small particles of detritus from the sea water flowing past them with their feather-like arms. The arms are raised to form a fan shape, which is held perpendicular to the current. Mobile crinoids move to perch on rocks, coral heads, or other eminences to maximise their feeding opportunities. The food particles are caught by the primary (longest) tube feet, which are fully extended and held erect from the pinnules, forming a food-trapping mesh, while the secondary and tertiary tube feet are involved in manipulating any encountered food.

The tube feet are covered with sticky mucus that traps any particles that come in contact. Once they have caught a particle of food, the tube feet flick it into the ambulacral groove, where the cilia propel the mucus and food particles towards the mouth. Lappets at the side of the groove help keep the mucus stream in place. The total length of the food-trapping surface may be very large; the 56 arms of a Japanese sea lily, with 24 cm (9 in) arms, have a total length of 80 m (260 ft) including the pinnules. Generally speaking, crinoids living in environments with relatively little plankton have longer and more highly branched arms than those living in food-rich environments.

The mouth descends into a short oesophagus. With no true stomach, the oesophagus connects directly to the intestine, which runs in a single loop right around the inside of the calyx. The intestine often includes numerous diverticulae, some of which may be long or branched. The end of the intestine opens into a short, muscular rectum. This ascends towards the anus, which projects from a small, conical protuberance at the edge of the tegmen. Faecal matter is formed into large, mucous-cemented pellets, which fall onto the tegmen and thence the substrate.

=== Predation ===
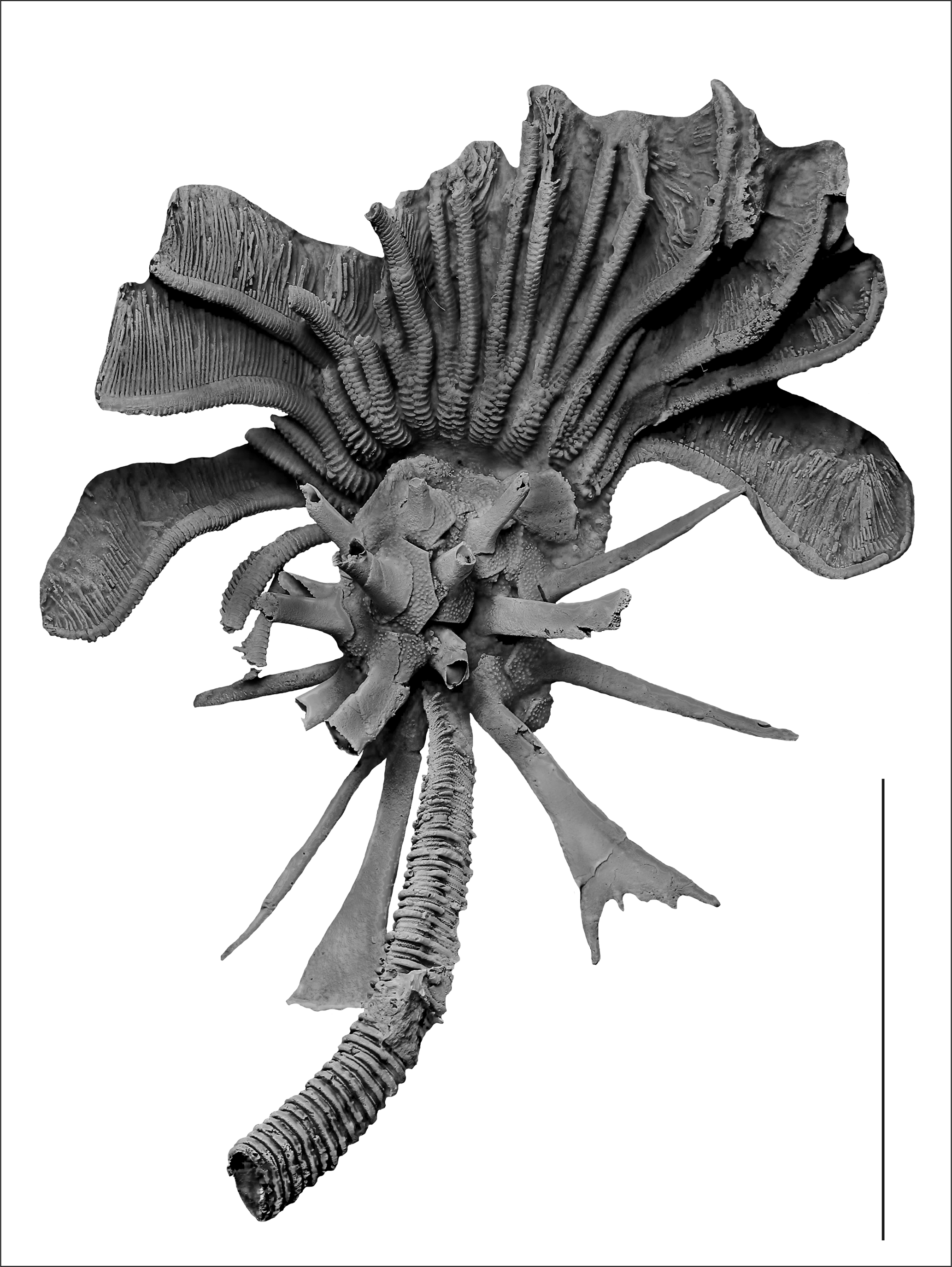
Some extinct crinoids, like Monstrocrinus from the Early to Middle Devonian, could bear arrangements of complex spines attached to calyx plates

Specimens of the sea urchin Calocidaris micans found in the vicinity of the crinoid Endoxocrinus parrae have been shown to contain large quantities of stem portions in their guts. These consist of articulated ossicles with soft tissue, whereas the local sediment contained only disarticulated ossicles without soft tissue. These sea urchins very likely are predators of the crinoids, and the crinoids flee, offering part of their stem in the process.

Various crinoid fossils hint at possible prehistoric predators. Coprolites of both fish and cephalopods have been found containing ossicles of various crinoids, such as the pelagic crinoid Saccocoma, from the Jurassic lagerstatten Solnhofen, while damaged crinoid stems with bite marks matching the toothplates of coccosteid placoderms have been found in Late Devonian Poland. The calyxes of several Devonian to Carboniferous-aged crinoids have the shells of a snail, Platyceras, intimately associated with them. Some have the snail situated over the anus, suggesting that Platyceras was a coprophagous commensal, while others have the animal directly situated over a borehole, suggesting a more pernicious relationship.

=== Water vascular system ===
Like other echinoderms, crinoids possess a water vascular system that maintains hydraulic pressure in the tube feet. This is not connected to external sea water via a madreporite, as in other echinoderms, but only connected through a large number of pores to the coelom (body cavity). The main fluid reservoir is the muscular-walled ring canal that is connected to the coelom by stone canals lined with calcareous material. The coelom is divided into a number of interconnecting spaces by mesenteries. It surrounds the viscera in the disc and has branches within the stalk and arms, with smaller branches extending into the pinnules. It is the contraction of the ring canal that extends the tube feet. Three narrow branches of the coelom enter each arm, two on the oral side and one aborally, and pinnules. The action of cilia cause a slow flow of fluid (1 mm per second) in these canals, outward in the oral branches and inward in the aboral ones, and this is the main means of transport of nutrients and waste products. They have no heart and separate circulatory system, but a large blood vessel known as the axial organ at the base of the disc contains some slender, blind-ended tubes of unknown function, which extend into the stalk.

These various fluid-filled spaces, in addition to transporting nutrients around the body, also function as both a respiratory and an excretory system. Oxygen is absorbed primarily through the tube feet, which are the most thin-walled parts of the body, with further gas exchange taking place over the large surface area of the arms. No specialised organs exist for excretion, while waste is collected by phagocytic coelomocytes.

=== Nervous system ===
The crinoid nervous system is divided into three parts, with numerous connections between them. The oral or uppermost portion is the only one homologous with the nervous systems of other echinoderms. It consists of a central nerve ring surrounding the mouth, and radial nerves branching into the arms and is sensory in function. Below this lies an intermediate nerve ring, giving off radial nerves supplying the arms and pinnules. These nerves are motor in nature, and control the musculature of the tube feet. The third portion of the nervous system lies aborally and is responsible for the flexing and movement actions of the arms, pinnules, and cirri. This is centred on a mass of neural tissue near the base of the calyx and provides a single nerve to each arm and a number of nerves to the stalk.

=== Reproduction and lifecycle ===
Crinoids are dioecious, with individuals being either male or female. In most species, the gonads are located in the pinnules, but in a few, they are located in the arms. Not all the pinnules are reproductive, just those closest to the crown. The gametes are produced in genital canals enclosed in genital coeloms. The pinnules eventually rupture to release the sperm and eggs into the surrounding sea water. In certain genera, such as Antedon, the fertilised eggs are cemented to the arms with secretions from epidermal glands; in others, especially cold-water species from Antarctica, the eggs are brooded in specialised sacs on the arms or pinnules.

The fertilised eggs hatch to release free-swimming vitellaria larvae. The bilaterally symmetrical larva is barrel-shaped with rings of cilia running round the body and a tuft of sensory hairs at the upper pole. While both feeding (planktotrophic) and nonfeeding (lecithotrophic) larvae exist among the four other extant echinoderm classes, all present-day crinoids appear to be descendants from a surviving clade that went through a bottleneck after the Permian extinction, at that time losing the feeding larval stage. The larva's free-swimming period lasts for only a few days before it settles on the bottom and attaches itself to the underlying surface using an adhesive gland on its underside. The larva then undergoes an extended period of metamorphoses into a stalked juvenile, becoming radially symmetric in the process. Even the free-swimming feather stars go through this stage, with the adult eventually breaking away from the stalk.

==== Regeneration ====
Crinoids are not capable of clonal reproduction as are some starfish and brittle stars, but are capable of regenerating lost body parts. Arms torn off by predators or damaged by adverse environmental conditions can regrow, and even the visceral mass can regenerate over the course of a few weeks. The stalk's uppermost segment and the basal plates have the capacity to regenerate the entire crown. Nutrients and other components from the stalk, especially the upper 5 cm, are used in crown regeneration.

Crinoids have been able to regenerate parts since Paleozoic times. These regenerative abilities may be vital in surviving attacks by predatory fish.

== Locomotion ==
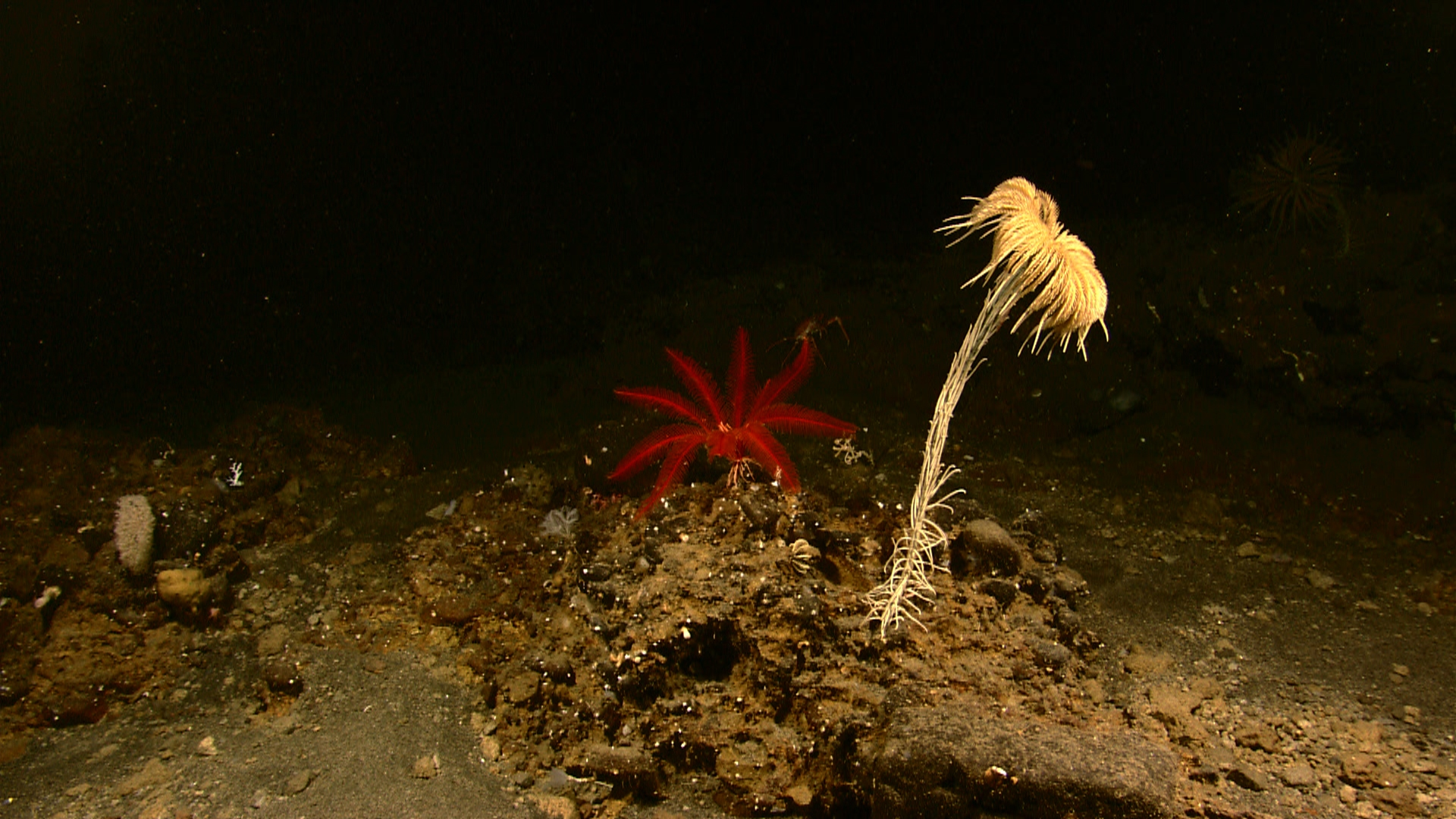
A stalked crinoid (white) and a comatulid (red) in deep sea, showing the differences between these two sister groups

Most modern crinoids, i.e., the feather stars, are free-moving and lack a stem as adults. Examples of fossil crinoids that have been interpreted as free-swimming include Marsupites, Saccocoma, and Uintacrinus. In general, crinoids move to new locations by crawling, using the feather-like arms to heft the body. Such a movement may be induced in relation to a change in current direction, the need to climb to an elevated perch to feed, or because of an agonistic behaviour by an encountered individual. Crinoids can also swim. They do this by co-ordinated, repeated, sequential movements of the arms in three groups. At first, the direction of travel is upward, but soon becomes horizontal, travelling around 7 cm (2.8 in) per second with the oral surface in front. Swimming usually takes place as short bursts of activity lasting up to half a minute, and in the comatulid Florometra serratissima at least, only takes place after mechanical stimulation or as an escape response evoked by a predator.

In 2005, a stalked crinoid, Neocrinus decorus, was recorded pulling itself along the sea floor off the Grand Bahama Island. While stalked crinoids were known to move, before this recording, the fastest motion known for a stalked crinoid was 0.6 m (2 ft) per hour. The 2005 recording showed one of these moving across the seabed at the much faster rate of 4 to 5 cm (1.6 to 2.0 in) per second, or 144 to 180 m (472 to 591 ft) per hour.

== Evolution ==
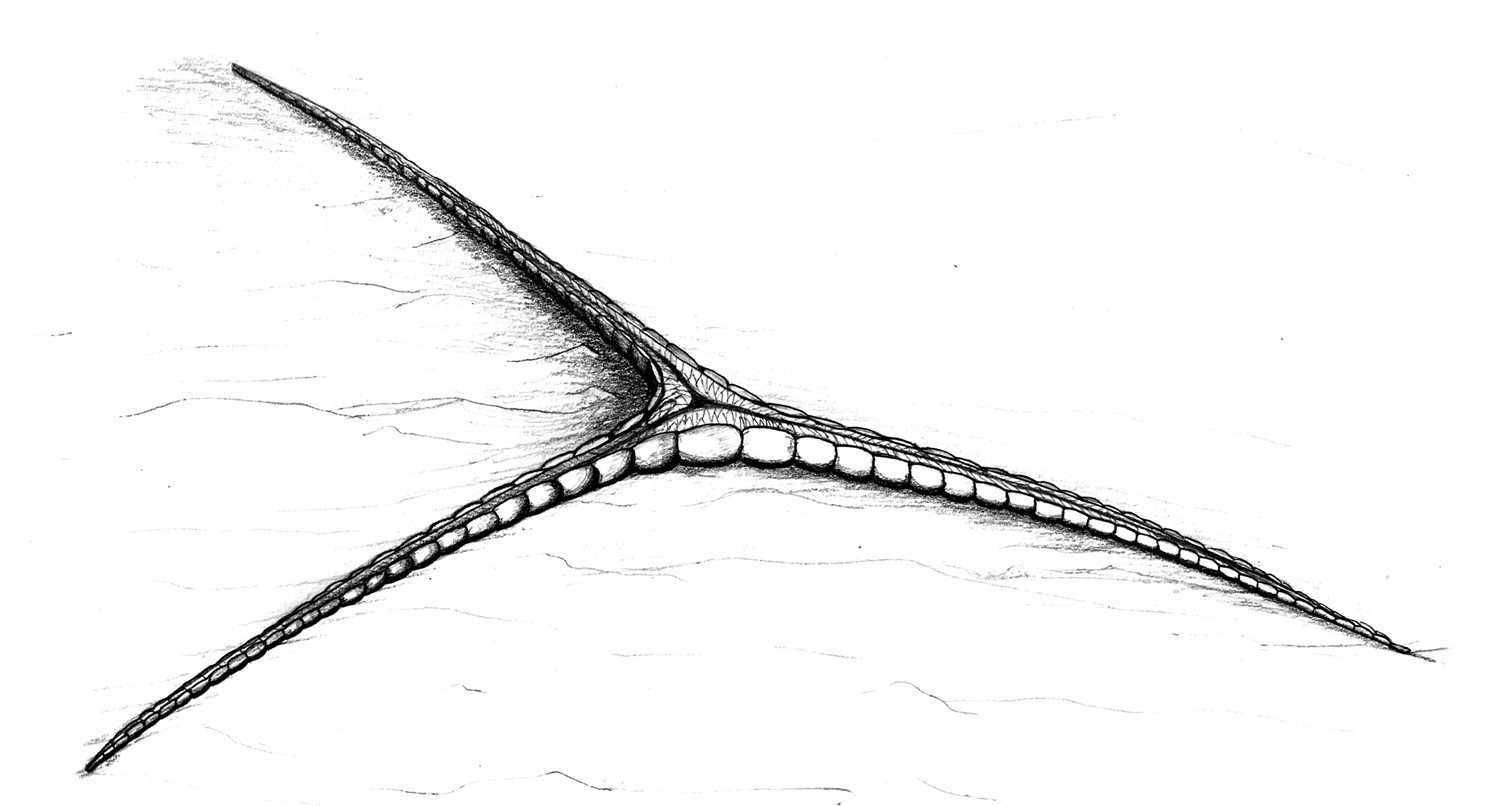
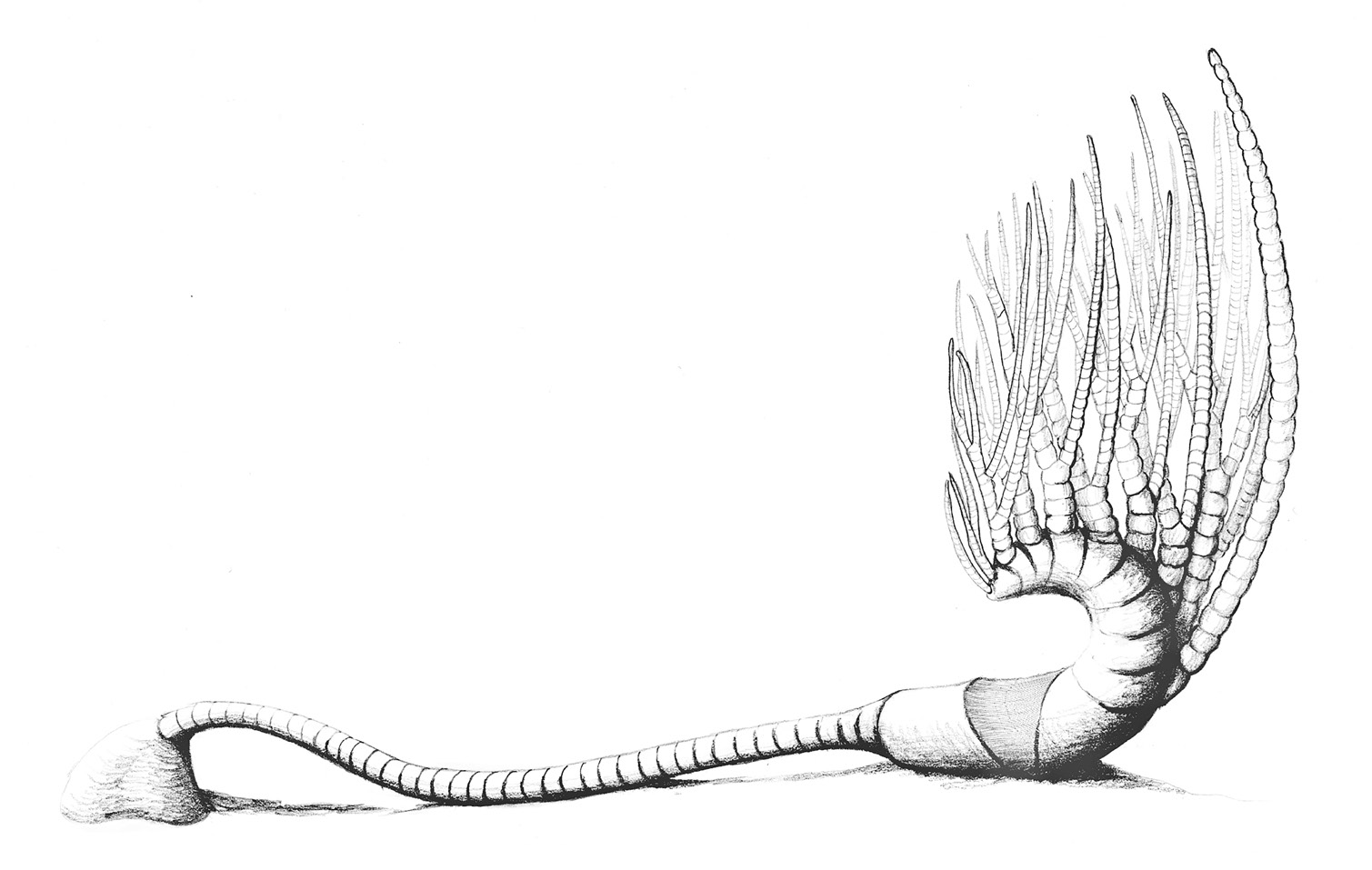
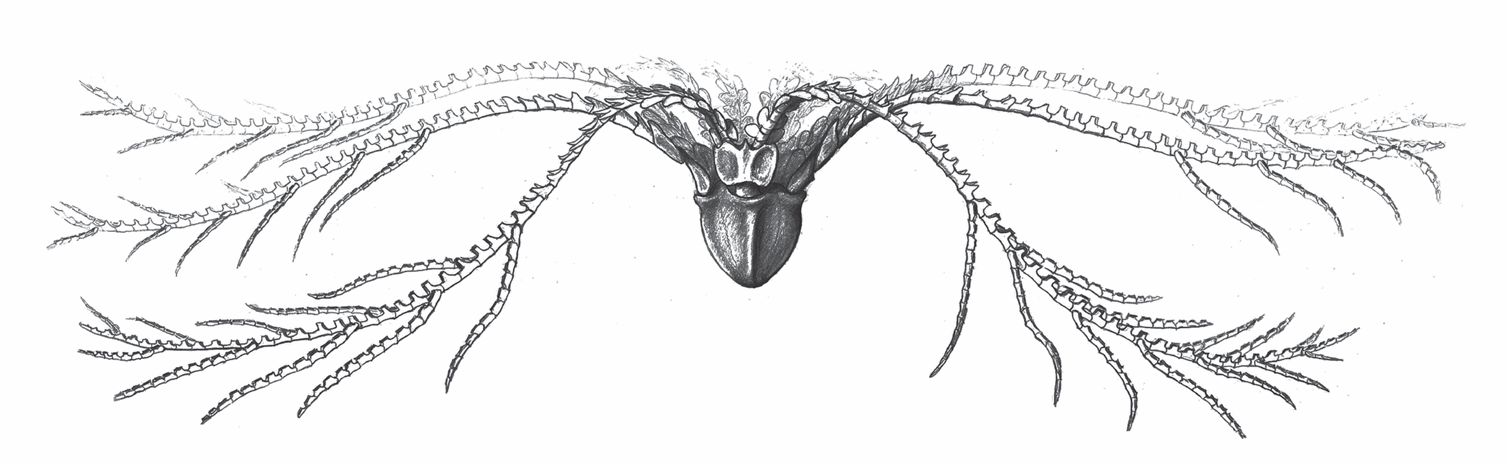
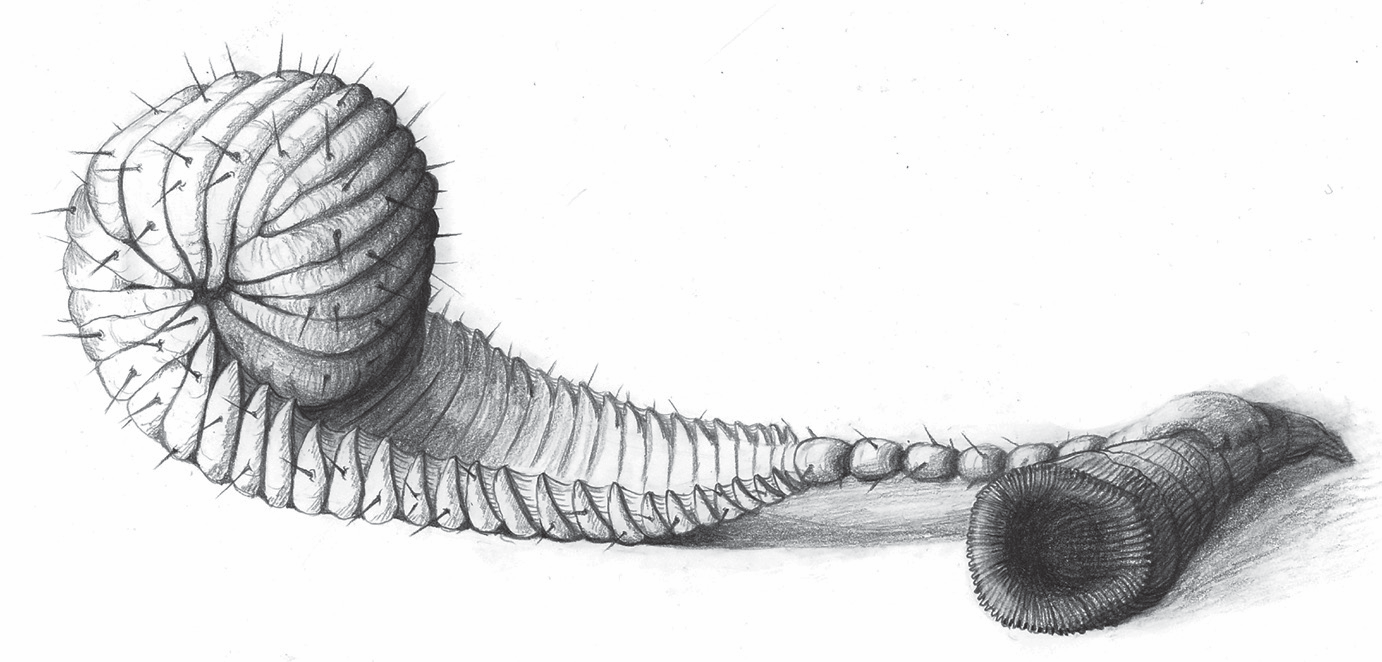
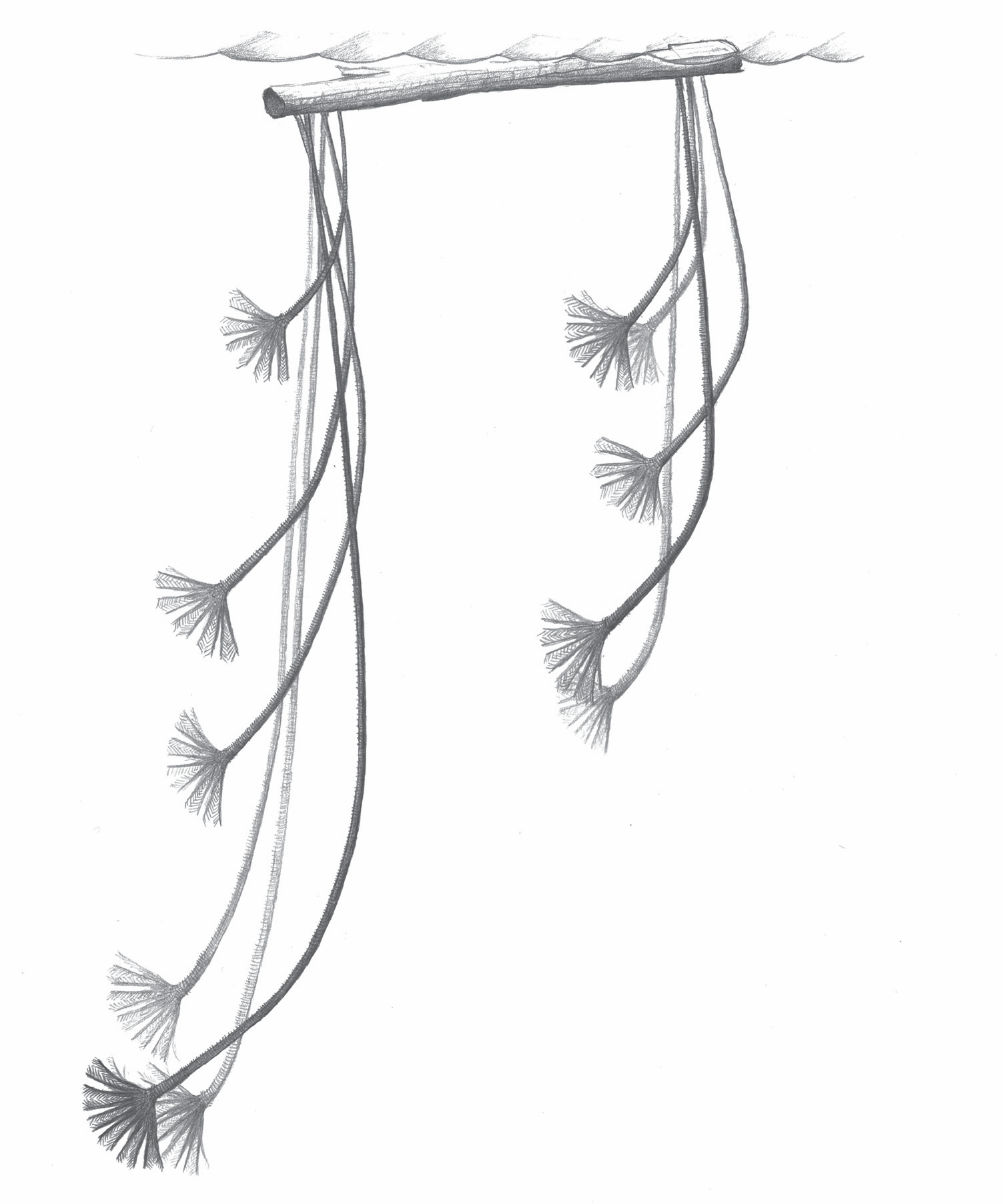
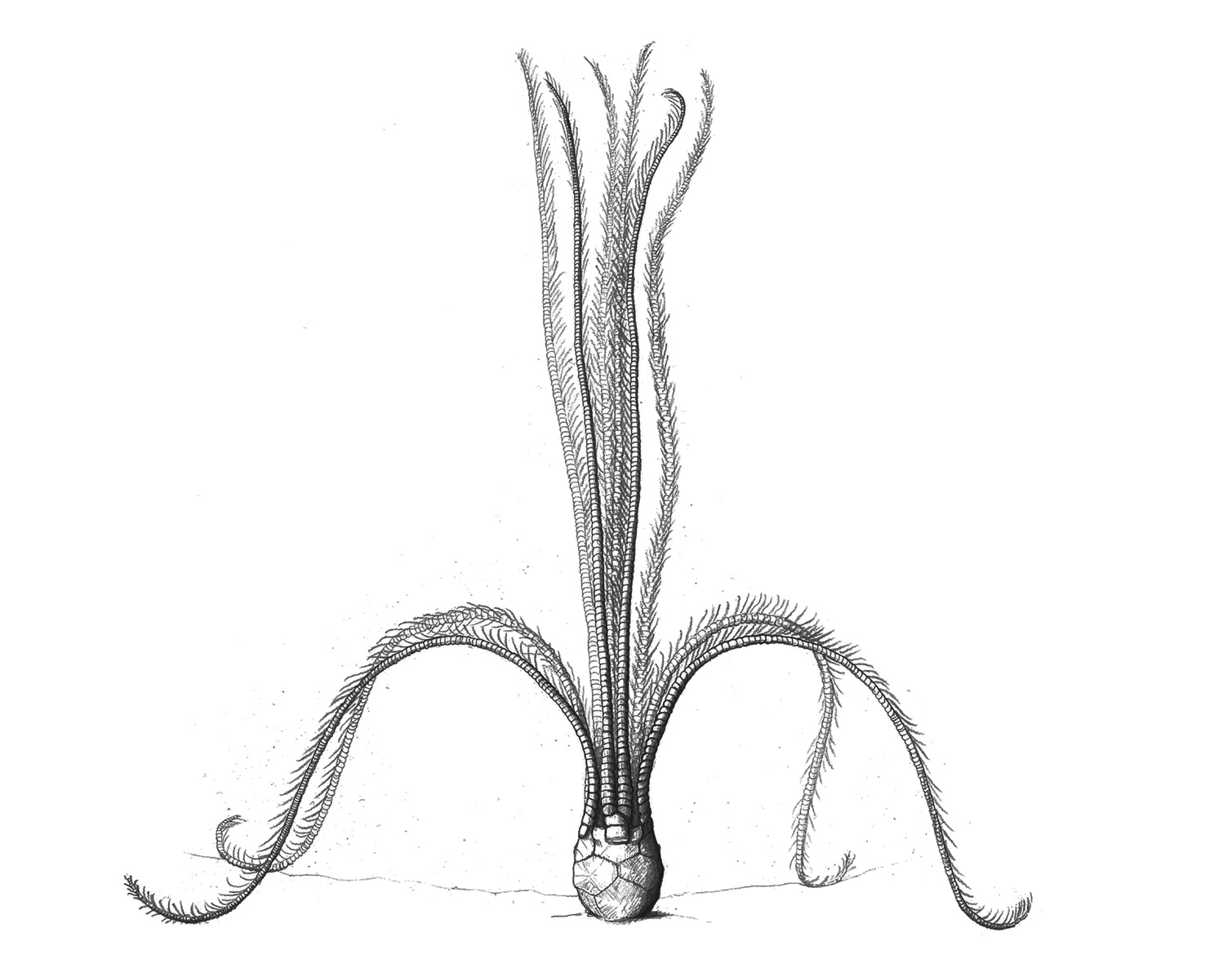
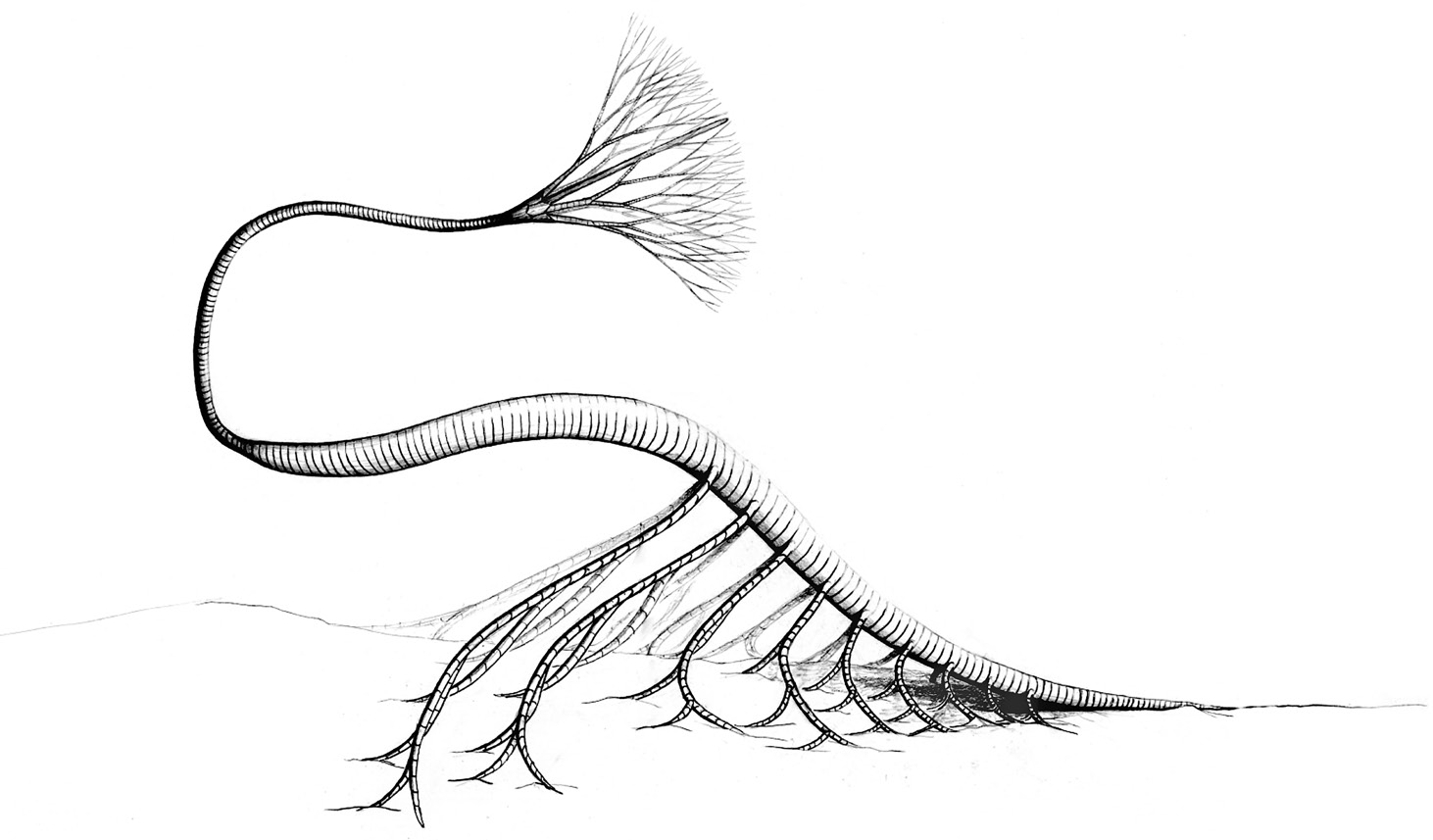
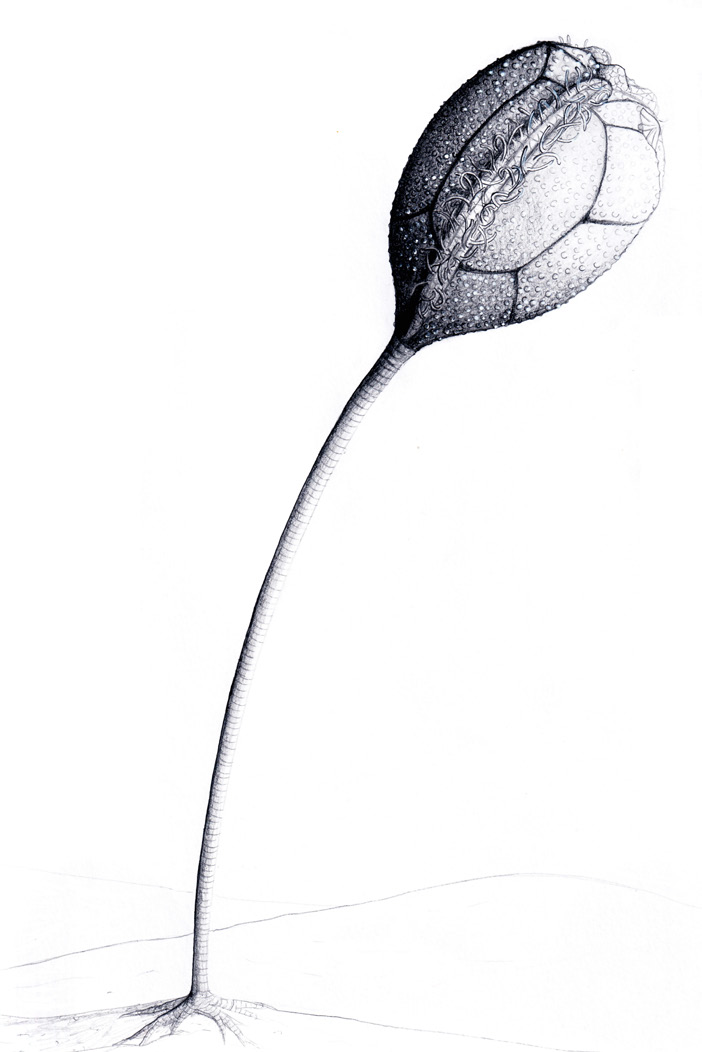
Reconstructions of various extinct morphologically derived crinoids. From left to right in each row, from top to bottom: Trecrinus schmidti, a calceocrinid, a roveacrinid, an ammonicrinid, traumatocrinids, Marsupites, Crinobrachiatus brachiatus, and Tripatocrinus

=== Origins ===
If one ignores the enigmatic Echmatocrinus of the Burgess Shale, the earliest known unequivocal crinoid groups date back to the Ordovician, 480 million years ago. Two competing hypotheses pertain to the origin of the group; the traditional viewpoint holds that crinoids evolved from within the blastozoans (the eocrinoids and their derived descendants, the blastoids and the cystoids), whereas the most popular alternative suggests that the crinoids split early from among the edrioasteroids. The debate is difficult to settle, in part because all three candidate ancestors share many characteristics, including radial symmetry, calcareous plates, and stalked or direct attachment to the substrate.

Recent research has found weak support for the recovery of Camptostroma as the sister group of the crinoids. However, other phylogenies are ambiguous regarding whether it is closer to the crinoids, eocrinoids, or eleutherozoans.

=== Diversity ===
Echinoderms with mineralized skeletons entered the fossil record in the early Cambrian (540 Mya), and during the next 100 million years, the crinoids and blastoids (also stalked filter-feeders) were dominant. At that time, the Echinodermata included 20 taxa of class rank, only five of which survived the mass extinction events that followed. The long and varied geological history of the crinoids demonstrates how well the echinoderms had adapted to filter-feeding.

The crinoids underwent two major episodes of abrupt adaptive radiation. The first occurred during the Ordovician (485 to 444 Mya) and was followed, much later in the Paleozoic, by a selective mass extinction at the end of the Permian period, during which all blastoids and most crinoids became extinct. After the end-Permian extinction, crinoids never regained the morphological diversity and dominant position they had enjoyed in the Paleozoic, instead adopting a different suite of ecological strategies from those that had proven so successful previously.

The second radiation occurred during the early Triassic (around 230 Mya), and resulted in forms with flexible arms becoming widespread. Motility—primarily a response to predation pressure—also became much more common than sessility. This radiation occurred somewhat earlier than the Mesozoic marine revolution, possibly because it was mainly driven by increases in benthic predation, particularly from echinoids. As predation by sea urchins intensified around 225 Mya, stalked crinoids gradually retreated to deeper waters, while motile forms retained stalks only during their early life stages.

=== Fossils ===
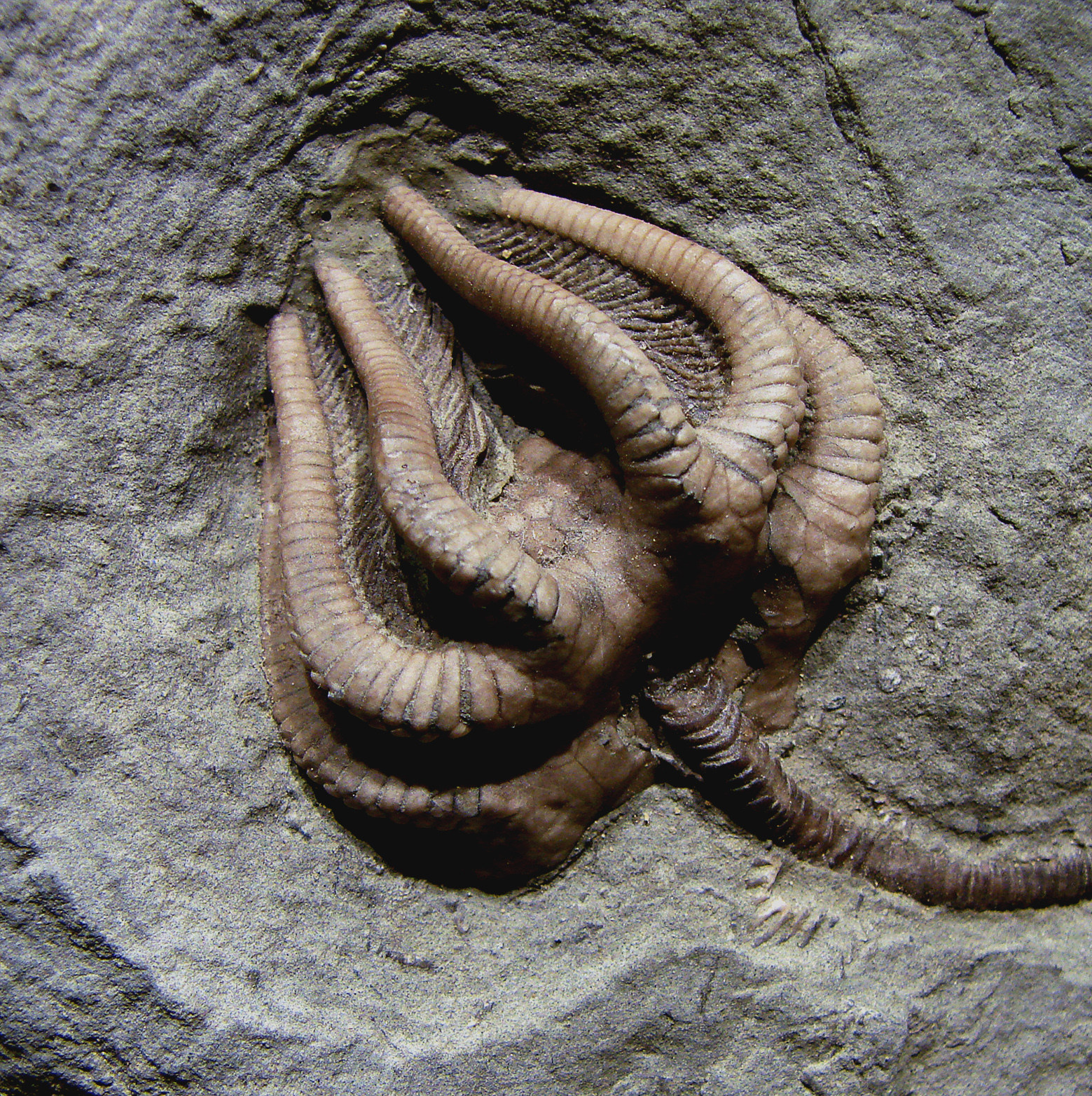
Agaricocrinus americanus, a fossil crinoid from the Carboniferous of Indiana

Some fossil crinoids, such as Pentacrinites, seem to have lived attached to floating driftwood and complete colonies are often found. Sometimes, this driftwood would become waterlogged and sink to the bottom, taking the attached crinoids with it. The stem of Pentacrinites can be several metres long. Modern relatives of Pentacrinites live in gentle currents attached to rocks by the end of their stem.

In 2012, three geologists reported they had isolated complex organic molecules from 340-million-year-old (Mississippian) fossils of multiple species of crinoids. Identified as "resembl[ing ...] aromatic or polyaromatic quinones", these are the oldest molecules to be definitively associated with particular individual fossils, as they are believed to have been sealed inside ossicle pores by precipitated calcite during the fossilization process.

Crinoid fossils, and in particular disarticulated crinoid columnals, can be so abundant that they at times serve as the primary supporting clasts in sedimentary rocks. Rocks of this nature are called encrinites.

== Taxonomy ==
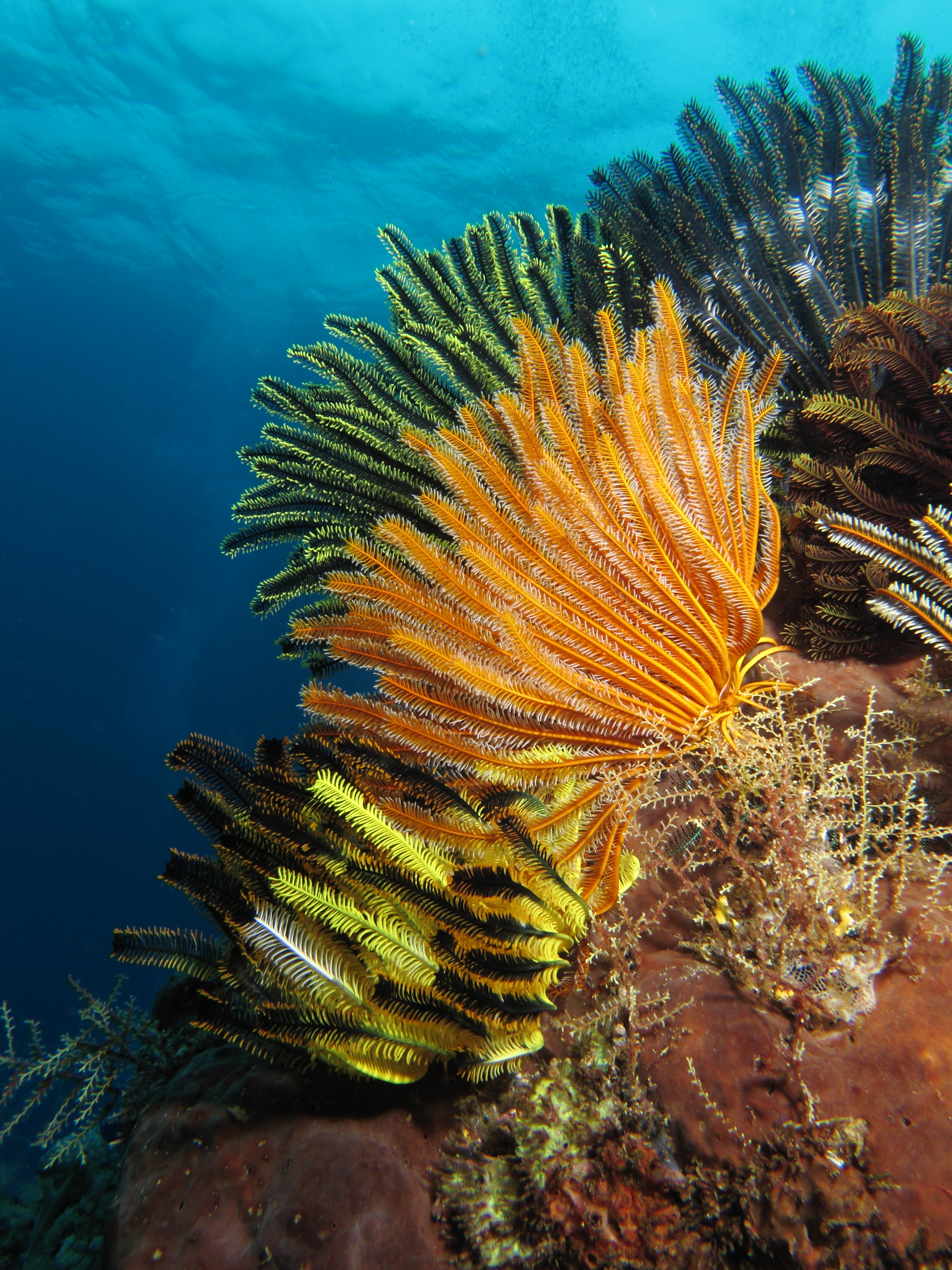
Colorful crinoids in shallow waters in Indonesia

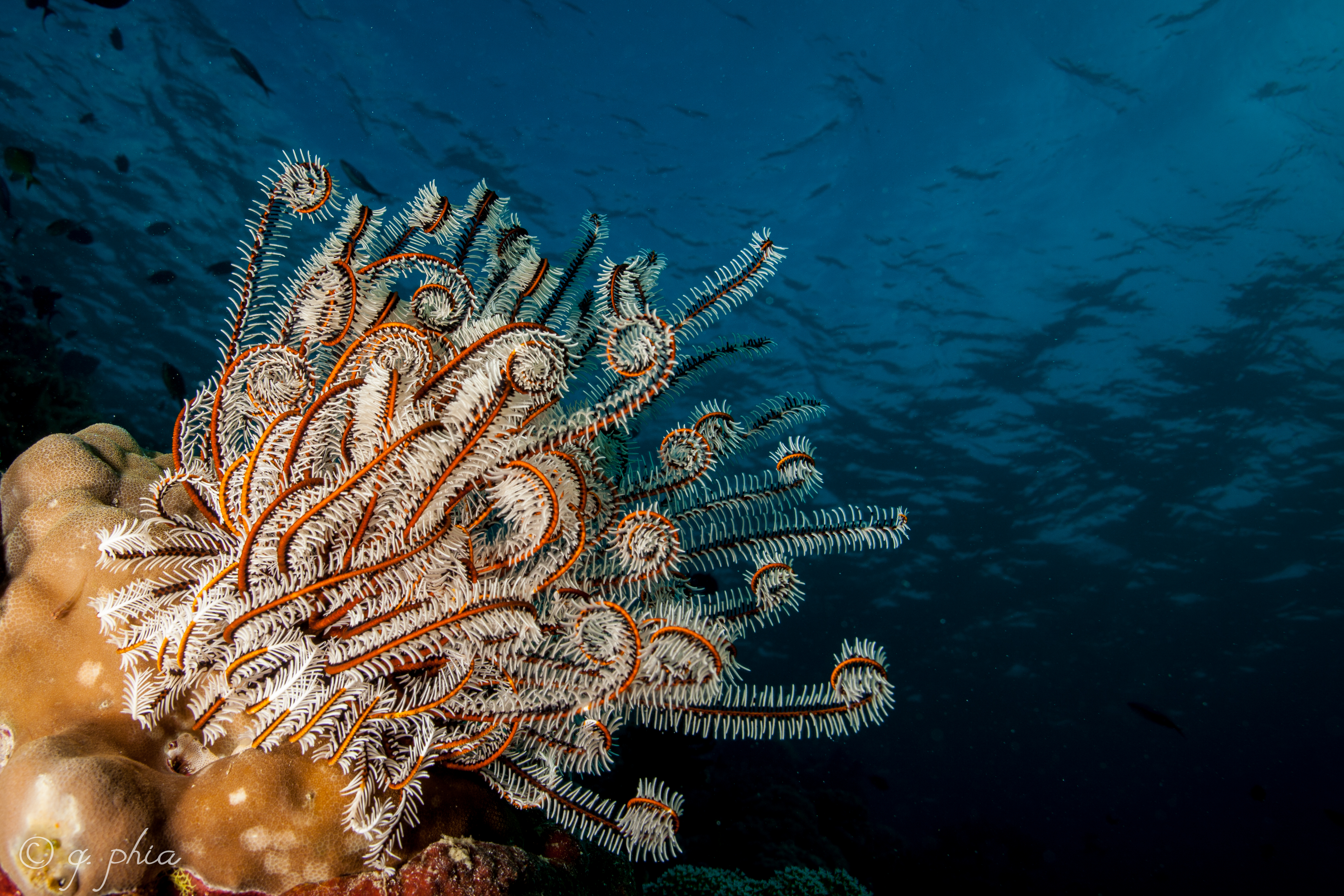
Crinoid at Wakatobi National Park, Indonesia

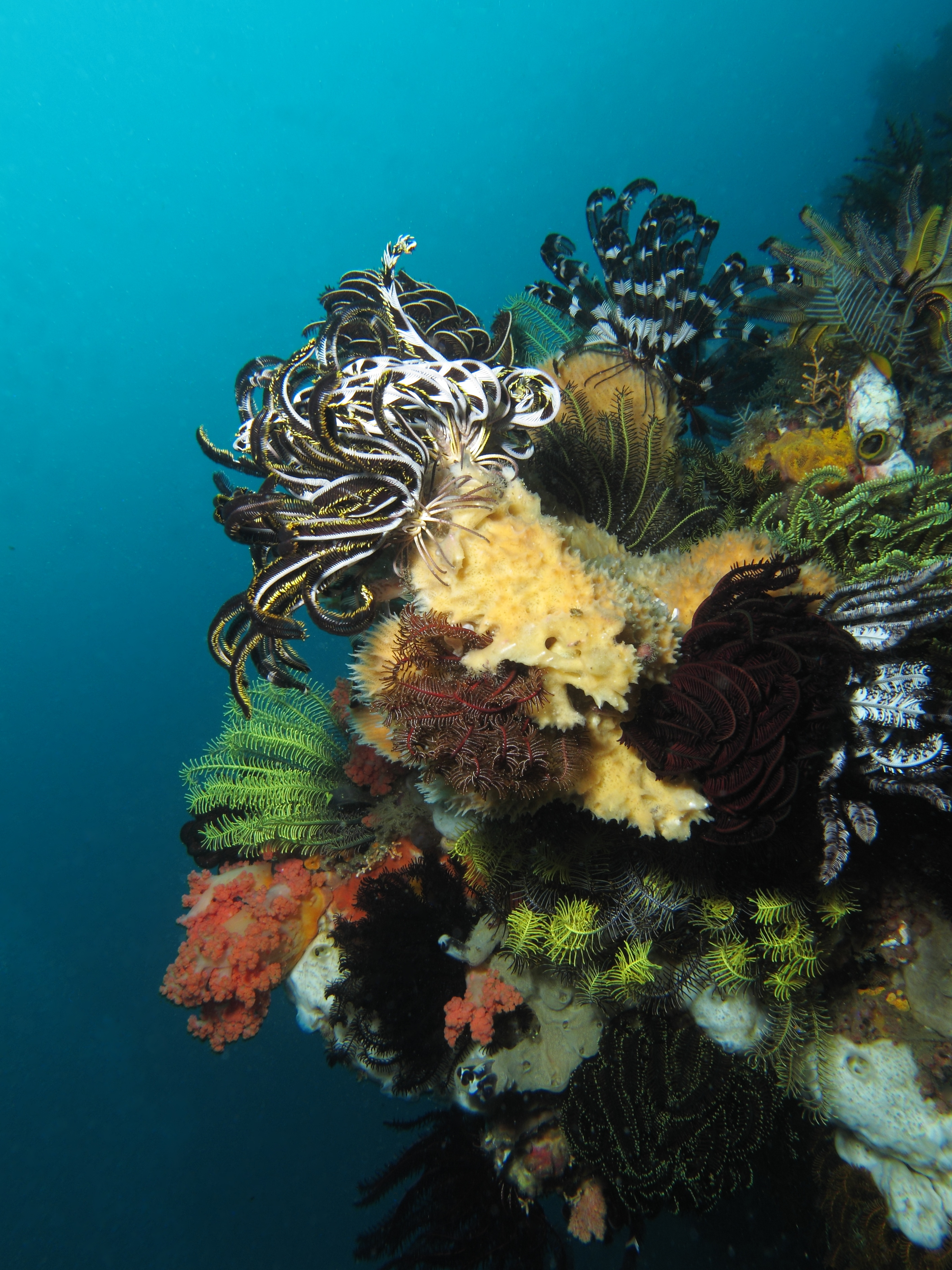
Multiple crinoids on a reef in Indonesia

Crinoidea has been accepted as a distinct clade of echinoderms since the definition of the group by Miller in 1821. It includes many extinct orders as well as four closely related living orders (Comatulida, Cyrtocrinida, Hyocrinida, and Isocrinida), which are part of the subgroup Articulata. Living articulates comprise around 540 species. Below is a revised rank-based classification of the Crinoidea according to Wright et al. (2017).

Class Crinoidea Miller, 1821

- Crinoidea incertae sedis
  - †Protocrinoidea Guensburg and Sprinkle, 2003
- Subclass †Camerata Wachsmuth and Springer, 1885
  - 'Stem eucamerates' (e.g., †Eknomocrinus)
  - Infraclass †Eucamerata Cole, 2017
    - Order †Diplobathrida Moore and Laudon, 1943
    - Order †Monobathrida Moore and Laudon, 1943
- Subclass Pentacrinoidea Jackel, 1894
  - 'Stem inadunates' (e.g., †Apektocrinus)
  - Infraclass Inadunata Wachsmuth and Springer, 1885
    - Parvclass †Disparida Moore and Laudon, 1943
      - Order †Calceocrinida Meek and Worthen, 1869
      - Order †Eustenocrinida Ulrich, 1925
      - Order †Maennilicrinida Ausich, 1998b
      - Order †Tetragonocrinida Stukalina, 1980
      - Disparida incertae sedis
        - †'Homocrinida' Kirk, 1914
        - †'Myelodactyla' Miller, 1883
        - †'Pisocrinoidea' Ausich and Copper, 2010
    - Parvclass Cladida Moore and Laudon, 1943
      - Superorder †Porocrinoidea Wright, 2017
        - Order †Hybocrinida Jackel, 1918
        - Order †Porocrinida Miller and Gurley, 1894
      - Superorder †Flexibilia Zittel, 1895
        - Genus †Cupulocrinus d'Orbigny, 1849
        - Order †Sagenocrinida Springer, 1913
        - Order †Taxocrinida Springer, 1913
      - Magnorder Eucladida Wright, 2017
        - Eucladida incertae sedis
          - †'Ampelocrinida' Webster and Jell, 1999
        - Superorder †Cyathoformes Wright, Ausich, Cole, Peter, and Rhenberg, 2017
          - Cyathoformes incertae sedis
            - †'Cyathocrinida' Bather, 1899
            - †'Dendrocrinida' Bather, 1899
            - †'Poteriocrinida' Jackel, 1918
        - Superorder Articulata Miller, 1821
          - Order †Encrinida Matsumoto, 1929
          - Order †Holocrinida Jaekel, 1918
          - Order †Millericrinida Sieverts-Doreck, 1953
          - Order †Roveacrinida Sieverts-Doreck, 1953
          - Order †Uintacrinida Zittel, 1879
          - Order Comatulida Clark, 1908
          - Order Cyrtocrinida Sieverts-Doreck, 1953
          - Order Hyocrinida Rasmussen, 1978
          - Order Isocrinida Sieverts-Doreck, 1953

=== Phylogeny ===
The phylogeny, geologic history, and classification of the Crinoidea was discussed by Wright et al. (2017), where the authors present a summary tree of results of recent phylogenetic analyses, shown below.

- Crinoidea
  - †Camerata
    - †Eknomocrinus
    - †Adelphicrinus
    - †Eucamerata
      - †Rosfacrinus
      - †Diplobathrida
      - †Monobathrida
  - Pentacrinoidea
    - †Apektocrinus
    - Inadunata
      - †Disparida
      - Cladida
        - †Porocrinoidea
          - †Hybocrinida
          - †Porocrinida
        - - †Flexibilia
          - Eucladida
            - †Dendrocrinus
            - Articulata

== In culture ==
Fossilised crinoid columnal segments extracted from limestone quarried on Lindisfarne, or found washed up along the foreshore, were threaded into necklaces or rosaries, and became known as St. Cuthbert's beads in the Middle Ages. Similarly, in the Midwestern United States, fossilized segments of the columns of crinoids are sometimes known as Indian beads. A species of crinoid, Eperisocrinus missouriensis, is the state fossil of Missouri. The aliens in the movie franchise Alien were inspired by crinoids.

== Fossil crinoid gallery ==
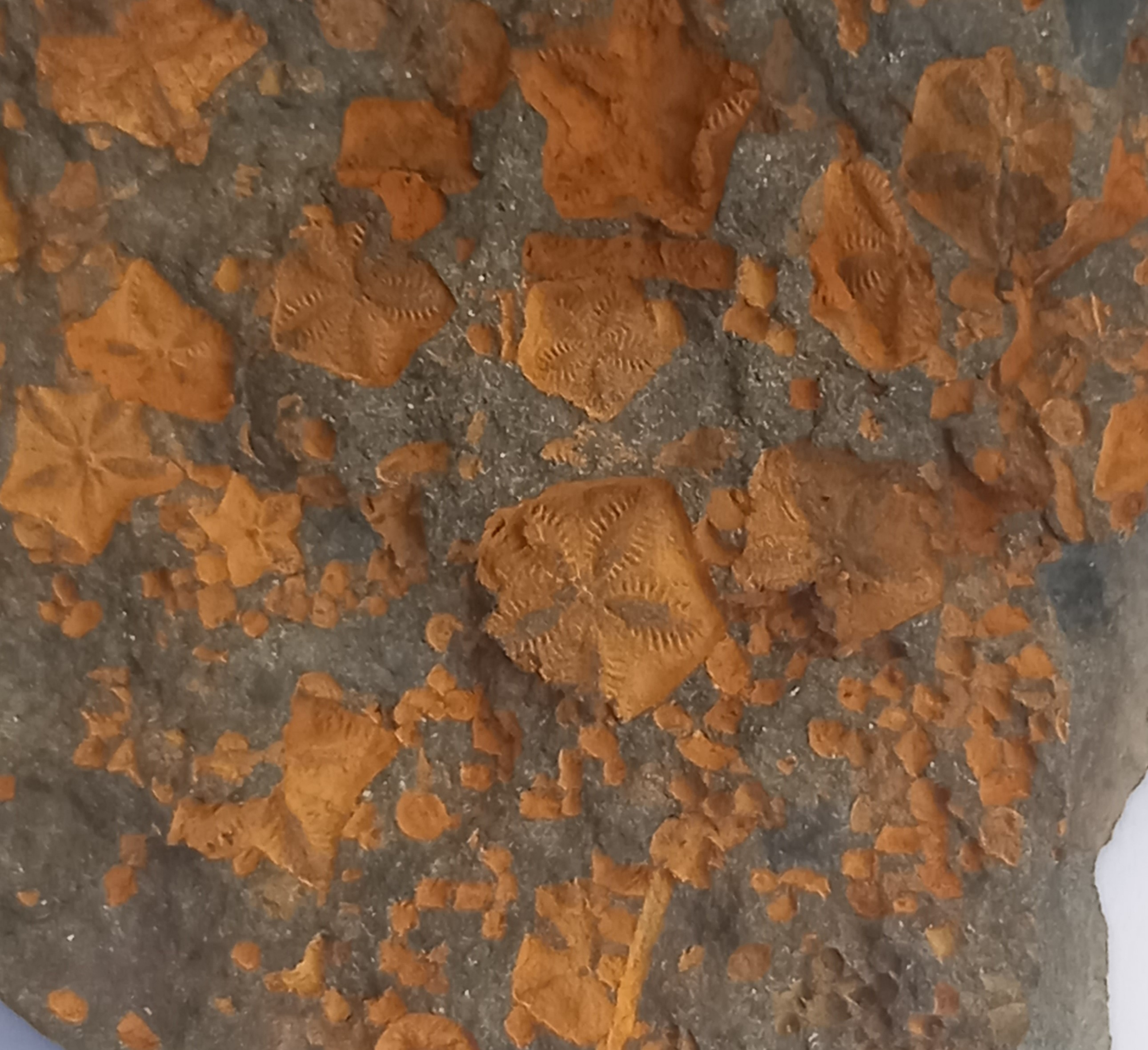
Crushed crinoid stems from Shamshak Formation, Jurassic, Iran

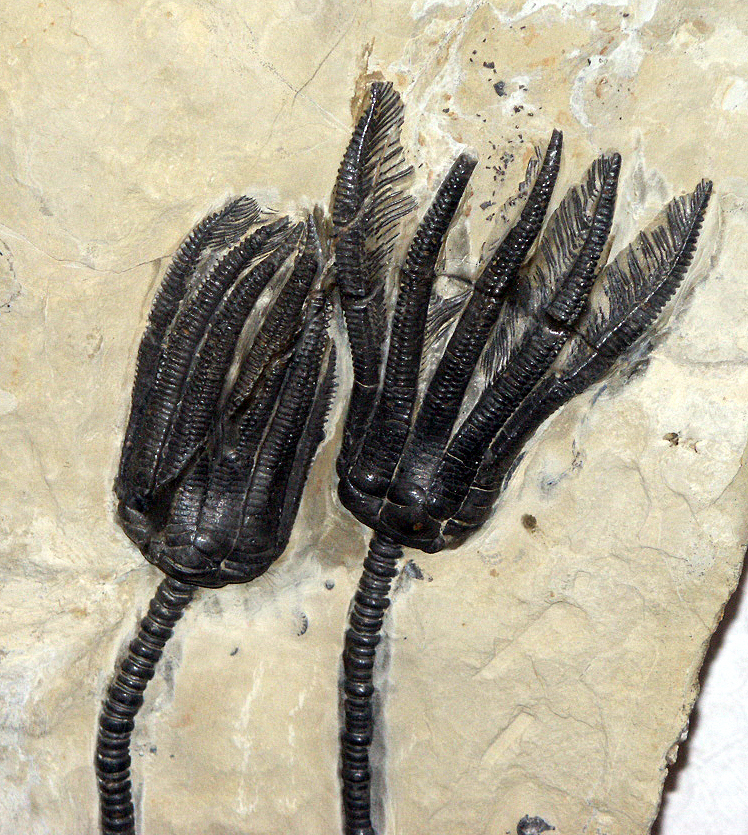
Fossil from Germany showing the stem, calyx, and arms with pinnules

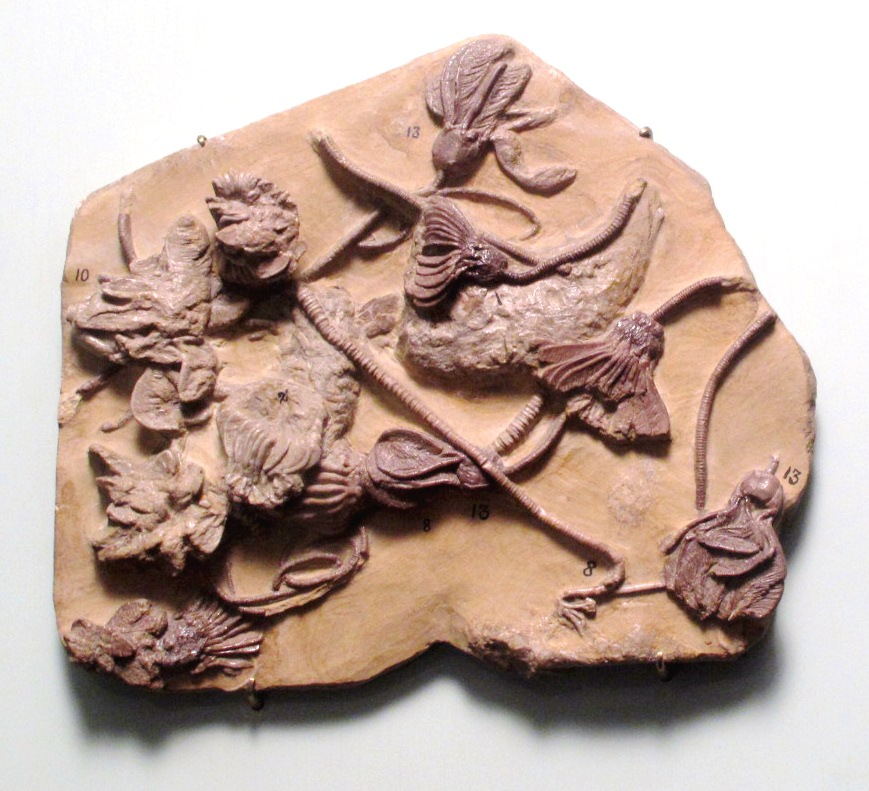
330 million year old crinoid fossils from Iowa

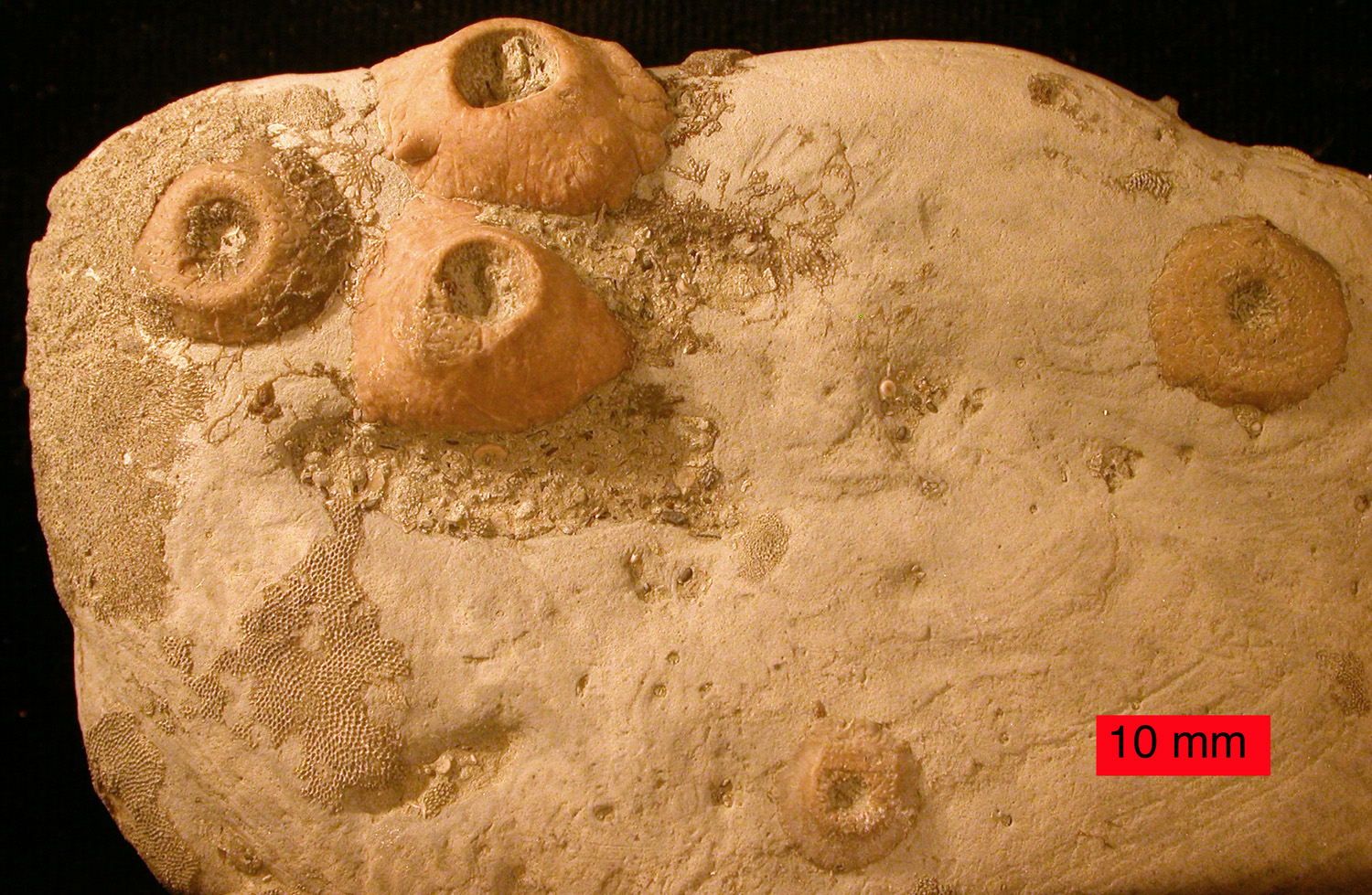
Crinoid holdfasts and bryozoans on an Upper Ordovician cobble from northern Kentucky

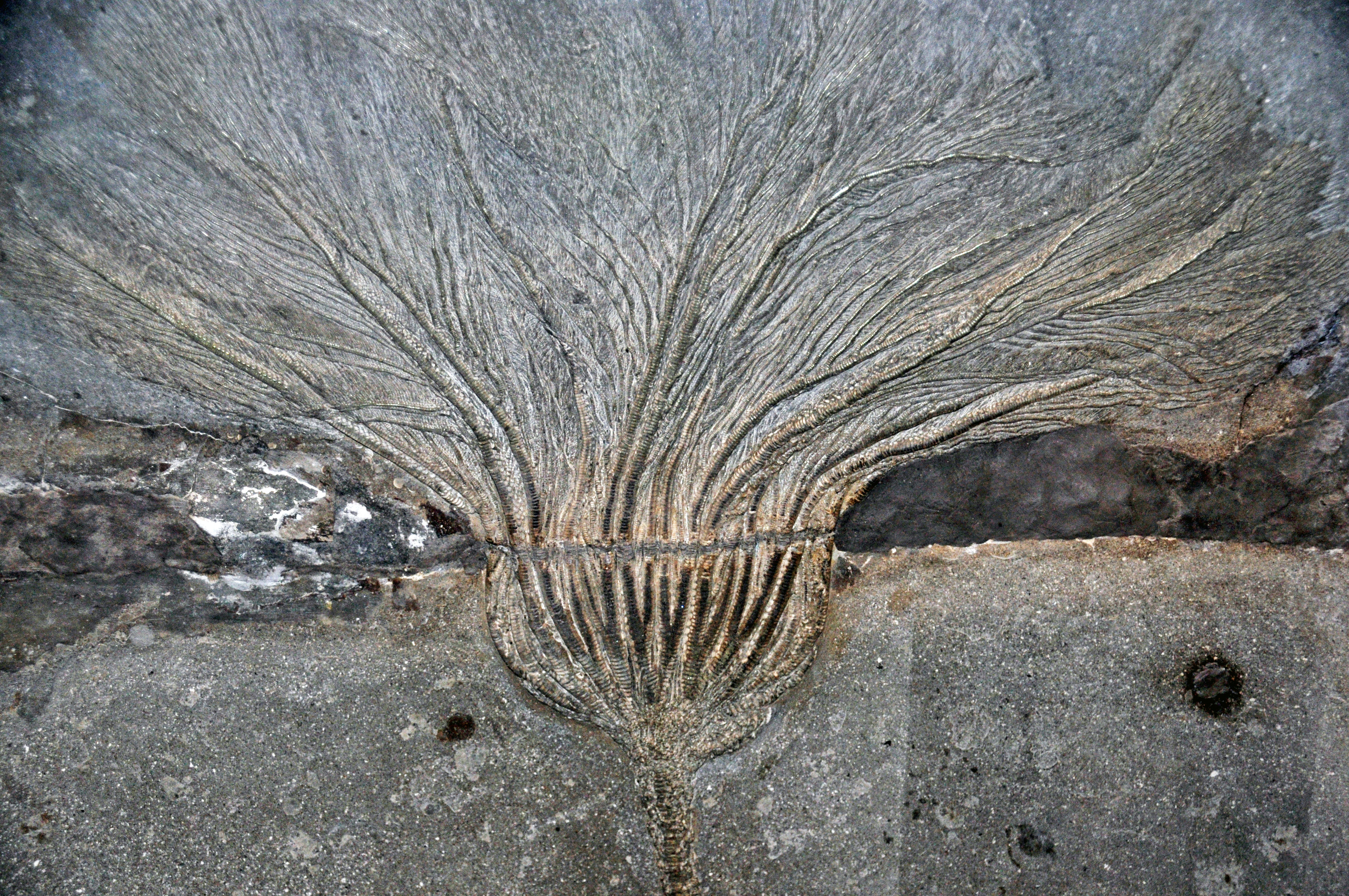
Seirocrinus subangularis from the Early Jurassic Posidonia Shale at Holzmaden, Germany

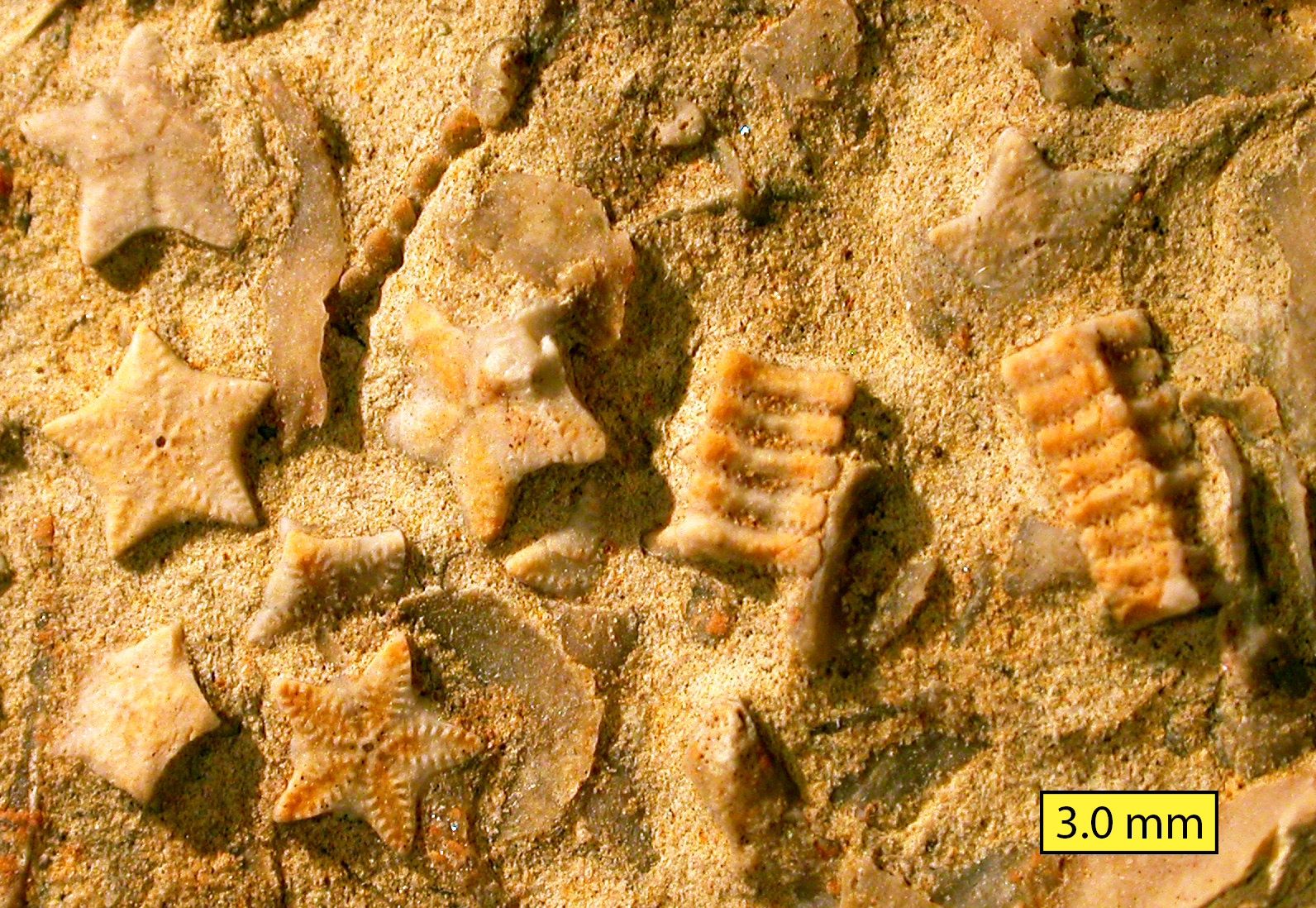
Crinoid columnals (Isocrinus nicoleti) from the Middle Jurassic Carmel Formation at Mount Carmel Junction, Utah

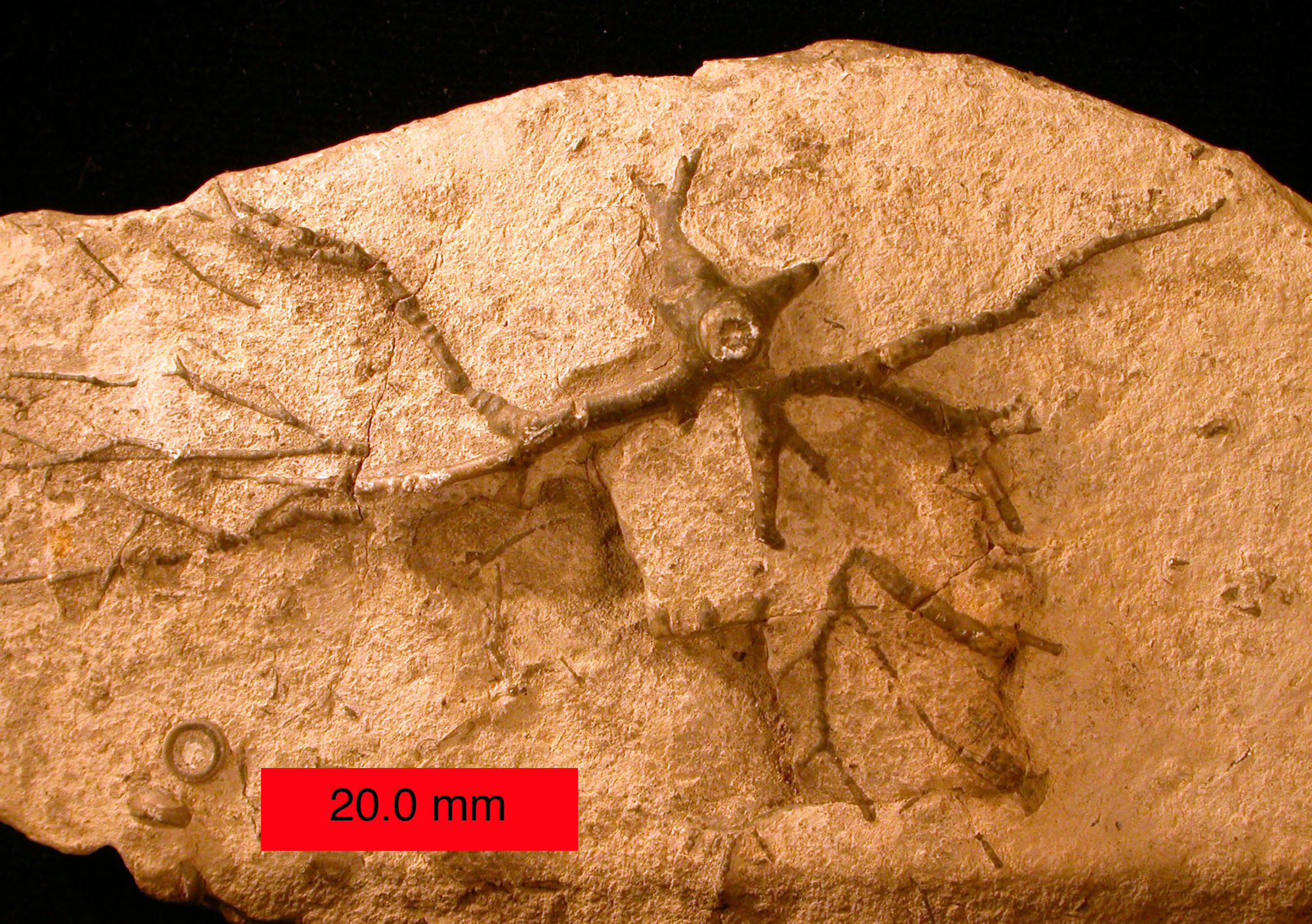
Root-like crinoid holdfast from the Upper Ordovician, southern Ohio

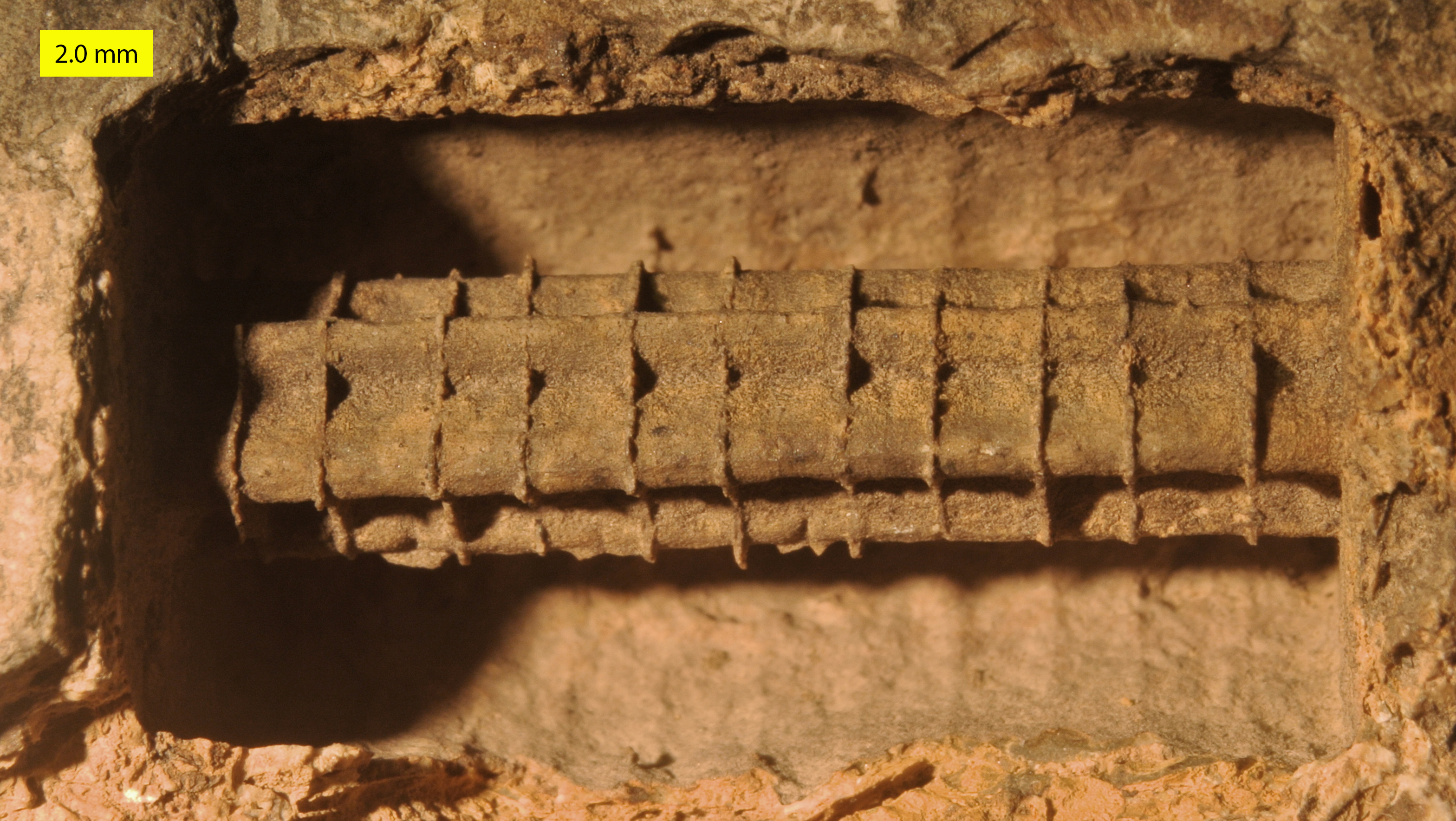
Internal mold of crinoid stem lumen (and external mold of stem) from Lower Carboniferous, Ohio

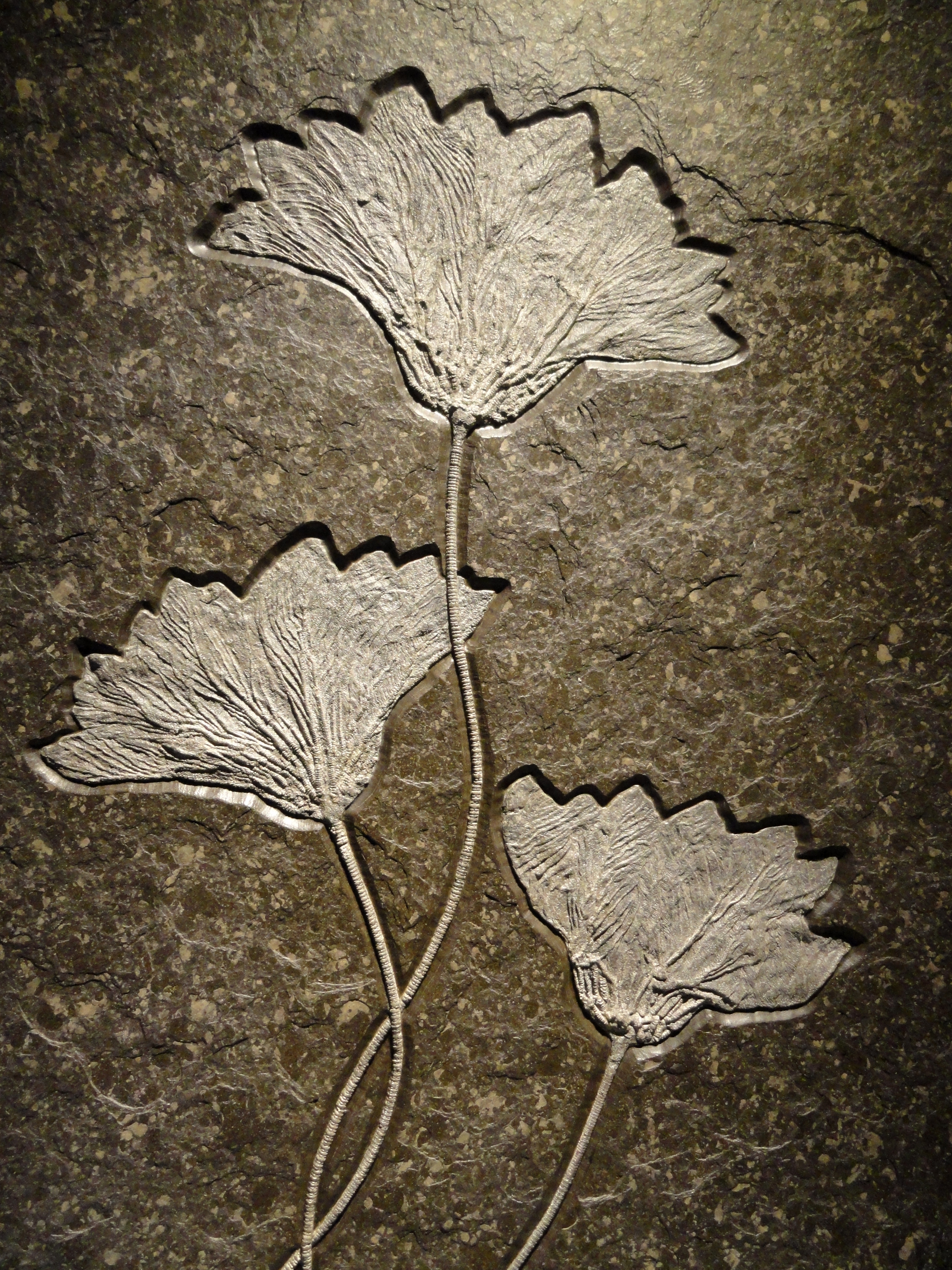
Fossils of Seirocrinus subsingularis from the Jurassic Holzmaden Black Shale Formation, Germany

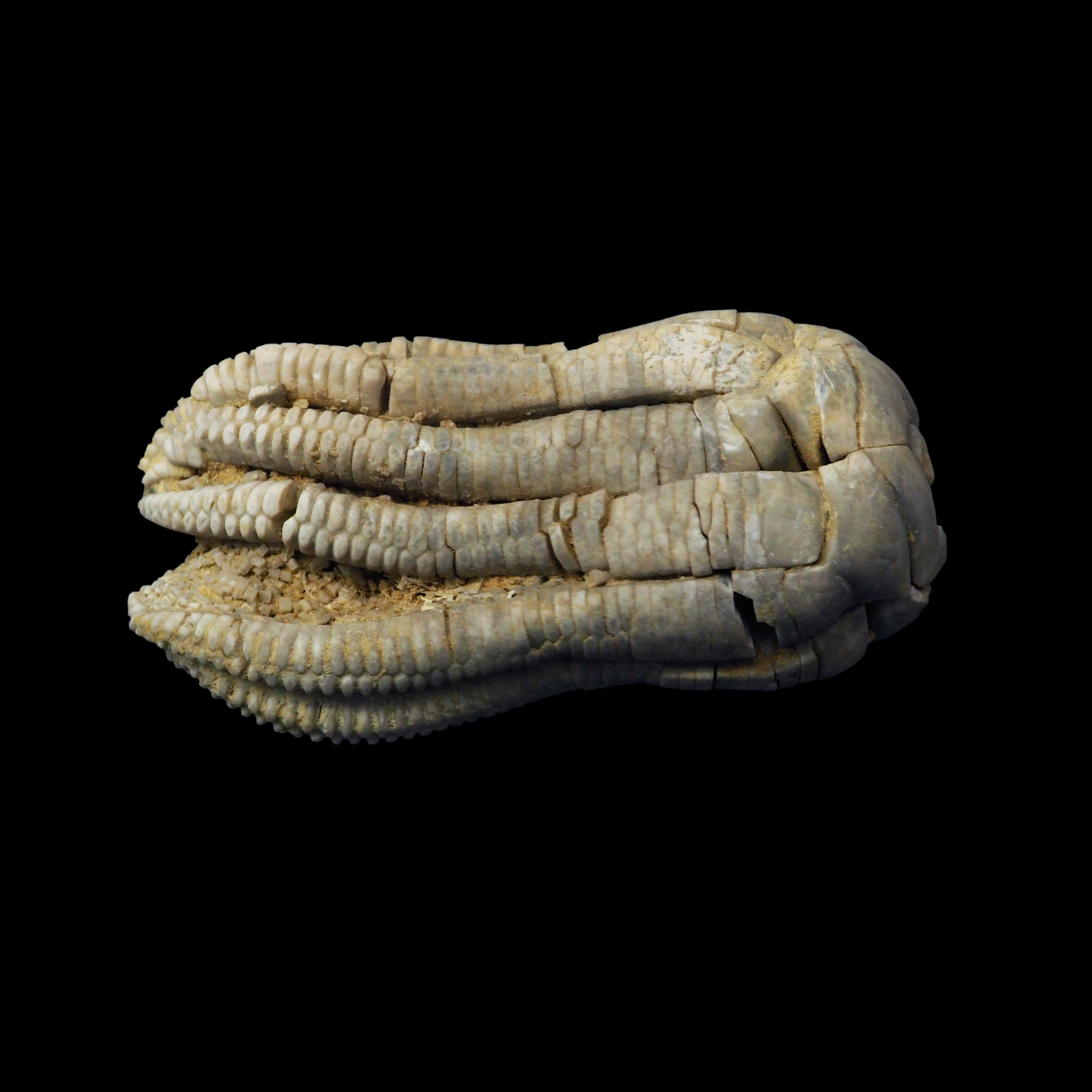
240 million year old crinoid fossil

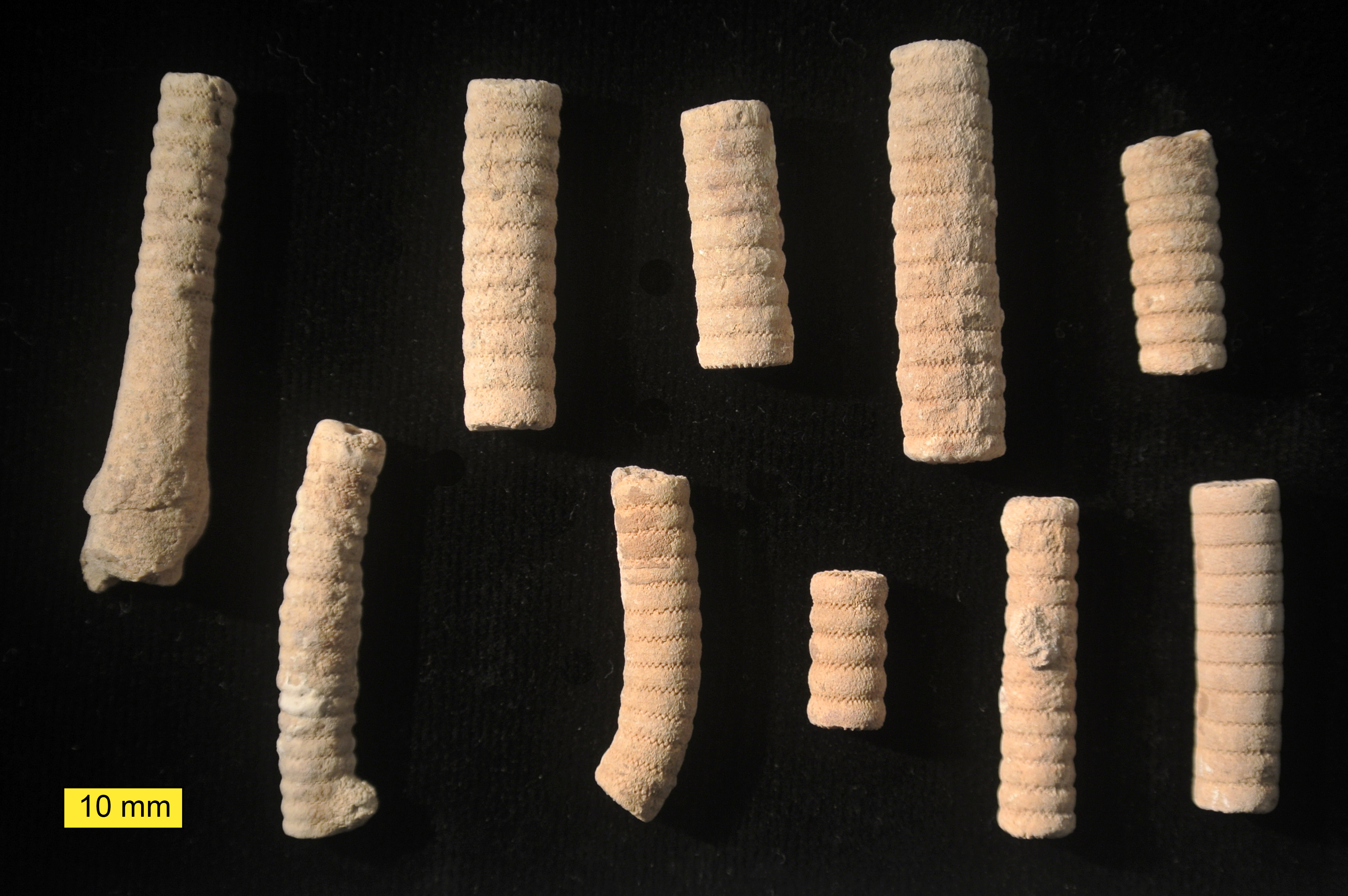
Middle Jurassic (Callovian) Apiocrinites crinoid pluricolumnals from the Matmor Formation in southern Israel

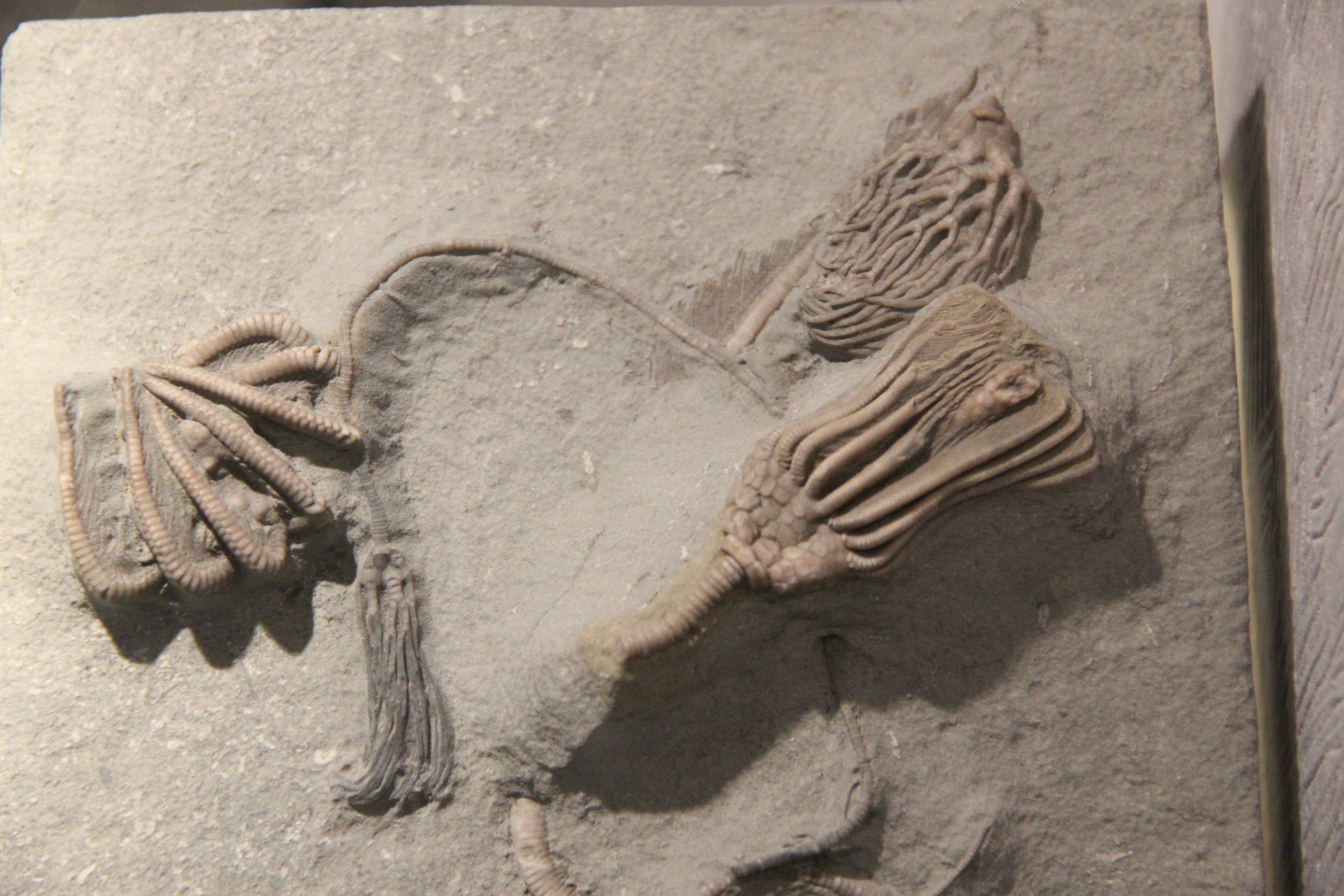
Fossil crinoids, Henan Geological Museum, Zhengzhou, China

== See also ==
- Echinobase, a database that contains information about various echinoderms, including a crinoid species.
