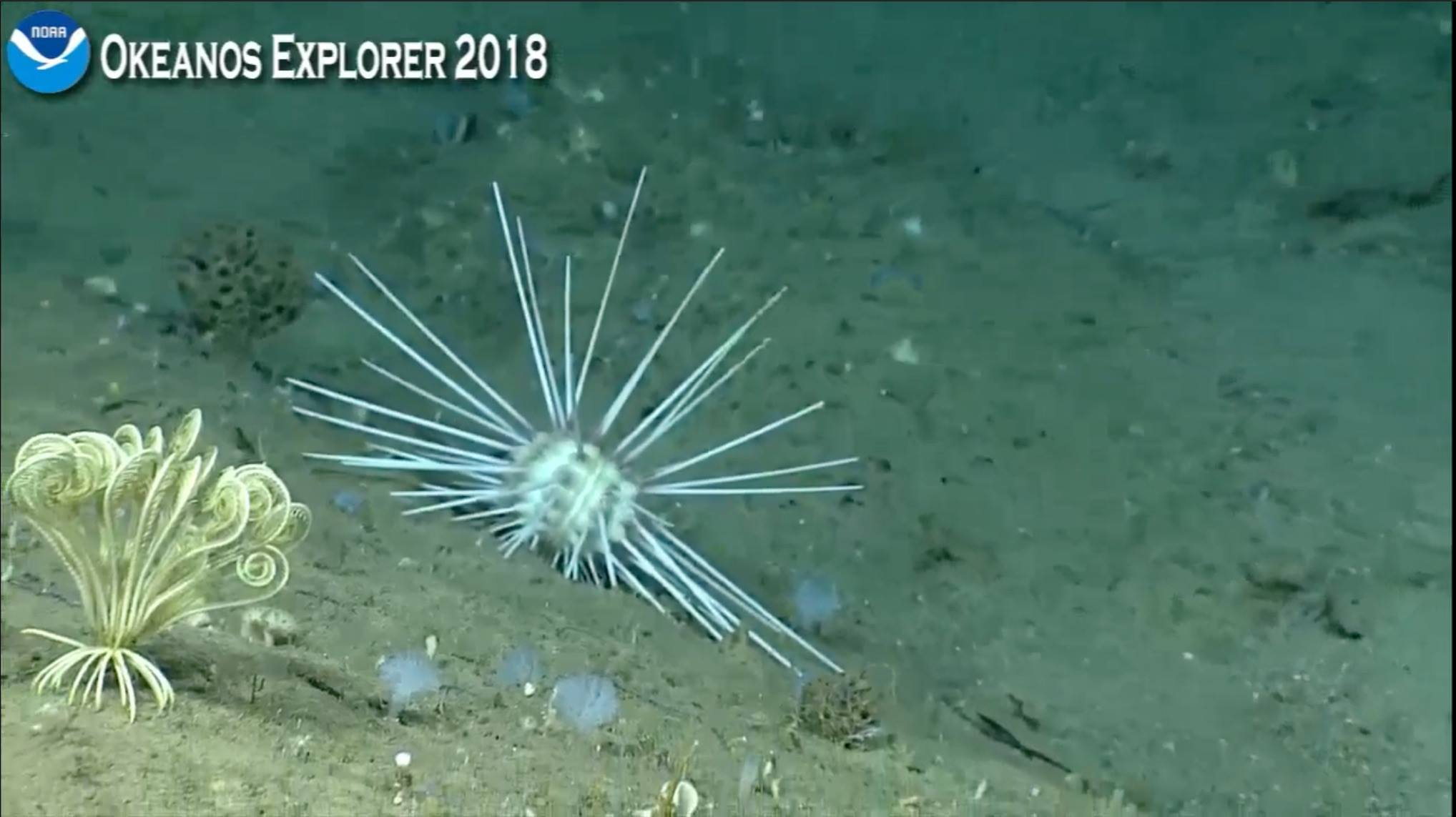
- Calocidaris micans

Scientific classification
- Kingdom: Animalia
- Phylum: Echinodermata
- Class: Echinoidea
- Order: Cidaroida
- Family: Cidaridae
- Subfamily: Cidarinae
- Genus: Calocidaris; Clark, 1907

= Calocidaris =

Genus of sea urchins

Calocidaris is a genus of echinoderms belonging to the family Cidaridae.

The species of this genus are found in Central America.

Species:

- Calocidaris micans (Mortensen, 1903)
- Calocidaris palmeri Cutress, 1980
