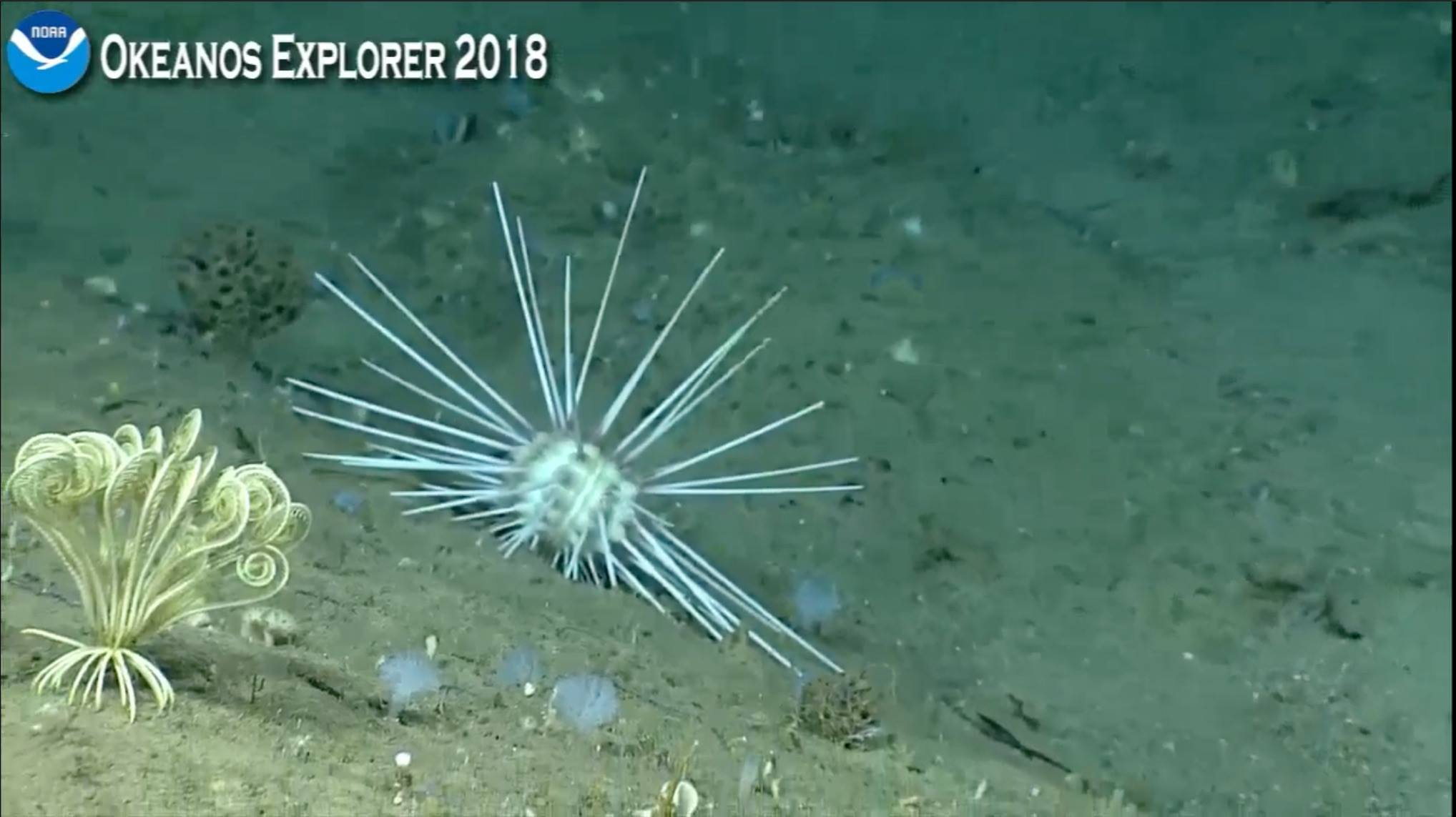

Scientific classification
- Kingdom: Animalia
- Phylum: Echinodermata
- Class: Echinoidea
- Order: Cidaroida
- Family: Cidaridae
- Genus: Calocidaris
- Species: C. micans

Binomial name
- Calocidaris micans (Mortensen, 1903)

= Calocidaris micans =

Species of sea urchin

Calocidaris micans is a species of sea urchins of the family Cidaridae. Their armour is covered with spines. Calocidaris micans was first scientifically described in 1903 by Ole Mortensen.
