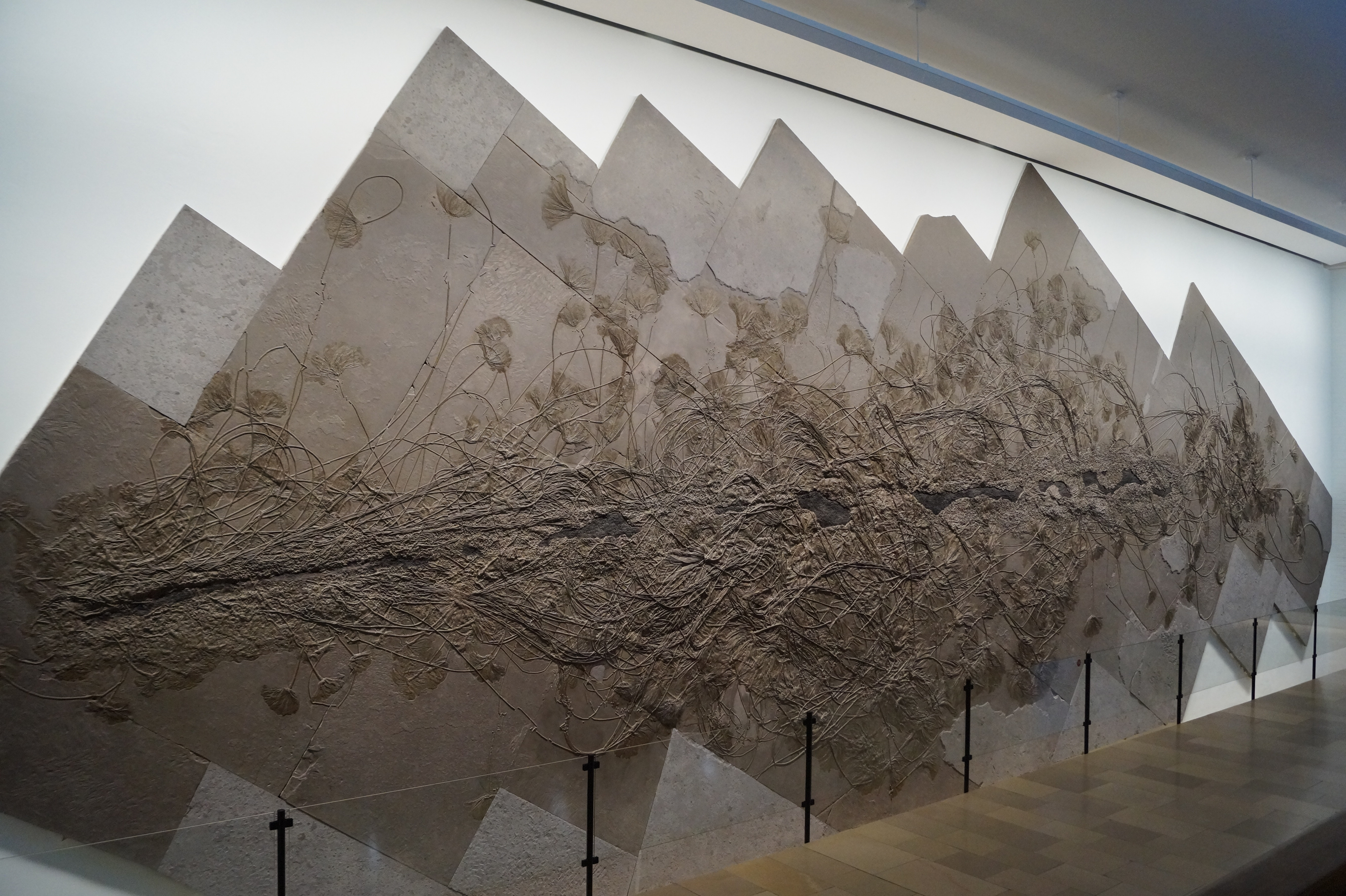
- Giant (18 x 6 m) colony over an Agathoxylon log

Scientific classification
- Kingdom: Animalia
- Phylum: Echinodermata
- Class: Crinoidea
- Superorder: Articulata
- Order: Isocrinida
- Family: †Pentacrinitidae
- Genus: †Seirocrinus; Gislén, 1924

Type species
- Pentacrinites subangularis Miller, 1821

Species
- S. subangularis (Miller, 1821) (type); S. acutipelvis (Quenstedt, 1876); S. alaskae (Springer, 1925); S. klikushini (Simms, 1989); S. laevisutus (Pompeckj, 1897)

= Seirocrinus =

Seirocrinus Temporal range: Late Triassic (Norian)– Middle Jurassic (Bathonian)

Extinct genus of pseudoplanktonic crinoids

Seirocrinus is an extinct genus of stalked crinoids (sea lilies) belonging to the family Pentacrinitidae. It lived from the Late Triassic (Norian) to the Middle Jurassic (Bathonian) and is best known as a pseudo-planktonic form that attached to floating driftwood. It represents the largest known crinoid and echinoderm overall, with specimens close to 30 m (98 ft).

== Description ==
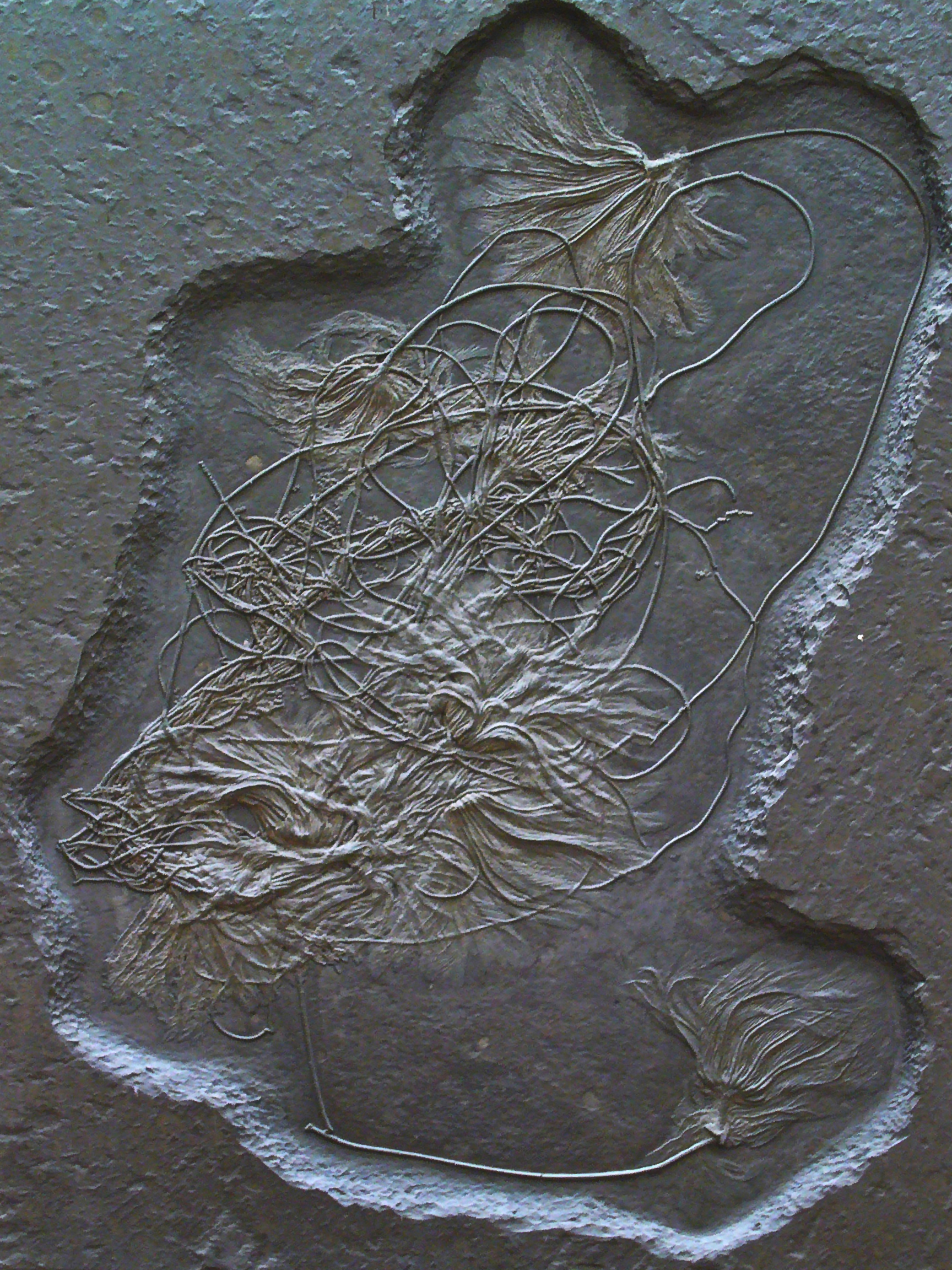
Seirocrinus subangularis from the Posidonia Shale

Members of the genus possessed long, flexible stems that could reach lengths of 20 to 26 m (66 to 85 ft) in exceptional specimens. Columnal segments range from pentagonal or subpentagonal in proximal regions to rounded or nearly circular distally. Articular facets display characteristic narrow, pyriform petal floors bordered by numerous fine crenulae, with triangular rugose areas separating the petals. The cirri are short, slender and compressed; they arise from small sockets on the nodals and served as the attachment structures to the substrate, such as wood. The arms branch endotomously, producing a dense filtration fan to capture food particles.

== Taxonomy ==
The genus was established by Gislén in 1924, with Pentacrinites subangularis Miller, 1821 as the type species. It is placed in the suborder Pentacrinitina within the order Isocrinida. Several species have been recognised, although some authors have synonymised certain forms with the widespread type species S. subangularis.

== Ecology ==
Fossils have previously been recorded from Asia, Europe, and North America. North African specimens from Morocco and Algeria were described in 2024; this locale conforms to the southern margin of the Tethys Ocean.

Seirocrinus is thought to have lived as a pseudoplankton, with massive colonies attaching to the undersides of drifting logs by means of dense clusters of cirri. It was an open ocean organism that lived on rafting wood, probably filtering food and serving as a refuge for other animals, such as various ammonite species, as well early pelagic cirripeds. This lifestyle allowed them to inhabit surface waters far from the seafloor. Individuals grew rapidly and colonies could persist for 15–20 years on a single piece of wood before the increasing weight caused the log to sink, which eventually kills the crinoid. The crinoids had a large colonization process, based on their fossils in the wood. It has been estimated that without the presence of modern raft wood predators (that appeared in the Bathonian) these rafts could have lasted floating +5 years, allowing the crinoids to reach such huge sizes. In the same way they supported this crinoids, other animals may have traveled in the large rafts along the Early Jurassic seas.
