= Metacrinus zonatus =

Scientific classification
- Domain: Eukaryota
- Kingdom: Animalia
- Phylum: Echinodermata
- Class: Crinoidea
- Order: Isocrinida
- Family: Isocrinidae
- Genus: Metacrinus
- Species: M. zonatus

Binomial name
- Metacrinus zonatus Clark, 1908

Species of echinoderm

Metacrinus zonatus is a sea lily from the Isocrinidae family.

The scientific name of the species was published in 1908 by Austin Hobart Clark.
