= Neocrinus naresianus =

Scientific classification
- Kingdom: Animalia
- Phylum: Echinodermata
- Class: Crinoidea
- Superorder: Articulata
- Order: Isocrinida
- Family: Balanocrinidae
- Subfamily: Balanocrininae
- Genus: Neocrinus
- Species: N. naresianus

Binomial name
- Neocrinus naresianus (Carpenter, 1884)

Synonyms
- Pentacrinus naresianus Carpenter, 1884; Hypalocrinus naresianus (Carpenter, 1884)

Species of echinoderm

Neocrinus naresianus is a species of sea lily, echinoderms belonging to the family Balanocrinidae. It was previously part of the monotypic genus Hypalocrinus; a study comparing ontogenetic development of brachial articulations suggested that the genus Hypalocrinus is in fact be a synonym of Neocrinus, and the only species should be part of that genus.

The species is found in Malesia.
