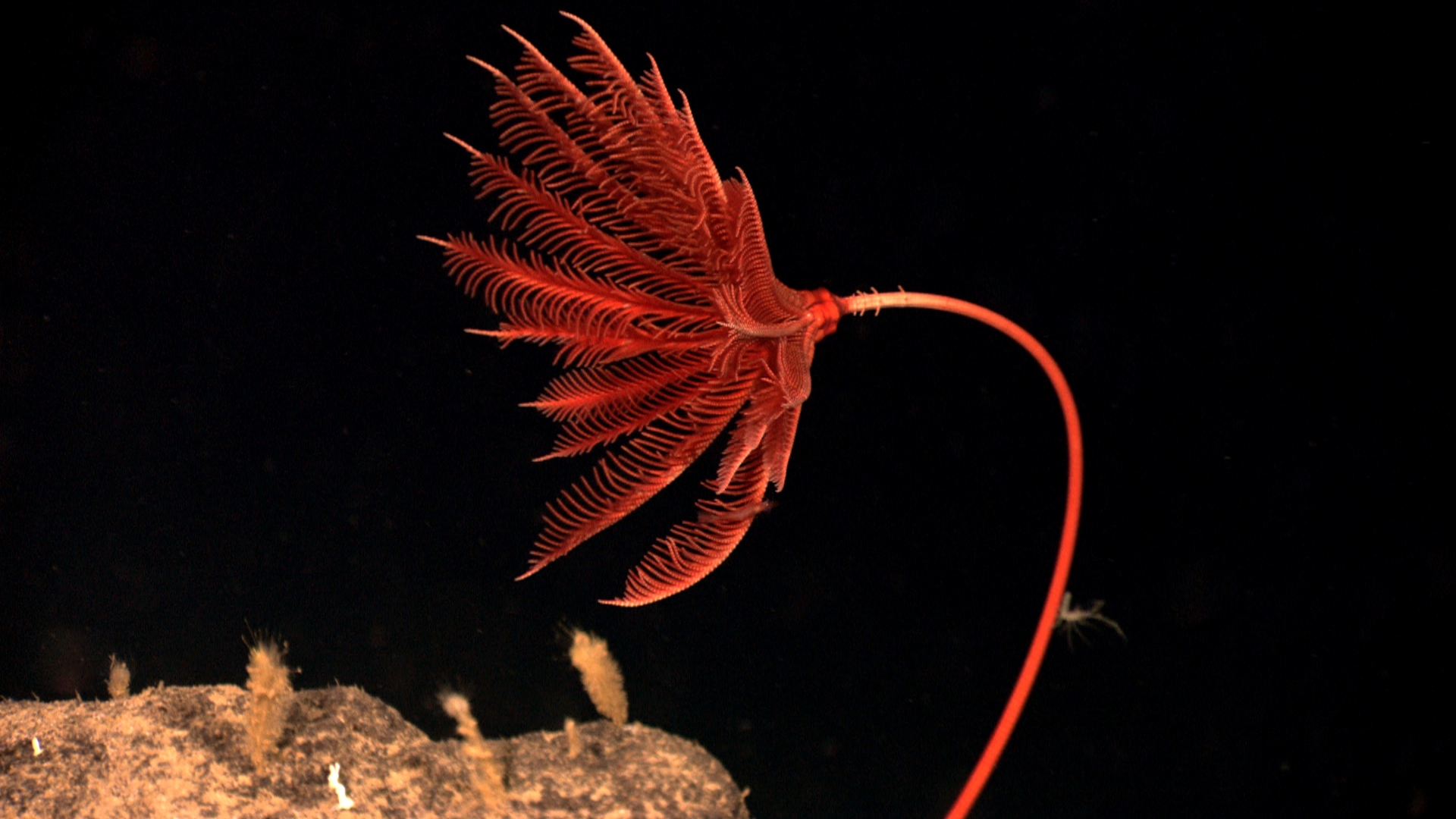
- Proisocrinus ruberrimus

Scientific classification
- Kingdom: Animalia
- Phylum: Echinodermata
- Class: Crinoidea
- Order: Isocrinida
- Family: Balanocrinidae
- Subfamily: Proisocrininae; Rasmussen, 1978

Genera
- †Austinocrinus De Loriol, 1889; Proisocrinus AH Clark, 1910

Synonyms
- Proisocrinidae Rasmussen, 1978

= Proisocrininae =

Genus of crinoids

Proisocrininae is a subfamily of crinoids. It is defined by few and/or rudimentary cirri restricted close to the arms, a well-individualized aboral cup, short brachitaxes, a homeomorphic stalk, and an attachment disk that "incrusts" the substrate.

Genera:

- †Austinocrinus De Loriol, 1889
- Proisocrinus AH Clark, 1910
