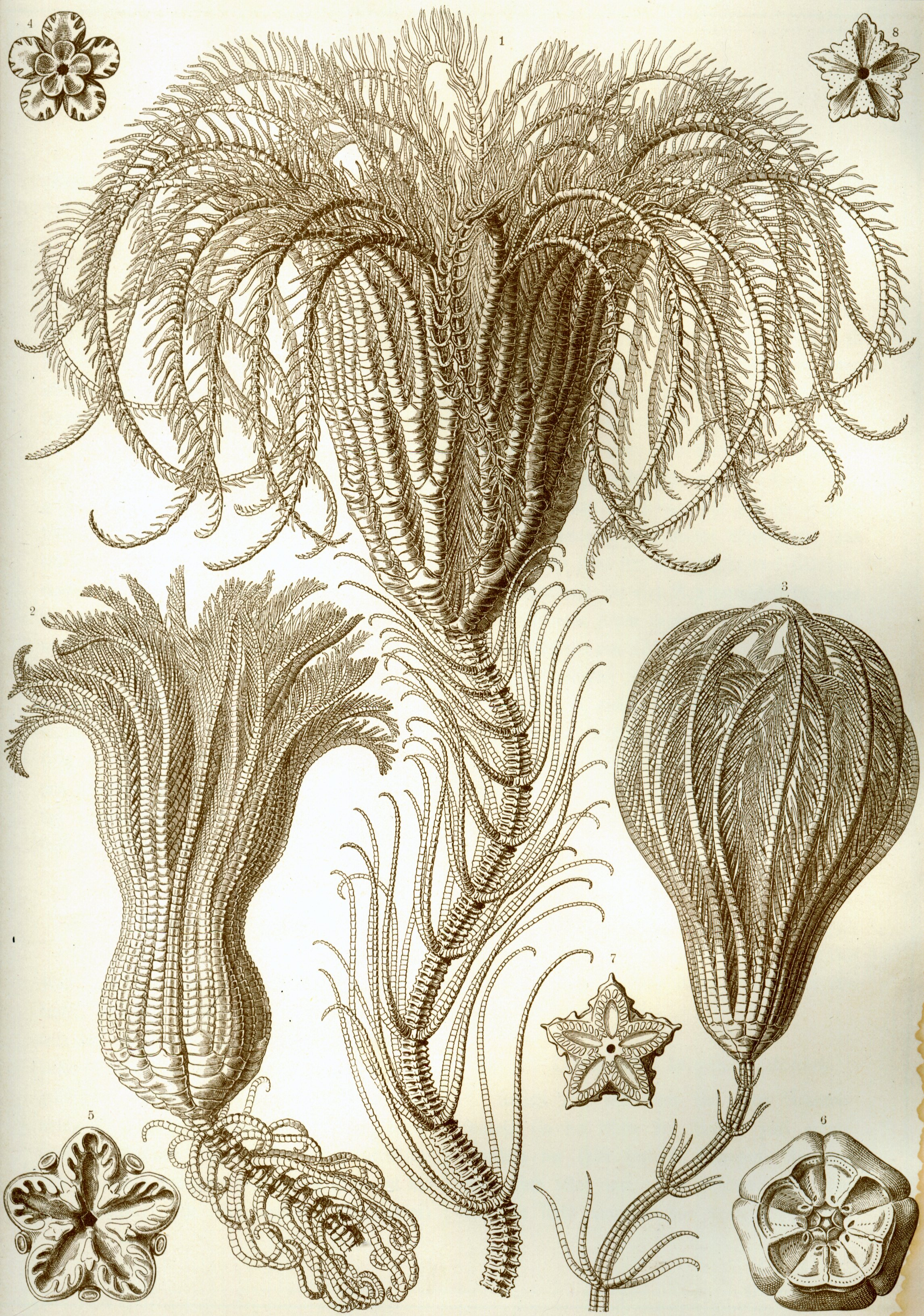
- Plate from Ernst Haeckel's Kunstformen der Natur (1904)

Scientific classification
- Kingdom: Animalia
- Phylum: Echinodermata
- Class: Crinoidea
- Superorder: Articulata
- Order: Isocrinida
- Family: Isocrinidae
- Genus: Metacrinus; Carpenter, 1882

Species
- See text

= Metacrinus =

Genus of crinoids

Metacrinus is a genus of stalked crinoids in the family Isocrinidae. Members of this genus live on hard surfaces in deeper parts of the ocean. The genus has extant species and is also represented in the fossil record. Members of the genus grow to a maximum height of 60 centimetres (24 in) and are found in the eastern Pacific Ocean from Japan to Australia.

== Species ==
The World Register of Marine Species lists the following species in the genus:

- Metacrinus costatus Carpenter, 1884
- Metacrinus interruptus Carpenter, 1884
- Metacrinus levii Améziane-Cominardi, 1990
- Metacrinus musorstomae Roux, 1981
- Metacrinus nodosus Carpenter, 1884
- Metacrinus rotundus Carpenter, 1885
- Metacrinus serratus Döderlein, 1907
- Metacrinus wyvillii Carpenter, 1884
- Metacrinus zonatus AH Clark, 1908
