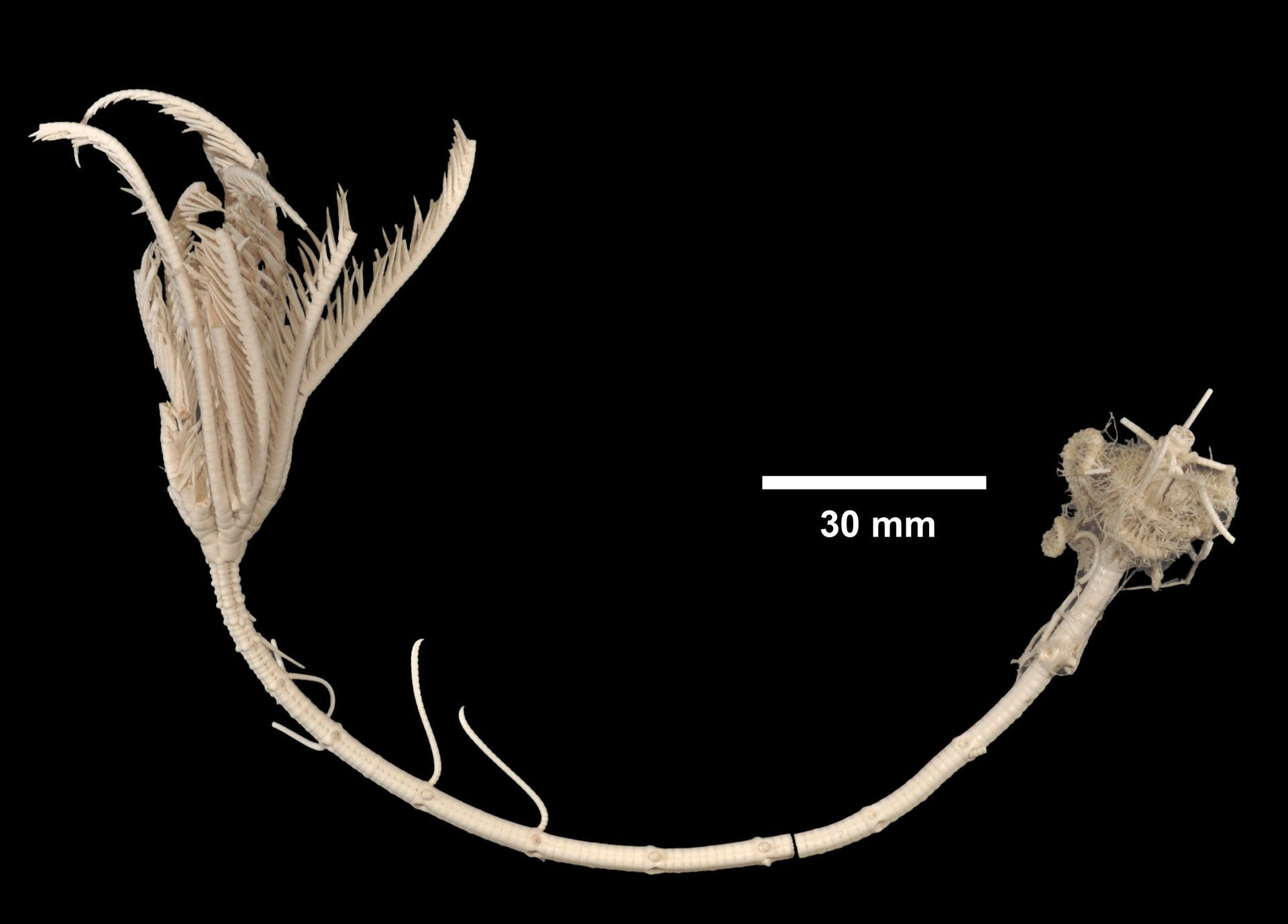
- Neocrinus decorus

Scientific classification
- Kingdom: Animalia
- Phylum: Echinodermata
- Class: Crinoidea
- Superorder: Articulata
- Order: Isocrinida
- Family: Balanocrinidae
- Subfamily: Balanocrininae
- Genus: Neocrinus; Thomson, 1864

Synonyms
- Hypalocrinus Clark, 1908

= Neocrinus =

Neocrinus Temporal range: 23.03–Recent Ma

Genus of crinoids

Neocrinus is a genus of crinoids in the family Balanocrinidae, which is otherwise extinct (this genus being a relict). Members of this genus appeared in the fossil record 23.03 million years ago in the Miocene Epoch, and currently contains three known extant species.

== Species ==
- Neocrinus blakei (Carpenter, 1884)
- Neocrinus decorus (Thomson, 1864)
- Neocrinus naresianus (Carpenter, 1884)
