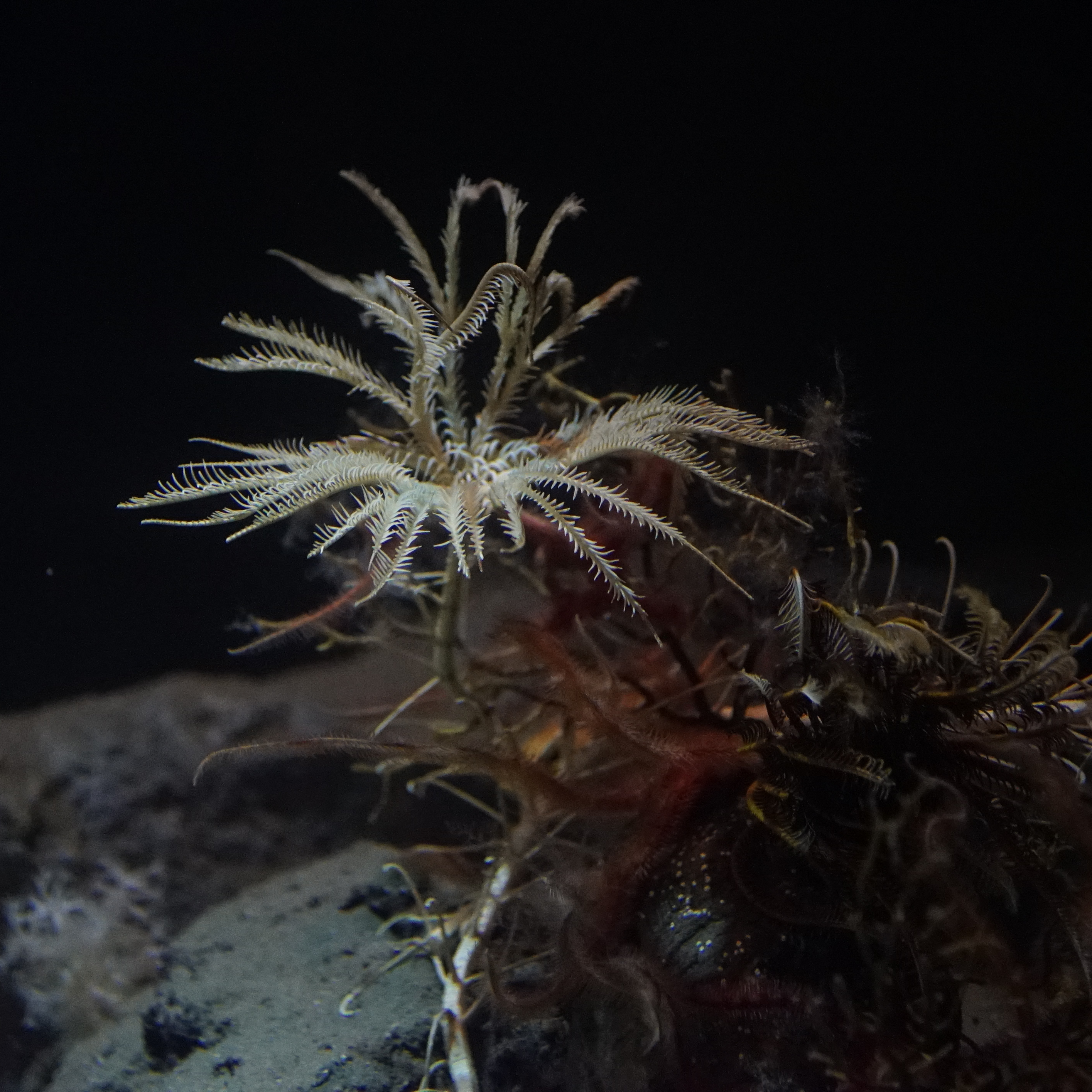
- Specimen in situ
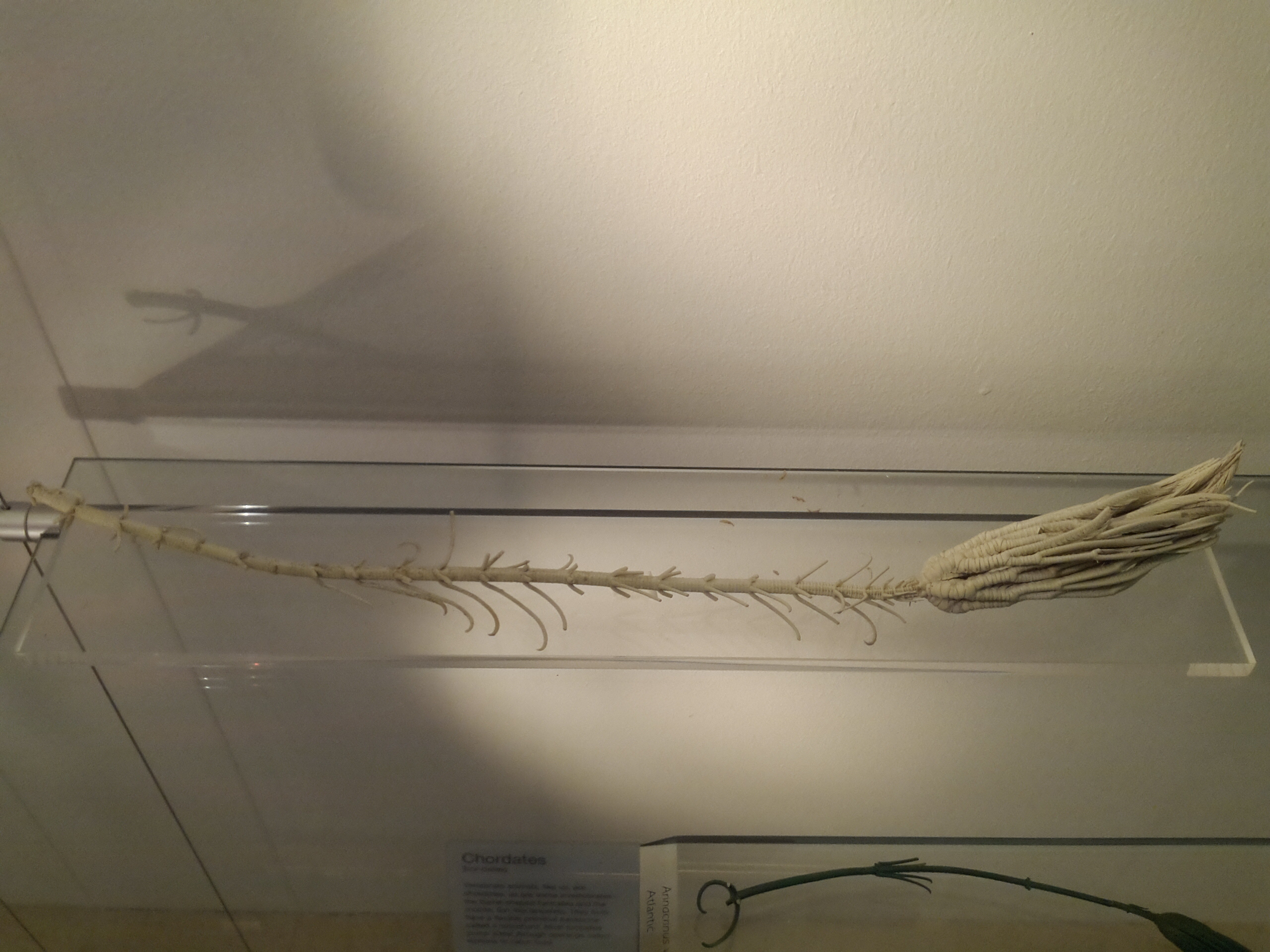
- Museum specimen

Scientific classification
- Kingdom: Animalia
- Phylum: Echinodermata
- Class: Crinoidea
- Superorder: Articulata
- Order: Isocrinida
- Family: Isocrinidae
- Genus: Metacrinus
- Species: M. rotundus

Binomial name
- Metacrinus rotundus Carpenter, 1885

= Metacrinus rotundus =

Species of crinoid

Metacrinus rotundus, the Japanese sea lily, is a species of stalked crinoid in the family Isselicrinidae. It is a species found off the west coast of Japan, near the edge of the continental shelf at a depth of around 100 to 150 metres (330 to 490 ft) deep. This is the shallowest-living species among the extant stalked crinoids.

== Description ==
In appearance, the Japanese sea lily resembles a feather duster. It has a central mouth surrounded by a crown of many-branched feeding arms. These are jointed and can coil up or unroll to expose the feathery pinnules on either side to the current. Each pinnule has several rows of tube feet and a central ambulacral groove that leads to a groove on the arm that continues down to the mouth. The crown is supported by a tough stalk composed of calcareous ossicles bound together by ligaments. At the base of the stalk is a disc-like sucker and the sides of the stalk bear five whorls of cirri (clawed appendages). The stalk continues lengthening during the animal's life and may reach 40 centimetres (16 in) and the arms can grow to half that length.

== Distribution and habitat ==
The Japanese sea lily occurs off the western coast of Japan. It is usually found within the depth range 100 to 150 metres (330 to 490 ft). Abundant collection records are available from Sagami Bay and Suruga Bay. It is found attached by its stem to rocks, shells and other hard surfaces, using its cirri to anchor itself into position. It can move across the seabed using its arms but seldom does so.

== Biology ==
The Japanese sea lily is a filter feeder. It extends its arms towards the current, spreads its pinnules and gathers plankton and other particles floating past. These are transferred into the groove by its tube feet, wrapped in mucus and moved along the groove by the cilia that line it.

If the Japanese sea lily is damaged, it can regenerate its arms and even the whole crown can be regenerated above the stalk. In favorable locations, there may be a dense bed of sea lilies and it may form part of a rich micro-habitat with bivalve mollusks and brittle stars.

Like other sea lilies, gametes are produced in specialized areas of the pinnules and liberated into the sea. After fertilization the eggs hatch into barrel-shaped larvae that are planktonic for a few days before settling on the seabed, cementing themselves to hard surfaces, undergoing metamorphosis and developing into juvenile sea lilies
