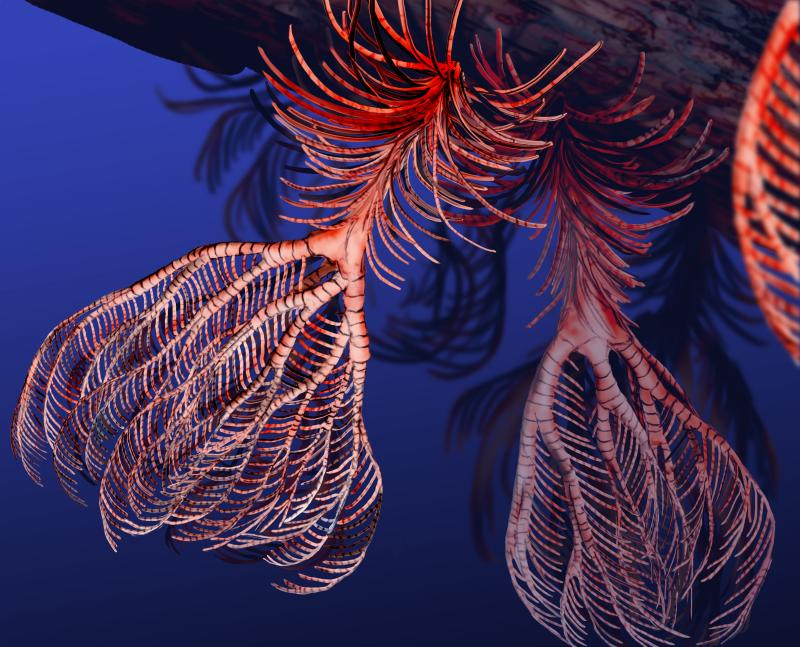
- A drawing of Pentacrinites

Scientific classification
- Kingdom: Animalia
- Phylum: Echinodermata
- Class: Crinoidea
- Order: Isocrinida
- Family: †Pentacrinitidae
- Genus: †Pentacrinites; Blumenbach, 1804

Species
- P. fossilis Blumenbach, 1804 (type) = P. britannicus; P. dargniesi (Hess, 1972) = Extracrinus dargniesi; P. dichotomus (McCoy, 1848); P. doreckae Simms, 1989; P. quenstedti Oppel, 1856 = Pentacrinus quenstedti

= Pentacrinites =

Pentacrinites Temporal range: Hettangian-Bathonian

Extinct genus of crinoids

Pentacrinites is an extinct genus of crinoids that lived from the Hettangian to the Bathonian of Asia, Europe, North America, and New Zealand. Their stems are pentagonal to star-shaped in cross-section and are the most commonly preserved parts. Pentacrinites are commonly found in the Pentacrinites Bed of the Early Jurassic (Lower Lias) of Lyme Regis, Dorset, England. Pentacrinites can be recognized by the extensions (or cirri) all around the stem, which are long, unbranching, and of increasing length further down, the very small cup and 5 long freely branching arms.

== Description ==
Like most echinoderms, Pentacrinites was composed of numerous calcite plates which were arranged into different body parts. Pentacrinites had 3 kinds of body parts: arms, cup (calyx or theca) and stem. The stem consisted of a stack of numerous 5-sided beads (or columnal plates) with a canal at their centre. The stem had flexible appendages (or cirri) that were used to attach an individual. These cirri themselves were connected to specialized columnals called nodals, leaving oval scars after breaking off. The cirri consisted of diamond-shaped plates with a central canal, less flatted further from the stem. The cup-shaped calyx was very small and consisted of two bands of five plates. These were the bases of the five arms. The top of the calyx was covered by numerous small polygonal plates and the mouth and anus were found on this surface.

The arms divide frequently, like tree branches, so that at the top end there could be over 50 branches in all. The arms were formed of piles of calcite plates. The arms carried many thin feeding branches (or pinnae, like a fern frond). These pinnae had tube feet, that were covered in mucus, reached into the water and caught plankton. These arms were not very mobile. The arms plates of the arms have an insertion, that formed a grove that ran along the length of the arm and onto the calyx. This served to transport the food particles to the mouth.

== Taxonomy ==
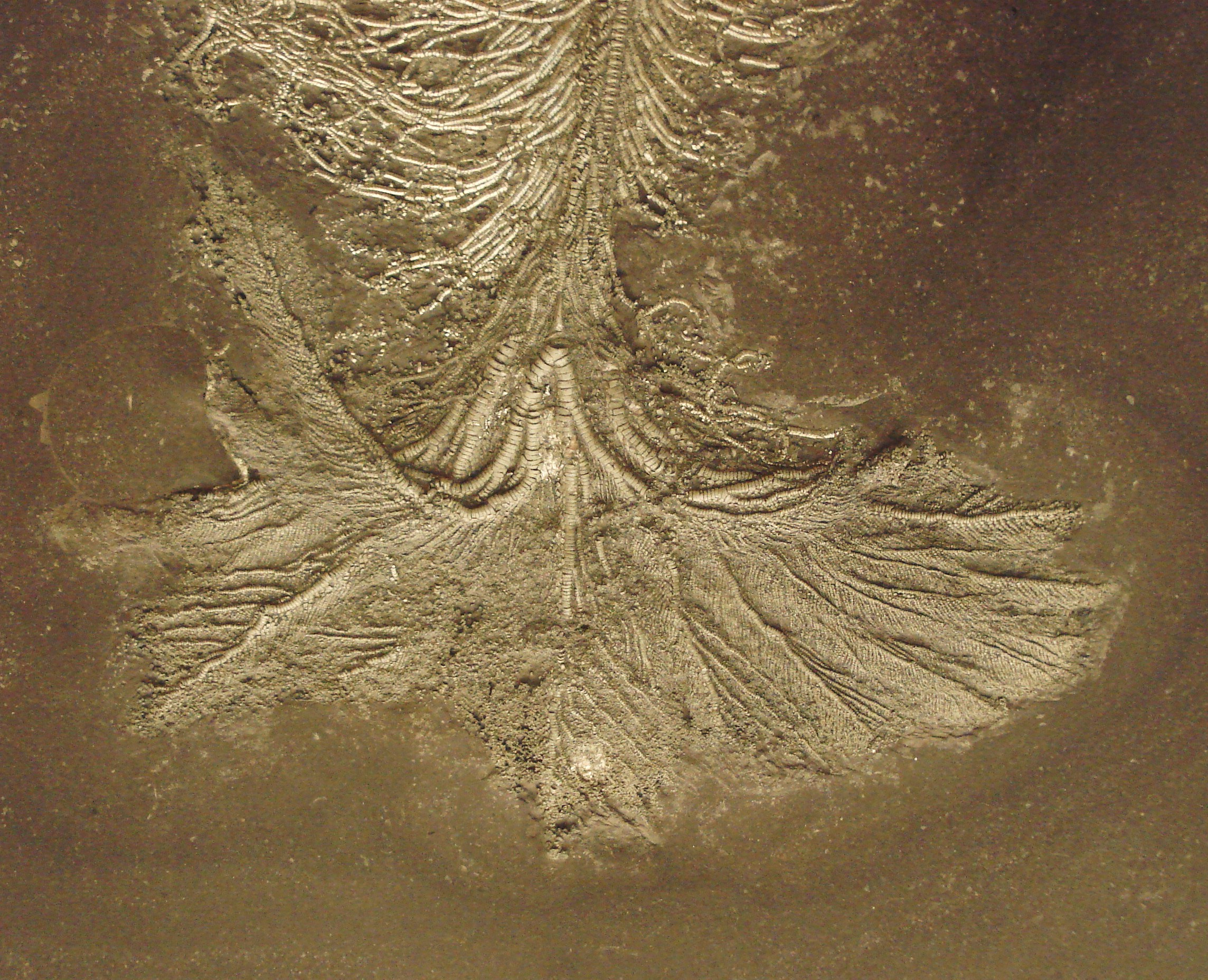
Pentacrinites dichotomus

Pentacrinites may have evolved from early, free living isocrinids, which occur today on the sea floor.

=== Reassigned species ===
- P. caputmedusae = Cenocrinus asterius
- P. subteres = Balanocrinus subteres
- P. subteroides = Balanocrinus subteroides

== Ecology ==
Pentacrinites is a floating sea lily that was attached to driftwood during its adult life. This pseudo-planktonic lifestyle enabled it to exploit food unavailable to other crinoids.

== Distribution ==
Pentacrinites became extinct and has left no direct living descendants. Its remains have been found in many different locations, suggesting it occurred throughout the world's oceans. Free living isocrinids however, still populate the seas, usually at over 150m deep.

- P. doreckae is known from the Lower Jurassic (Hettangian and Sinemurian).
- P. fossilis occurs in the Lower Jurassic (Sinemurian).
- P. dichotomus has been found in the Lower Jurassic (Toarcian).
- P. dargniesi was collected from the Middle Jurassic (Bajocian and Bathonian).

== Sources ==
- Fossils (Smithsonian Handbooks) by David Ward (Page 172)
