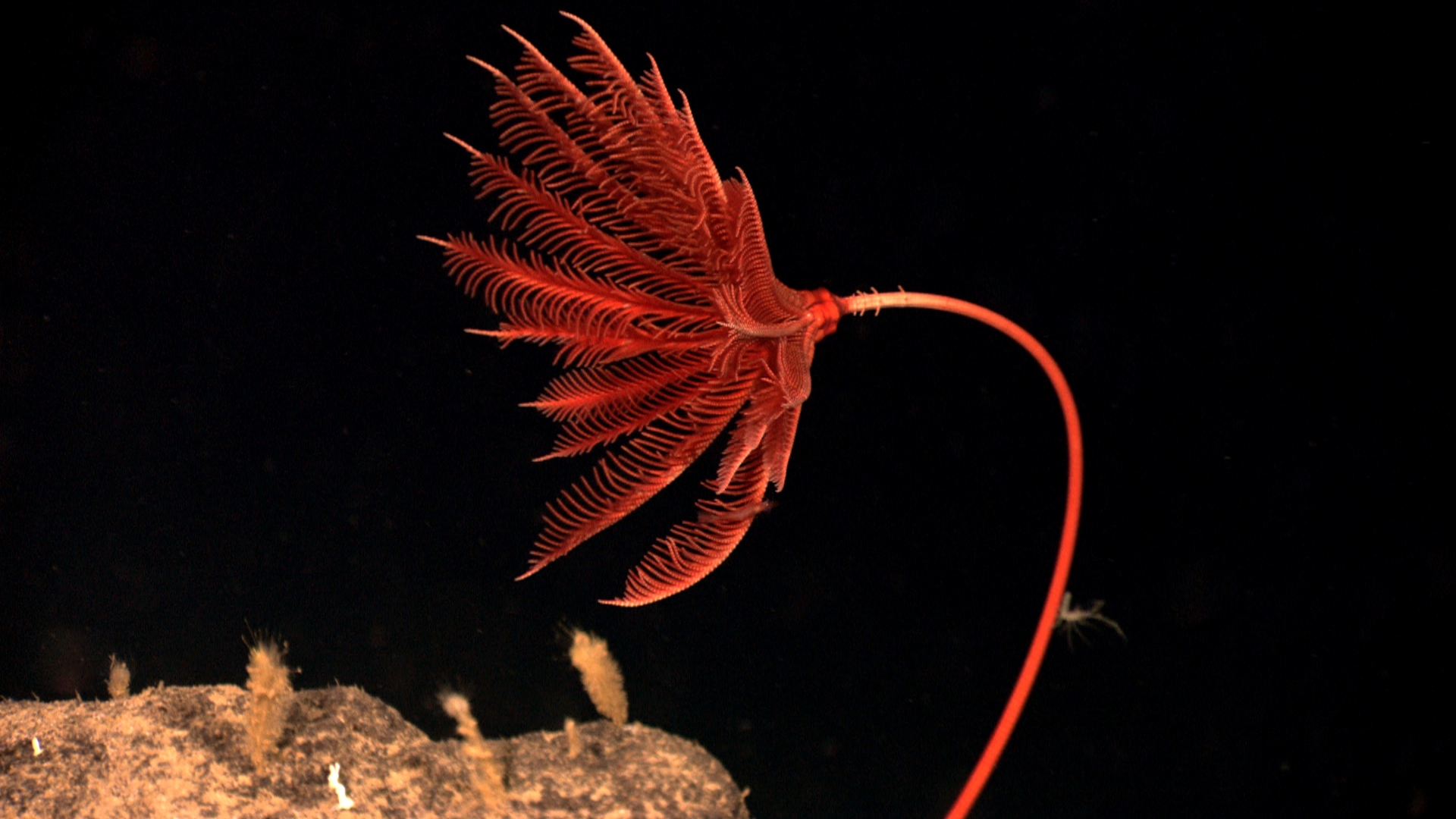

Scientific classification
- Kingdom: Animalia
- Phylum: Echinodermata
- Class: Crinoidea
- Superorder: Articulata
- Order: Isocrinida
- Family: Balanocrinidae
- Subfamily: Proisocrininae
- Genus: Proisocrinus; A.H. Clark, 1910
- Species: P. ruberrimus

Binomial name
- Proisocrinus ruberrimus A. H. Clark, 1910

= Proisocrinus =

Genus of crinoids

Proisocrinus ruberrimus is a species of crinoids that is in the monotypic genus Proisocrinus, which in turn is part of the subfamily Proisocrininae. This species is facultatively mobile, being able to crawl on the seabed using its oral arms.
