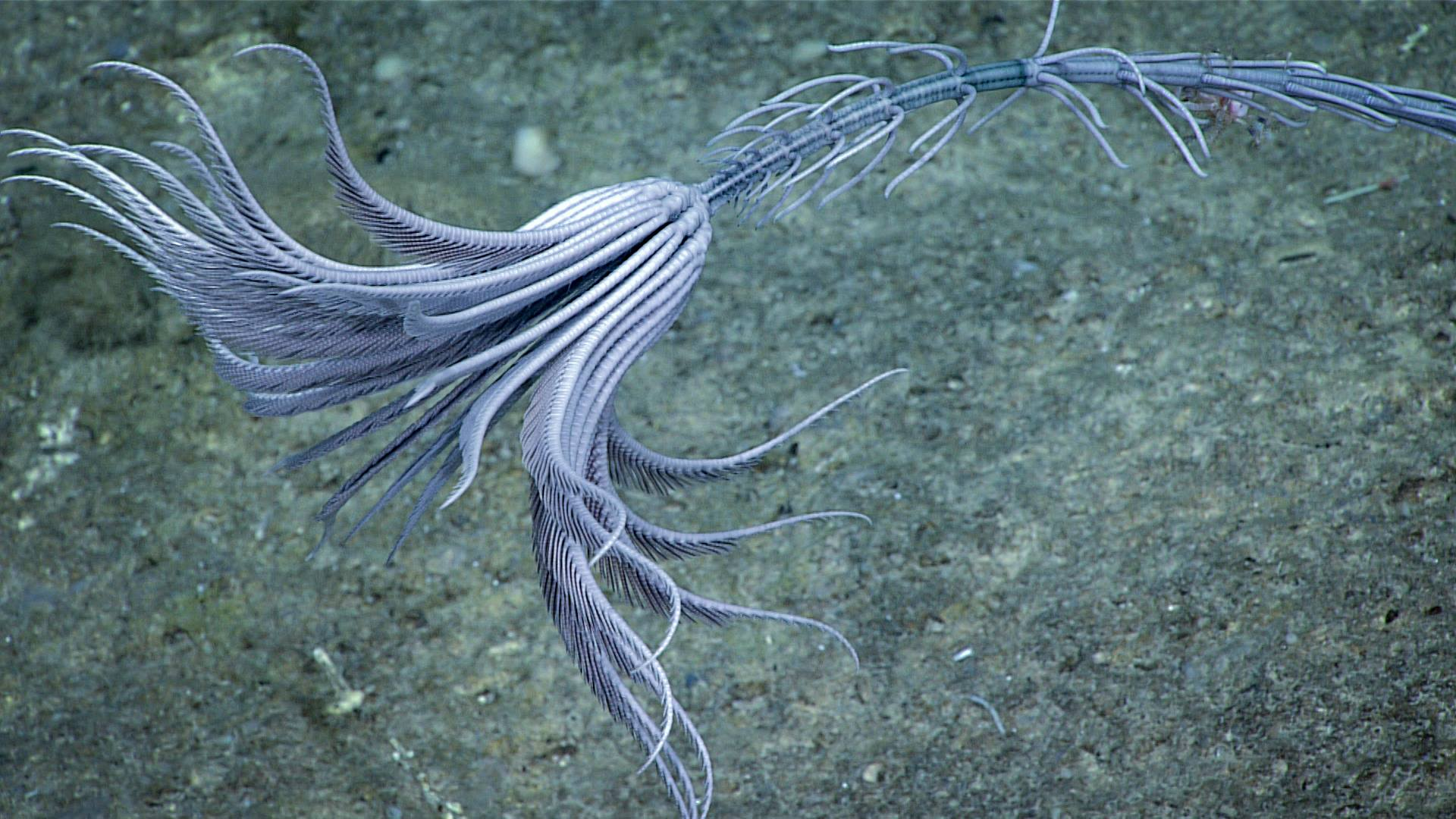
- Endoxocrinus sp.

Scientific classification
- Domain: Eukaryota
- Kingdom: Animalia
- Phylum: Echinodermata
- Class: Crinoidea
- Order: Isocrinida
- Family: Balanocrinidae
- Subfamily: Diplocrininae
- Genus: Endoxocrinus; Clark, 1908

Synonyms
- Diplocrinus Döderlein, 1912; Annacrinus Clark, 1923

= Endoxocrinus =

Genus of echinoderms

Endoxocrinus is a genus of echinoderms belonging to the family Balanocrinidae.

The species of this genus are found in Western Europe, America, Southeastern Asia and Australia.

Species:

- Endoxocrinus alternicirrus (Carpenter, 1882)
- Endoxocrinus maclearanus (Thomson, 1872)
- Endoxocrinus parrae (Gervais, 1835)
- Endoxocrinus sibogae Döderlein, 1907
- Endoxocrinus wyvillethomsoni (Thomson, 1872)
