= Cenocrinus =

Cenocrinus asterius
- Crown and top of stem

Scientific classification
- Kingdom: Animalia
- Phylum: Echinodermata
- Class: Crinoidea
- Superorder: Articulata
- Order: Isocrinida
- Family: Balanocrinidae
- Genus: Cenocrinus
- Species: C. asterius

Binomial name
- Cenocrinus asterius Carpenter, 1885

Synonyms
- Encrinus caputmedusae Lamarck, 1801; Isis asteria Linnaeus, 1767; Pentacrinites caputmedusae (Lamarck, 1801); Pentacrinus asteria (Linnaeus, 1767); Pentacrinus caputmedusa (Lamarck, 1801)

Genus of crinoids

Cenocrinus is a monotypic genus of stalked crinoids in the family Isselicrinidae. The great West Indian sea lily (Cenocrinus asterius) is the only species in the genus and is found in deep waters in the Caribbean Sea and Gulf of Mexico.

== Description ==
Like other sea lilies, Cenocrinus asterius has a crown consisting of a calyx surrounded by feathery arms splayed out to create a filtration fan. The crown is supported by a long slender stem which is attached to the substrate at its base. The stem is semi-rigid but flexible and is made up of disc-shaped ossicles known as columnals, joined together by ligaments. At each node between the columnals there is a whorl of five cirri. These are also articulated and are tipped with claws and when the cirri come into contact with other objects, they cling to them and help stabilise the sea lily and keep it upright.

== Distribution ==
Cenocrinus asterius is found in the Caribbean Sea, the Gulf of Mexico and off the coast of Mexico.

== Biology ==
Cenocrinus asterius lives on areas of the seabed with strong currents at depths of more than 100 metres (330 ft). This enables it to maximise the capture of food particles by the sticky tube feet on its arms without them being fouled by the collection of its own faecal matter.

Cenocrinus asterius has been studied in a laboratory flow tank where it was found that, with the base of the stem detached, it could move itself along the substrate and climb objects. It took as long as twenty four hours to manoeuvre itself into its usual, near vertical posture and reattach itself. In its natural surroundings, it may be assisted in this process by the hydrodynamic lift provided by a strong current in elevating its fan of arms. In studies by cameras mounted on submersibles, it has been found that sea lilies can drag themselves along the seabed by their arms. In the case of Cenocrinus asterius, this may be in response to attack by the sea urchin Calocidaris micans which has been shown to feed on live crinoids. Although the rate of movement was slow, it was sufficiently fast to outpace the echinoid. Autotomy of the stalk may also take place in an effort to evade the predator.

The sexes are separate in Cenocrinus asterius. Like other sea lilies, it produces gametes in specialised areas of the pinnules and releases them into the sea. After fertilisation, the eggs hatch into barrel-shaped doliolaria larvae. These have several bands of cilia which enable them to swim. The larvae are planktonic and after a few days settle on the seabed and undergo metamorphosis into juvenile sea lilies.
