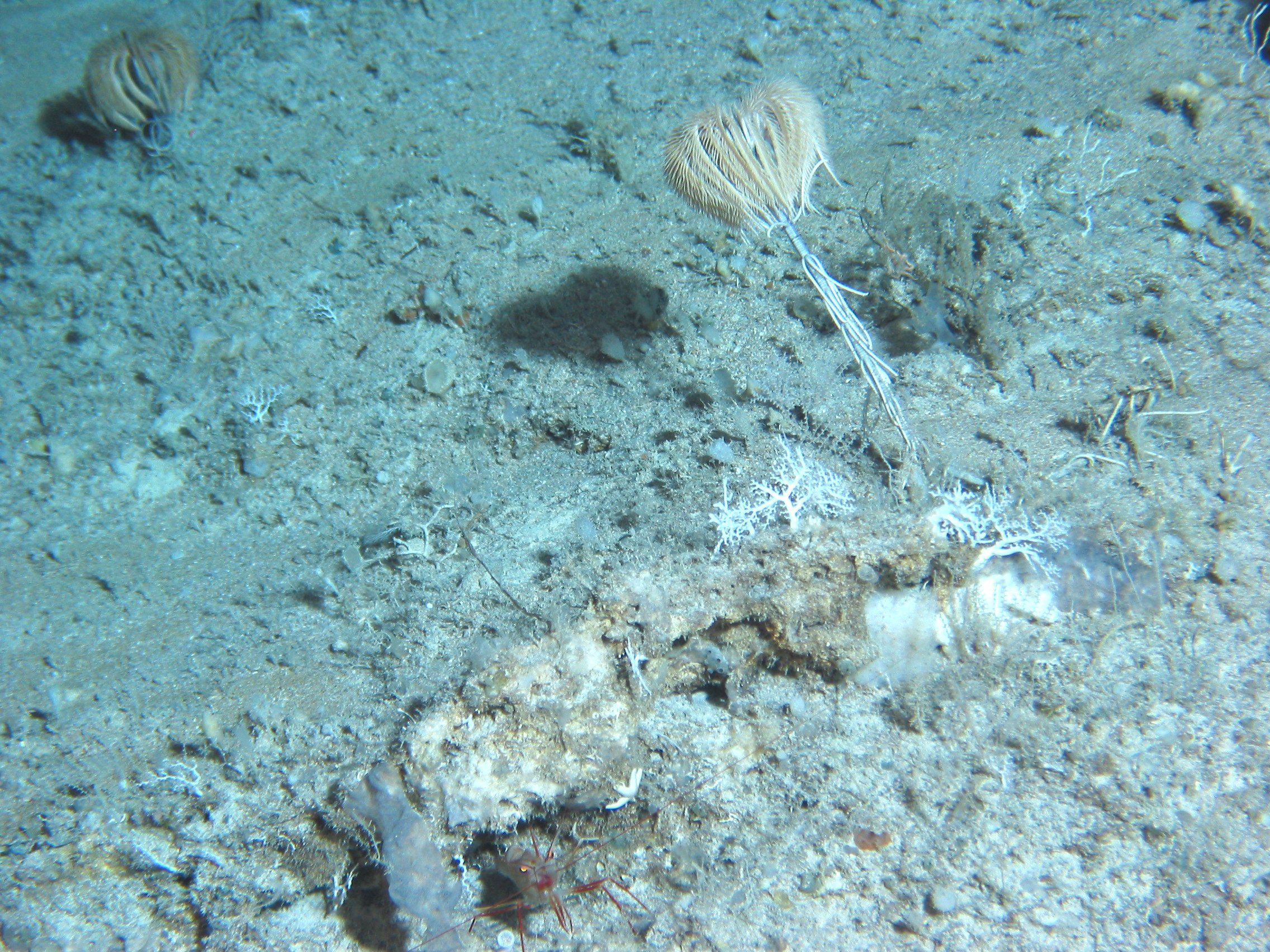

Scientific classification
- Kingdom: Animalia
- Phylum: Echinodermata
- Class: Crinoidea
- Order: Isocrinida
- Family: Balanocrinidae
- Genus: Endoxocrinus
- Species: E. parrae

Binomial name
- Endoxocrinus parrae (Gervais in Guérin, 1835)

= Endoxocrinus parrae =

Species of crinoid

Endoxocrinus parrae is a species of stalked crinoids of the family Balanocrinidae. It is the most commonly found isocrinine species in west Atlantic Ocean.

== Morphology ==
As members of the order Isocrinida, E. parrae possess a heteromorphic stalk that is made of calcareous nodal columns. Their body is mostly made of porous ossicles, with minimal soft tissue connecting the calcareous structure. The stalks can measure 50.5 cm in some subspecies, but average between 10.2 cm and 23.5 cm. The stalks average between 4–5mm in diameter, and are connected to between 23 and 58 feeding arms that branch off radially around the mouth and anus. While some subspecies of E. parrae possess arms with a smooth dorsal surface, others have been shown to exhibit a serrated dorsal surface, while others have shown morphology that is between the two characteristics, not quiet smooth but not fully serrated. Cirri allow the crinoid to attach itself to the sediment and continue upwards along the stalk.

== Distribution and habitat ==
Endoxocrinus parrae is found in benthic communities between 200–1000m deep in the western Atlantic Ocean, and Indo-West Pacific Ocean though it is most common between 500–600m. It has been found as far north as the Florida strait and as far south as Brazil, and is native to tropical benthic communities. E. parrae has been shown to grow at a more rapid rate in shallower depths due to temperature, but also exhibit less growth in areas without a strong flow of water. As E. parrae are filter feeders, a strong current is required for them to obtain necessary nutrients and energy for growth and survival. They are most commonly found in large groups along areas of good water flow, such as along ridges, boulders, and mounds. E. parrae have also been observed crawling along the sea floor from areas of low flow to higher flow.

== Feeding biology and behavior ==
As filter feeders, Endoxocrinus parrae use their large branching arms to collect food from the water column. About 60% of the gut content of E. parrae has been found to be detritus, suggesting that they mostly feed on marine snow and other particulate matter in the water column. While feeding, E. parrae will selectively feed on small, organic particles, and have been documented waving their arms in response to capturing large, inorganic particles. This waving action flings the particles away from the crinoid's mouth, keeping it clean.

Along the ocean floor, E. parrae is often preyed upon by pencil urchins such as Calocidaris micans. The stomachs of C. mican collected around E. parrae contained large amounts of crinoid stems and soft tissue. In response to this, Endoxocrinus parrae have been observed detaching itself and using its cirri to move across the bottom of the ocean away from the predator. In addition, it is believed that the crinoids offer part of their stem up to the pencil urchin, allowing it time to flee while the urchin feeds. E. parrae have reached speeds of up to 140 m per hour while crawling across the sea floor.

== Subspecies ==
While originally thought to be three separate species- Endoxocrinus parrae, Endoxocrinus prionedes, and Endoxocrinus carolinae, are now recognized as three subspecies of Endoxocrinus parrae. The speciation of E. parrae has been hypothesized to be a result of different environmental conditions.

- Endoxocrinus parrae parrae
- Endoxocrinus parrae prionedes
- Endoxocrinus parrae carolinae
