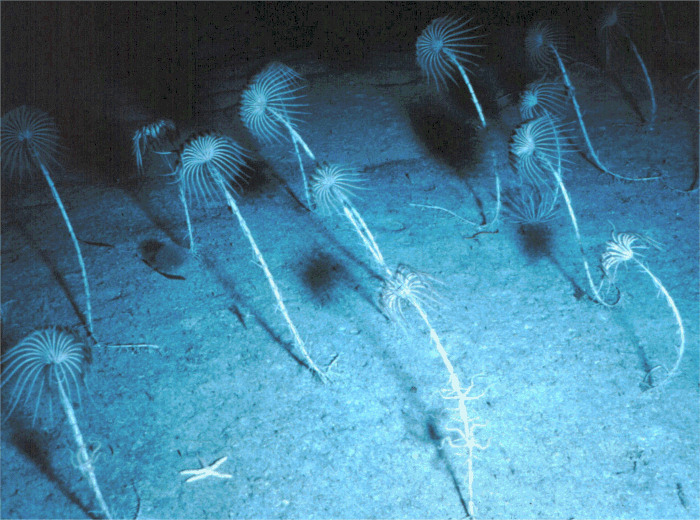
- Specimens in situ
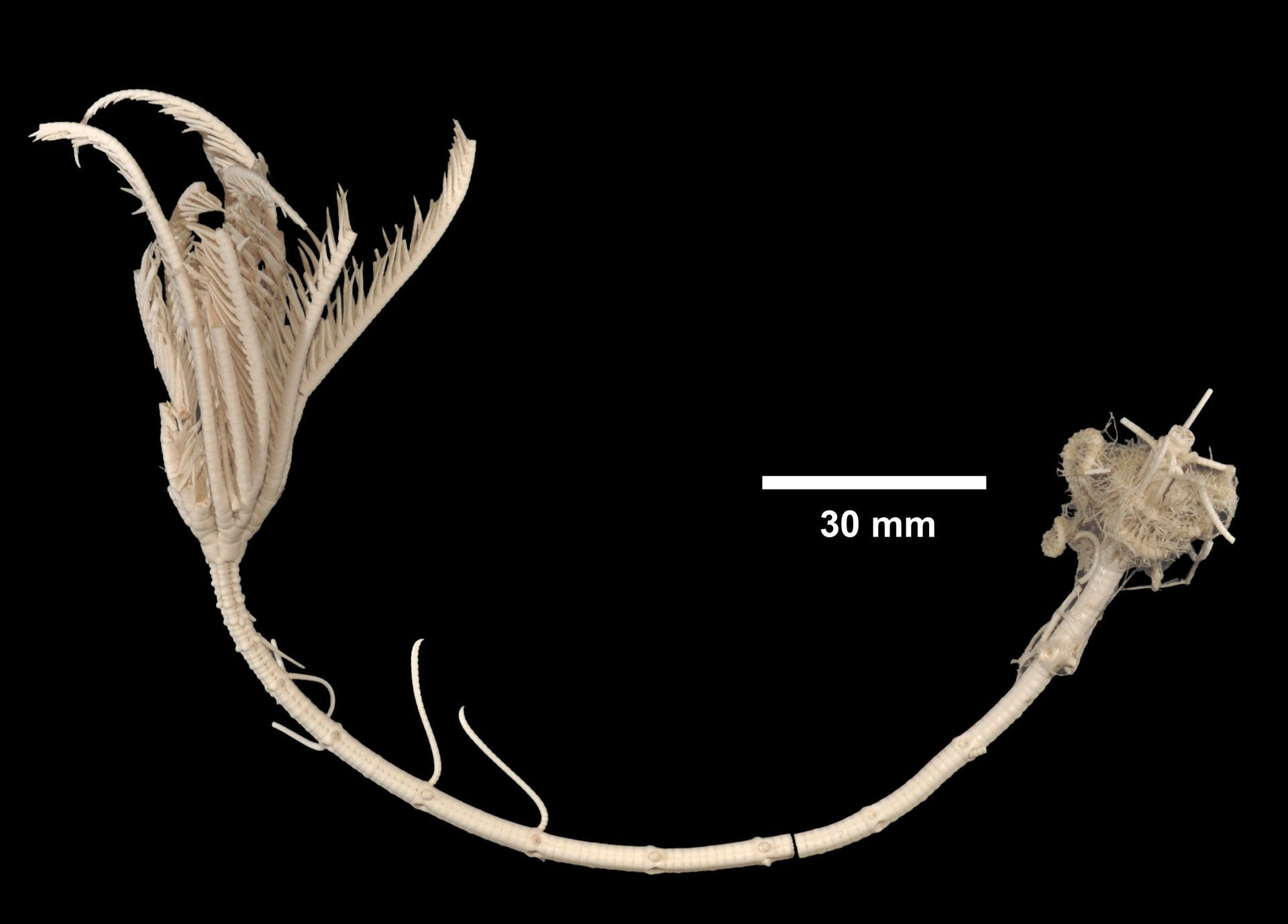
- Museum specimen

Scientific classification
- Kingdom: Animalia
- Phylum: Echinodermata
- Class: Crinoidea
- Superorder: Articulata
- Order: Isocrinida
- Family: Balanocrinidae
- Subfamily: Balanocrininae
- Genus: Neocrinus
- Species: N. decorus

Binomial name
- Neocrinus decorus (Thomson, 1864)

Synonyms
- Chladocrinus decorus Thomson, 1864; Pentacrinus decorus Thomson, 1864

= Neocrinus decorus =

Neocrinus decorus Temporal range: 23.03–Recent Ma

Species of crinoid

Neocrinus decorus is a species of stalked crinoid, or sea lily, in the family Balanocrinidae, being a member of the sole living genus of its subfamily.

== Distribution ==
The species lives on hard substrates (such as on lithoherm ridges) at depths of 420 to 1,219 metres (1,378 to 3,999 ft), throughout the Caribbean Sea and Gulf of Mexico. It has been found off the coast of Venezuela, Honduras, the Dominican Republic, and the Lesser Antilles.

== Biology ==
Neocrinus decorus are epibenthic and may form aggregations in certain locales. Like other crinoids, they are suspension feeders, filtering out organic material and plankton that the current brings to their outstretched arms (the "filtration fan"). This species has been observed to crawl across the sea floor using its arms, "elbow-crawling" at speeds of about 36 metres per hour (120 ft/h). This locomotion is theorized to allow the sea lily to move to a location with more appropriate currents, or to evade slower predators such as cidaroid sea urchins.
