= Cainocrinidae =

Scientific classification
- Domain: Eukaryota
- Kingdom: Animalia
- Phylum: Echinodermata
- Class: Crinoidea
- Order: Isocrinida
- Family: Cainocrinidae

Family of crinoids

Cainocrinidae is a family of echinoderms belonging to the order Isocrinida.

Genera:

- Nielsenicrinus Rasmussen, 1961
- Teliocrinus Döderlein, 1912
