= Hertha Doreck =

German paleontologist (1889–1991)

Hertha Walburga Doris Sieverts-Doreck
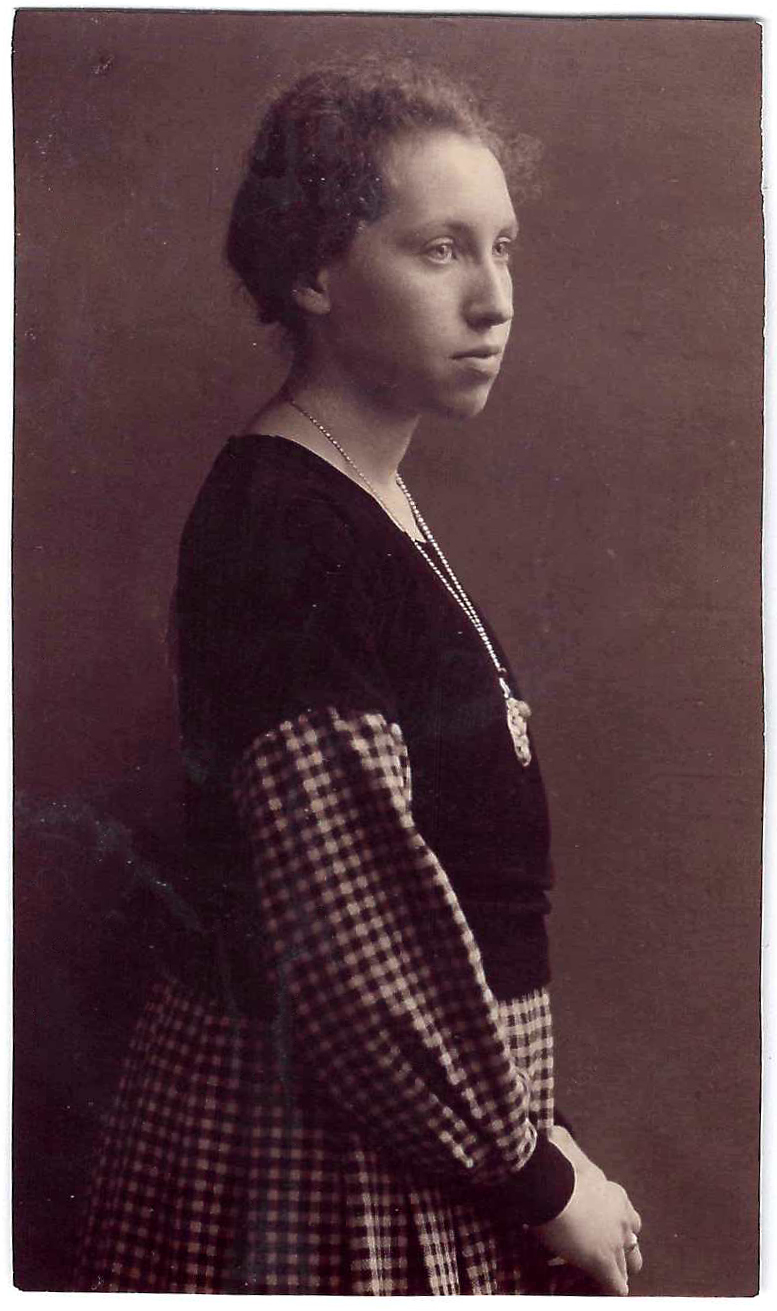
- Portrait of Hertha Sieverts-Doreck, January 1921
- Born: 15 July 1899; Völklingen, German Empire
- Died: 30 March 1991 (aged 91–92); Wiesbaden, Germany
- Resting place: Stuttgart, Germany
- Education: Städtischen Oberrealschule Steglitz; University of Berlin (Ph.D.)
- Spouse: Walter Doreck
- Children: Adelheid Mack, Sabine Funk
- Scientific career
- Fields: Paleontology
- Workplaces: Prussian National Geological Institute
- Doctoral advisor: Josef Felix Pompeckj

Hertha Sieverts-Doreck, née Sieverts (15 July 1889 – 30 March 1991), was a German paleontologist who studied and published her research about the marine animals called Cretaceous Crinoids. She often published her research under the name Hertha Sieverts-Doreck.

== Life ==
Hertha Walburga Doris Sieverts-Doreck was born in Völklingen, German Empire, in 1899, the eldest of three daughters born to a chemist father.

=== Education ===
She trained as a teacher for schools in Prussia, but she became interested in mathematics and the natural sciences. Doreck focused on zoology, paleontology and geology during her time at the University of Berlin and she researched Cretaceous Crinoids for her dissertation, which she completed under the supervision of Josef Felix Pompeckj in 1927.

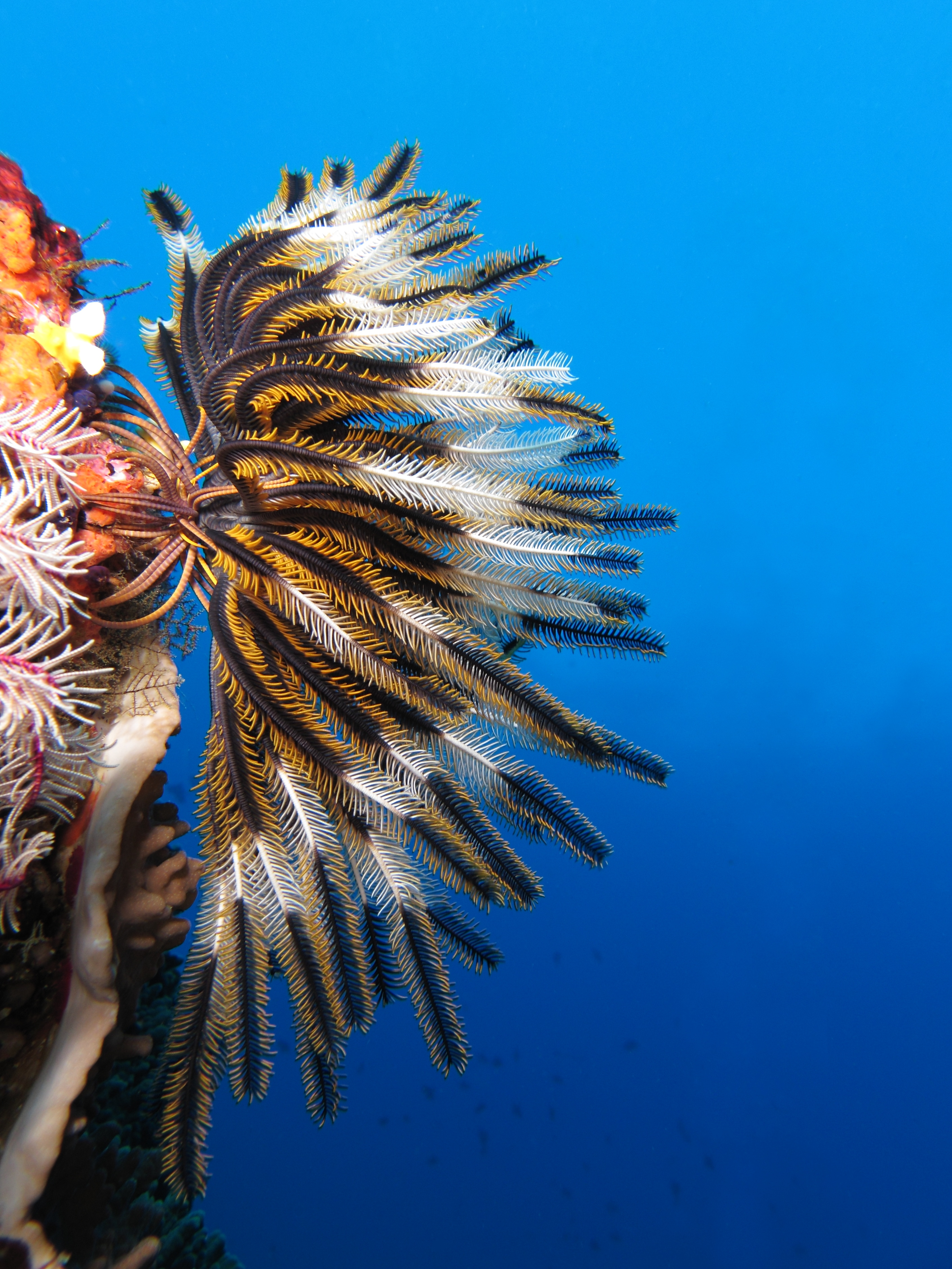
Crinoid on the reef of Batu Moncho Island in Komodo National Park, Indonesia.

=== Research ===
After she was only able to find a series of short-term positions, she was finally hired at the Institute for Applied Geology in Bonn at a very low salary in 1930. Although she mostly worked as a personal assistant to J. Wanner, she was allowed to work with the fossil collection. After five years, she got a training opportunity at the National Prussian Geological Institute in Berlin and was hired there in 1936 in the role of a scientific assistant. This job entailed mapping and fieldwork; it was unusual for a woman to perform such work at that time.

=== Private research ===
Her public employment ended in 1936 when she married Walter Doreck and assumed the role of private-researcher. The couple had two daughters, yet Hertha continued her active research efforts, publishing her results on Crinoids in the journal Zentralblatt for fourteen years.

R.C. Moore invited Doreck to his facilities in Lawrence, Kansas, where she assumed the role of the 'German Crinoid Expert.' According to Ogilvie, "She had devised a system of classification for Mesozoic Crinoids that, although never published, was and still is the basis for the systematics of this group. During the last years of her research, Doreck turned to the systematics of the Holothuroideans."

When her husband became seriously ill, Doreck took care of him until his death in 1972. She died on 30 March 1991.

== Honors ==
The Paleontological Society named Doreck an honorary member in 1987 because of her contributions to the field.

== Selected publications ==
- Sieverts-Doreck, Hertha. "Zur Kenntnis der Crinoidengattung Discometra (Comatulida, Mariametrina) im Miozän des Wiener Beckens." Annalen des Naturhistorischen Museums in Wien (1960): 105-126.
- Sieverts-Doreck, Hertha. "Echinodermen aus dem spanischen Ober-Karbon." Paläontologische Zeitschrift 24, no. 1-2 (1951): 104-119.
- Sieverts-Doreck, Hertha. "Über Cyclocystoides Salter & Billings und eine neue Art aus dem belgischen und rheinischen Devon." Senckenbergiana 32, no. 1/4 (1951): 9-30.
- Sieverts-Doreck, Hertha. "Crinoiden aus dem Unterkarbon des Oberharzes." Neues Jahrbuch für Geologie und Paläontologie, Abhandlungen 93 (1951): 23-116.
