= Josef Felix Pompeckj =

German paleontologist and geologist (1867–1930)

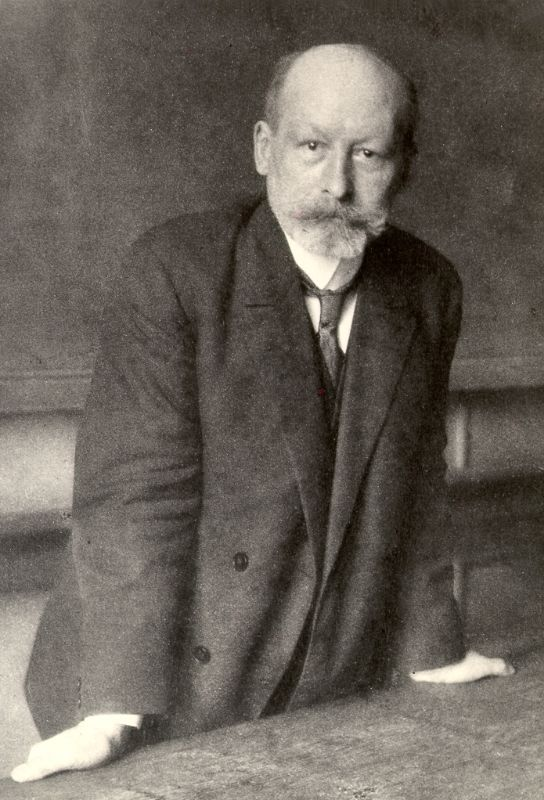
Josef Felix Pompeckj (circa 1920)

Josef Felix Pompeckj (May 10, 1867, Groß-Köllen – July 8, 1930, Berlin) was a German paleontologist and geologist.

He was born in Groß-Köllen, Kingdom of Prussia (now Kolno in Poland). He studied geology and paleontology at the University of Königsberg, receiving his doctorate in 1890 with the thesis Die Trilobitenfauna der ost- und westpreußischen Diluvialgeschiebe. In 1903, he became an associate professor at the Ludwig-Maximilians-Universität München, and from 1904, he taught classes in geology and mineralogy at Hohenheim Agricultural Academy.

In 1907, he relocated to the University of Göttingen, where he eventually became a full professor of geology and paleontology. From 1913, he worked as a professor at the University of Tübingen, then in 1917 moved to the Friedrich Wilhelm University of Berlin as successor to Wilhelm von Branca. At the Friedrich WIlhelm University of Berlin, he was appointed director of Geologisch-Paläontologischen Institut und Museum where one of his doctoral students was Hertha Doreck.

== Selected publications ==
- Pompeckj JF. Ueber Aucellen und Aucellen-ähnliche Formen. Neues Jahrbuch für Mineralogie, Geologie und Paläontologie. 1881
- Pompeckj JF. Uber Ammonoideen mit anormaler Wohnkammer. Jahreshefte des Vereins für Vaterländische Naturkunde, 1884
- Pompeckj JF. Die Fauna des Cambriums von Tejřovic und Skrej in Böhmen. Jahrbuch der Geologischen Reichsanstalt, 1896
- Pompeckj JF. Uber Calymene Brongniart. Neues Jahrbüch für Mineralogie, 1898
- Pompeckj JF. Marines Mesozoikum von König Karls Land. Stockholm, Vet.-Akad. Öfvers., Arg, 1899
- Pompeckj JF. Pompeckj JF. Jura-Fossilien aus Alaska. Verhandlungen der Kaiserlichen Russischen Mineralogischen Gesellschaft zu St. Petersburg. Zweite Serie. Bd.XXXVIII. Nr.1. 239-282. 1900 PDF
- Pompeckj JF. Die Juraablagerungen zwischen Regensburg und Regenstauf. Geogn. Jahrb, 1901
- Pompeckj JF. Ueber Aucellen und Aucellen-ähnliche Formen.—Neues Jahrb. f. Min., Geol. u. Palaeontol. Bd XIV
- Pompeckj JF. Aus dem Tremadoc der Montagne Noire (Süd-Frankreich). Neues Jahrbuch für Mineralogie, Geologie und Palaontologie, 1902
- Pompeckj JF. Die zoogeographischen Beziehungen zwischen den Jurameeren NW-und S-Deutschlands. J.-Ber. nieders. geol. Ver., Hannover, 1908
- Pompeckj JF. Über einen Fund von Mosasaurier-Resten im Ober-Senon von Haldem. 1910
- Pompeckj JF. Zur Rassenpersistenz der Ammoniten. Jahresbericht des Niedersachischen Geologischen Vereins, 1910
- Pompeckj JF. Amphineura-Palaontologie. Handworterbuch der Naturwissenschaften, 1912
- Pompeckj JF. Das Meer des Kupferschiefers. Sonderabdruck aus der Branca-Festschrift. (Leipzig, Gebrüder Borntraeger, 1914).
- Pompeckj JF. Die Bedeutung des Schwäbischen Jura für die Erdgeschichte. Stuttgart, 1914
- Kupferschiefer und Kupferschiefermeer. Zeitschrift der Deutschen Gesellschaft für Geowissenschaften, Band 72. p. 329-339
- Pompeckj JF. Das Ohrskelett von Zeuglodon. Senckenbergiana, 1922
- Pompeckj JF. Ammoniten des Rhät
- Pompeckj JF. Ein neues Zeugnis uralten Lebens. Paläontologische Zeitschrift 9: 287–313. 1927
- Schuchert C, LeVene CM, Pompeckj JF. Brachiopoda:(generum et genotyporum index et bibliographia). 1929 W. Junk, Berlin
