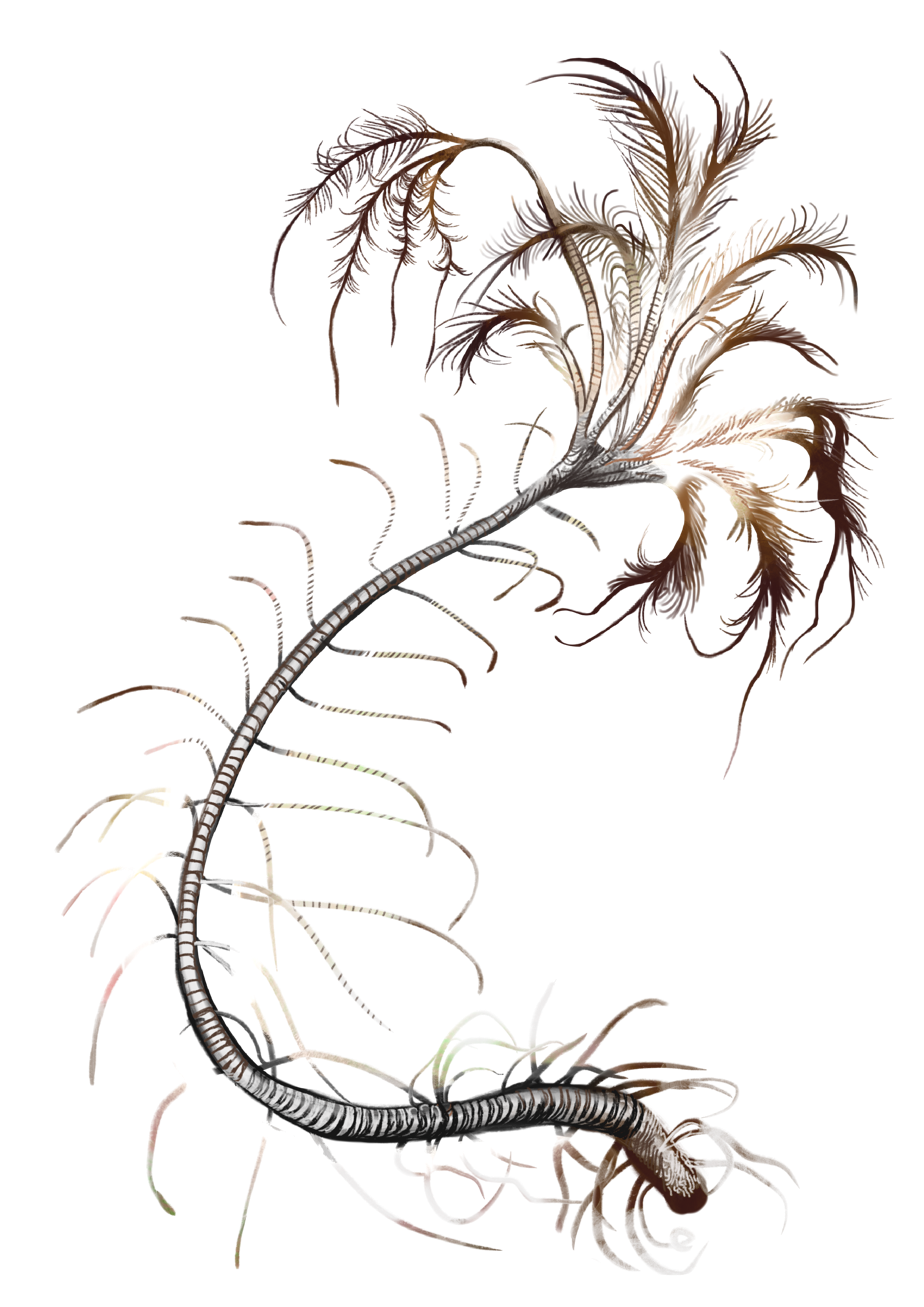
- Metacrinus rotundus

Scientific classification
- Kingdom: Animalia
- Phylum: Echinodermata
- Class: Crinoidea
- Superorder: Articulata
- Order: Isocrinida
- Suborder: Isocrinina
- Family: Isocrinidae; Gislén, 1924

= Isocrinidae =

Isocrinidae Temporal range: Triassic–Present

Family of crinoids

Isocrinidae is one of four extant families of crinoids in the order Isocrinida.

== Classification ==
Family Isocrinidae

- Subfamily †Isocrininae Gislén, 1924
  - Genus †Chariocrinus Hess, 1972
  - Genus †Hispidocrinus Simms, 1988
  - Genus †Isocrinus von Meyer in Agassiz, 1836
    - Subgenus †Isocrinus (Chladocrinus) (Agassiz, 1836)
  - Genus †Percevalicrinus Klikushin, 1977
  - Genus †Raymondicrinus Klikushin, 1982
  - Genus †Tyrolecrinus Klikushin, 1982
- Subfamily Metacrininae Klikushin, 1977
  - Genus †Eometacrinus Baumiller & Gaździcki, 1996
  - Genus Metacrinus P. H. Carpenter, 1884
  - Genus Saracrinus A. H. Clark, 1923
