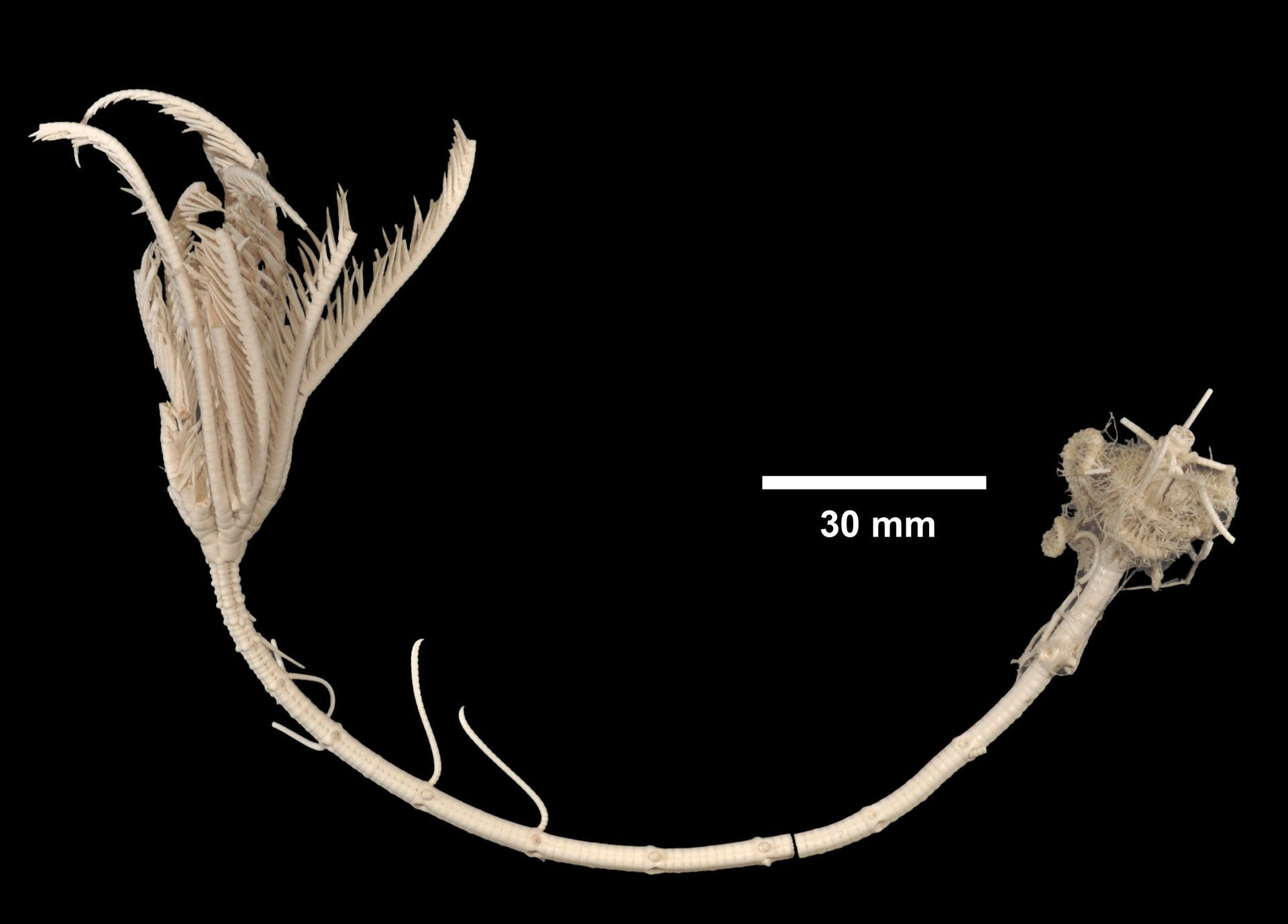
- Neocrinus decorus; YPM

Scientific classification
- Kingdom: Animalia
- Phylum: Echinodermata
- Class: Crinoidea
- Order: Isocrinida
- Family: Balanocrinidae; Roux, 1981

= Balanocrinidae =

Family of crinoids

Balanocrinidae is one of four extant families of crinoids in the order Isocrinida, though most of its members are only known from the fossil record.

== Subfamilies and genera ==
Family Balanocrinidae Roux, 1981

- Subfamily Balanocrininae Roux, 1981
  - Genus †Balanocrinus Agassiz in Desor, 1845
  - Genus †Cainocrinus Forbes, 1852
  - Genus †Laevigatocrinus Klikushin, 1979
  - Genus Neocrinus Thomson, 1864
  - Genus †Papacrinus Roux & Philippe, 2021
  - Genus †Singularocrinus Klikushin, 1982
- Subfamily Diplocrininae Roux, 1981
  - Genus †Doreckicrinus Rasmussen, 1961
  - Genus Endoxocrinus AH Clark, 1908
    - Subgenus Endoxocrinus (Diplocrinus) Döderlein, 1912
  - Genus †Nielsenicrinus Rasmussen, 1961
  - Genus Teliocrinus Döderlein, 1912
- Subfamily Isselicrininae Klikushin, 1977
  - Genus †Isselicrinus Rovereto, 1914
  - Genus Panglaocrinus Améziane, Eléaume & Roux, 2023
  - Genus †Praeisselicrinus Klikushin, 1977
- Subfamily Proisocrininae Rasmussen, 1978
  - Genus †Austinocrinus De Loriol, 1889
  - Genus Proisocrinus AH Clark, 1910
- Subfamily incertae sedis
  - Genus Cenocrinus Thomson, 1864
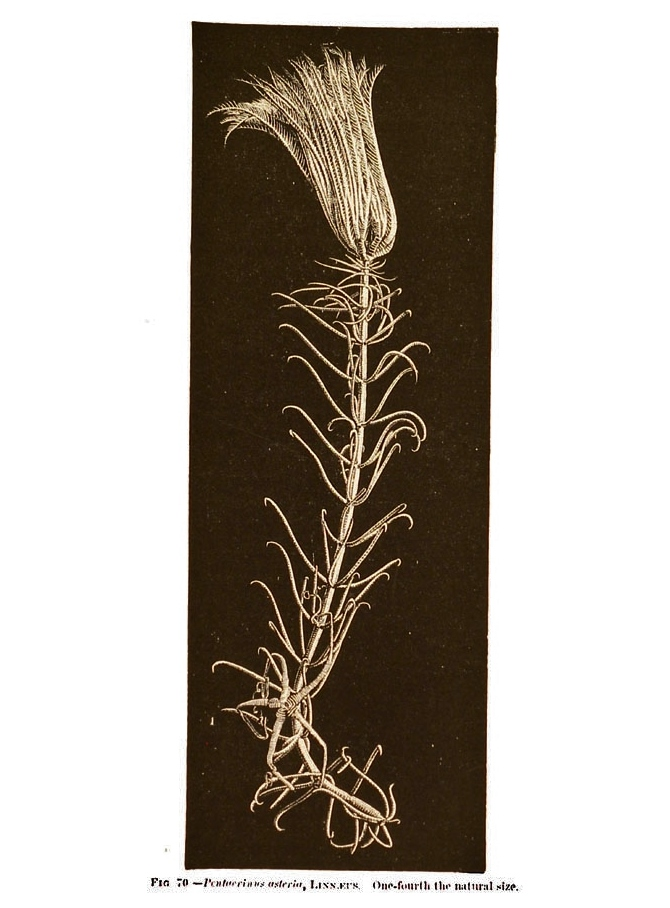
Cenocrinus asterius

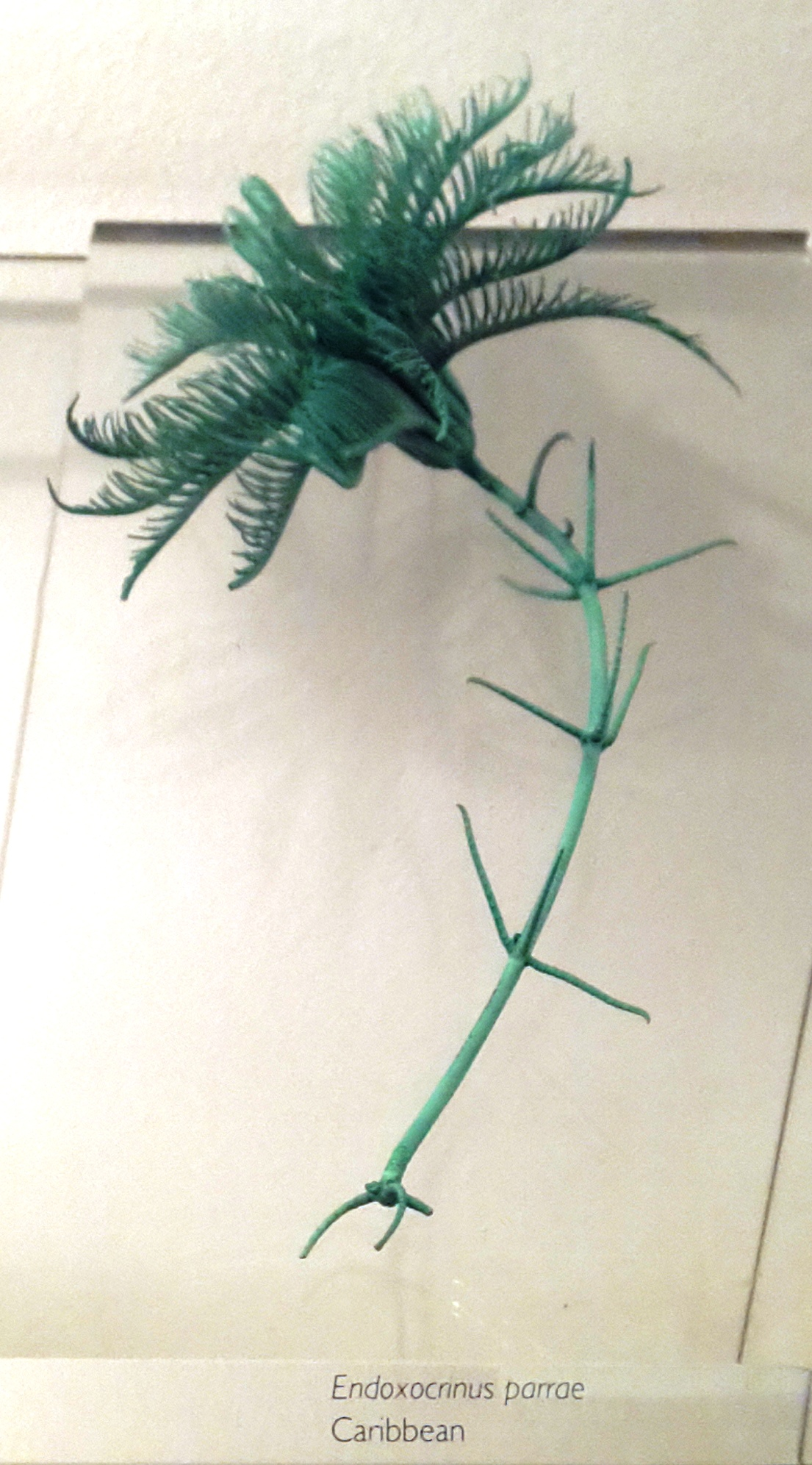
Endoxocrinus parrae

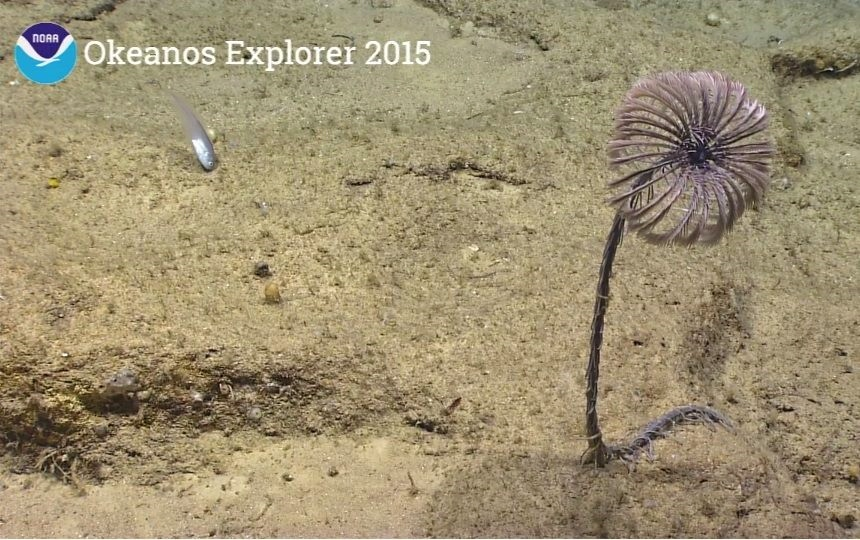
Endoxocrinus sp.

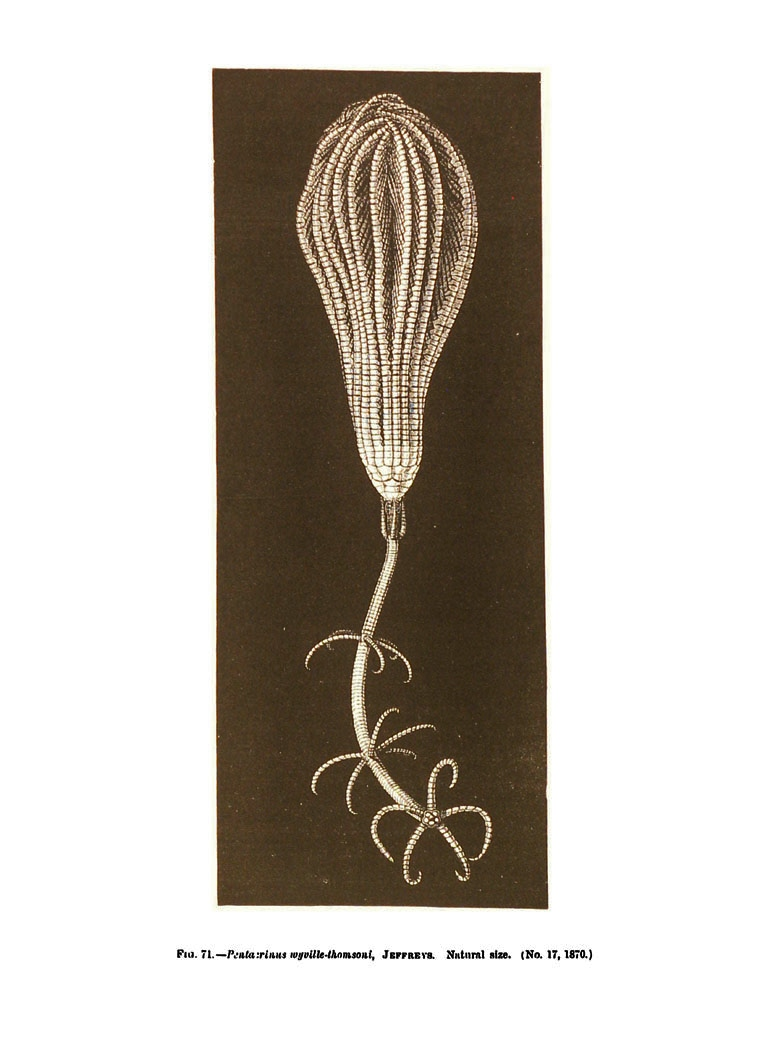
Endoxocrinus wyvillethomsoni

Isselicrinus buchii fossil; 3D MRI

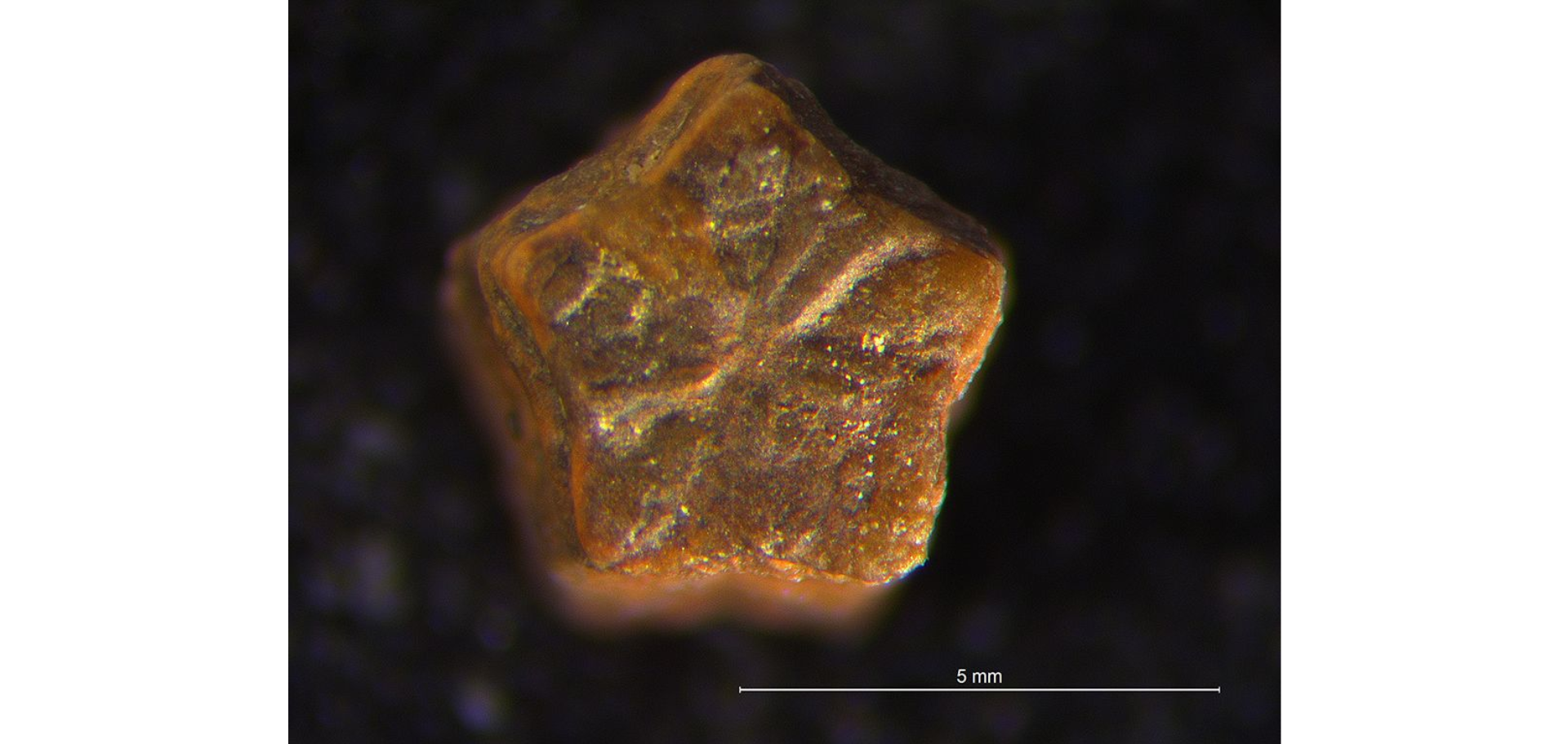
Isselicrinus sp.; fossil stalk fragment

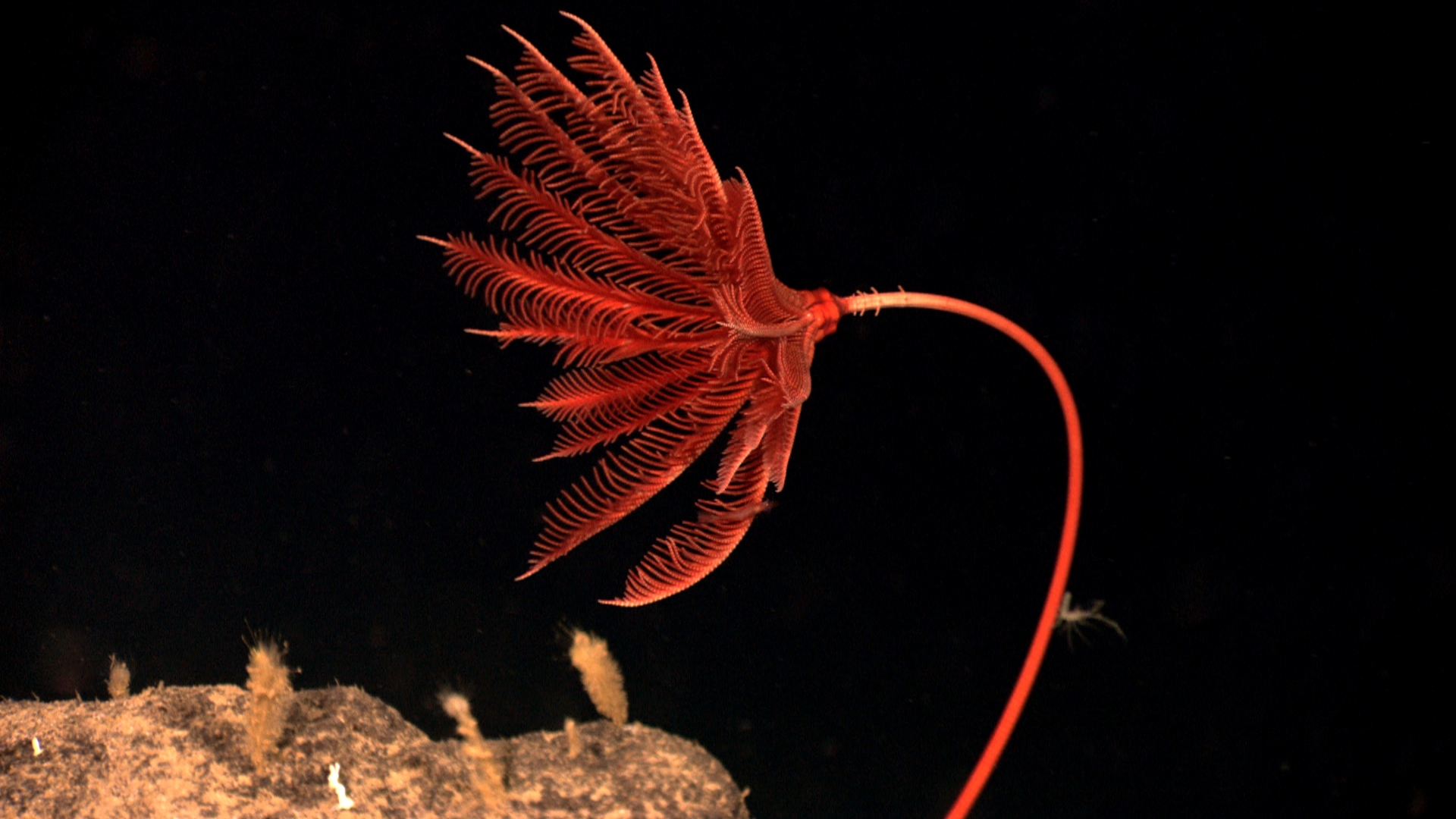
Proisocrinus ruberrimus

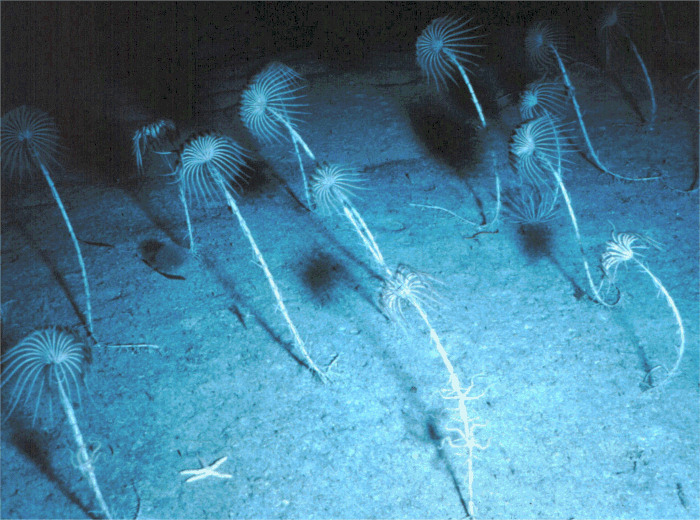
Aggregation of Neocrinus decorus, Gulf of Mexico
