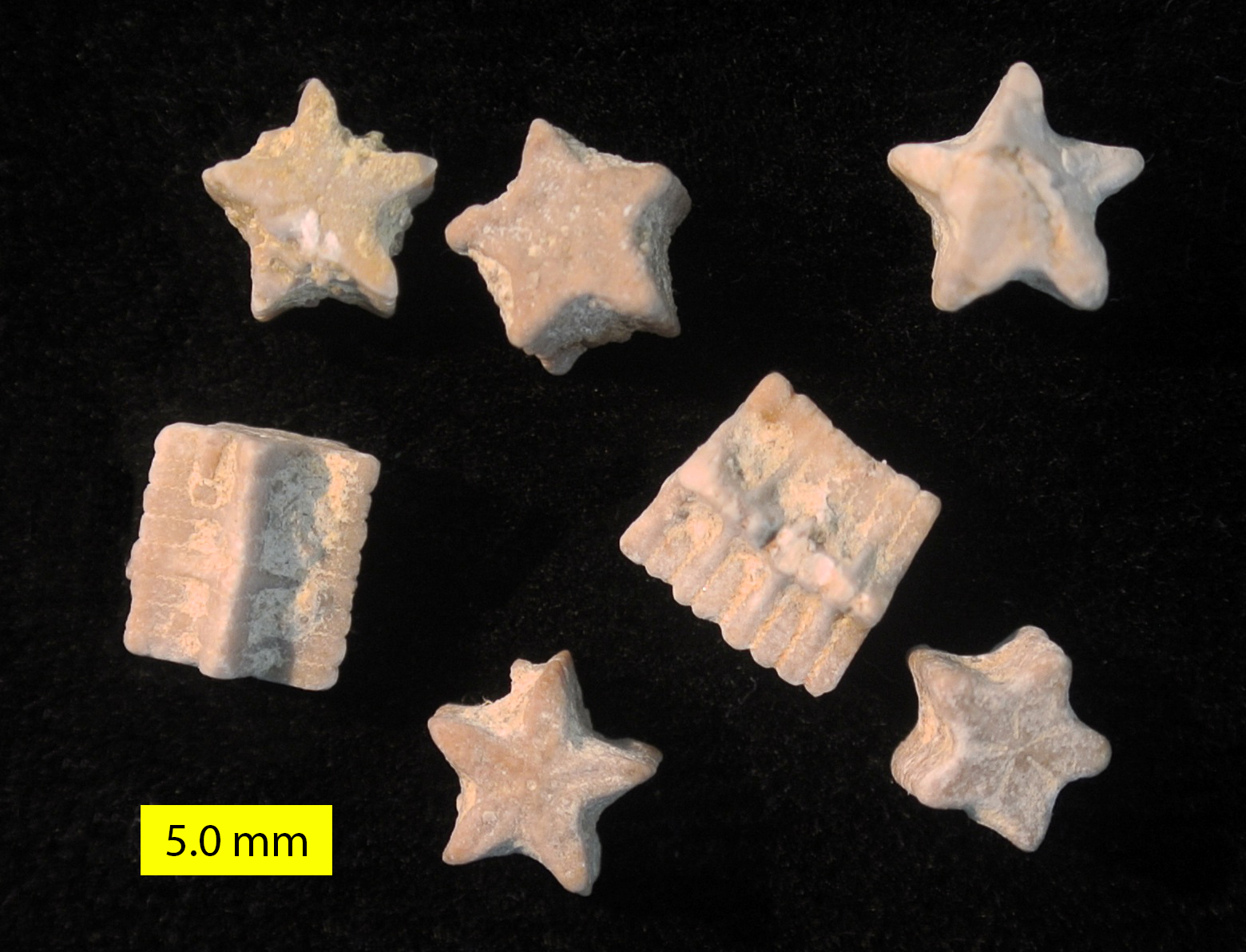
- Isocrinus nicoleti columnals; Middle Jurassic; Carmel Formation; Utah.

Scientific classification
- Kingdom: Animalia
- Phylum: Echinodermata
- Class: Crinoidea
- Subclass: Articulata
- Order: Isocrinida

Synonyms
- Isocrinina Sieverts-Doreck, 1952

= Isocrinida =

Isocrinida Temporal range: Anisian to Recent

Order of crinoids

Isocrinida is an order of sea lilies which contains four families.

== Characteristics ==
Members of this order are characterised by having a "heteromorphic" stalk; the stalk consists of a series of nodes with cirri, interspersed by several nodes without cirri. There are additionally a whorl of cirri at the base on which the animal perches. The calyx is a shallow cup consisting of five basals and five radials.

They are more mobile than other stalked crinoids, and can be found as shallow as 100–170 m (300–600 ft), and on rare occasions below 400 m (1,300 ft), but is most common at depths of 200–300 m (700–1,000 ft).

== Families ==
Ordo Isocrinida

- Family Balanocrinidae Roux, 1981
  - Subfamily Balanocrininae Roux, 1981
  - Subfamily Diplocrininae Roux, 1981
  - Subfamily Isselicrininae Klikushkin, 1977
  - Subfamily Proisocrininae Rasmussen, 1978
- Family Cainocrinidae Simms, 1988
- Family Isocrinidae Gislén, 1924
  - Subfamily Isocrininae Gislén, 1924
  - Subfamily Metacrininae Klikushin, 1977
- Family †Pentacrinitidae Gray, 1842
  - Subfamily Eocomatulinae Simms, 1988
  - Subfamily Pentacrinitinae Blumenbach, 1804
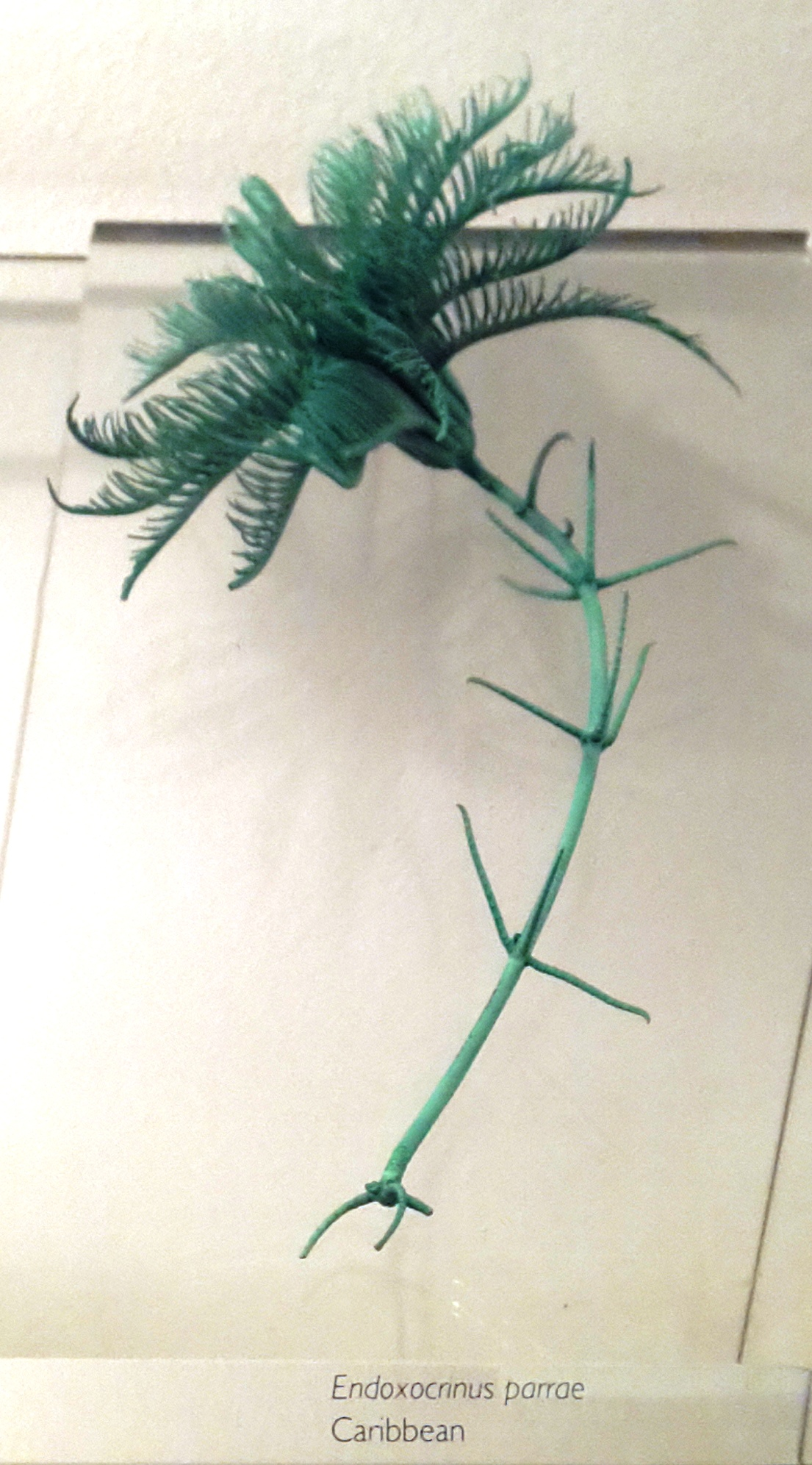
Endoxocrinus parrae (Balanocrinidae)

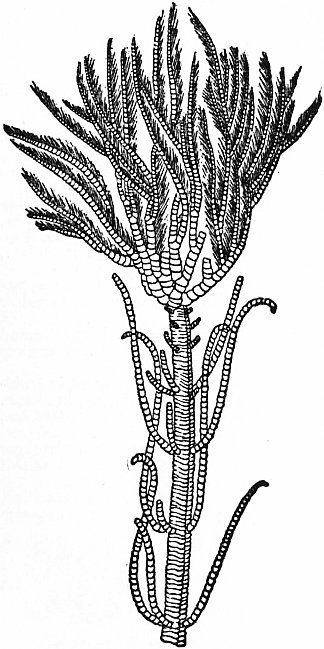
Isocrinus asteria

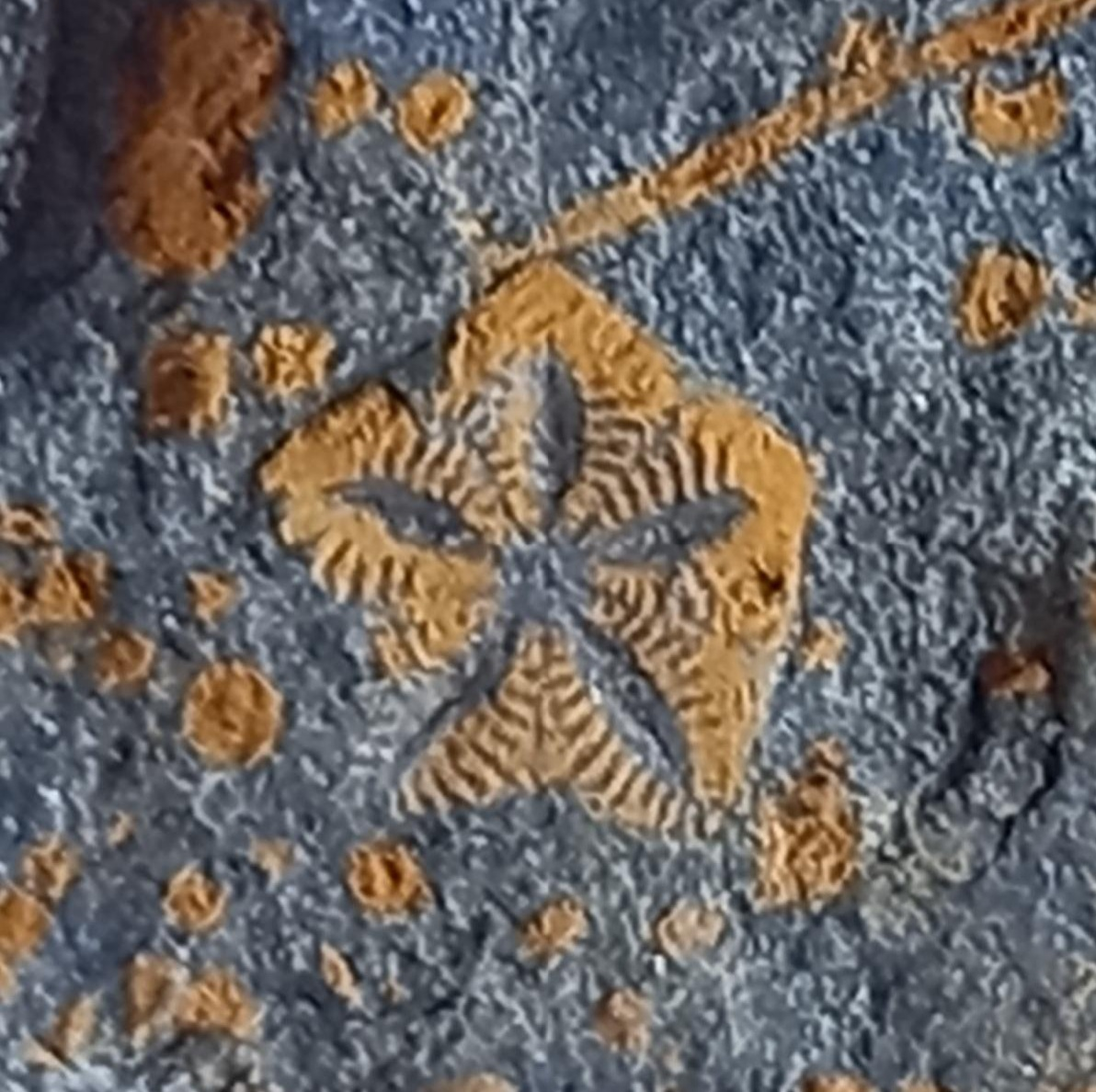
Isocrinus fossil, Shamshak Formation, Alborz province, Iran

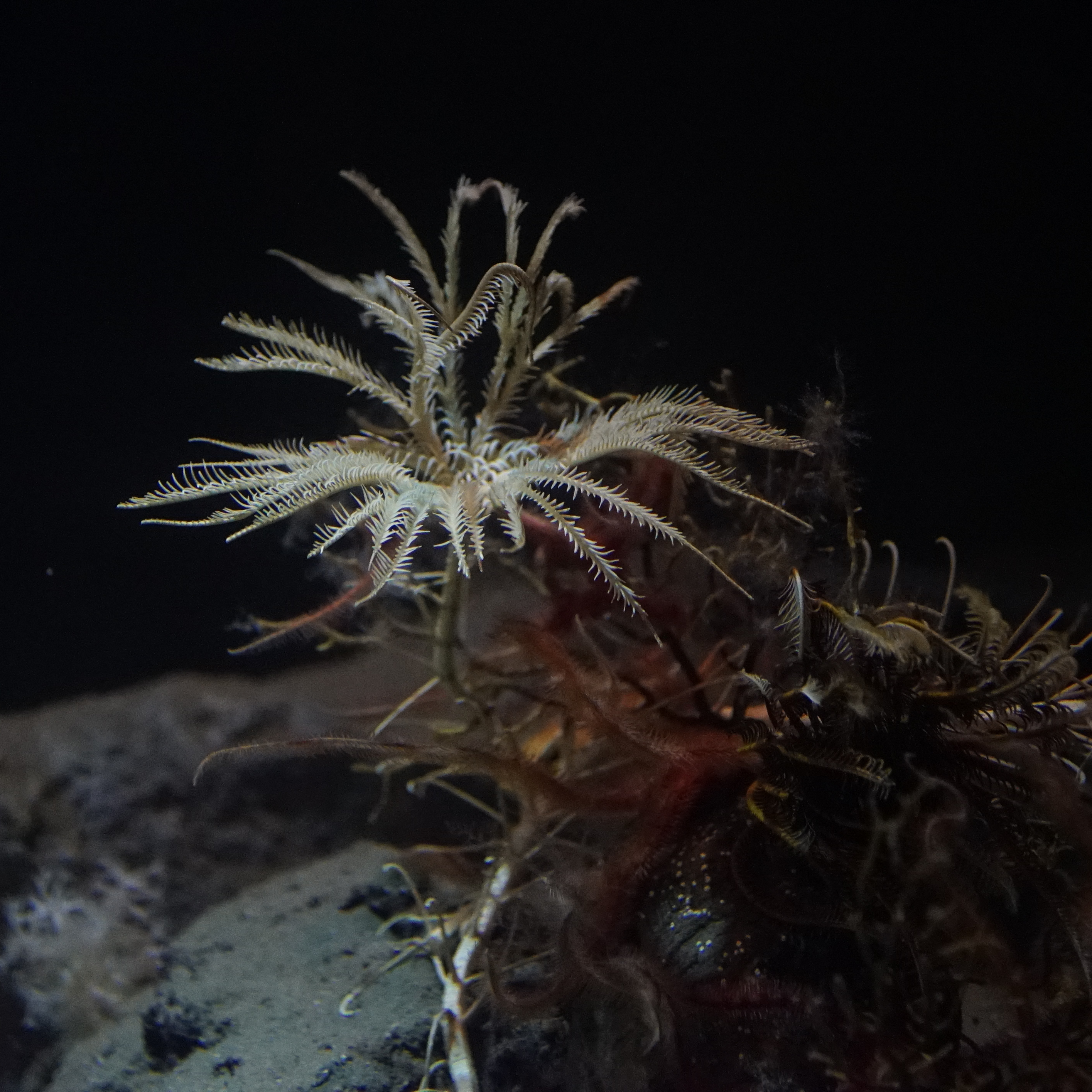
Metacrinus rotundus (Isocrinidae)

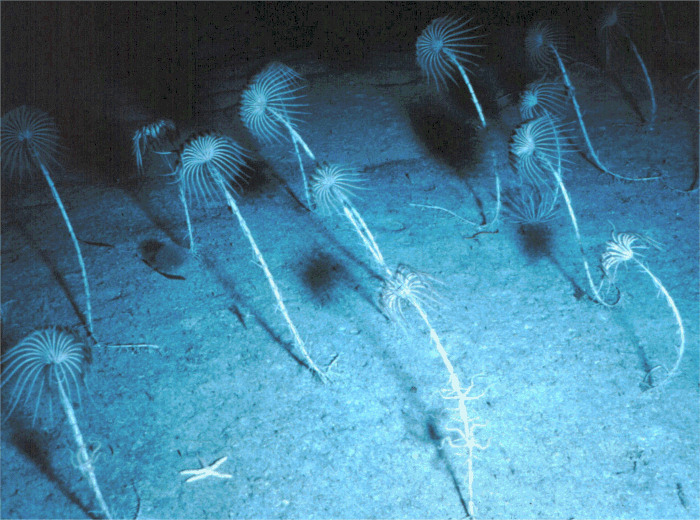
Neocrinus decorus (Balanocrinidae)

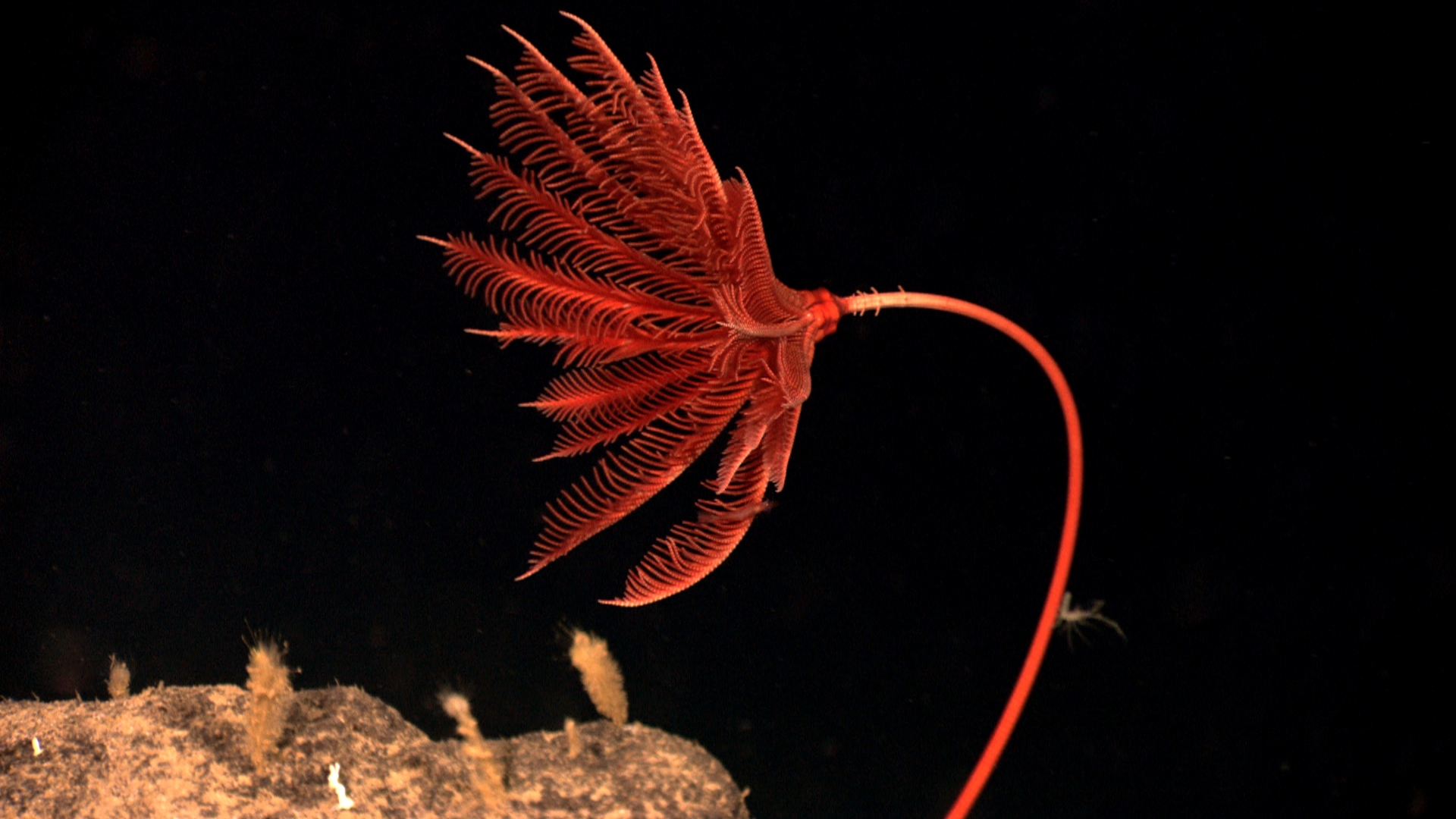
Proisocrinus ruberrimus (Balanocrinidae)

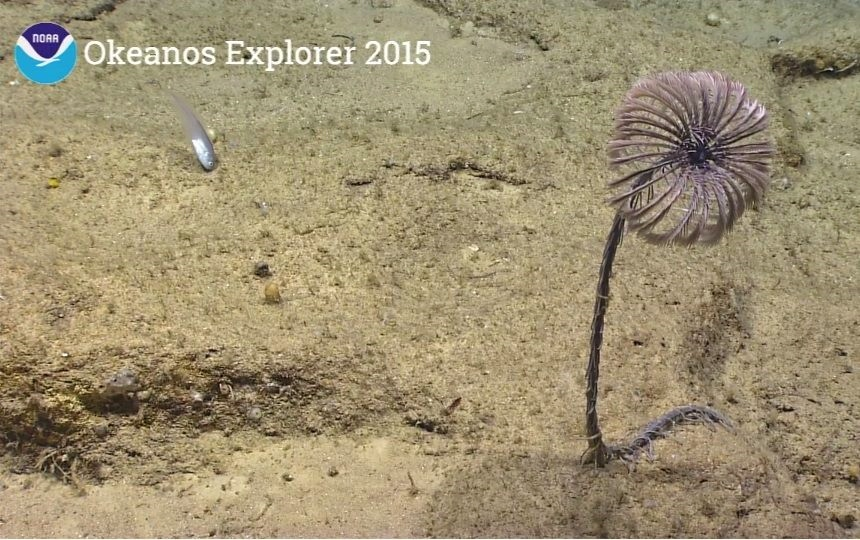
Endoxocrinus sp. (Balanocrinidae)

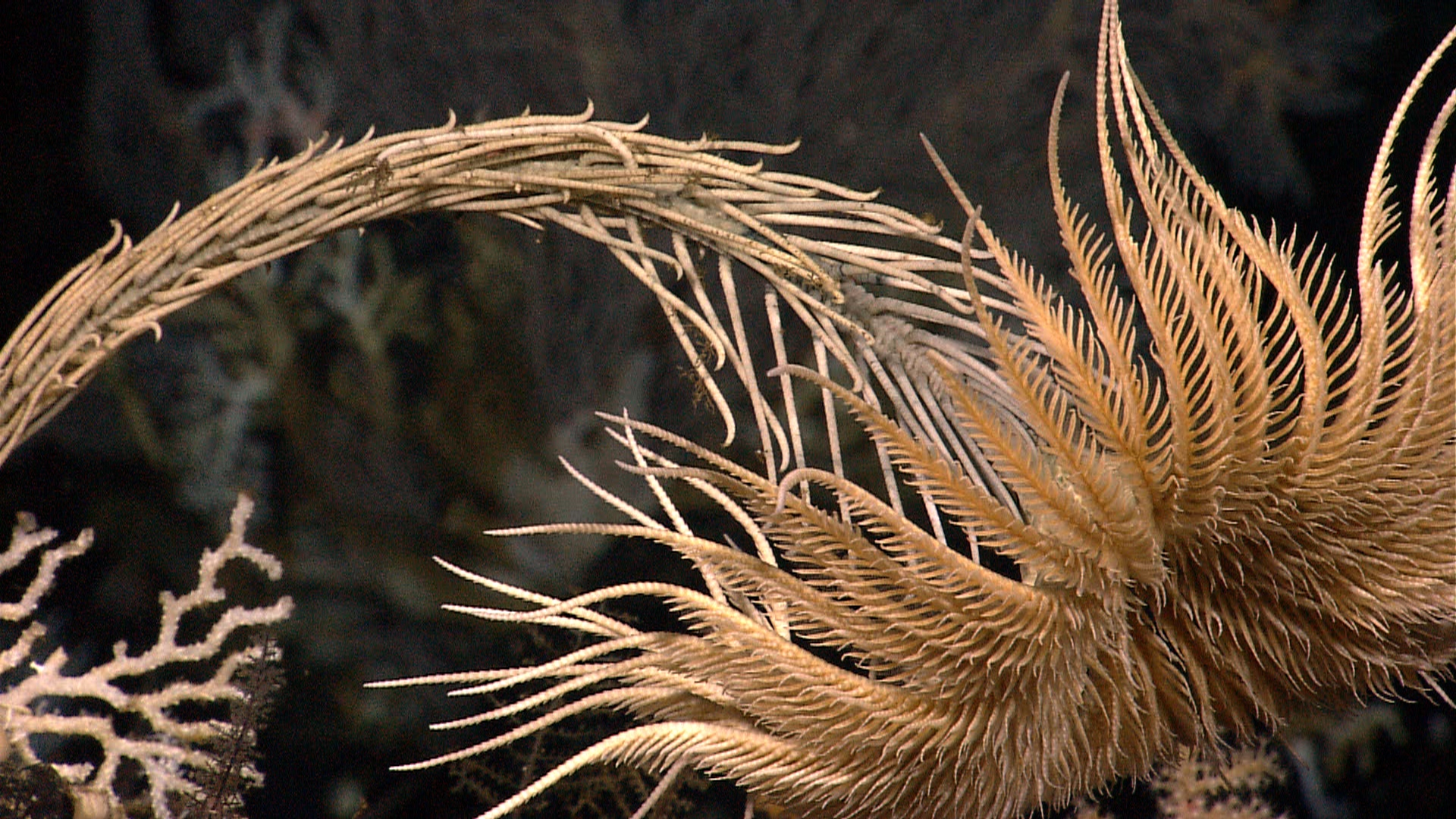
Unidentified Isocrinid
