= Crenata =

Crenata is the feminine form of Latin crenatus ("with blunt teeth"), and can be found in a number of scientific names, among them the following:

== Plants ==
- Marsilea crenata , a fern
- Orobanche crenata , a parasite plant in Orobanchaceae
- Stevia crenata , a plant in Asteraceae
- Calceolaria crenata , a plant in Calceolariaceae
- Melanophylla crenata , a plant in Melanophyllaceae
- Ardisia crenata , a plant in Myrsinaceae
- Eugenia crenata , a plant in Myrtaceae
- Cyrtandra crenata , a plant in Gesneriaceae
- Rinorea crenata , a plant in Violaceae
- Rhus crenata , a bush in Anacardiaceae
- Ilex crenata , a bush in Aquifoliaceae
- Hyptis crenata , a bush in Lamiaceae
- Fagus crenata , a tree in Fagaceae
- Castanea crenata , a tree in Fagaceae
- Scolopia crenata , a tree in Salicaceae
- Picrasma crenata , a tree in Simaroubaceae

== Animals ==
=== Gasteropods ===
- Liotina crenata , a sea snail
- Turbonilla crenata , a sea snail
- Mitra crenata , a sea snail
- Harpa crenata , a sea snail
- Amphibola crenata , an amphibian snail
- Conturbatia crenata , a land snail

=== Insects ===
- Gluphisia crenata , a moth
- Apamea crenata , a moth
- Likoma crenata , a moth
- Urodeta crenata , a moth
- Eupithecia crenata , a moth
- Aeshna crenata , a dragonfly
