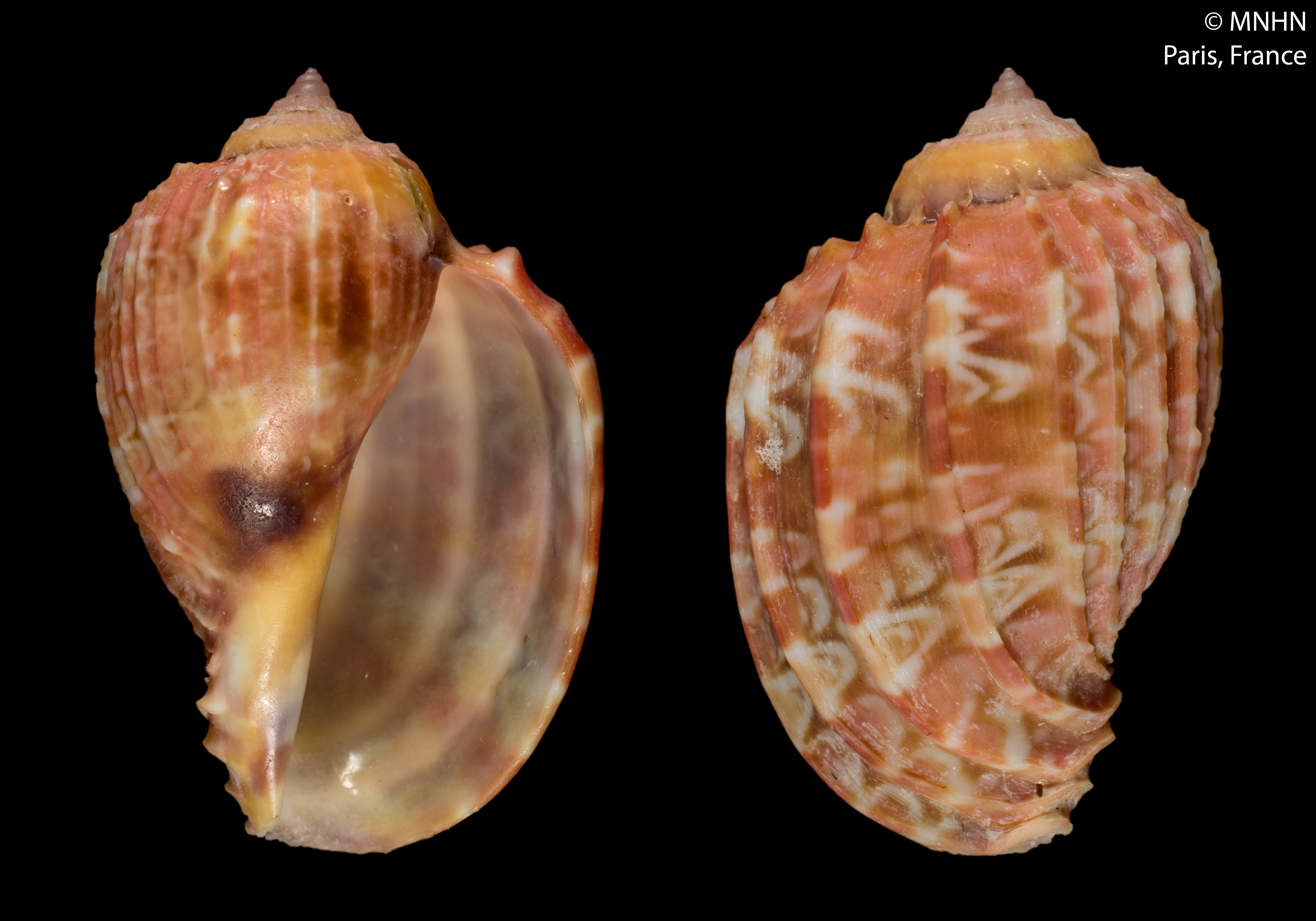

Scientific classification
- Kingdom: Animalia
- Phylum: Mollusca
- Class: Gastropoda
- Subclass: Caenogastropoda
- Order: Neogastropoda
- Superfamily: Muricoidea
- Family: Harpidae
- Subfamily: Harpinae
- Genus: Harpa
- Species: H. lorenzi

Binomial name
- Harpa lorenzi D. Monsecour & K. Monsecour, 2018

= Harpa lorenzi =

Species of gastropod

Harpa lorenzi is a species of sea snail, a marine gastropod mollusk, in the family Harpidae.

== Description ==
The length of the shell attains 44 mm.

== Distribution ==
This species occurs in Natal.
