= Likoma =

Likoma may refer to:

- Likoma (moth), a genus of moths in the family Sphingidae
- Likoma Island, an island surrounded by Lake Malawi in East Africa
- Likoma District, an administrative district of Malawi
- Likoma, Malawi, a town on Likoma Island that serves as the administrative capital of Likoma District
