= Harpa queenslandica =

Scientific classification
- Kingdom: Animalia
- Phylum: Mollusca
- Class: Gastropoda
- Subclass: Caenogastropoda
- Order: Neogastropoda
- Superfamily: Muricoidea
- Family: Harpidae
- Subfamily: Harpinae
- Genus: Harpa
- Species: H. queenslandica

Binomial name
- Harpa queenslandica Berschauer & Petuch, 2016

Species of gastropod

Harpa queenslandica is a species of sea snail, a marine gastropod mollusk, in the family Harpidae.

== Distribution ==
This species occurs in Great Barrier Reef.
