= H. robusta =

H. robusta may refer to:

- Harpa robusta, a sea snail species
- Hydrangea robusta, a plant species native to China and the Himalayas

== See also ==
- Robusta
