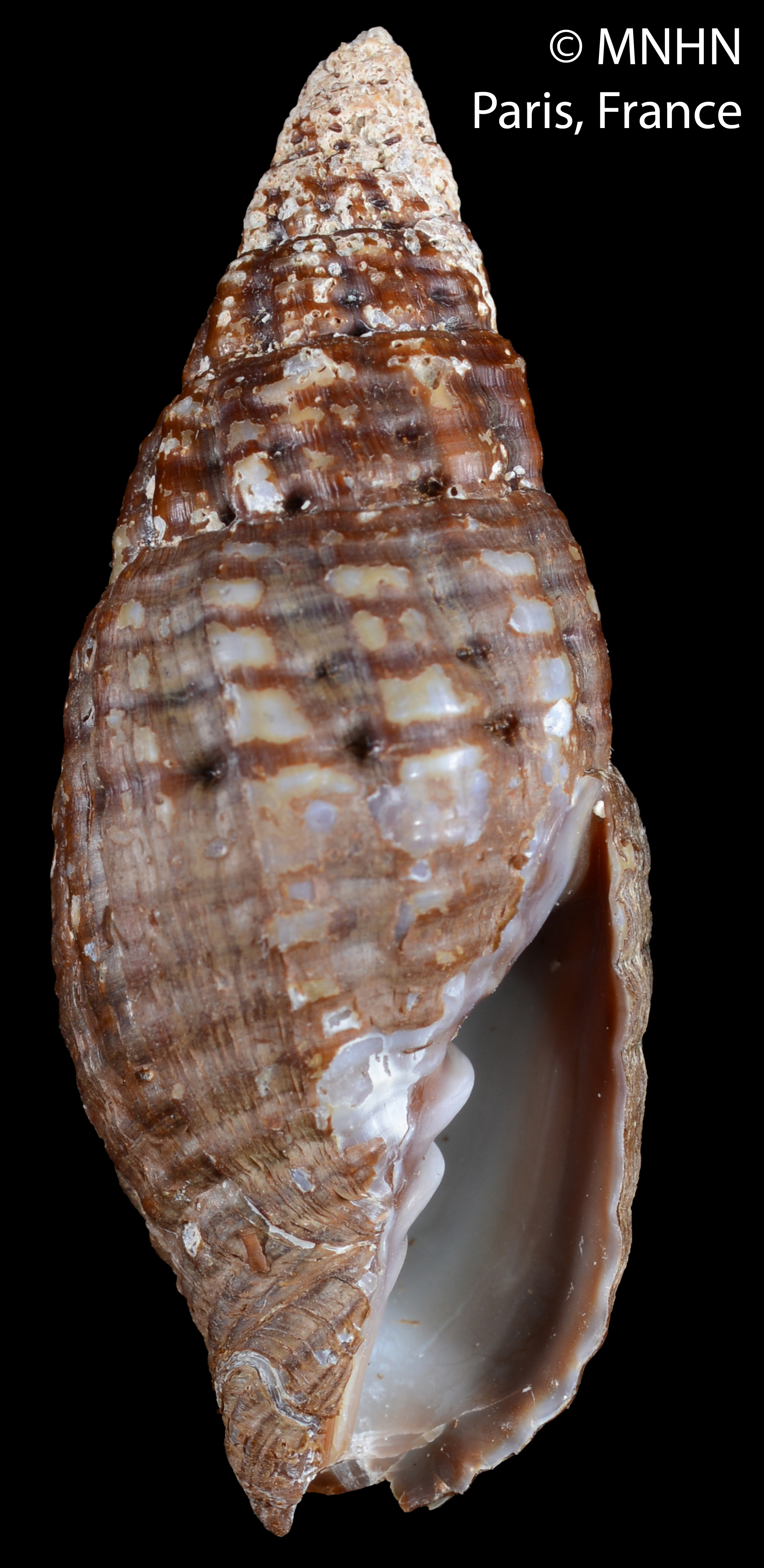
- Shell of Neotiara lens (neotype at MNHN, Paris)

Scientific classification
- Kingdom: Animalia
- Phylum: Mollusca
- Class: Gastropoda
- Subclass: Caenogastropoda
- Order: Neogastropoda
- Superfamily: Mitroidea
- Family: Mitridae
- Subfamily: Mitrinae
- Genus: Neotiara; Fedosov, Herrmann, Kantor & Bouchet, 2018

Type species
- Voluta lens W. Wood, 1828

= Neotiara =

Genus of gastropods

Neotiara is a genus of sea snails, marine gastropod mollusks in the subfamily Mitrinae of the family Mitridae.

== Species ==
Species within the genus Neotiara include:

- Neotiara crenata (Broderip, 1836)
- Neotiara fultoni (E. A. Smith, 1892)
- Neotiara gausapata (Reeve, 1845)
- Neotiara lens (W. Wood, 1828)
- Neotiara muricata (Broderip, 1836)
- Neotiara nodulosa (Gmelin, 1791)
- Neotiara pallida (Nowell-Usticke, 1959)
- Neotiara rupicola (Reeve, 1844)
- Neotiara sphoni (Shasky & G. B. Campbell, 1964)
