= Neotiara pallida =

Scientific classification
- Kingdom: Animalia
- Phylum: Mollusca
- Class: Gastropoda
- Subclass: Caenogastropoda
- Order: Neogastropoda
- Family: Mitridae
- Genus: Neotiara
- Species: N. pallida

Binomial name
- Neotiara pallida Nowell-Usticke, 1959

Synonyms
- Mitra pallida Nowell-Usticke, 1959

Species of gastropod

Neotiara pallida is a species of sea snail, a marine gastropod mollusk in the family Mitridae, the miters or miter snails.

== Distribution ==
Neotiara pallida can be found in the Caribbean Sea, Gulf of Mexico and Lesser Antilles.
