= Harpa harpa =

Scientific classification
- Kingdom: Animalia
- Phylum: Mollusca
- Class: Gastropoda
- Subclass: Caenogastropoda
- Order: Neogastropoda
- Family: Harpidae
- Genus: Harpa
- Species: H. harpa

Binomial name
- Harpa harpa (Linnaeus, 1758)

Synonyms
- Buccinum harpa Linnaeus, 1758; Harpa nobilis Röding, P.F., 1798; Harpa nobilis Lamarck, 1822

Species of gastropod

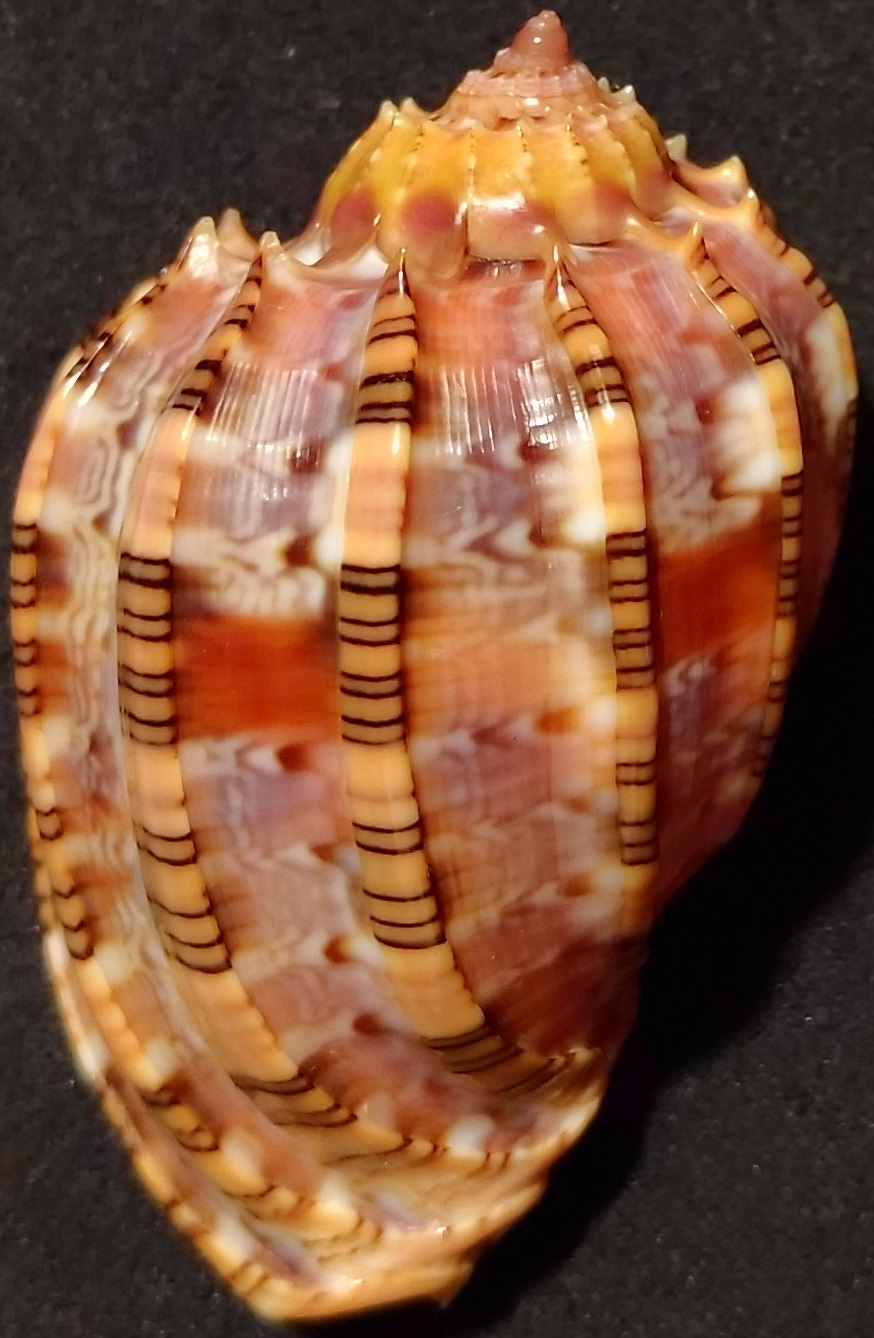

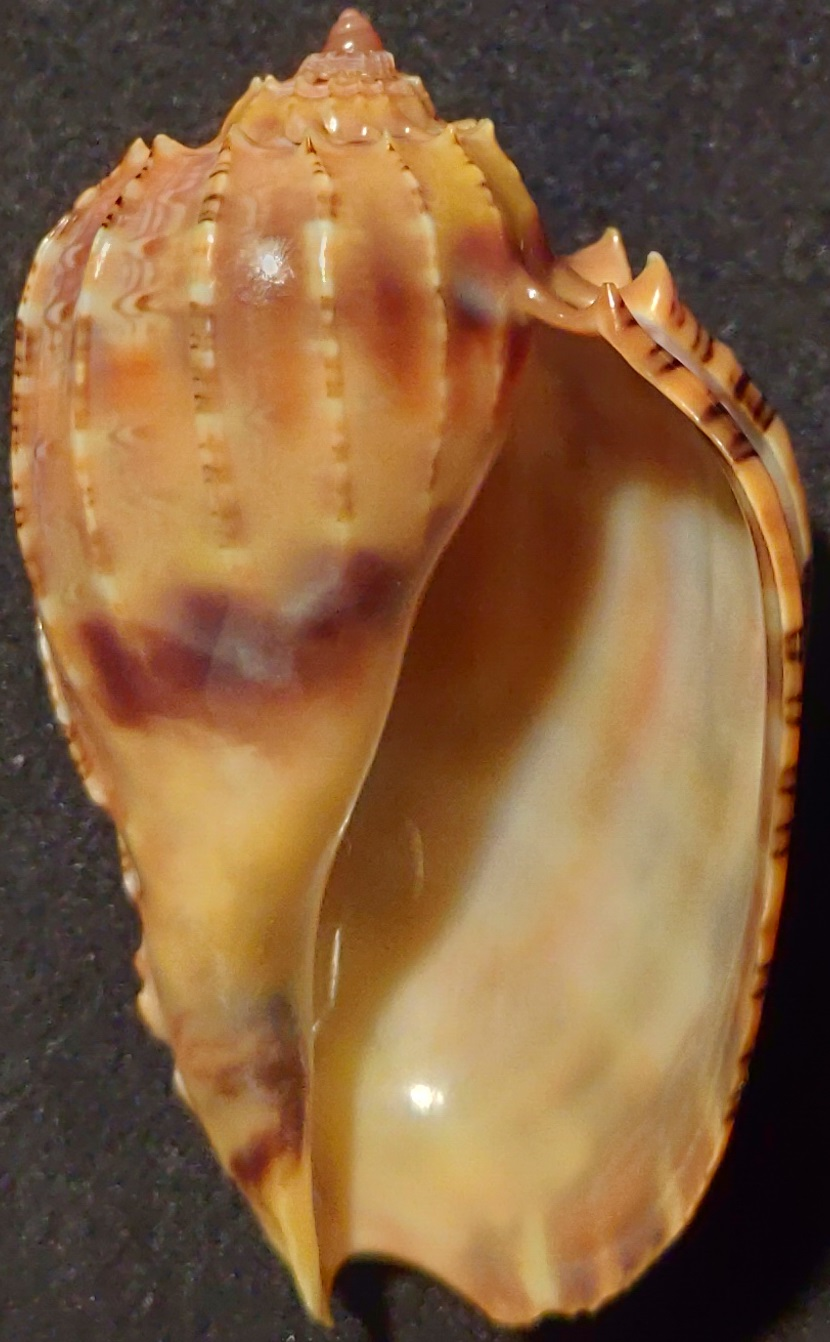

Harpa harpa, common name the true harp or the noble harp, is a species of sea snail, a marine gastropod mollusk in the family Harpidae, the harp snails.

== Description ==
The size of the shell varies between 40 mm and 110 mm.

The ovate shell is a little ventricose. The spire is slightly elongated and submuricated. The 12 to 14 whorls are flattened above, surmounted by ribs which are continued. The whorls become broader as they approach the lip. They are ornamented with transverse black lines, dividing them into unequal spaces, the coloring of which is less deep than that of the interstices of the ribs. The ribs are of a grayish or brown tint, of little variety, with wide spots, which sometimes form bands of a bloody purple. There are undulating lines in zigzags or white festoons, and brown meanderings between them. There are ovate, short sharp spines on shoulder. The upper band of the body whorl often becomes more apparent from the brightened or even whitish shade of its color. The ovate aperture is of an orange white. The outer lip is marked by brown spots internally, and bordered externally by the last rib which is denticulated in a portion of its length. The columella is slightly arched at the base, almost covered in its length by three very distant violet or brown spots.

== Distribution ==
This species occurs in the Red Sea and in the Indian Ocean off Chagos, the Comores, Djibouti, Eritrea, Kenya, Madagascar, Mauritius, Mozambique, Réunion, the Seychelles, Somalia and Tanzania; in the Western Pacific to Hawaii; also off Okinawa and Australia (Northern Territory, Queensland, Western Australia).
