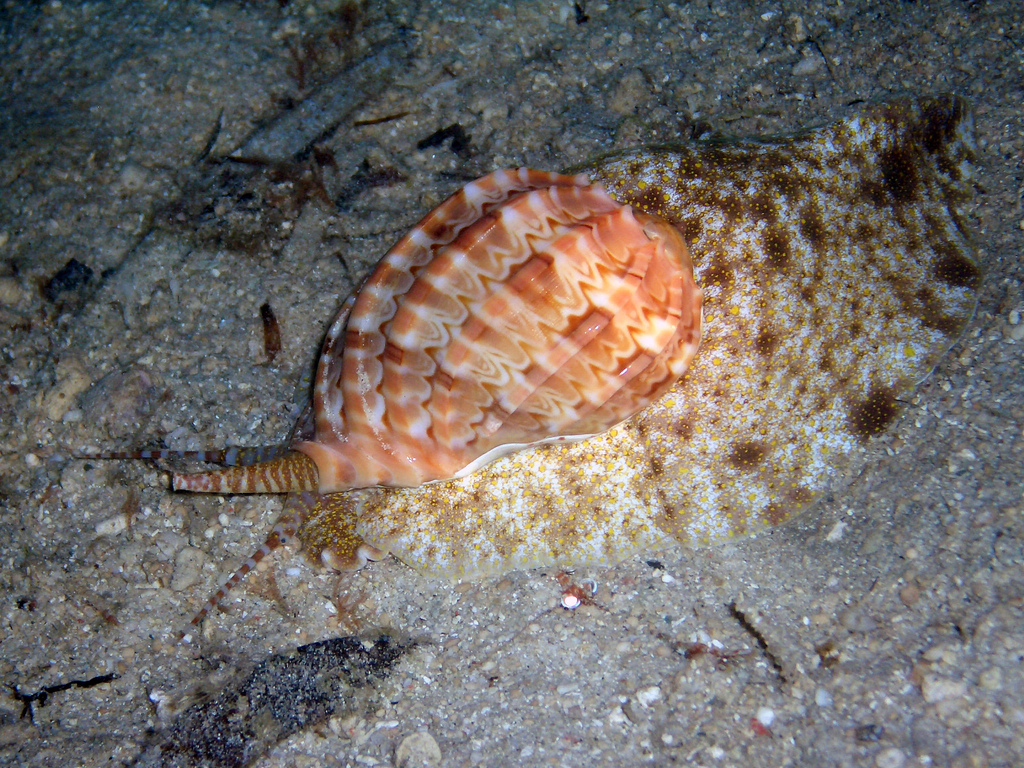
- A live individual of Harpa major

Scientific classification
- Kingdom: Animalia
- Phylum: Mollusca
- Class: Gastropoda
- Subclass: Caenogastropoda
- Order: Neogastropoda
- Family: Harpidae
- Genus: Harpa
- Species: H. major

Binomial name
- Harpa major Röding, 1798

Synonyms
- Harpa conoidalis Lamarck, 1822; Harpa kawamurai Habe, 1973; Harpa ligata Menke, 1828; Harpa major major Röding, 1798 · accepted, alternate representation; Harpa ventricosa Lamarck, 1801

= Harpa major =

Species of gastropod

Harpa major, commonly known by the English vernacular names large harp, or alternatively as the major harp, is a notable species of large predatory sea snail. These fascinating marine gastropod mollusks belong to the family Harpidae, a group collectively known as the harp snails and their close allies.

== Description ==
The shells of Harpa major vary considerably in size among individuals, typically measuring between approximately 60 mm and 130 mm in length at maturity. Average adult specimens of this species reach about 3 1/2 inches (approximately 8.9 cm) in length, and their shells are characterized by an ovate overall body shape and possess a notably heavily calloused spire. The columella, which forms the central, lower portion of the shell's inner whorl, typically displays a characteristic dark brown coloring that distinguishes it.

From an anatomical perspective, the snail possesses a notably long siphon, a relatively large mouth aperture, and a very large foot in proportion to its shell size. These anatomical features are extensively utilized when the snail employs its methods for hunting prey. This species functions as a voracious nocturnal predator, primarily feeding on various benthic crustaceans found inhabiting sandy seafloor substrates, and is notably capable of preying on crabs that are nearly as large as the snail itself.

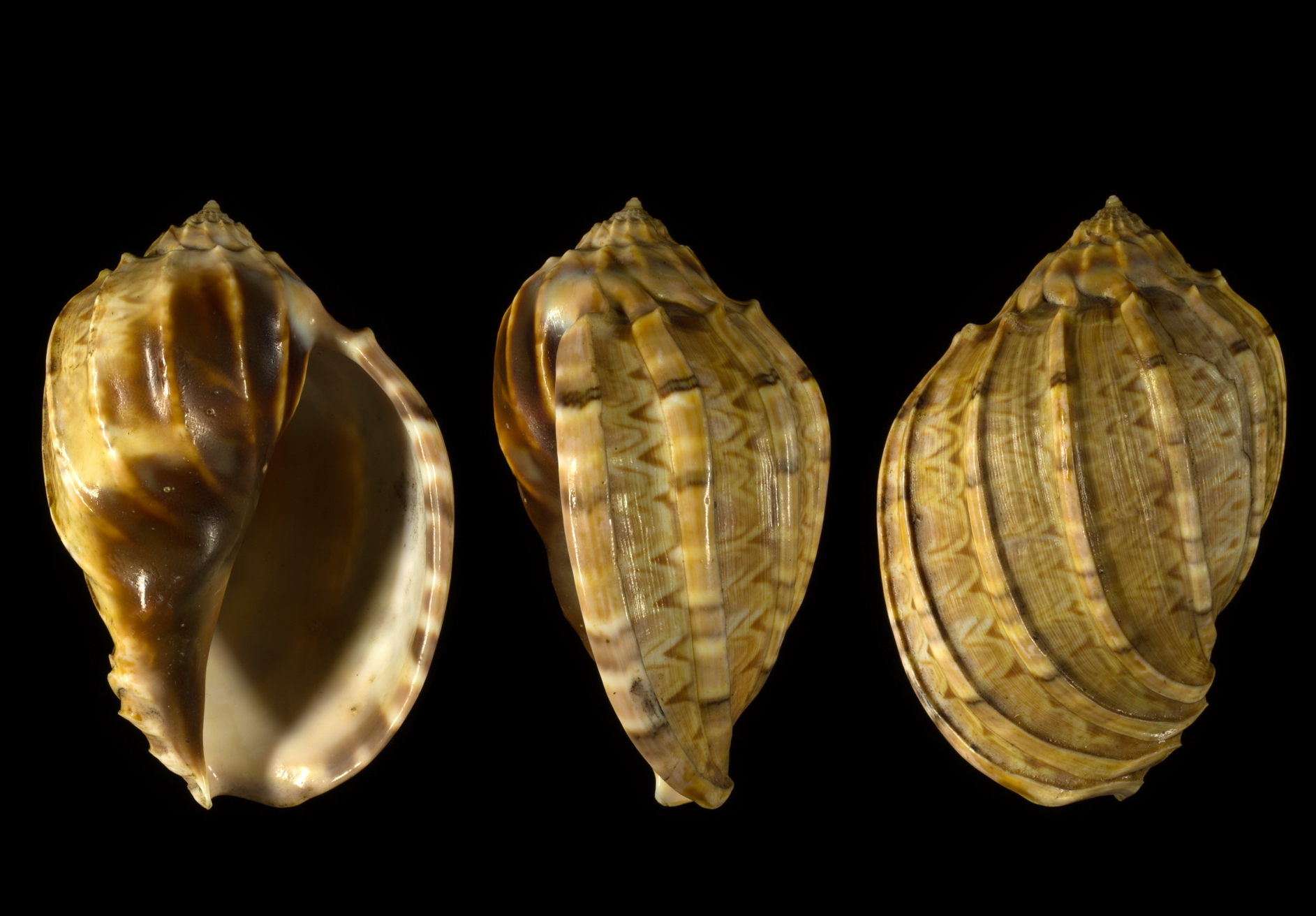
Shell of Harpa major (specimen at MNHN, Paris)

== Distribution ==
This marine species is distributed across several distinct geographical locations within the Indo-Pacific region. These documented occurrences include areas off the coasts of East Africa, specifically encompassing regions near Tanzania and Mozambique; its presence is also noted within the Mascarene Basin in the western Indian Ocean; and it is further found off the islands of Hawaii in the central Pacific.
