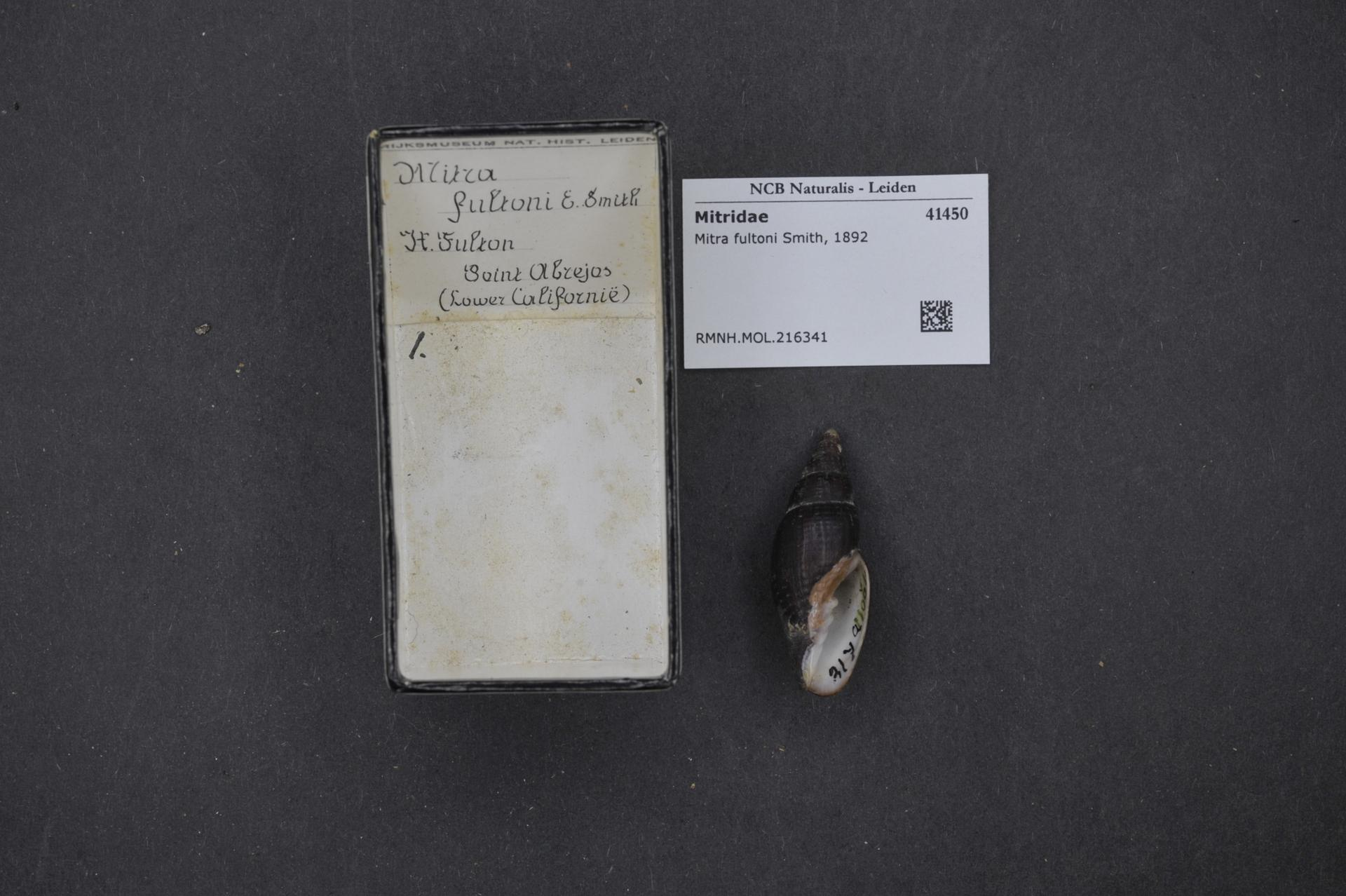
- Mollusc shell

Scientific classification
- Kingdom: Animalia
- Phylum: Mollusca
- Class: Gastropoda
- Subclass: Caenogastropoda
- Order: Neogastropoda
- Family: Mitridae
- Genus: Neotiara
- Species: N. fultoni

Binomial name
- Neotiara fultoni (E. A. Smith, 1892)

Synonyms
- Mitra fultoni E. A. Smith, 1892

= Neotiara fultoni =

Species of gastropod

Neotiara fultoni is a species of sea snail, a marine gastropod mollusk in the family Mitridae, the miters or miter snails.
