= Neotiara muricata =

Scientific classification
- Kingdom: Animalia
- Phylum: Mollusca
- Class: Gastropoda
- Subclass: Caenogastropoda
- Order: Neogastropoda
- Family: Mitridae
- Genus: Neotiara
- Species: N. muricata

Binomial name
- Neotiara muricata (Broderip, 1836)

Synonyms
- Mitra muricata (Broderip, 1836)

Species of gastropod

Neotiara muricata is a species of sea snail, a marine gastropod mollusk in the family Mitridae, the miters or miter snails.
