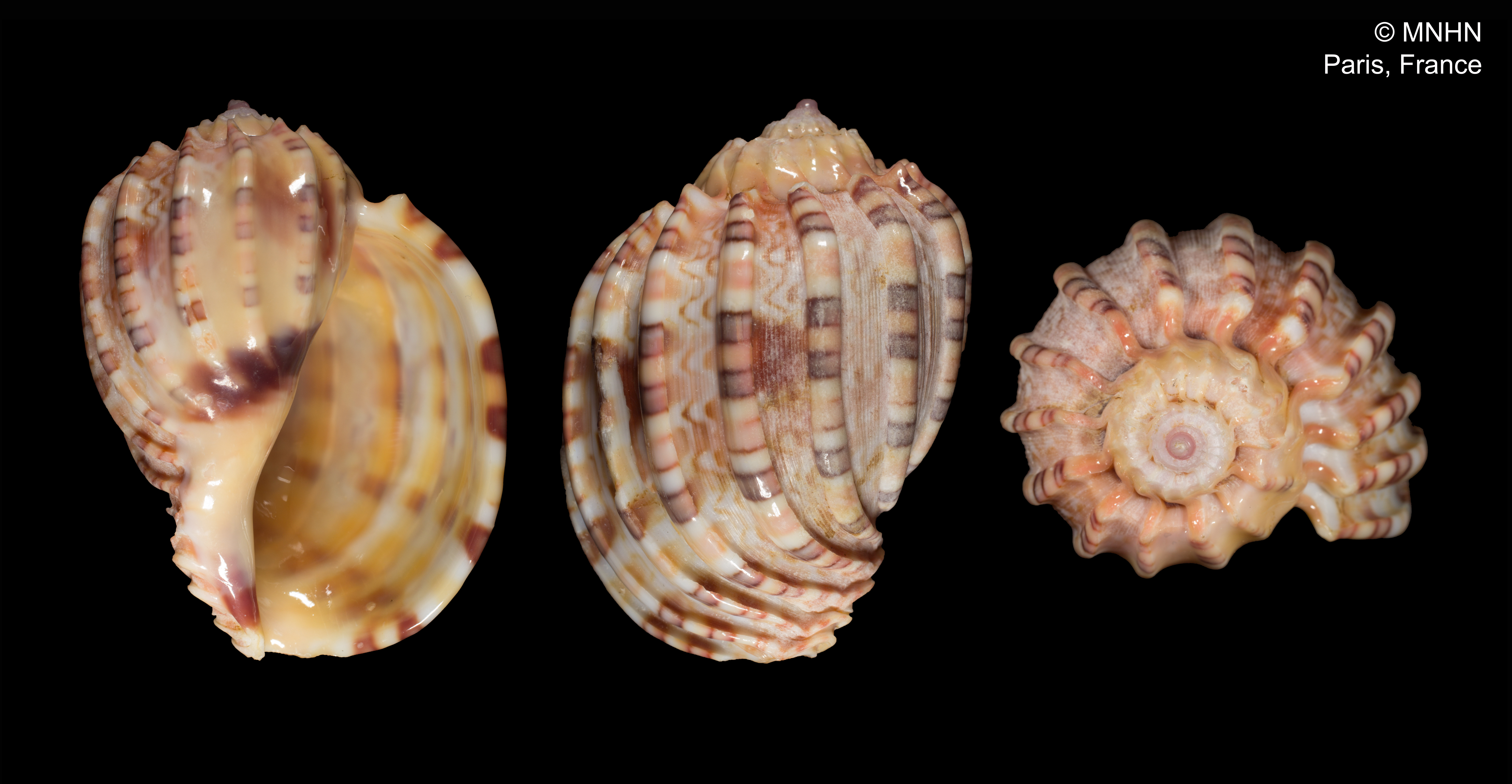

Scientific classification
- Kingdom: Animalia
- Phylum: Mollusca
- Class: Gastropoda
- Subclass: Caenogastropoda
- Order: Neogastropoda
- Family: Harpidae
- Genus: Harpa
- Species: H. goodwini

Binomial name
- Harpa goodwini Rehder, 1993

= Harpa goodwini =

Species of mollusc

Harpa goodwini is a species of sea snail, a marine gastropod mollusk in the family Harpidae, the harp snails.

== Distribution ==
This marine species occurs off Hawaii.
