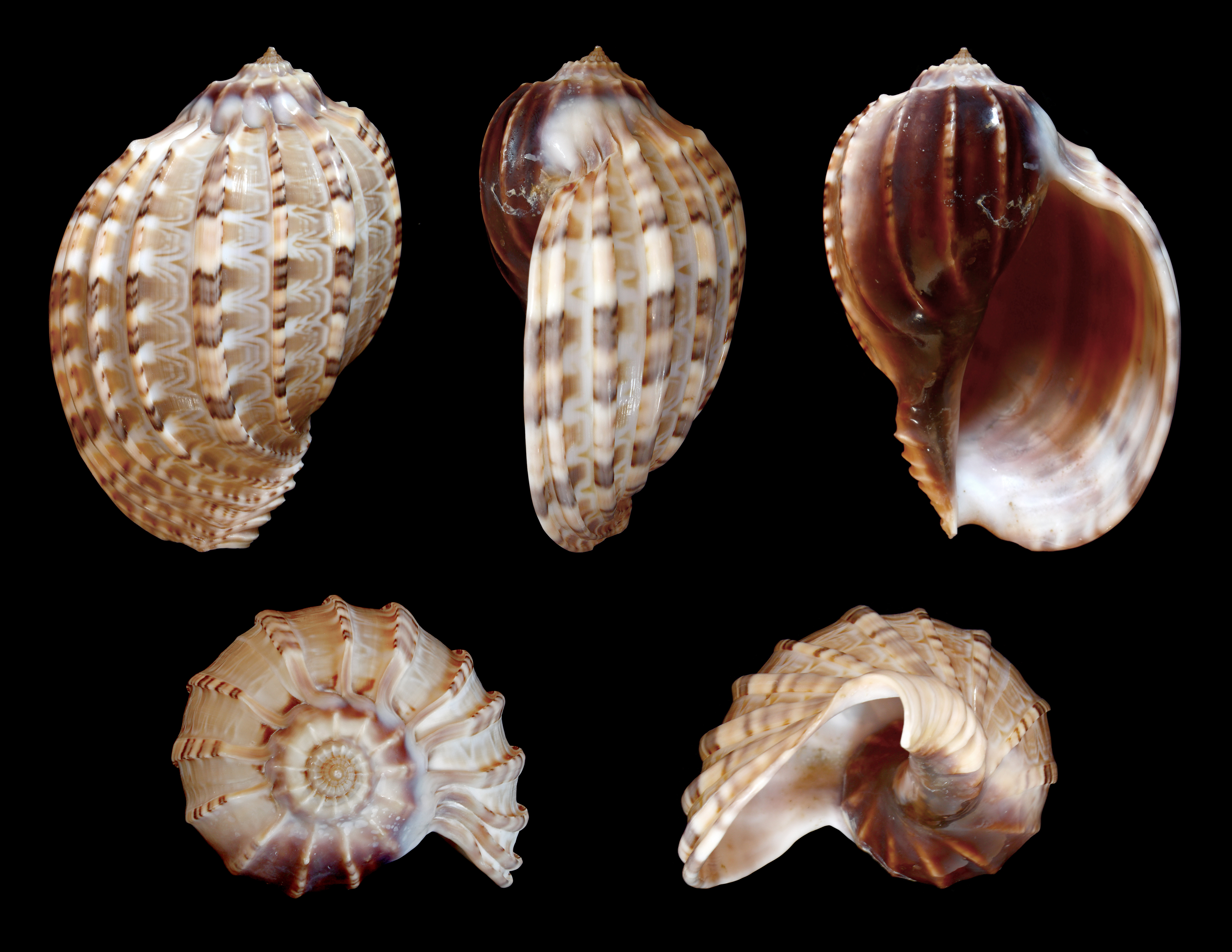

Scientific classification
- Kingdom: Animalia
- Phylum: Mollusca
- Class: Gastropoda
- Subclass: Caenogastropoda
- Order: Neogastropoda
- Family: Harpidae
- Genus: Harpa
- Species: H. articularis

Binomial name
- Harpa articularis Lamarck, 1822

Synonyms
- Harpa davidus Habe, T. 1964 (junior homonym of Harpa davidus Röding 1798)

= Harpa articularis =

Species of gastropod

Harpa articularis, common name the articulate harp shell, is a species of sea snail, a marine gastropod mollusk in the family Harpidae, the harp snails.

== Description ==
The size of the shell varies between 50 mm and 110 mm.

The rather thin shell is ovate and ventricose. The spire is conical, indistinctly muricated. The ribs are pretty narrow, distant and slightly flattened. They are marked by transverse brown lines, articulated and winding like light festoons. Between these lines appear white and violet spots. The interstices between the ribs are grayish. The longitudinal waved lines which are there seen, are strongly arched, and very contiguous to each other. They form species of transverse bands, at the origin of which exists a triangular brown chestnut-colored spot. The sharpest angle of this spot is continued sometimes into the interstices, in the middle of the narrow and white bands formed by the bars to the number of twelve upon the body whorl. The brown bars are less conspicuous. The large aperture is ovate, of a violet color upon the edge, and reddish within. Through these colors are perceived the transverse brown bands. The columella is polished, covered over its whole length by a large brown chestnut-colored spot.

== Distribution ==
This species occurs in the Indian Ocean off the Mascarene Basin to the West Pacific, as far as Fiji; also off Australia (Northern Territory, Queensland, Western Australia)
