= Neotiara rupicola =

Scientific classification
- Kingdom: Animalia
- Phylum: Mollusca
- Class: Gastropoda
- Subclass: Caenogastropoda
- Order: Neogastropoda
- Superfamily: Mitroidea
- Family: Mitridae
- Subfamily: Mitrinae
- Genus: Neotiara
- Species: N. rupicola

Binomial name
- Neotiara rupicola (Reeve, 1844)

Synonyms
- Mitra lignaria Reeve, 1844; Mitra rupicola Reeve, 1844

Species of gastropod

Neotiara rupicola is a species of sea snail, a marine gastropod mollusk, in the family Mitridae, the miters or miter snails.
