= Neotiara sphoni =

Scientific classification
- Kingdom: Animalia
- Phylum: Mollusca
- Class: Gastropoda
- Subclass: Caenogastropoda
- Order: Neogastropoda
- Family: Mitridae
- Genus: Neotiara
- Species: N. sphoni

Binomial name
- Neotiara sphoni (Shasky & Campbell, 1964)

Synonyms
- Mitra sphoni Shasky & Campbell, 1964

Species of gastropod

Neotiara sphoni is a species of sea snail, a marine gastropod mollusk in the family Mitridae, the miters or miter snails.==References==
