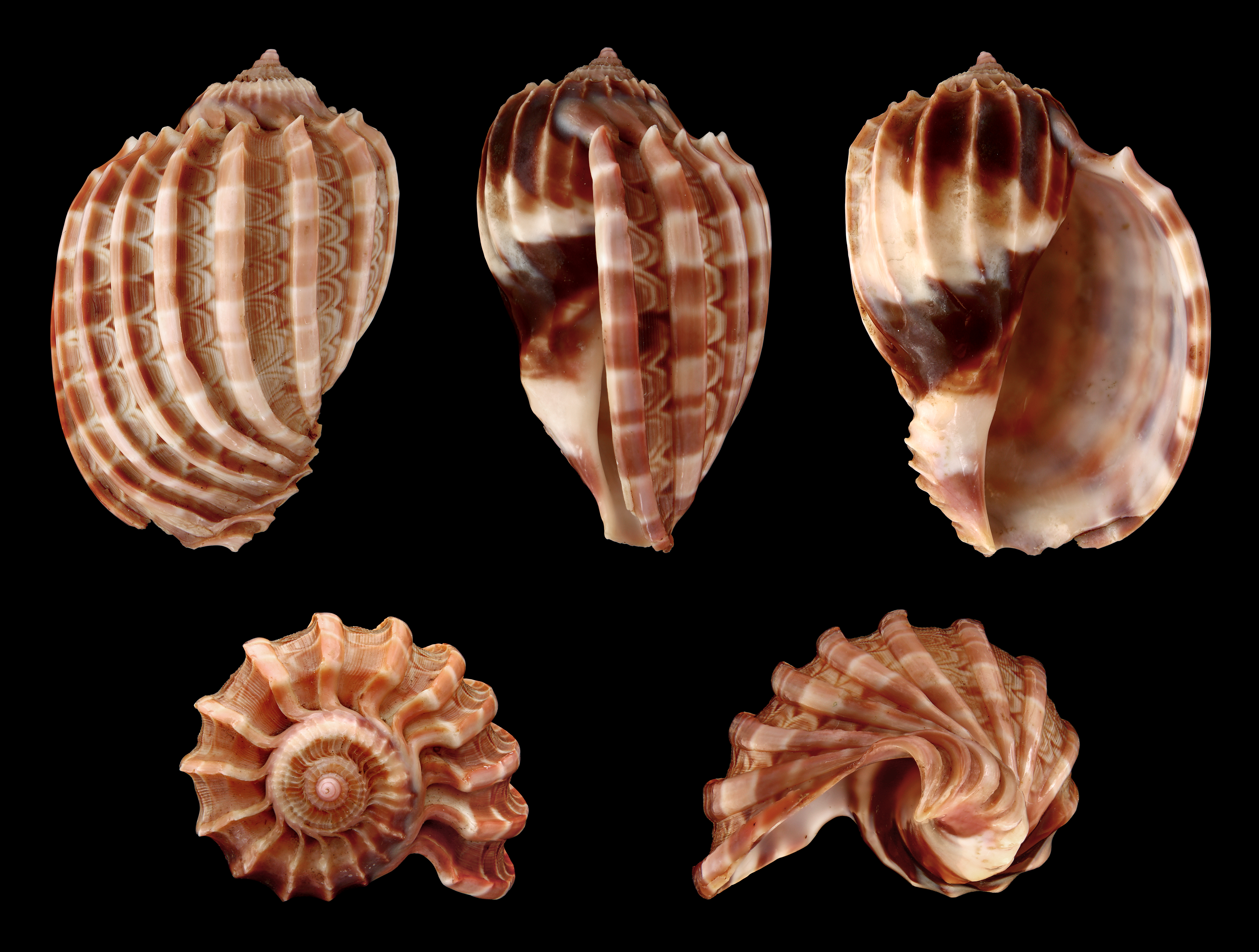
- Five views of a shell of Harpa davidis

Scientific classification
- Kingdom: Animalia
- Phylum: Mollusca
- Class: Gastropoda
- Subclass: Caenogastropoda
- Order: Neogastropoda
- Family: Harpidae
- Genus: Harpa
- Species: H. davidis

Binomial name
- Harpa davidis Röding, 1798

Synonyms
- Harpa conoidalis Lamarck, 1822; Harpa major Röding, 1798; Harpa nablium Mörch, 1852; Harpa ventricosa Lamarck, 1816

= Harpa davidis =

Species of gastropod

Harpa davidis, common name the Madras harp or David harp, is a species of sea snail, a marine gastropod mollusk in the family Harpidae, the harp snails.

== Distribution ==
This species is widespread over Indo-Pacific, from eastern Africa to Hawaii and it is present in the South Eastern India and in the Andaman Sea.

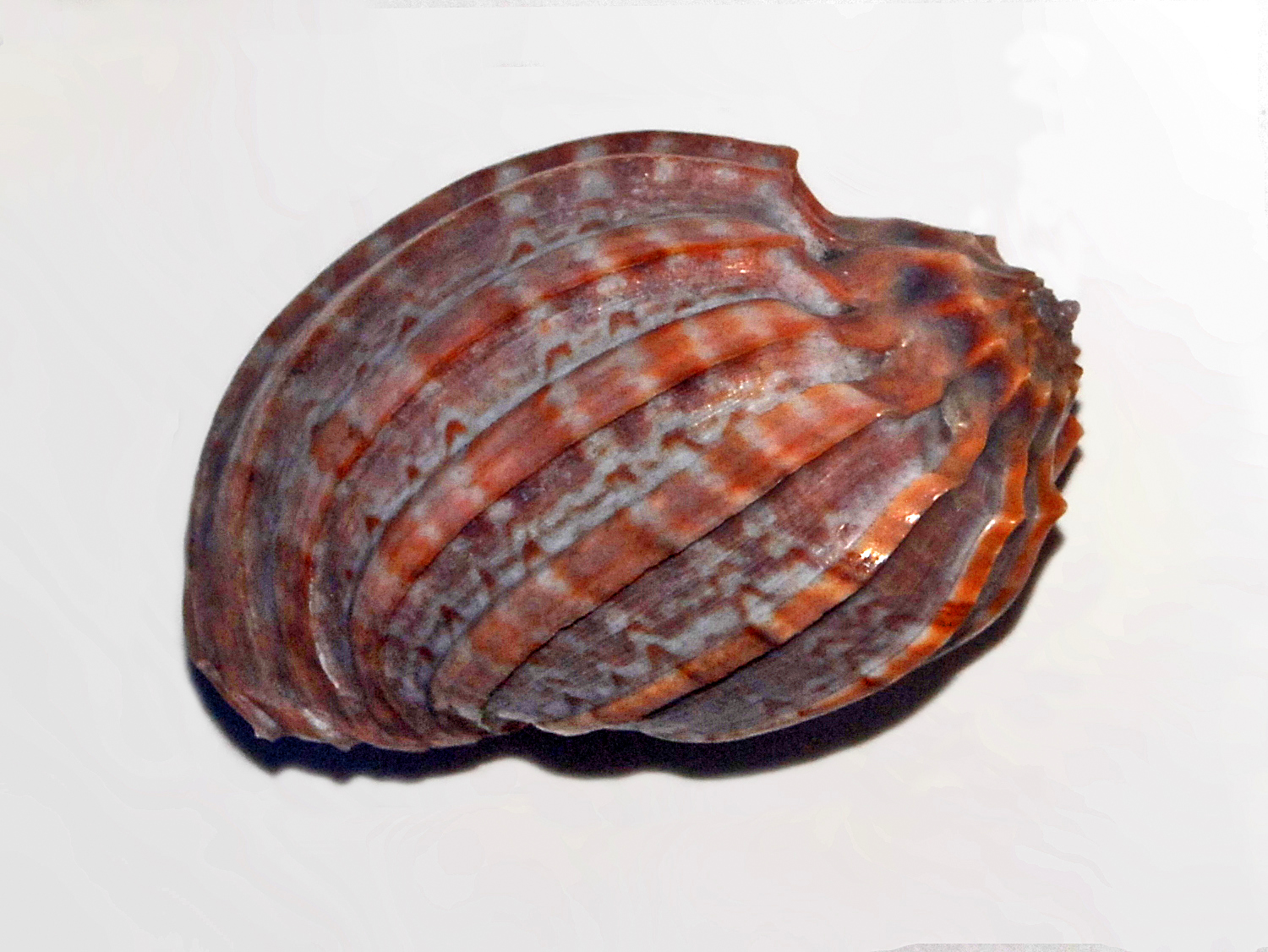
A shell of Harpa davidis

== Habitat ==
The Madras harp lives on sublittoral and offshore sandy bottoms at depths of 5 to 250 m.

== Description ==
Shells of Harpa davidis can reach a size of 60–119 millimetres (2.4–4.7 in). These shells are usually smoothy and glossy, pale brown or reddish-brown, with strong axial ribs, a wide aperture and characteristic decorative markings. The ventral side of body whorl usually shows two-three large brown blotches, but may also be completely brown.

== Bibliography ==
- Hughes, R.N. and W.K. Emerson. 1987. Anatomical and taxonomic characteristics of
- HarpaandMorum(Neogastropoda: Harpaidae). Veliger, 29(4):349–358.
- Rehder, H.A. 1973. The family Harpidae of the world. Indo-Pac. Moll., 3(16):207–274.
- Walls, J.G. 1977. Another viewpoint on the living harps. The Pariah, 4:1–4.
- Walls, J.G. 1980. Conchs, tibias, and harps. T.F.H., Reigate, 191
