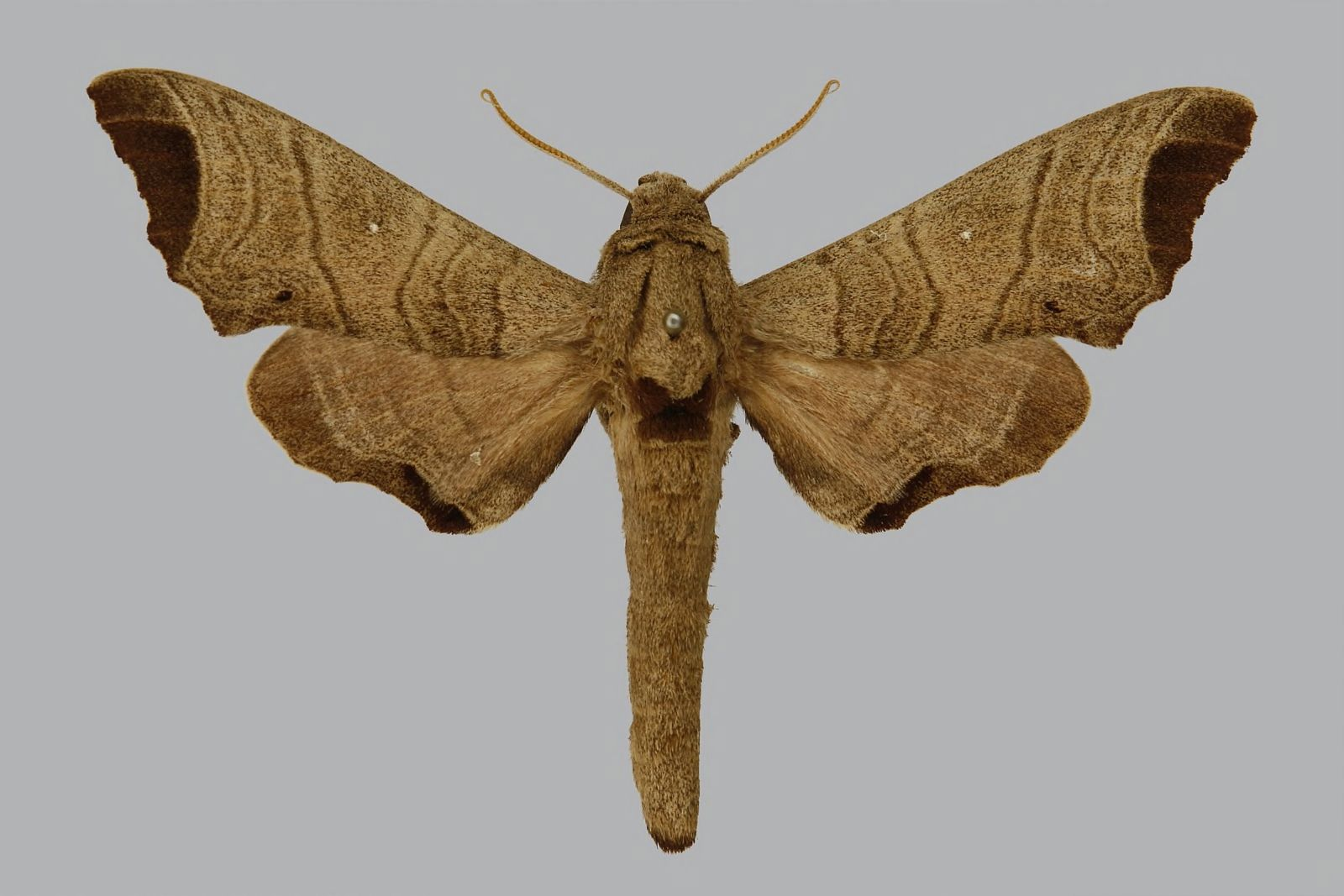
- Male
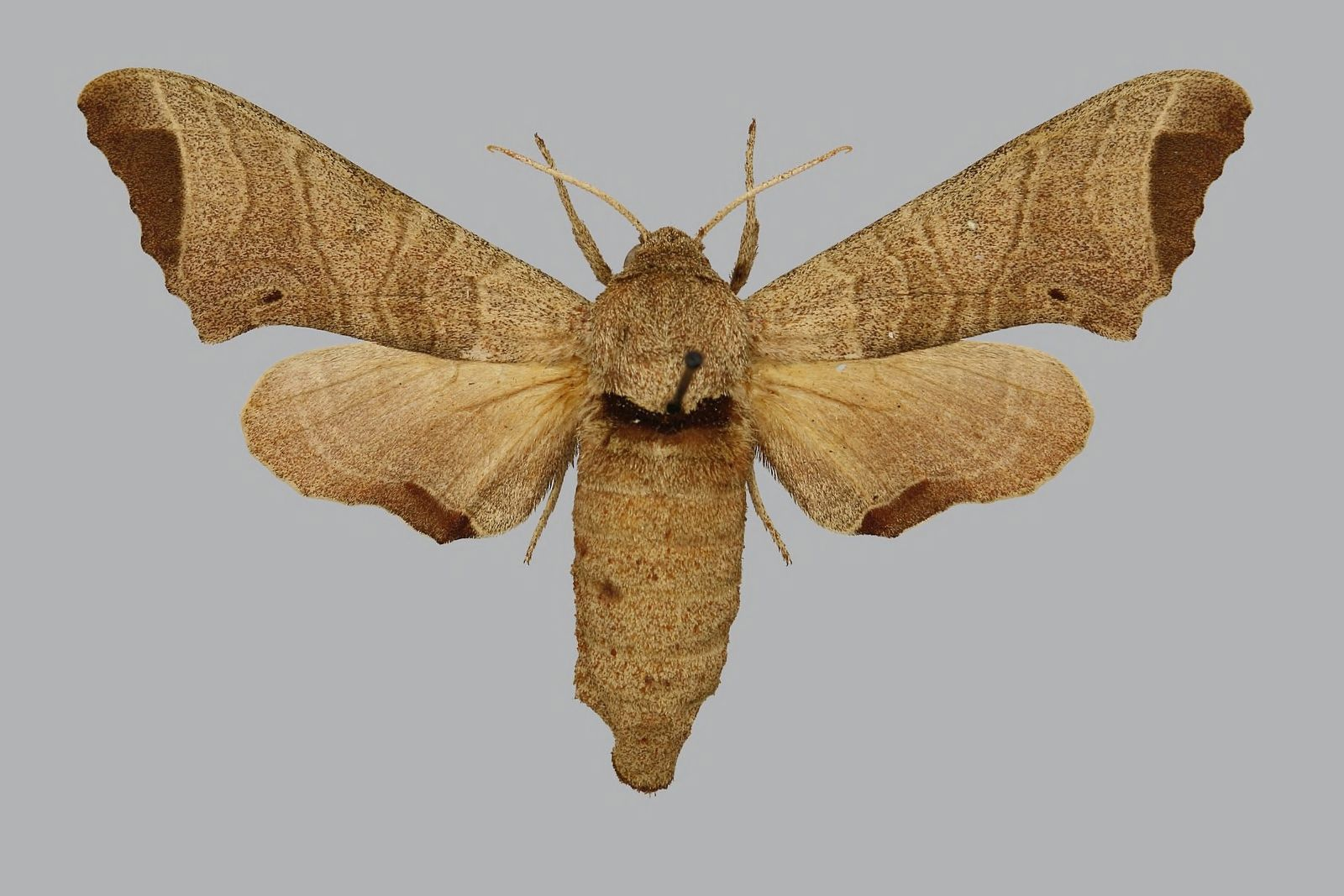
- Female

Scientific classification
- Domain: Eukaryota
- Kingdom: Animalia
- Phylum: Arthropoda
- Class: Insecta
- Order: Lepidoptera
- Family: Sphingidae
- Genus: Likoma
- Species: L. apicalis

Binomial name
- Likoma apicalis Rothschild & Jordan, 1903

= Likoma apicalis =

Species of moth

Likoma apicalis is a moth of the family Sphingidae. It is known from savanna and open woodland in the Democratic Republic of the Congo, Zambia, Malawi, Tanzania and Kenya.

The length of the forewings is 26–30 mm for males and about 34 mm for females.
