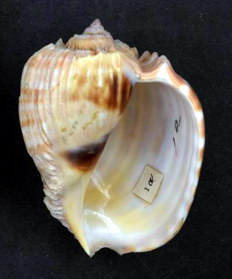
- Apertural view of a shell of Harpa costata (museum specimen at Naturalis Biodiversity Center)

Scientific classification
- Kingdom: Animalia
- Phylum: Mollusca
- Class: Gastropoda
- Subclass: Caenogastropoda
- Order: Neogastropoda
- Family: Harpidae
- Genus: Harpa
- Species: H. costata

Binomial name
- Harpa costata (Linnaeus, 1758)

Synonyms
- Buccinum costatum Linnaeus, 1758; Harpa costata laetifica Melvill, 1916; Harpa laetifica Melvill, 1916; Harpa multicostata G.B. Sowerby I, 1822

= Harpa costata =

Species of gastropod

Harpa costata, common name the ribbed harp or the imperial harp, is a species of sea snail, a marine gastropod mollusk in the family Harpidae, the harp snails.

== Description ==
The size of the shell varies between 60 mm and 110 mm.

== Distribution ==
This species is found in the western Indian Ocean, particularly Mauritius and Rodrigues Island.
