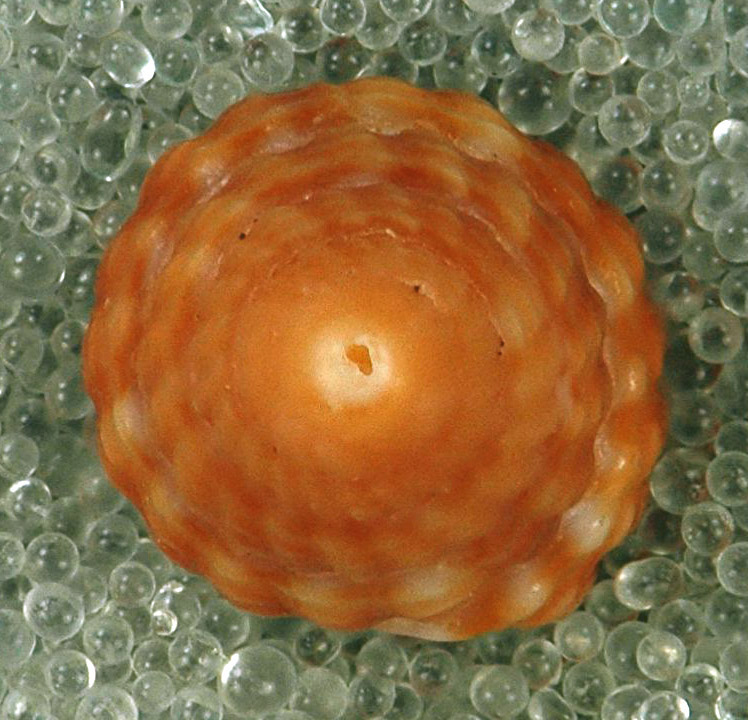
- Mitra nodulosa (beaded miter snail) shell

Scientific classification
- Kingdom: Animalia
- Phylum: Mollusca
- Class: Gastropoda
- Subclass: Caenogastropoda
- Order: Neogastropoda
- Family: Mitridae
- Genus: Neotiara
- Species: N. nodulosa

Binomial name
- Neotiara nodulosa (Gmelin, 1791)

Synonyms
- Voluta pustula Lightfoot, 1786; Mitra nodulosa (Gmelin, 1791); Scabricola nodulosa (Gmelin, 1791); Voluta nodulosa Gmelin, 1791; Nebularia nodulosa (Gmelin, 1791); Mitra granulosa Lamarck, 1811; Voluta lutosa Dillwyn, 1817; Mitra granulata Blainville, 1824; Mitra monilifera auct. non C. B. Adams, 1850; Mitra brasiliensis Oliveira, Almeida, Vieira & Oliveira, 1969

= Neotiara nodulosa =

Species of gastropod

Neotiara nodulosa, more commonly known as nodulose mitre, is a species of sea snail, a marine gastropod mollusk in the family Mitridae, also known as the miter snails.

== Description ==
The shell size varies between 15 mm and 50 mm.

== Distribution ==
This species is distributed in the Caribbean Sea, the Gulf of Mexico and the Lesser Antilles; in the Atlantic Ocean from North Carolina, the Bermudas to Brazil.
