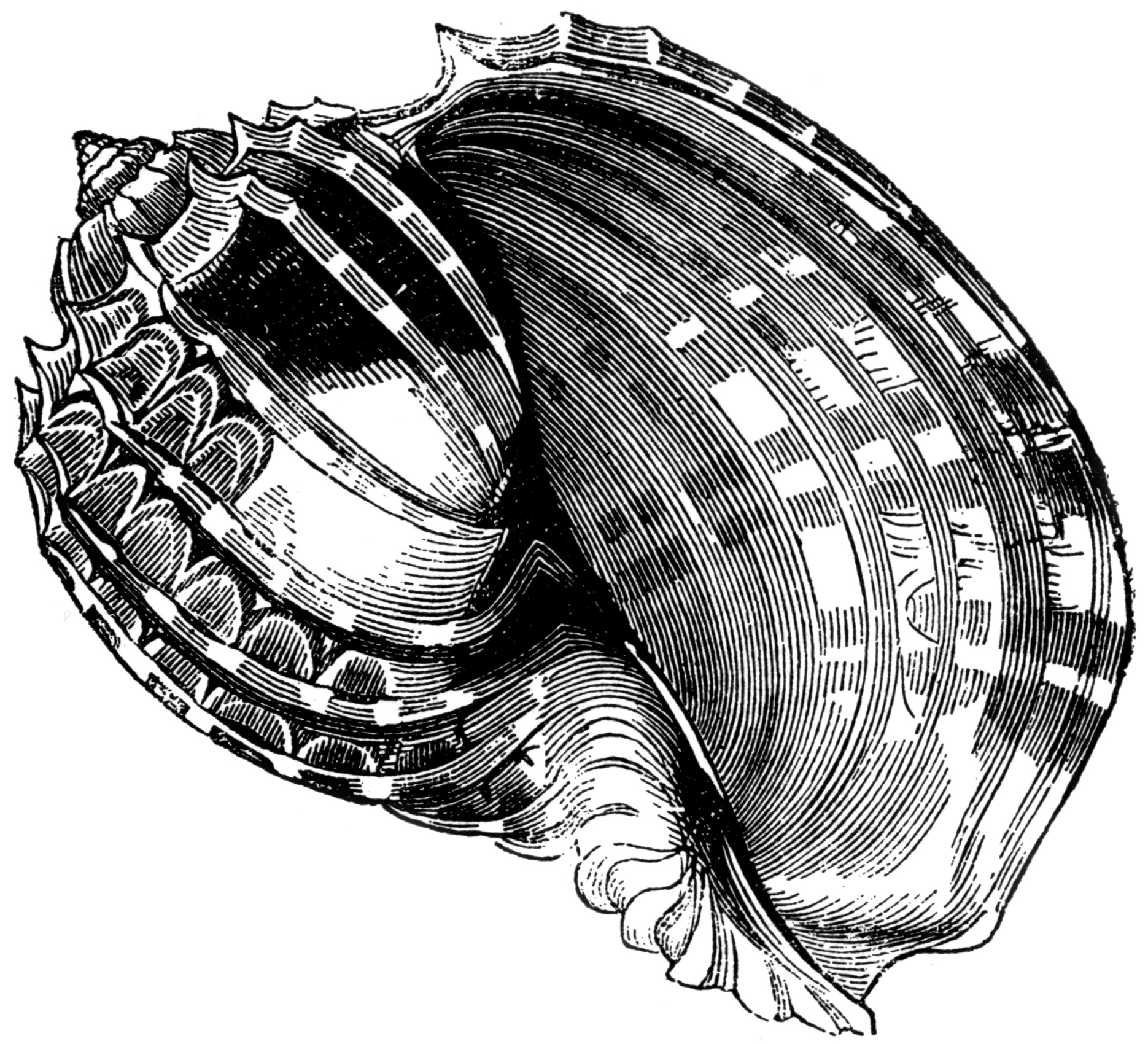

Scientific classification
- Kingdom: Animalia
- Phylum: Mollusca
- Class: Gastropoda
- Subclass: Caenogastropoda
- Order: Neogastropoda
- Family: Harpidae
- Genus: Harpa
- Species: H. cabriti

Binomial name
- Harpa cabriti Fischer, 1860

Synonyms
- Harpa striata Lamarck, 1816; Harpa ventricosa Lamarck, 1816

= Harpa cabriti =

Species of gastropod

Harpa cabriti, previously known as Harpa ventricosa Lamarck, 1816, common name the ventral harp, is a species of large sea snail, a predatory marine gastropod mollusk in the family Harpidae, the harp snails.

The shell is often collected by shell-collecting hobbyists.

== Description ==
The pretty large, oval shell is ventricose, and polished. It is ornamented with more or less distant, wide, compressed, smooth, parallel ribs, inclined towards the base, of a pale rose color, most commonly with quadrangular deep brown spots. These ribs are pointed at their summit, and a little below these form a slight keel, caused by small asperities. The interstice between the ribs is slightly striated longitudinally. The ground color of the shell is whitish or violet, adorned with brown or reddish spots, forming regular festoons throughout its whole length. There are found also upon the surface of the shell two or three bands, sometimes replaced by large spots, which alike surround it. The middle band is always most apparent. The spire is short and is composed of six whorls slightly flattened above. The large aperture is reddish, terminated at its base by an oblique, shallow emargination, marked within with brown spots or bands. The outer lip is bordered externally by the last rib. The columella is smooth, brilliant, and almost covered with very dark brown spots.

== Distribution ==
This marine snail is found from the Red Sea south to South Africa. It lives in the Indian and Pacific Oceans.
