= Harpa kajiyamai =

Scientific classification
- Kingdom: Animalia
- Phylum: Mollusca
- Class: Gastropoda
- Subclass: Caenogastropoda
- Order: Neogastropoda
- Family: Harpidae
- Genus: Harpa
- Species: H. kajiyamai

Binomial name
- Harpa kajiyamai Habe, 1970

Species of gastropod

Harpa kajiyamai is a species of sea snail, a marine gastropod mollusk in the family Harpidae, the harp snails.

== Distribution ==
According to Hardy, this species ranges from Somalia in the western Indian Ocean to Okinawa in the western Pacific Ocean. Specimens of this species have been collected in the Philippines.
