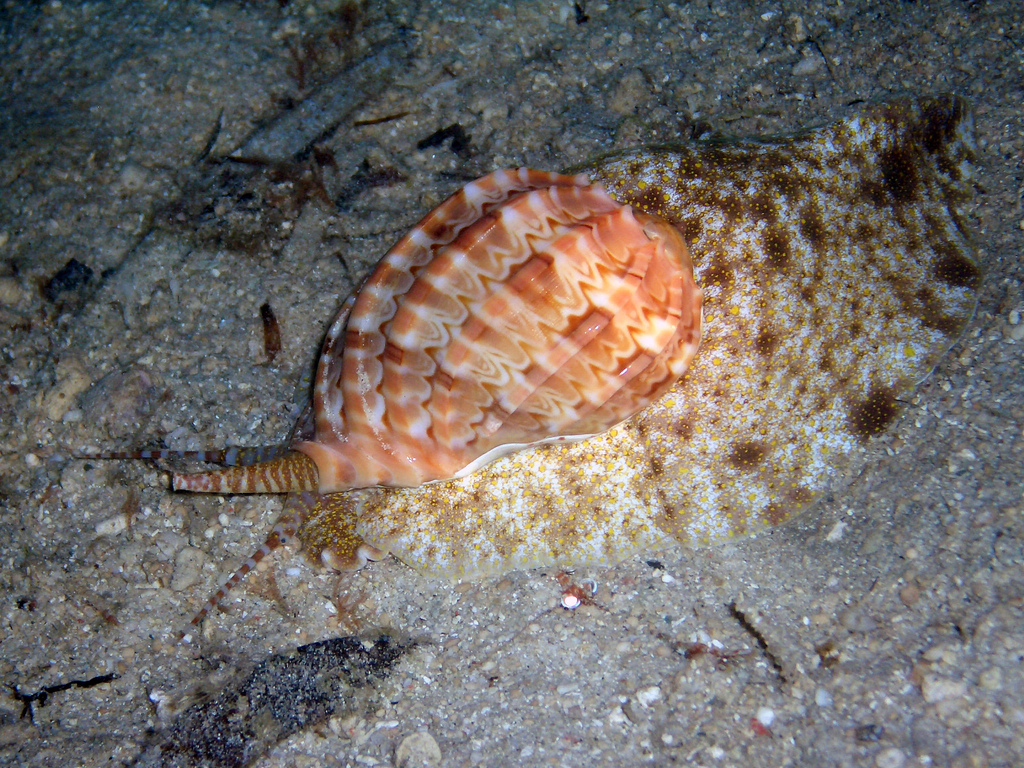
- A live individual of Harpa major

Scientific classification
- Kingdom: Animalia
- Phylum: Mollusca
- Class: Gastropoda
- Subclass: Caenogastropoda
- Order: Neogastropoda
- Family: Harpidae
- Subfamily: Harpinae
- Genus: Harpa; Röding, 1798

Type species
- Buccinum harpa Linnaeus, 1758

Synonyms
- Harpalis Link, 1807

= Harpa =

Genus of gastropods

Harpa, common name the "harp snails", is a genus of large predatory sea snails, marine gastropod mollusks in the family Harpidae.

Harpa is the type genus of the family Harpidae.

== Description ==
The shell has an ovate-oblong shape. It is more or less inflated, generally pretty thin, enamelled, and provided with parallel, longitudinal, inclined and acute ribs.The body whorl is much larger than all the others together. The spire is slightly elevated. The aperture is large, oval, dilated, strongly emarginated inferiorly, and without siphonal canal. The outer lip is bordered by the last rib. The columella is smooth, simple, nearly straight and pointed at the base.

The animal has a flattened head, which supports a pair of long, thick, and conical tentacles, with a small protuberance at their base, internally, where the eyes are situated. the mouth is simple, surrounded by a muscular margin, and furnished with a small, slender and pointed trunk. The organ of excitement is elongated, cylindrical, situated on the right side. The locomotive organ is very large, very broad at the anterior part, which is ear-shaped, and distinguished by a deep emargination upon each side.The posterior extremity is caducous, and destitute of an operculum.

The fleshy part of this mollusk is very strong, and very large. Its foot is enormous, thick, and extended considerably out of the shell. It cannot be wholly contained within the aperture, before which, by contracting itself, it forms a margin.

The foot is as if divided into two portions. The anterior broader, arcuated, ear-shaped, with a marginal furrow, and joined to the posterior part by a kind of neck. This latter, more extended, is somewhat oval, pointed, and slightly inflated above, without any appearance of operculum. When the animal is violently disturbed, it breaks off the posterior extremity of its foot, in order to withdraw itself more completely within its shell. In consequence of this an operculum would be useless to it, for it would be liable to be carried away by the rupture of the foot. Therefore, it is not possessed.

All the external parts of the animal are strongly colored with spots and plates of a brownish red, intermingled with other yellowish spots. The middle portion is frequently crossed by a brown band.

The respiratory tube is long, rather large, continued to and terminating in a large pulmonary cavity, the use of which is to assist respiration. Upon one side of this cavity are two pectinated branchiae, one large, and the other small. On the opposite side are situated, in female specimens, the rectum and the uterus; and in the male a deferential canal and a penis. On this same side are fixed, at the upper part of the cavity, the mucous follicles, composed of seven or eight transverse plates. The tongue is small, slender, pointed, fleshy, without any trace of a ribbon of horn. It is contained in an incurved sheath, and rarely protruded from it. The stomach is very narrow, and does not differ in size from the rest of the intestinal canal. The rectum is pretty large, terminated by an anus slightly narrowed and pointed. The liver, which is voluminous, forms a great part of the convoluted portion, and extends almost throughout the spire. The heart and the auricle are very much developed, contained in a pericardium, and situated at the base of the branchiae. The cerebral ganglion is broad and flattened; it sends out numerous nervous filaments which ramify over the whole body. The penis of the male is considerable and situated upon the same side.

This genus are voracious nocturnal predators of benthic crustaceans on sandy bottoms, capable of eating crabs as large as themselves.

== Distribution ==
This marine species is circumtropical, except the western Atlantic Ocean. It also occurs off Australia (Northern Territory, Queensland, Western Australia).

== Species ==
Species in the genus Harpa include:

- Harpa amouretta Röding, 1798
- Harpa articularis Lamarck, 1822
- Harpa cabriti P. Fischer, 1860
- Harpa costata (Linnaeus, 1758)
- Harpa crenata Swainson, 1822
- Harpa davidis Röding, 1798
- Harpa doris Röding, 1798
- Harpa goodwini Rehder, 1993
- Harpa gracilis Broderip & G. B. Sowerby I, 1829
- Harpa harpa (Linnaeus, 1758)
- Harpa kajiyamai Habe, 1970
- Harpa kolaceki T. Cossignani, 2011
- Harpa lorenzi D. Monsecour & K. Monsecour, 2018
- Harpa major Röding, 1798
- Harpa queenslandica Berschauer & Petuch, 2016

Species brought into synonymy

- Harpa conoidalis Lamarck, 1822
- Harpa crassa Krauss, 1848
- Harpa kawamurai Habe, 1970
- Harpa laetifica Melvill, 1916
- Harpa ligata Menke, 1828
- Harpa minor Lamarck, 1822
- Harpa multicostata G. B. Sowerby I, 1822
- Harpa nablium Mörch, 1852
- † Harpa neozelanica Suter, 1917
- Harpa nobilis Lamarck, 1822
- † Harpa pulligera Tate, 1889
- Harpa robusta Röding, 1798
- Harpa rosea Lamarck, 1816
- Harpa striata] Lamarck, 1816
- Harpa ventricosa Lamarck, 1816
- Harpa ventricosa Lamarck, 1801

Nomen dubium

- Harpa fulvomichaelensis Orga, 1999
- Harpa urniformis Perry, 1811
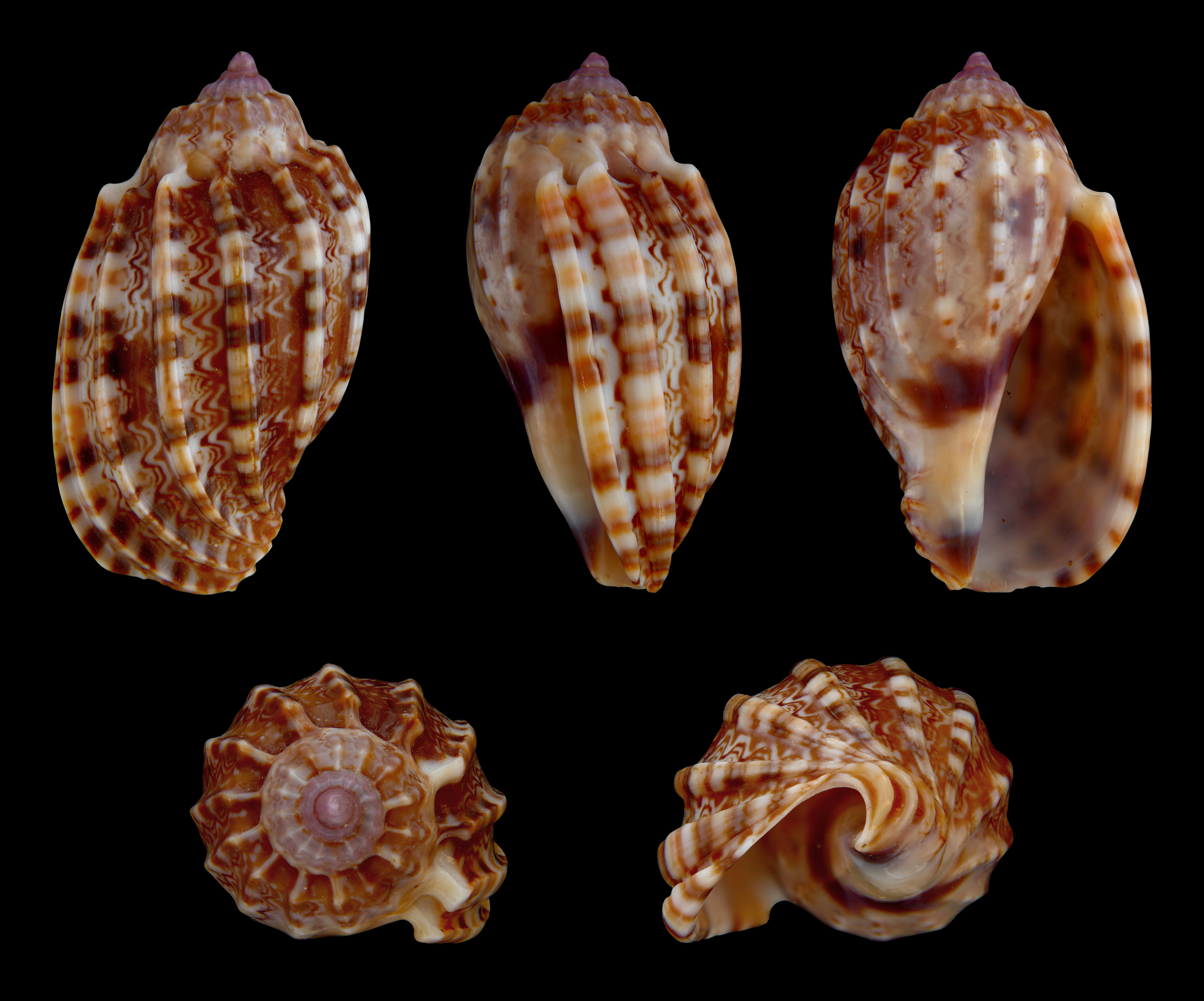
Harpa amouretta

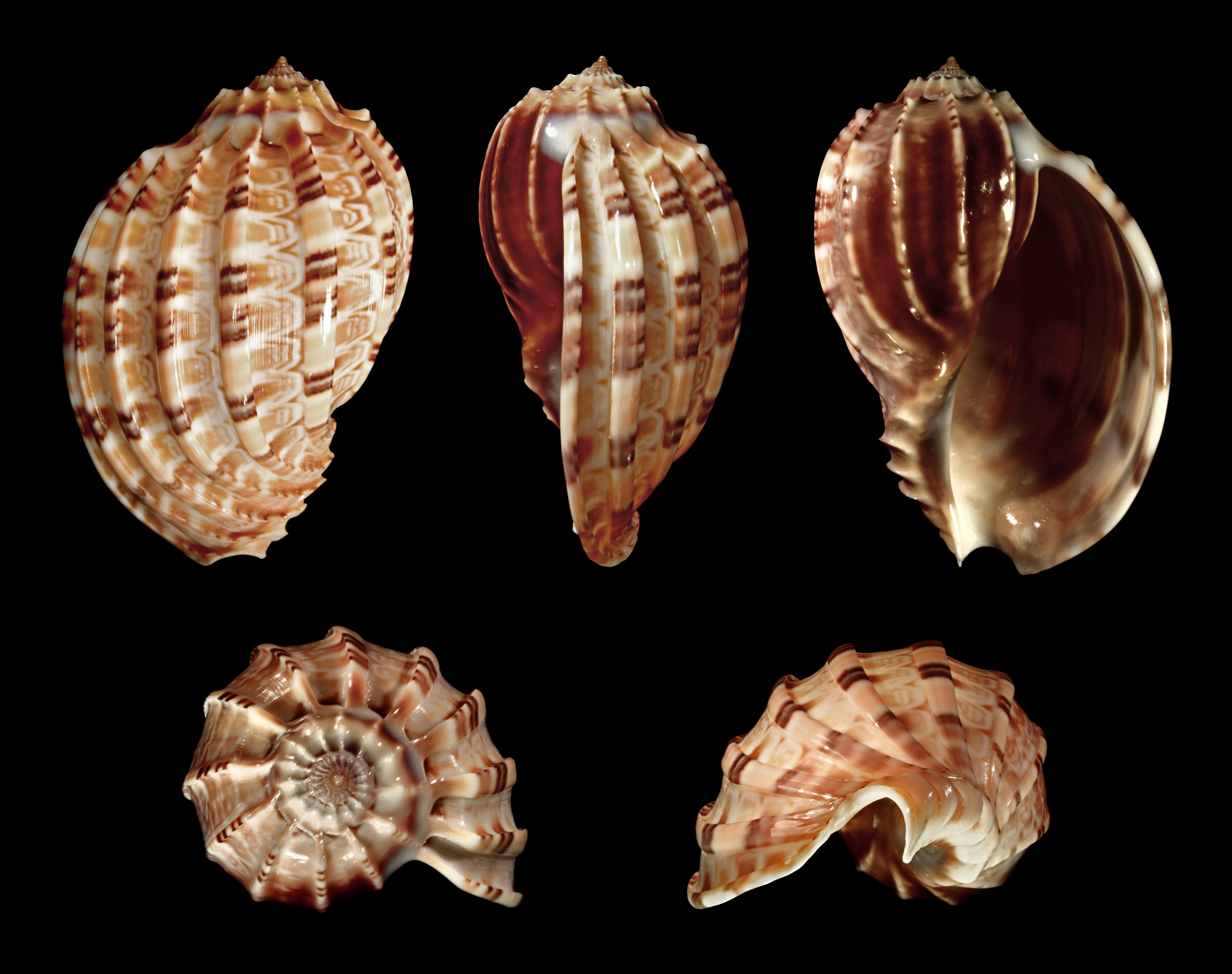
Harpa articularis

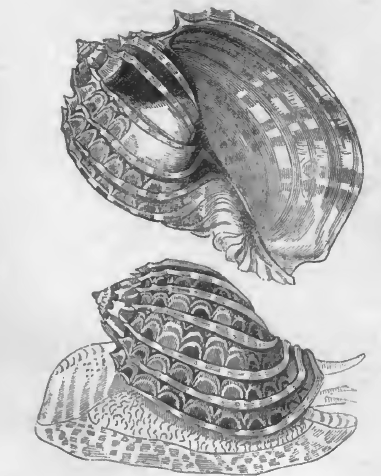
Harpa ventricosa

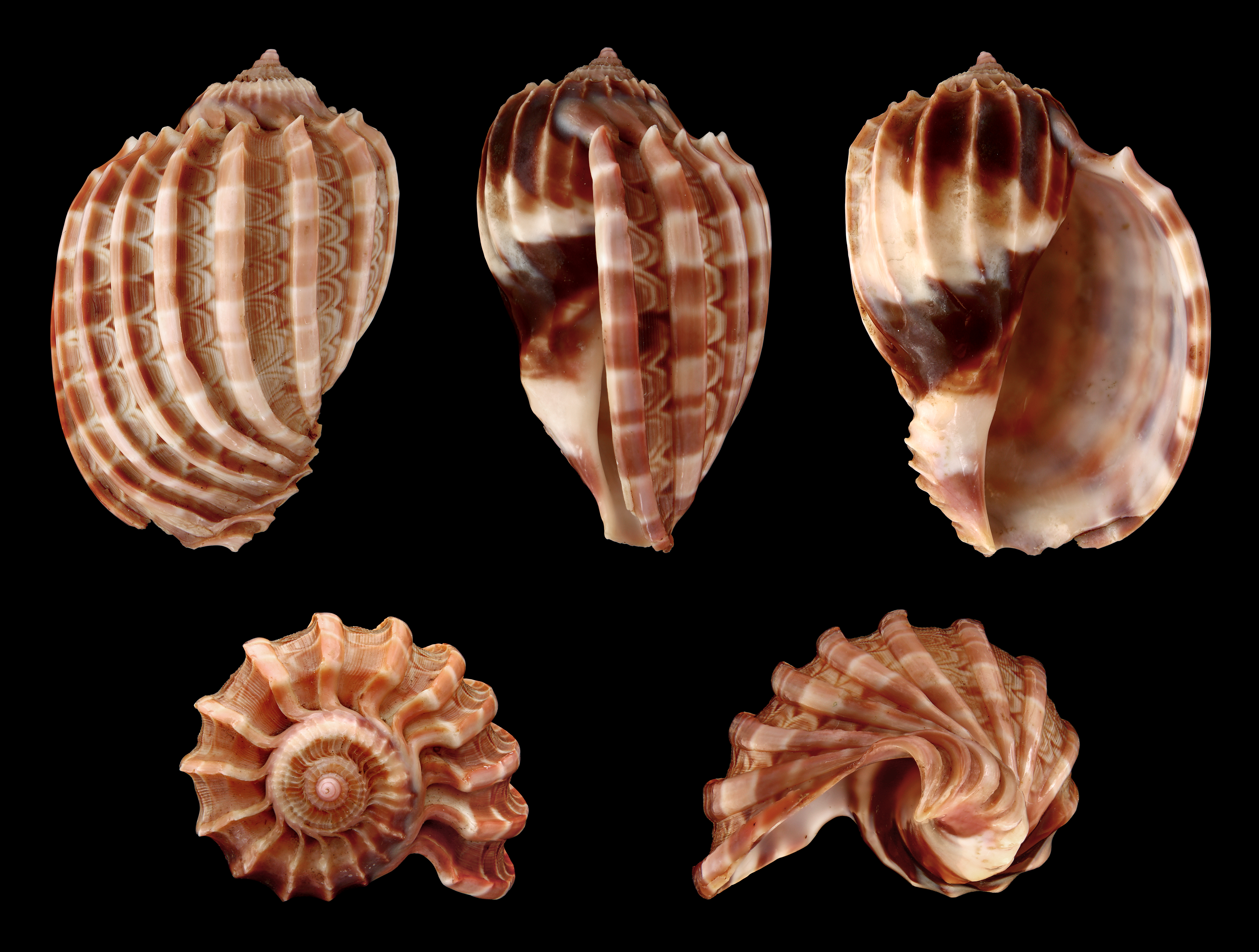
Harpa davidis

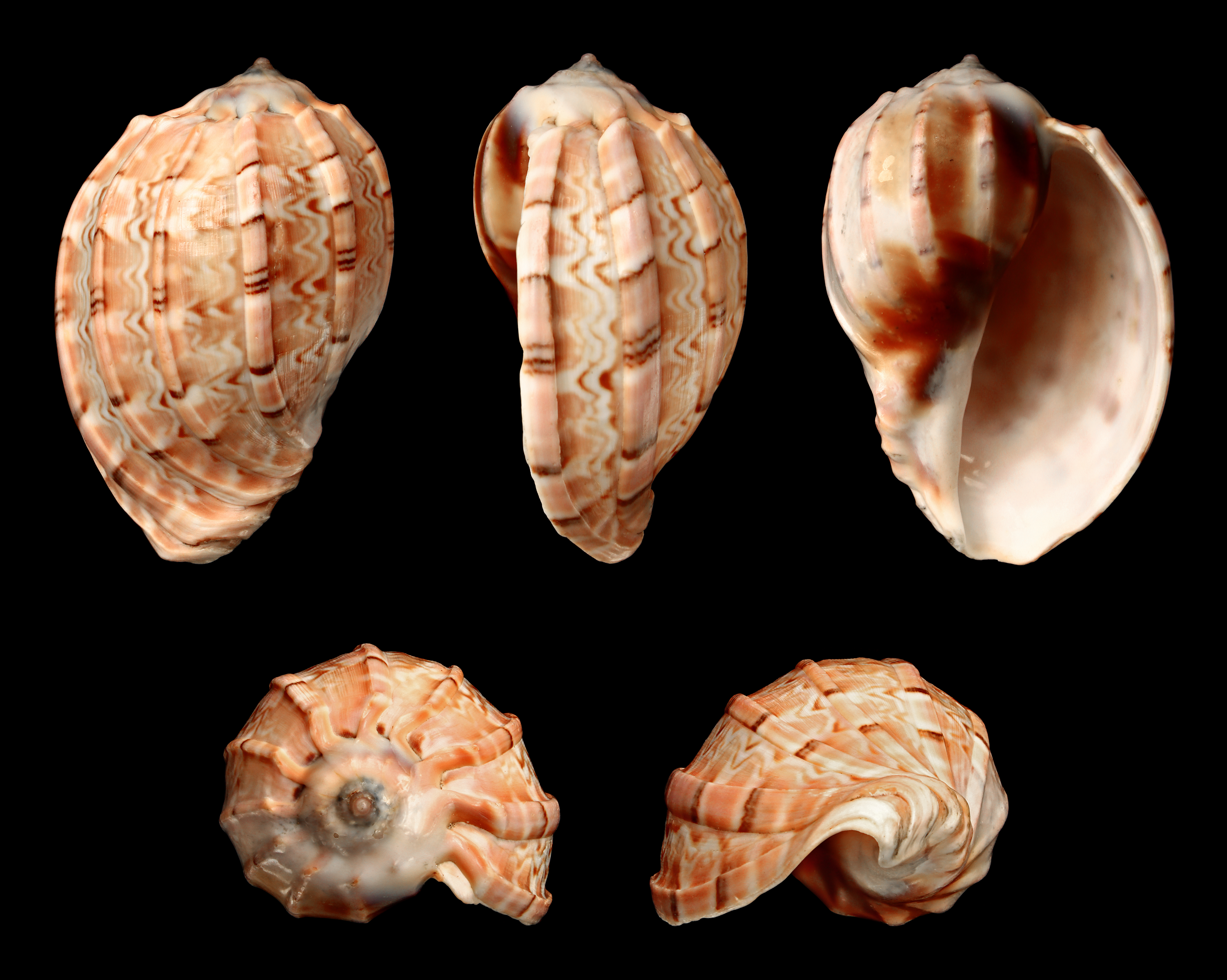
Harpa harpa

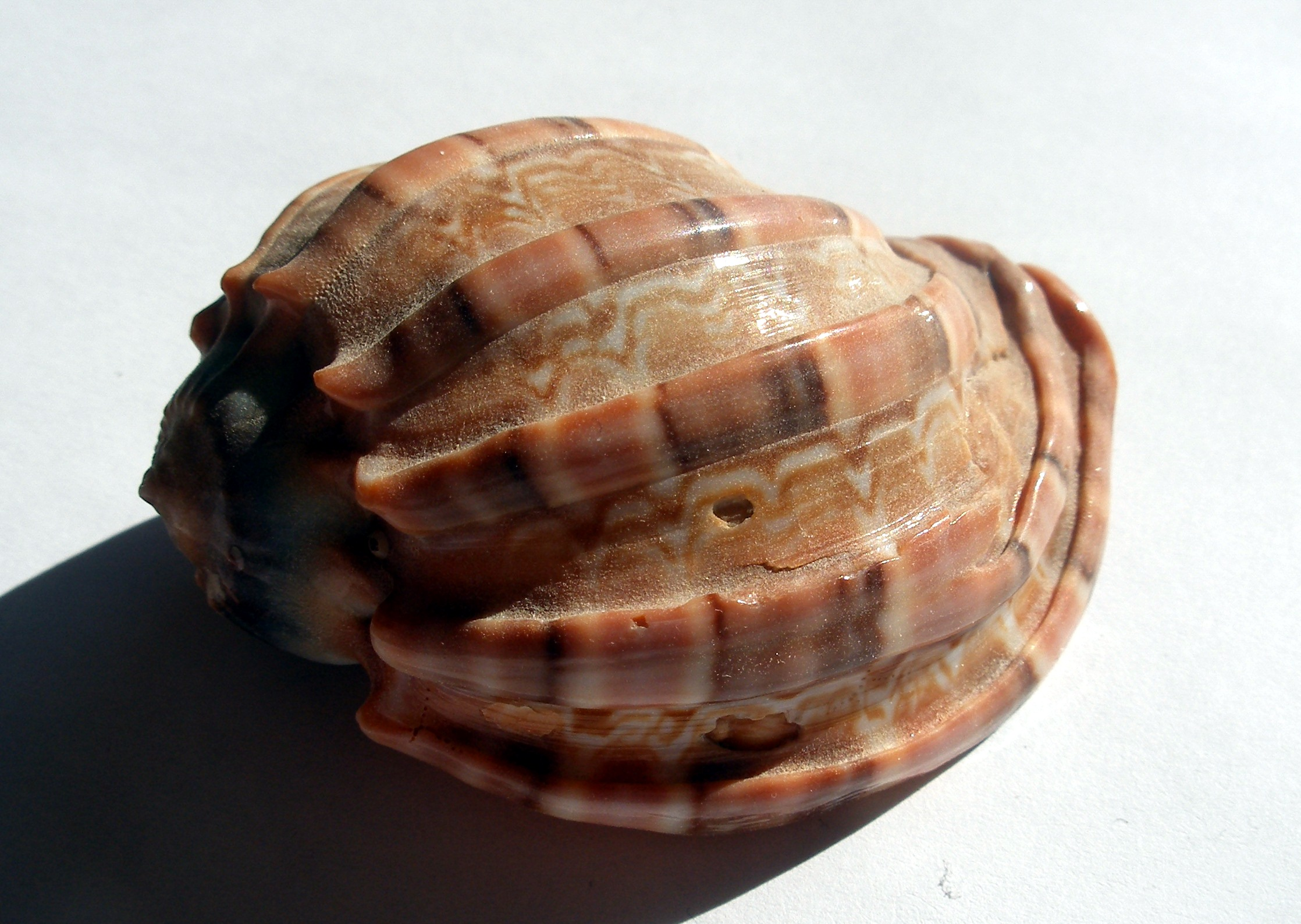
Harpa doris

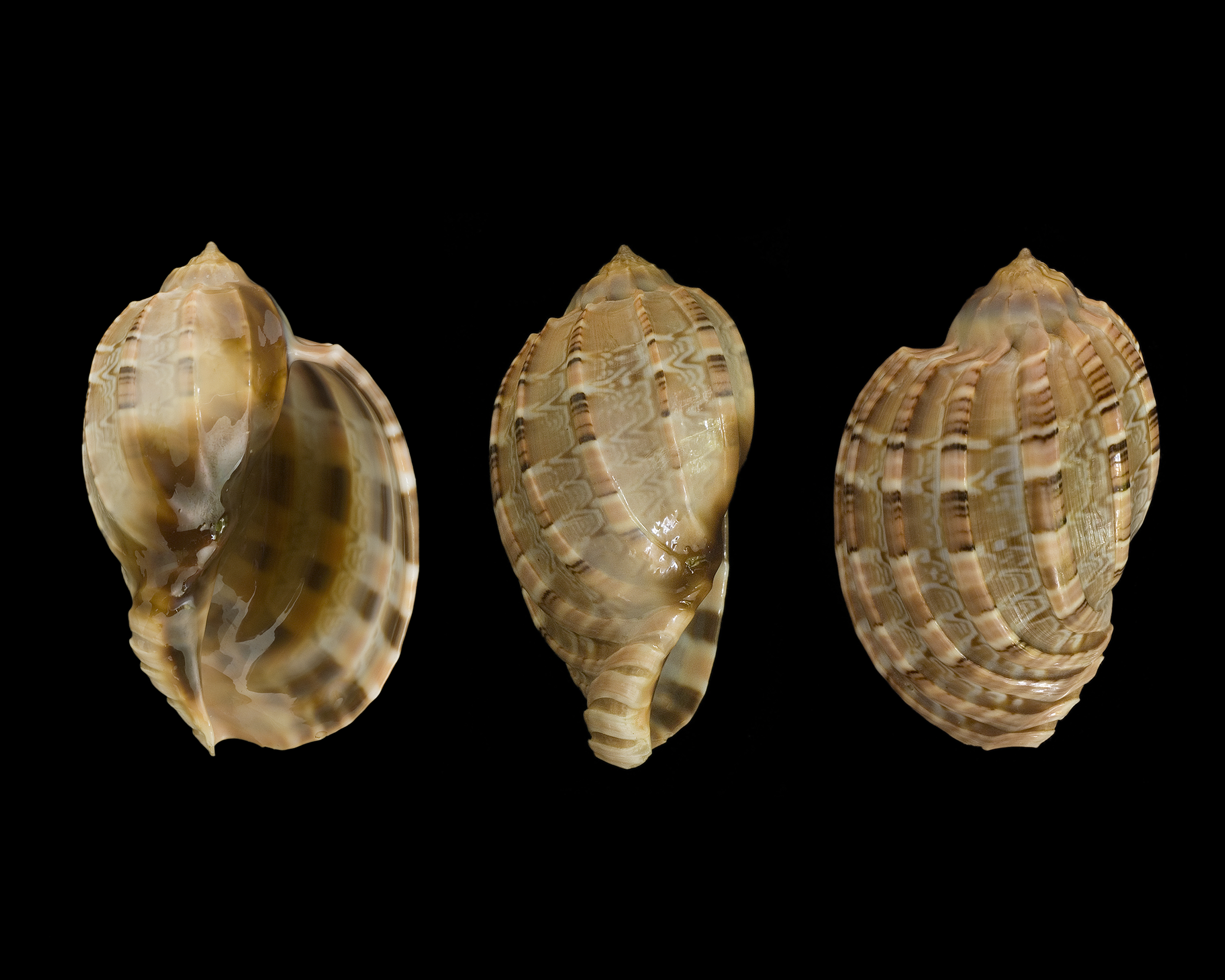
Harpa major
