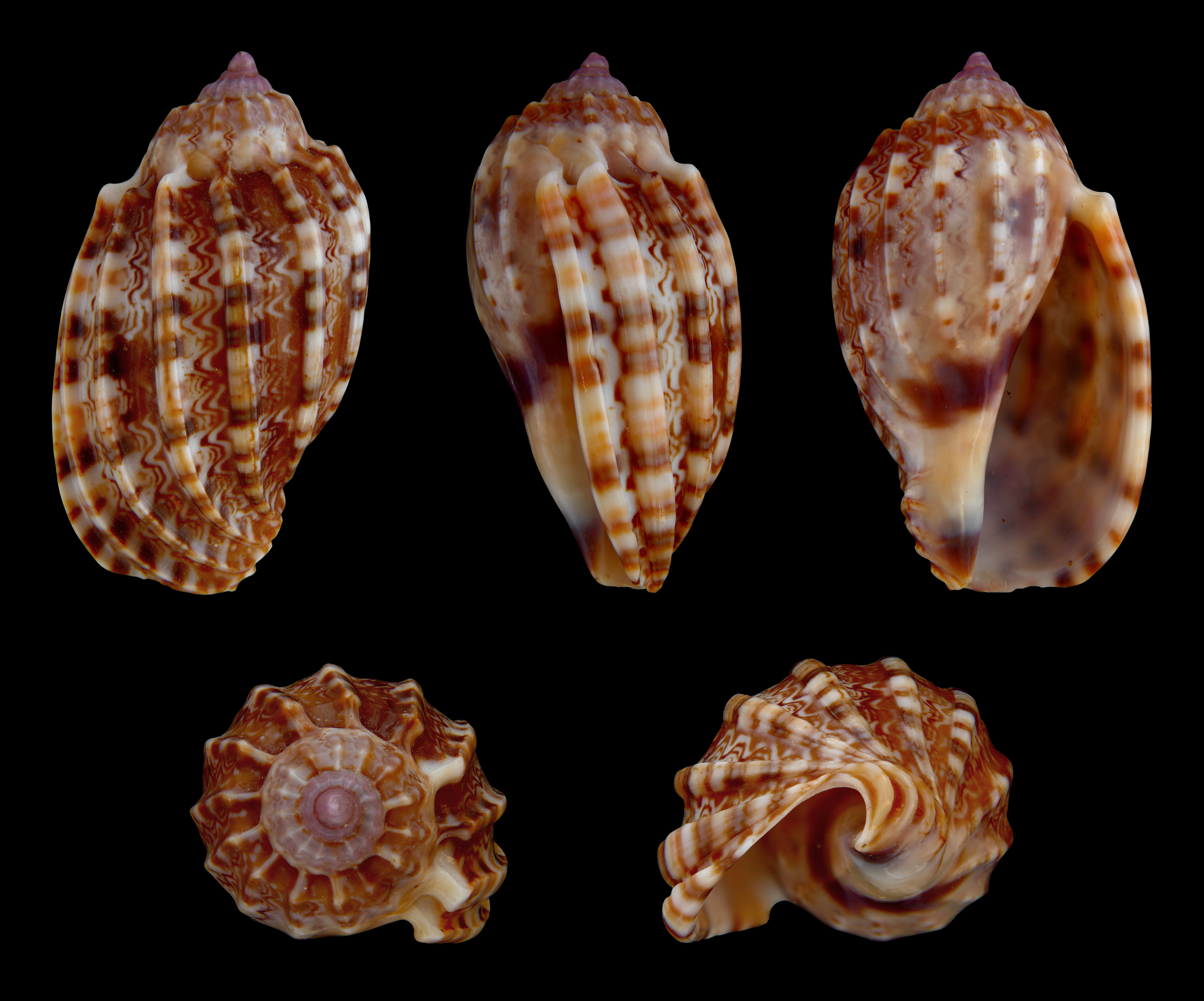

Scientific classification
- Kingdom: Animalia
- Phylum: Mollusca
- Class: Gastropoda
- Subclass: Caenogastropoda
- Order: Neogastropoda
- Family: Harpidae
- Genus: Harpa
- Species: H. amouretta

Binomial name
- Harpa amouretta Röding, 1798

Synonyms
- Harpa crassa Krauss, 1848; Harpa minor Lamarck, 1822; Harpa oblonga Schumacher, H.C.F., 1817; Harpa solidula Adams, A., 1854; Harpa virginalis Gray, J.E. in Sowerby, G.B. II, 1870; Harpalis amoretta Link, H.F. 1807

= Harpa amouretta =

Species of gastropod

Harpa amouretta, common name the lesser harp, is a species of sea snail, a marine gastropod mollusk in the family Harpidae, the harp snails.

== Description ==
As Harpa harpa, up to 7 cm, with 11–14 axial ribs and higher spire. Colour white with cream and pale brown banding. Columella with large, central purple blotch; aperture white.

The ovate shell is oblong. It is rather small and slightly elongated. The whorls of the spire are distinct and mucronated (= ending in an abruptly tapering point). The body whorl has eleven or twelve narrow and slightly elevated longitudinal ribs, the surface of which, of a yellow ground, is crossed transversely by a great number of very fine blackish lines, which approach alternately, two by two. The intervals of the ribs are marked with very thin and delicate longitudinal striae, and with brown and whitish lines undulating in bars. Sometimes one or two whitish bands are observed upon the body whorl. The aperture is ovate, alike whitish, with several small brown bands upon the edge of the outer lip which, externally, is covered by the last rib. The columella is almost straight and is marked with small brown spots.

== Distribution ==
This marine species occurs in the Red Sea; in the Indian Ocean from Northern Transkei, South Africa to East Africa (Somalia, Tanzania, Mozambique, Kenya, Madagascar), off the Mascarene Basin, Aldabra, Chagos, Reunion, Seychelles; in the Indo-West Pacific; off New Zealand and Australia (Northern Territory, Queensland, Western Australia). There are insufficient records to support a continuous distribution across northern Australia.

== Habitat ==
Shallow and deep sands.

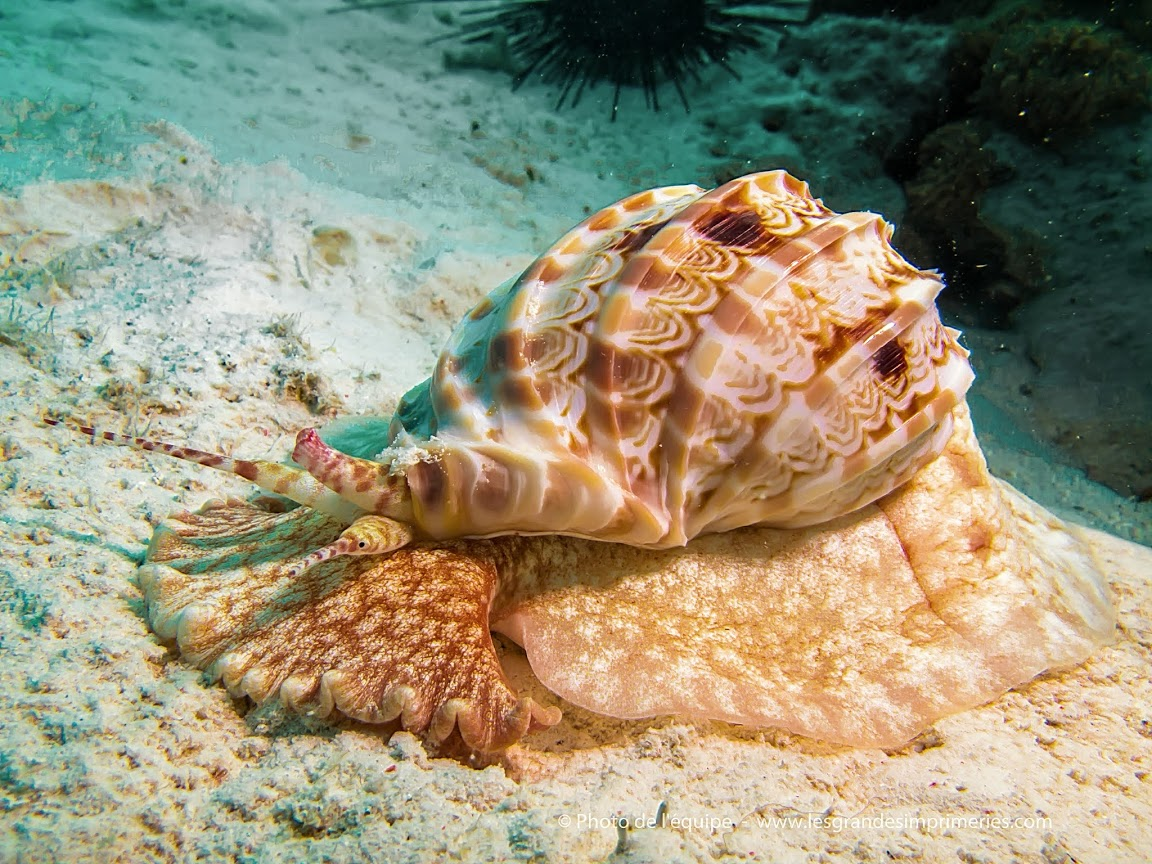
A live specimen of Harpa amouretta
