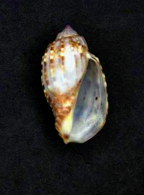
- Shell of Harpa gracilis (museum specimen at Naturalis Biodiversity Center)

Scientific classification
- Kingdom: Animalia
- Phylum: Mollusca
- Class: Gastropoda
- Subclass: Caenogastropoda
- Order: Neogastropoda
- Family: Harpidae
- Genus: Harpa
- Species: H. gracilis

Binomial name
- Harpa gracilis Broderip & Sowerby I, 1829

= Harpa gracilis =

Species of gastropod

Harpa gracilis, common name the Polynesian harp, is a species of sea snail, a marine gastropod mollusk in the family Harpidae, the harp snails.

== Description ==
The size of the shell varies between 20 mm and 42 mm.

== Distribution ==
This marine species occurs in Polynesia and off Clipperton Island.
