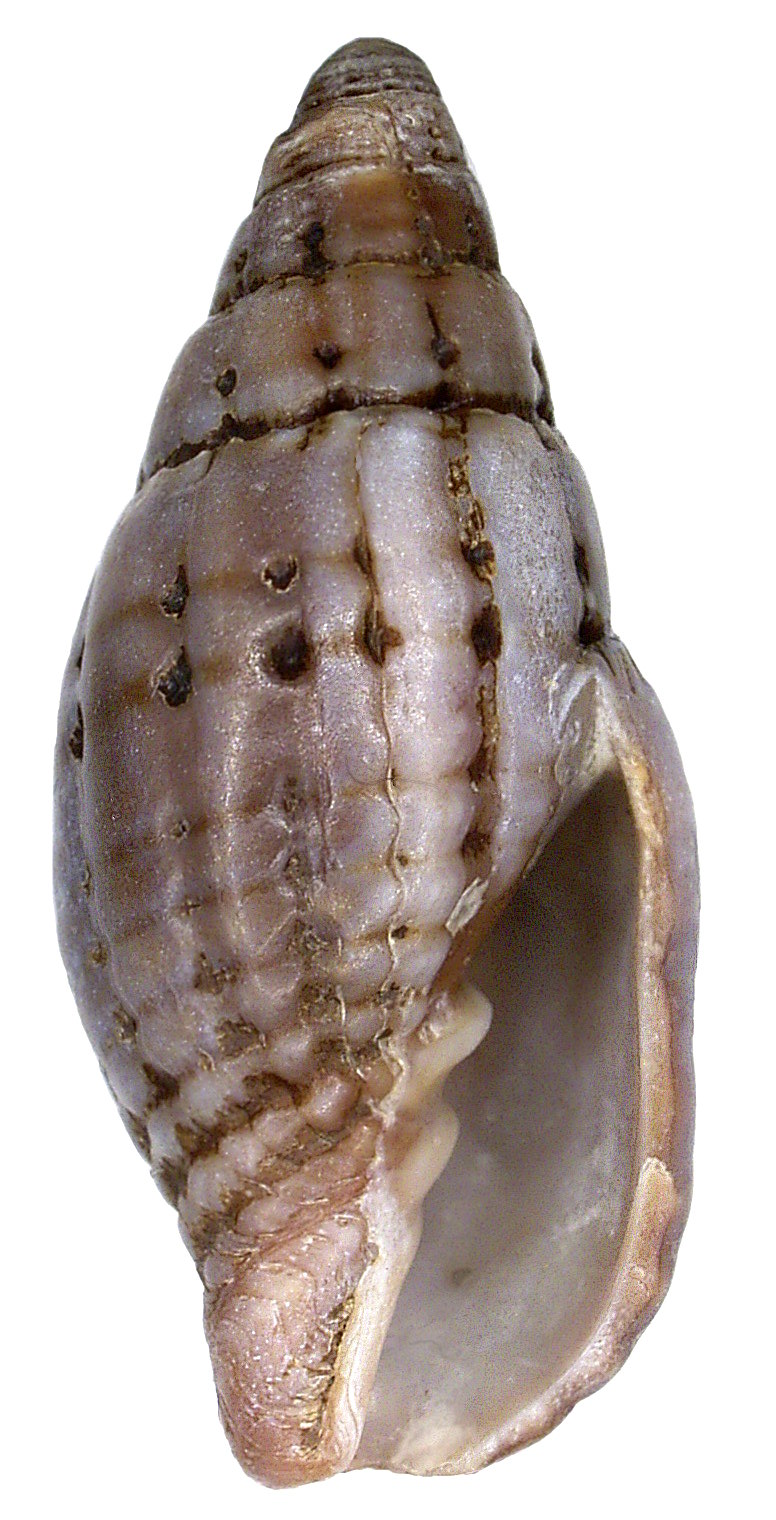
- Shell of Neotiara lens (neotype at MNHN, Paris)

Scientific classification
- Kingdom: Animalia
- Phylum: Mollusca
- Class: Gastropoda
- Subclass: Caenogastropoda
- Order: Neogastropoda
- Family: Mitridae
- Genus: Neotiara
- Species: N. lens

Binomial name
- Neotiara lens (Wood, 1828)

Synonyms
- Mitra (Nebularia) lens (W. Wood, 1828); Mitra lens (W. Wood, 1828); Voluta lens W. Wood, 1828 (original combination)

= Neotiara lens =

Species of gastropod

Neotiara lens is a species of sea snail, a marine gastropod mollusk in the family Mitridae, the miters or miter snails.

== Description ==
The length of the shell is documented to be 23 - 77 mm.

== Distribution ==
This marine species occurs in the Gulf of Panama.
