= Eupithecia crenata =

Scientific classification
- Kingdom: Animalia
- Phylum: Arthropoda
- Clade: Pancrustacea
- Class: Insecta
- Order: Lepidoptera
- Family: Geometridae
- Genus: Eupithecia
- Species: E. crenata

Binomial name
- Eupithecia crenata Vojnits, 1975

Species of moth

Eupithecia crenata is a moth in the family Geometridae. It is found in Armenia.
