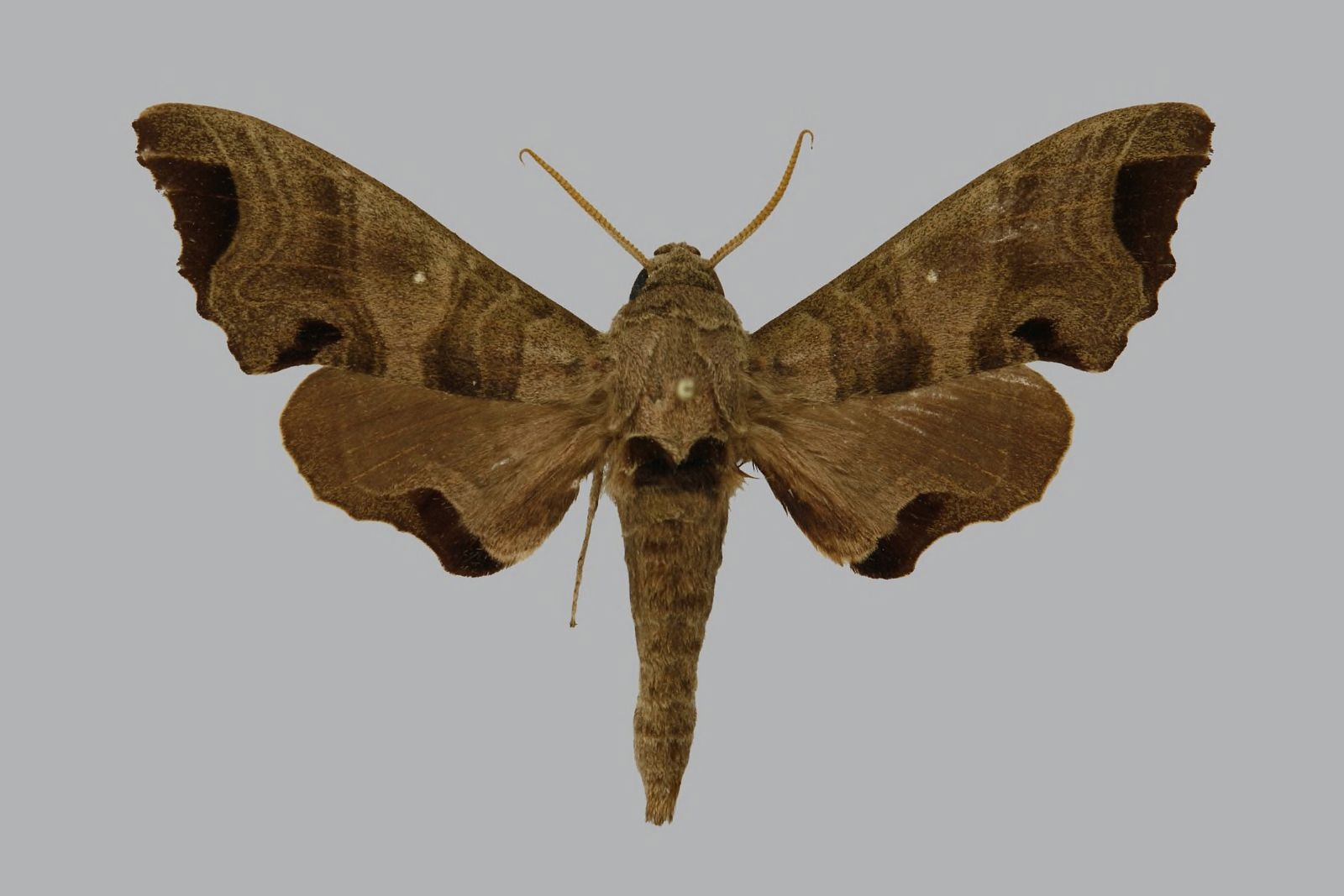
- Likoma crenata

Scientific classification
- Domain: Eukaryota
- Kingdom: Animalia
- Phylum: Arthropoda
- Class: Insecta
- Order: Lepidoptera
- Family: Sphingidae
- Subfamily: Smerinthinae
- Tribe: Smerinthini
- Genus: Likoma; Rothschild & Jordan, 1903

= Likoma (moth) =

Genus of moths

Likoma is a genus of moths in the family Sphingidae first described by Walter Rothschild and Karl Jordan in 1903.

== Species ==
- Likoma apicalis (Rothschild & Jordan 1903)
- Likoma crenata Rothschild & Jordan 1907
