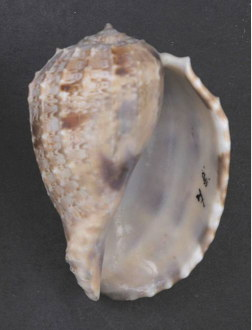
- Shell of Harpa crenata (museum specimen at Naturalis Biodiversity Center)

Scientific classification
- Kingdom: Animalia
- Phylum: Mollusca
- Class: Gastropoda
- Subclass: Caenogastropoda
- Order: Neogastropoda
- Family: Harpidae
- Genus: Harpa
- Species: H. crenata

Binomial name
- Harpa crenata Swainson, 1822

= Harpa crenata =

Species of gastropod

Harpa crenata, common name the Panama harp, is a species of sea snail, a marine gastropod mollusk in the family Harpidae, the harp snails.

== Description ==
The size of the shell varies between 50 mm and 100 mm.

== Distribution ==
This marine species occurs in the Gulf of California, Western Mexico down to Peru.
