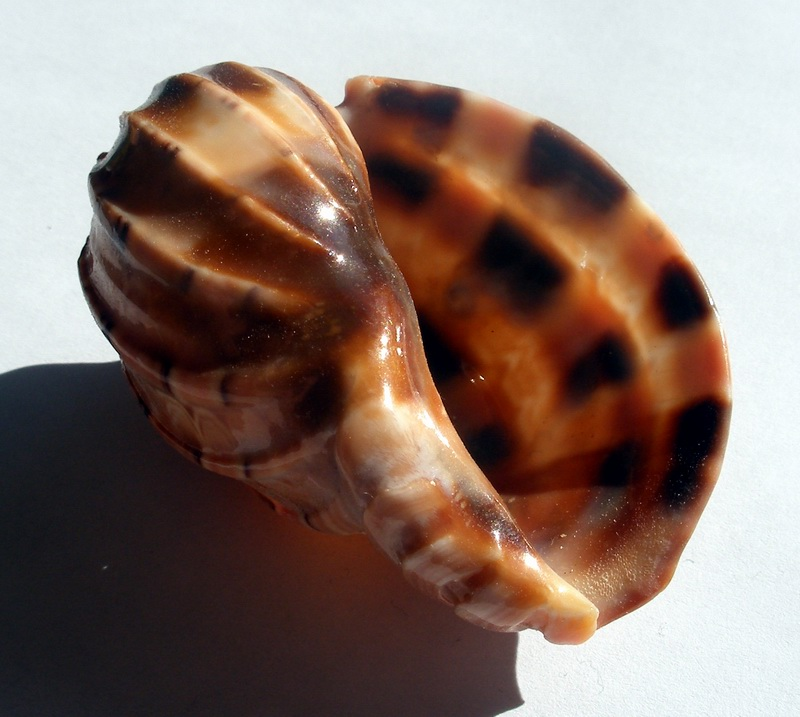
- Apertural view of a shell of Harpa doris

Scientific classification
- Kingdom: Animalia
- Phylum: Mollusca
- Class: Gastropoda
- Subclass: Caenogastropoda
- Order: Neogastropoda
- Family: Harpidae
- Genus: Harpa
- Species: H. doris

Binomial name
- Harpa doris Röding, 1798

Synonyms
- Harpa robusta Röding, 1798; Harpa rosea Lamarck, 1816

= Harpa doris =

Species of gastropod

Harpa doris, common name the rose harp, is a species of sea snail, a marine gastropod mollusk in the family Harpidae, the harp snails.

== Description ==
The size of the shell varies between 30 mm and 81 mm.

The rather thin shell is ovate and ventricose. The conical spire is slightly muricated (= covered with short, sharp points). The four whorls near the edge are the widest. The ribs are flat, often narrow, almost all marked at their base by four or five conical denticulations, and at the upper extremity of the body whorl, by four small mucronated tubercles, which appear again upon the whorls of the spire. The coloring of the ribs is of a light gray. They are circled by rose-colored or white bands in bars. At their external edge, which is slightly projecting, is drawn a brown or blackish longitudinal stroke, interrupted by small horizontal white rays. The interstices of the ribs are of a grayish pearl color, waved with fine strokes in double bars, which are laced with strokes of a red brown. Rose-colored spots are likewise seen between the ribs. The ovate aperture is of a pale yellow, with several bands of a dark violet. The outer lip is ornamented by the last rib, which is undulated throughout its whole length. The columella is polished, arcuated towards the base, and has two or three spots of a bluish violet.

== Distribution ==
This marine species occurs, buried in sand near rocks, in the Atlantic Ocean off Cape Verde, West Africa, Gabon, Angola, as well as off Ascension Island in the South Atlantic.
