= Neotiara crenata =

Scientific classification
- Kingdom: Animalia
- Phylum: Mollusca
- Class: Gastropoda
- Subclass: Caenogastropoda
- Order: Neogastropoda
- Family: Mitridae
- Genus: Neotiara
- Species: N. crenata

Binomial name
- Neotiara crenata (Broderip, 1836)

Synonyms
- Mitra crenata (Broderip, 1836)

Species of gastropod

Neotiara crenata is a species of sea snail, a marine gastropod mollusk in the family Mitridae, the miters or miter snails.
