= Eugenia crenata =

Scientific classification
- Kingdom: Plantae
- Clade: Tracheophytes
- Clade: Angiosperms
- Clade: Eudicots
- Clade: Rosids
- Order: Myrtales
- Family: Myrtaceae
- Genus: Eugenia
- Species: E. crenata

Binomial name
- Eugenia crenata Vell.

Synonyms
- Eugenia velloziana O.Berg, nom. illeg.

Species of flowering plant

Eugenia crenata is a species of flowering plant in the family Myrtaceae. It is a shrub or tree native to the state of Rio de Janeiro in southeastern Brazil.

The species was described by José Mariano de Conceição Vellozo in 1829.
