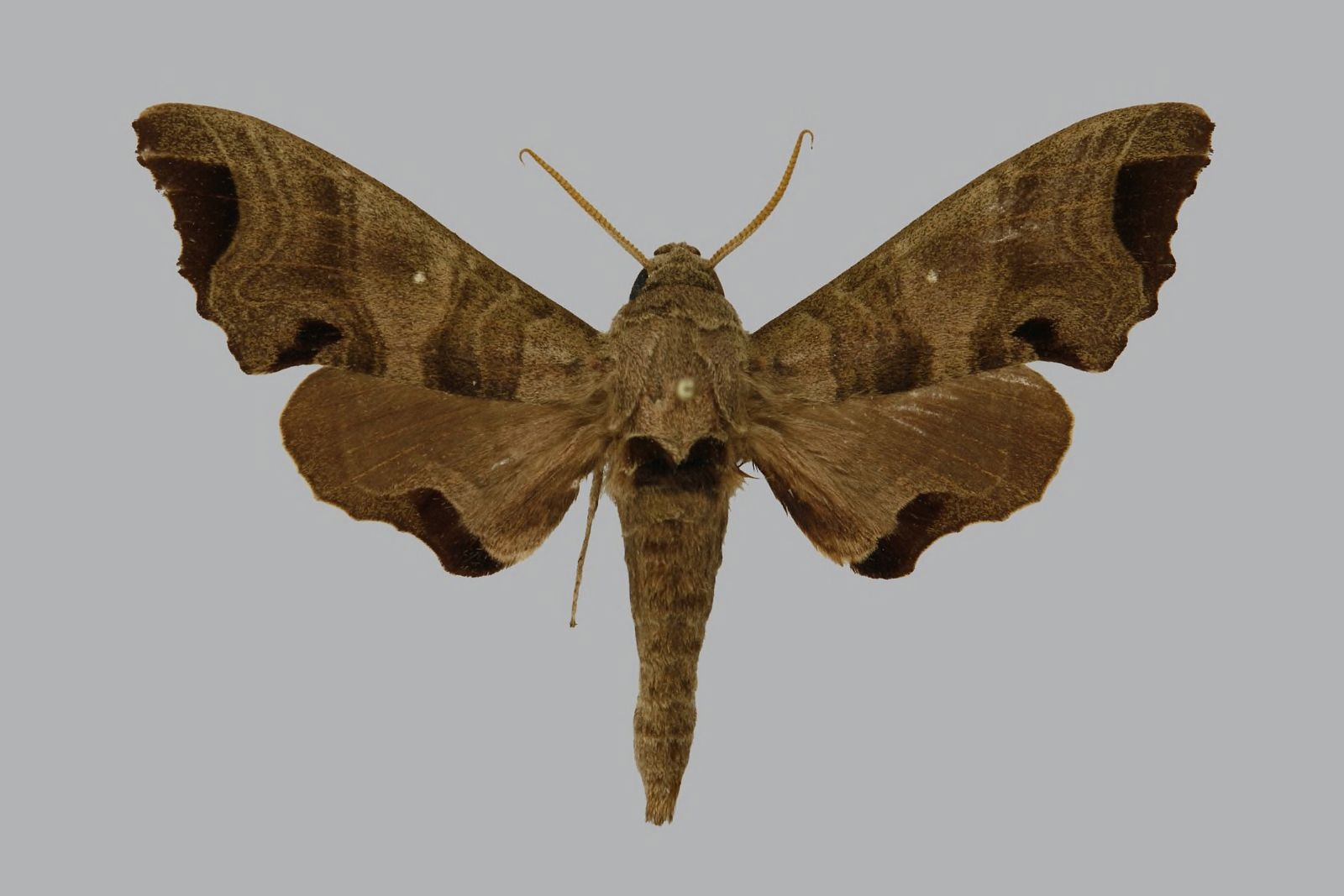

Scientific classification
- Domain: Eukaryota
- Kingdom: Animalia
- Phylum: Arthropoda
- Class: Insecta
- Order: Lepidoptera
- Family: Sphingidae
- Genus: Likoma
- Species: L. crenata

Binomial name
- Likoma crenata Rothschild & Jordan, 1907

= Likoma crenata =

Species of moth

Likoma crenata is a moth of the family Sphingidae. It is known from the coast of Somalia, Kenya and Tanzania.
