= Harpinae =

Scientific classification
- Kingdom: Animalia
- Phylum: Mollusca
- Class: Gastropoda
- Subclass: Caenogastropoda
- Order: Neogastropoda
- Family: Harpidae
- Subfamily: Harpinae; Bronn, 1849

Subfamily of sea snails

Harpinae is a subfamily of sea snails within the family Harpidae.

== Description ==
Animal: The head and tentacles are exposed. The eyes are conspicuous and developed. The mantle is simple, enclosed, without a tapering appendage in front. The foot is large, flat, not reflexed on the sides of the shell.

Operculum none.

Shell: The shell is ventricose. The whorls are ribbed. The inner lip is simple anteriorly.

== Genera ==
- Austroharpa Finlay, 1931
- † Eocithara P. Fischer, 1883
- Harpa Röding, 1798

Synonyms

- † Deniharpa Iredale, 1931: synonym of Austroharpa Finlay, 1931 (unavailable name: no description)
- Harpalis Link, 1807: synonym of Harpa Röding, 1798
- Palamharpa Iredale, 1931: synonym of Austroharpa Finlay, 1931
- † Refluharpa Iredale, 1931: synonym of † Eocithara (Refluharpa) Rehder, 1973: synonym of † Eocithara P. Fischer, 1883 (unavailable name: no description)
- † Trameharpa Iredale, 1931: synonym of Austroharpa Finlay, 1931 (unavailable name: no description
