= Morum ninomiyai =

Scientific classification
- Kingdom: Animalia
- Phylum: Mollusca
- Class: Gastropoda
- Subclass: Caenogastropoda
- Order: Neogastropoda
- Family: Harpidae
- Genus: Morum
- Species: M. ninomiyai

Binomial name
- Morum ninomiyai Emerson, 1986

Species of gastropod

Morum ninomiyai is a species of sea snail, a marine gastropod mollusk in the family Harpidae, the harp snails.
