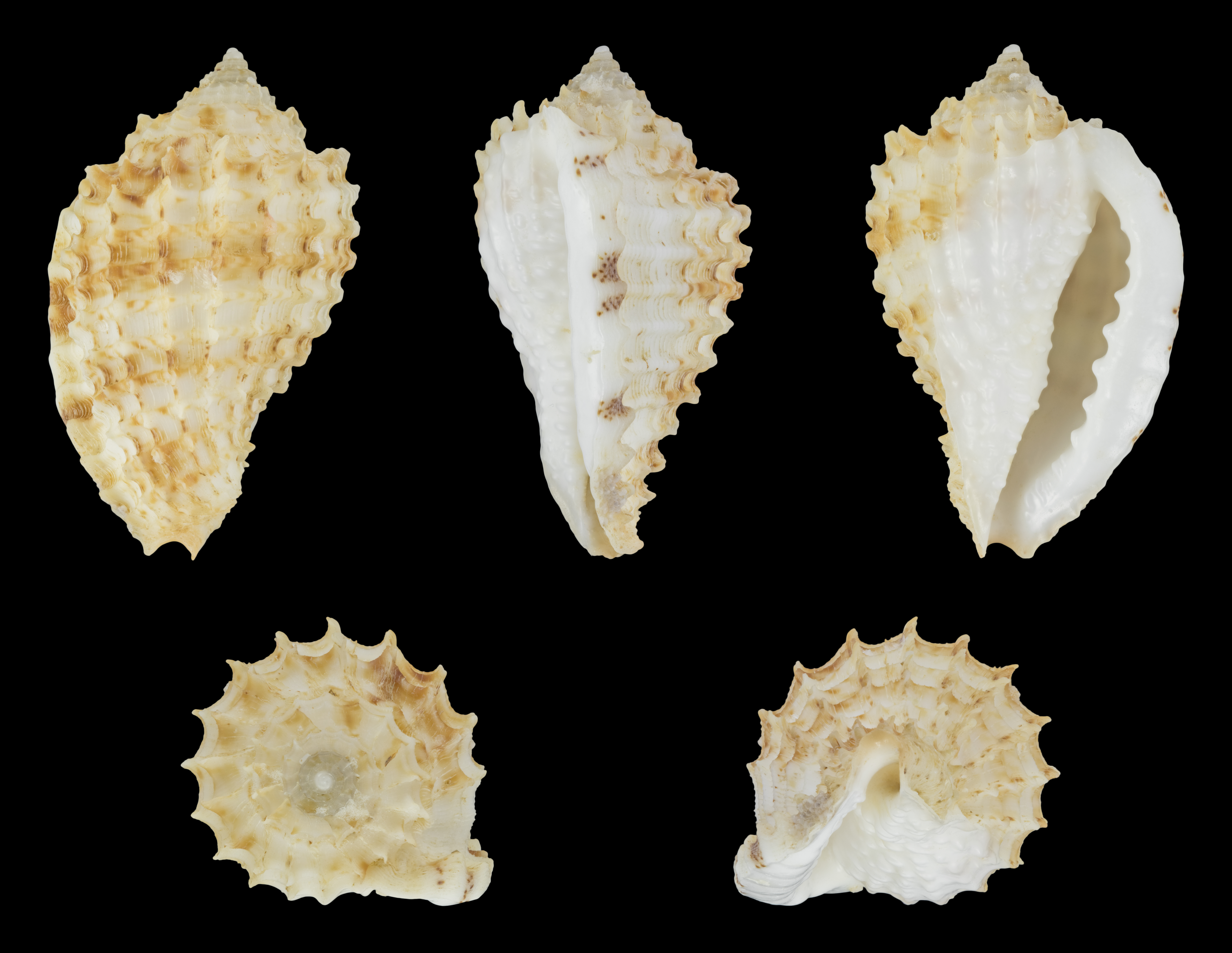

Scientific classification
- Kingdom: Animalia
- Phylum: Mollusca
- Class: Gastropoda
- Subclass: Caenogastropoda
- Order: Neogastropoda
- Family: Harpidae
- Genus: Morum
- Species: M. joelgreenei

Binomial name
- Morum joelgreenei Emerson, 1981

= Morum joelgreenei =

Species of gastropod

Morum joelgreenei is a species of sea snail, a marine gastropod mollusk in the family Harpidae, the harp snails.
