= Morum matthewsi =

Scientific classification
- Kingdom: Animalia
- Phylum: Mollusca
- Class: Gastropoda
- Subclass: Caenogastropoda
- Order: Neogastropoda
- Family: Harpidae
- Genus: Morum
- Species: M. matthewsi

Binomial name
- Morum matthewsi Emerson, 1967

Species of gastropod

Morum matthewsi is a species of sea snail, a marine gastropod mollusk in the family Harpidae, the harp snails.

== Description ==
Shell size is 25 mm.

== Distribution ==
Western Atlantic: Brazil.
