= Morum watsoni =

Scientific classification
- Kingdom: Animalia
- Phylum: Mollusca
- Class: Gastropoda
- Subclass: Caenogastropoda
- Order: Neogastropoda
- Family: Harpidae
- Genus: Morum
- Species: M. watsoni

Binomial name
- Morum watsoni Dance & Emerson, 1967

Species of gastropod

Morum watsoni is a species of sea snail, a marine gastropod mollusk belonging to the family Harpidae, the harp snails.
