= Morum macdonaldi =

Scientific classification
- Kingdom: Animalia
- Phylum: Mollusca
- Class: Gastropoda
- Subclass: Caenogastropoda
- Order: Neogastropoda
- Family: Harpidae
- Genus: Morum
- Species: M. macdonaldi

Binomial name
- Morum macdonaldi Emerson, 1981

Species of gastropod

Morum macdonaldi is a species of sea snail, a marine gastropod mollusk in the family Harpidae, the harp snails.
