= Morum strombiforme =

Scientific classification
- Kingdom: Animalia
- Phylum: Mollusca
- Class: Gastropoda
- Subclass: Caenogastropoda
- Order: Neogastropoda
- Family: Harpidae
- Genus: Morum
- Species: M. strombiforme

Binomial name
- Morum strombiforme (Reeve, 1842)

Synonyms
- Morum (Morum) strombiforme (Reeve, 1842)· accepted, alternate representation; Oniscia strombiformis Reeve, 1842

Species of gastropod

Morum strombiforme is a species of sea snail, a marine gastropod mollusc in the family Harpidae, the harp snails.

== Distribution ==
From the eastern half of the Yucatán Peninsula of Mexico, eastward along the coasts of Honduras, Nicaragua, Costa Rica, and Panama, and also throughout the Greater Antilles and the Virgin Islands. Records of Morum strombiforme from Brazil are based on misidentified specimens of M. bayeri and M. berschaueri and the species does not occur within the Brazilian Province.
