= Austroharpa pulligera =

Scientific classification
- Kingdom: Animalia
- Phylum: Mollusca
- Class: Gastropoda
- Subclass: Caenogastropoda
- Order: Neogastropoda
- Family: Harpidae
- Genus: Austroharpa
- Species: †A. pulligera

Binomial name
- †Austroharpa pulligera (Tate, 1889)

Synonyms
- † Harpa pulligera Tate, 1889

Extinct species of gastropod

Austroharpa pulligera is an extinct species of sea snail, a marine gastropod mollusk, in the family Harpidae.
