= Morum finlayi =

Scientific classification
- Kingdom: Animalia
- Phylum: Mollusca
- Class: Gastropoda
- Subclass: Caenogastropoda
- Order: Neogastropoda
- Superfamily: Muricoidea
- Family: Harpidae
- Subfamily: Moruminae
- Genus: Morum
- Species: †M. finlayi

Binomial name
- †Morum finlayi (Laws, 1932)

Synonyms
- † Morum (Oniscidia) finlayi (Laws, 1932); † Oniscidia finlayi Laws, 1932

Extinct species of gastropod

Morum finlayi is an extinct species of sea snail, a marine gastropod mollusk, in the family Harpidae.
