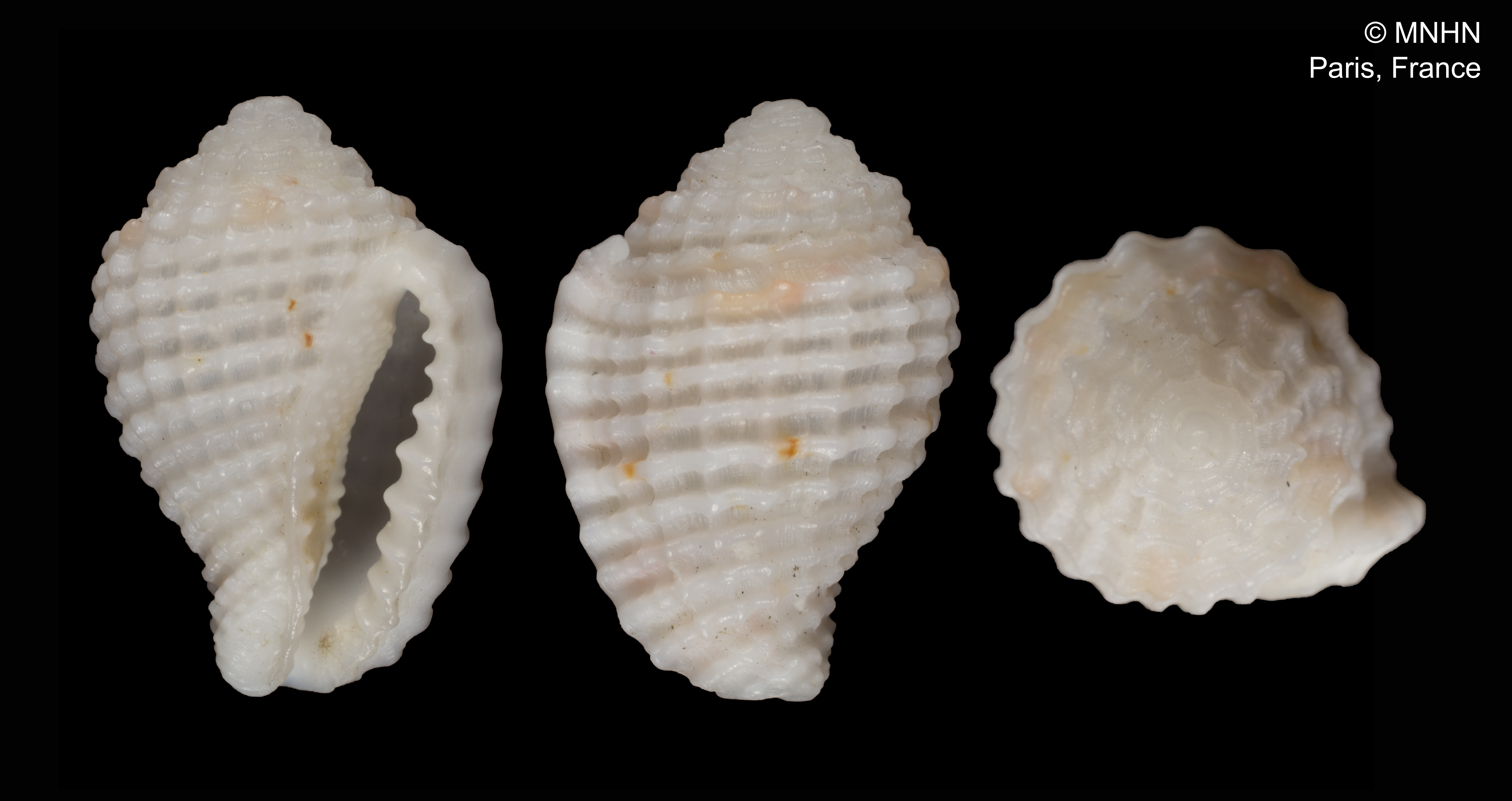
- Shell of Morum janae (holotype at MNHN, Paris)

Scientific classification
- Kingdom: Animalia
- Phylum: Mollusca
- Class: Gastropoda
- Subclass: Caenogastropoda
- Order: Neogastropoda
- Superfamily: Muricoidea
- Family: Harpidae
- Subfamily: Moruminae
- Genus: Morum
- Species: M. janae

Binomial name
- Morum janae D. Monsecour & Lorenz, 2011

Synonyms
- Morum (Oniscidia) janae D. Monsecour & Lorenz, 2011

= Morum janae =

Species of gastropod

Morum janae is a species of sea snail, a marine gastropod mollusk, in the family Harpidae.

== Description ==
The length of the shell attains 13.6 mm.

== Distribution ==
This marine species occurs off the Tuamotu Archipelago.
