= Morum kurzi =

Scientific classification
- Kingdom: Animalia
- Phylum: Mollusca
- Class: Gastropoda
- Subclass: Caenogastropoda
- Order: Neogastropoda
- Family: Harpidae
- Genus: Morum
- Species: M. kurzi

Binomial name
- Morum kurzi Petuch, 1979

Synonyms
- Morum (Oniscidia) kurzi Petuch, 1979 · accepted, alternate representation

Species of gastropod

Morum kurzi is a species of sea snail, a marine gastropod mollusk in the family Harpidae, the harp snails.

== Description ==
Original description: (Shell) "thick, stocky, pyriform with wide shoulder; spire elevated, exerted; body whorl with 12 raised cords - 8 large, prominent on body whorl proper and 4 small on anterior canal; 8 varices per whorl; large hooked spines at juncture of spiral cords and varices; at shoulder, each varix has erect, sharply pointed spine; parietal shield large, covering whole columellar area, covered with numerous pustules; outer lip crenulate, with numerous large primary and secondary teeth; protoconch erect, pappilate (see Figure 13); color pale cream with 3 tan bands, 1 on shoulder, 2 on either side of midbody line; base color pattern overlaid with numerous dark brown fleckings; protoconch and first three whorls bright pink-purple; parietal shield bright orange-pink with white pustules; outer lip orange with white teeth; interior of aperture white. In Figure 12, the holotype is coated with magnesium oxide to enhance the characteristic sculpture pattern."

== Distribution ==
Locus typicus: "250 metres depth off Panglao, Bohol Isl., Philippines."
