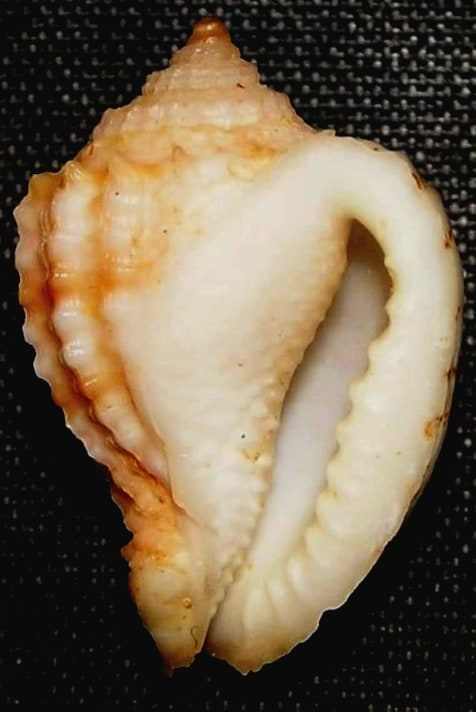
- Underside view of the seashell of Morum praeclarum

Scientific classification
- Kingdom: Animalia
- Phylum: Mollusca
- Class: Gastropoda
- Subclass: Caenogastropoda
- Order: Neogastropoda
- Family: Harpidae
- Genus: Morum
- Species: M. praeclarum

Binomial name
- Morum praeclarum Melvill, 1919

= Morum praeclarum =

Species of gastropod

Morum praeclarum is a species of sea snail, a marine gastropod mollusc in the family Harpidae, the harp snails.

== Distribution ==
Deep water, western Indian Ocean.
