= Morum concilium =

Scientific classification
- Kingdom: Animalia
- Phylum: Mollusca
- Class: Gastropoda
- Subclass: Caenogastropoda
- Order: Neogastropoda
- Superfamily: Muricoidea
- Family: Harpidae
- Subfamily: Moruminae
- Genus: Morum
- Species: M. concilium

Binomial name
- Morum concilium D. Monsecour, K. Monsecour & Lorenz, 2018

Synonyms
- Morum (Oniscidia) concilium D. Monsecour, K. Monsecour & Lorenz, 2018

Species of gastropod

Morum concilium is a species of sea snail, a marine gastropod mollusk, in the family Harpidae.

== Distribution ==
This species occurs in Mozambique.
