= Morum teramachii =

Scientific classification
- Kingdom: Animalia
- Phylum: Mollusca
- Class: Gastropoda
- Subclass: Caenogastropoda
- Order: Neogastropoda
- Family: Harpidae
- Genus: Morum
- Species: M. teramachii

Binomial name
- Morum teramachii Kuroda & Habe, 1961

Synonyms
- Morum (Oniscidia) teramachii Kuroda & Habe, 1961 accepted, alternate representation

Species of gastropod

Morum teramachii is a species of sea snail, a marine gastropod mollusk in the family Harpidae, the harp snails.
