= M. grande =

M. grande may refer to:

- Memecylon grande, a plant species endemic to Sri Lanka
- Morum grande, a sea snail species

== See also ==
- Grande (disambiguation)
