= Morum berschaueri =

Scientific classification
- Kingdom: Animalia
- Phylum: Mollusca
- Class: Gastropoda
- Subclass: Caenogastropoda
- Order: Neogastropoda
- Superfamily: Muricoidea
- Family: Harpidae
- Subfamily: Moruminae
- Genus: Morum
- Species: M. berschaueri

Binomial name
- Morum berschaueri Petuch & R. F. Myers, 2015

Species of gastropod

Morum berschaueri is a species of sea snail, a marine gastropod mollusk, in the family Harpidae.

== Distribution ==
This species occurs in Brazil.
