= Morum exquisitum =

Scientific classification
- Kingdom: Animalia
- Phylum: Mollusca
- Class: Gastropoda
- Subclass: Caenogastropoda
- Order: Neogastropoda
- Family: Harpidae
- Genus: Morum
- Species: M. exquisitum

Binomial name
- Morum exquisitum (A. Adams & Reeve, 1848)

Species of gastropod

Morum exquisitum is a species of sea snail, a marine gastropod mollusk in the family Harpidae, the harp snails.
