= Morum watanabei =

Scientific classification
- Kingdom: Animalia
- Phylum: Mollusca
- Class: Gastropoda
- Subclass: Caenogastropoda
- Order: Neogastropoda
- Family: Harpidae
- Genus: Morum
- Species: M. watanabei

Binomial name
- Morum watanabei Kosuge, 1981

Species of gastropod

Morum watanabei is a species of sea snail, a marine gastropod mollusk in the family Harpidae, the harp snails.

== Description ==
Shell size 30 mm.

== Distribution ==
Philippines.
