= Austroharpa wilsoni =

Scientific classification
- Kingdom: Animalia
- Phylum: Mollusca
- Class: Gastropoda
- Subclass: Caenogastropoda
- Order: Neogastropoda
- Family: Harpidae
- Genus: Austroharpa
- Species: A. wilsoni

Binomial name
- Austroharpa wilsoni Rehder, 1973

Species of gastropod

Austroharpa wilsoni is a species of sea snail, a marine gastropod mollusk in the family Harpidae, the harp snails.
