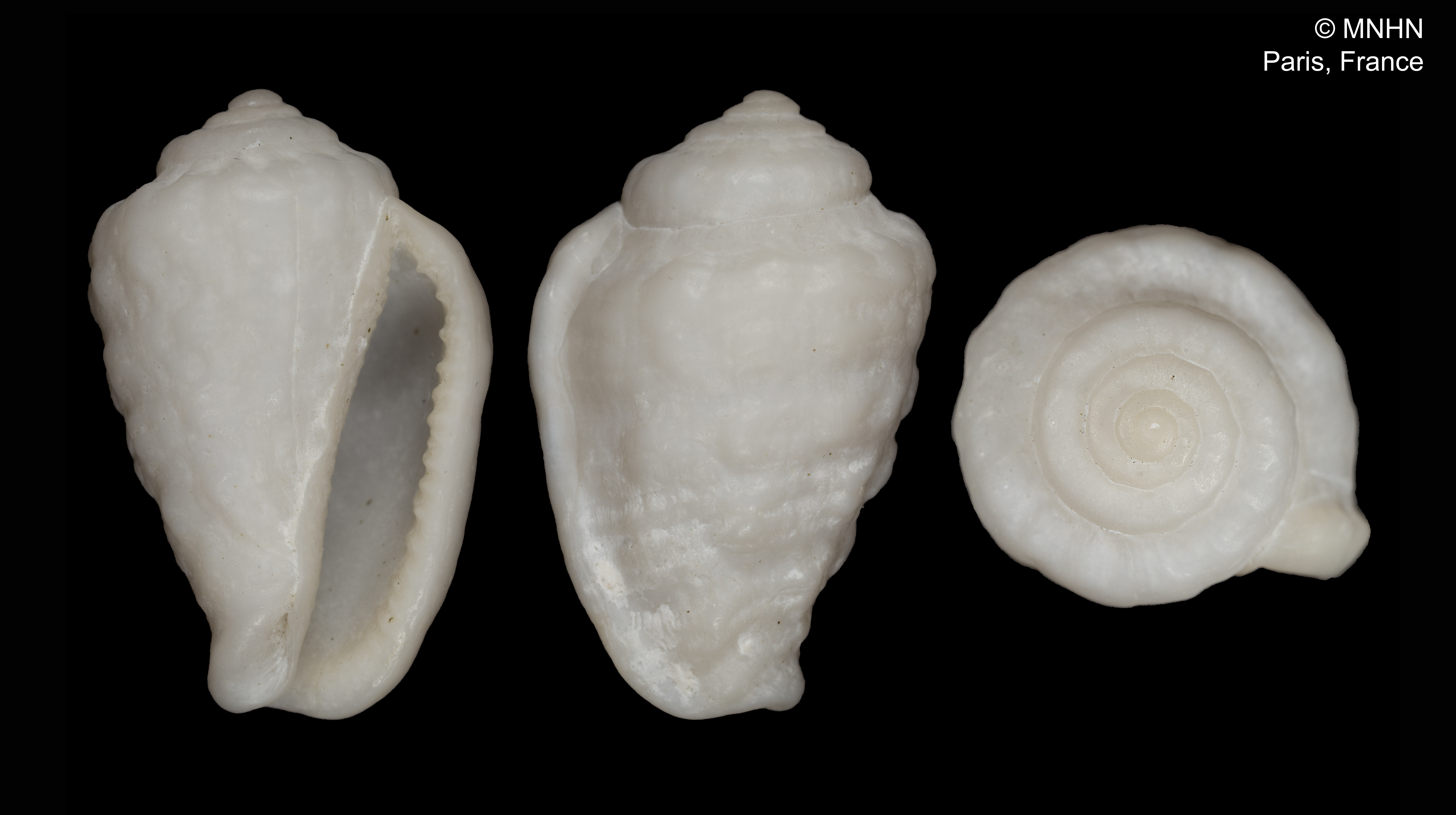
- Shell of Morum lorenzi (holotype at MNHN, Paris)

Scientific classification
- Kingdom: Animalia
- Phylum: Mollusca
- Class: Gastropoda
- Subclass: Caenogastropoda
- Order: Neogastropoda
- Superfamily: Muricoidea
- Family: Harpidae
- Subfamily: Moruminae
- Genus: Morum
- Species: M. lorenzi

Binomial name
- Morum lorenzi D. Monsecour, 2011

Synonyms
- Morum (Oniscidia) lorenzi D. Monsecour, 2011

= Morum lorenzi =

Species of gastropod

Morum lorenzi is a species of sea snail, a marine gastropod mollusk, in the family Harpidae.

== Description ==
The length of the shell attains 20.1 mm.

== Distribution ==
The holotype was found on the St. Brandon shoals, western Indian Ocean.
