= Austroharpa learorum =

Scientific classification
- Kingdom: Animalia
- Phylum: Mollusca
- Class: Gastropoda
- Subclass: Caenogastropoda
- Order: Neogastropoda
- Family: Harpidae
- Genus: Austroharpa
- Species: A. learorum

Binomial name
- Austroharpa learorum Hart & Limpus, 1998

Species of gastropod

Austroharpa learorum is a species of sea snail that belongs to the family Harpidae (harp snails).

== Distribution ==
The snails are largely found in Southern Australia, especially on the southerly coast of Western Australia.

== Description ==
This species has a large conch-shaped shell that has a cream colour and typically orange flecks.
