= Austroharpa exquisita =

Scientific classification
- Kingdom: Animalia
- Phylum: Mollusca
- Class: Gastropoda
- Subclass: Caenogastropoda
- Order: Neogastropoda
- Family: Harpidae
- Genus: Austroharpa
- Species: A. exquisita

Binomial name
- Austroharpa exquisita (Iredale, 1931)

Species of gastropod

Austroharpa exquisita is a species of sea snail, a marine gastropod mollusk in the family Harpidae, the harp snails.
