= Morum dennisoni =

Scientific classification
- Kingdom: Animalia
- Phylum: Mollusca
- Class: Gastropoda
- Subclass: Caenogastropoda
- Order: Neogastropoda
- Family: Harpidae
- Genus: Morum
- Species: M. dennisoni

Binomial name
- Morum dennisoni (Reeve, 1842)

Species of gastropod

Morum dennisoni, Dennison's morum, named after the nineteenth-century shell collector John Dennison, is a species of sea snail, a marine gastropod mollusk in the family Harpidae, the harp snails.

== Description ==
Specimens taken by shrimp trawlers along the continental shelf of Northern South America have rich red parietal plates whereas examples taken off the west coast of Barbados usually have orange parietal plates.

The species has a small vestigial operculum -and a very thin periostracum, and uses miosis to breed.

They are small mollusks, only reaching, on average, 45 mm long. There are outliers, however, that exceed 65 mm.

== Distribution ==
This species is sometimes trapped or dredged alive off the west coast of Barbados, at depths around 100–170 meters.

Dennison Morum's can be found anywhere as south as Brazil, in South America, to as far north as North Carolina in the United States.

This species has been becoming more rare as the years go on due to predation from shrimp trawling, meaning it is an unwanted bycatch of fishing.

== History ==
Shells of Dennison's Morum have been seen in the history books as early as the 1600s, selling at auctions for exorbitant amounts, referred to the "sale of the century".
