= Eocithara waihaoensis =

Scientific classification
- Kingdom: Animalia
- Phylum: Mollusca
- Class: Gastropoda
- Subclass: Caenogastropoda
- Order: Neogastropoda
- Superfamily: Muricoidea
- Family: Harpidae
- Genus: †Eocithara
- Species: †E. waihaoensis

Binomial name
- †Eocithara waihaoensis Laws, 1935

Synonyms
- † Eocithara (Marwickara) waihaoensis Laws, 1935

Extinct species of gastropod

Eocithara waihaoensis is an extinct species of sea snail, a marine gastropod mollusk, in the family Harpidae.
