= Morum jungi =

Scientific classification
- Kingdom: Animalia
- Phylum: Mollusca
- Class: Gastropoda
- Subclass: Caenogastropoda
- Order: Neogastropoda
- Superfamily: Muricoidea
- Family: Harpidae
- Subfamily: Moruminae
- Genus: Morum
- Species: †M. jungi

Binomial name
- †Morum jungi Landau, 1996

Synonyms
- † Morum (Oniscidia) jungi Landau, 1996

Extinct species of gastropod

Morum jungi is an extinct species of sea snail, a marine gastropod mollusk, in the family Harpidae.
