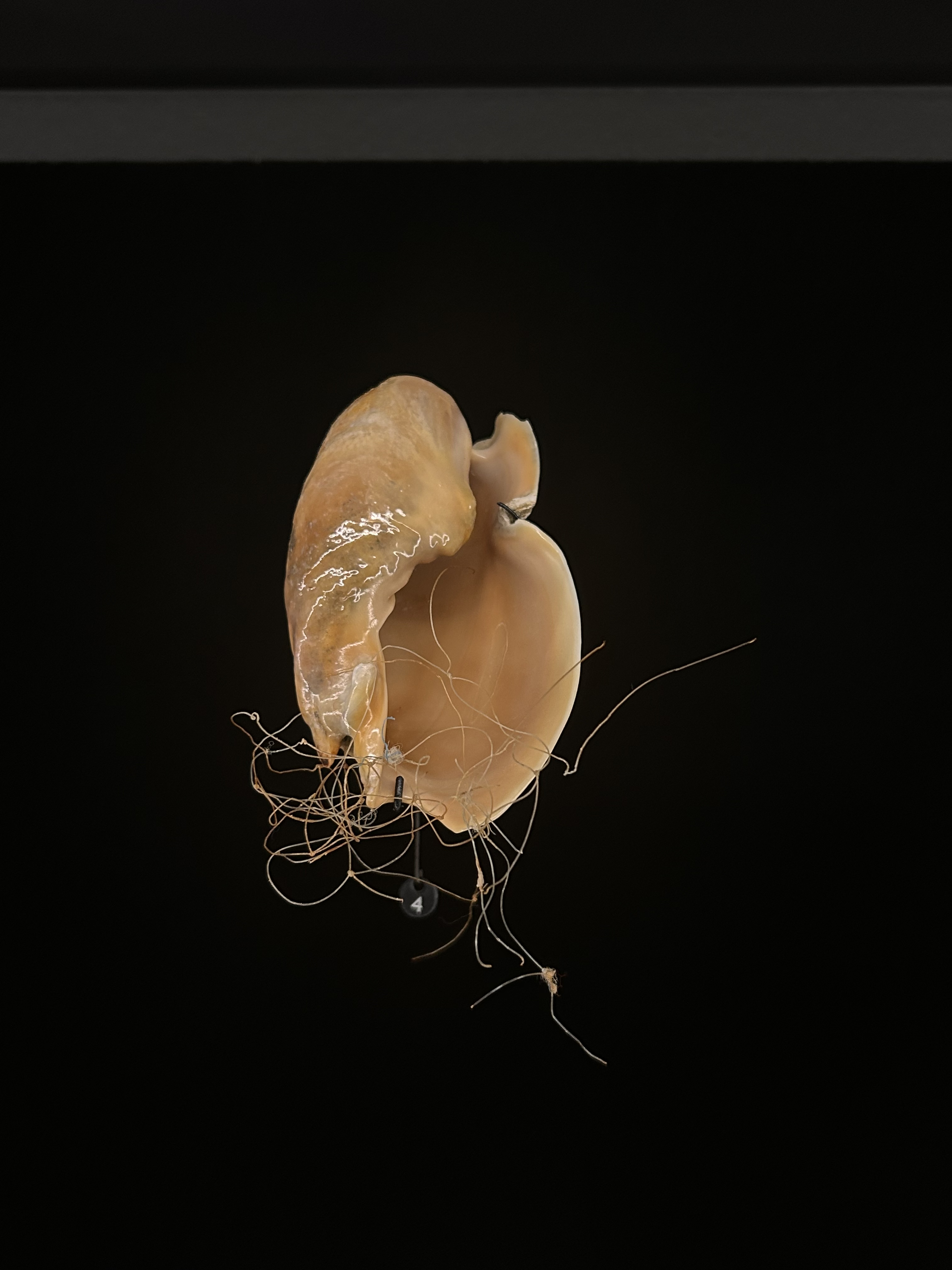
- Austroharpa punctata in the Houston Museum of Natural Science

Scientific classification
- Kingdom: Animalia
- Phylum: Mollusca
- Class: Gastropoda
- Subclass: Caenogastropoda
- Order: Neogastropoda
- Family: Harpidae
- Genus: Austroharpa
- Species: A. punctata

Binomial name
- Austroharpa punctata (Verco, 1896)

= Austroharpa punctata =

Species of gastropod

Austroharpa punctata is a species of sea snail, a marine gastropod mollusk in the family Harpidae, the harp snails.
