= Morum lindae =

Scientific classification
- Kingdom: Animalia
- Phylum: Mollusca
- Class: Gastropoda
- Subclass: Caenogastropoda
- Order: Neogastropoda
- Family: Harpidae
- Genus: Morum
- Species: M. lindae

Binomial name
- Morum lindae Petuch, 1987

Species of gastropod

Morum lindae is a species of sea snail, a marine gastropod mollusk in the family Harpidae, the harp snails.

== Description ==
Original description: "Shell stocky, rotund, inflated, lightweight; spire low, but early whorls exserted; shoulder angle sharp; 16 serrated, bladelike axial ribs on body whorl; axial ribs intersected by 7 large spiral cords, with large, pointed serration at each intersection, giving shell squamose appearance; serrations along shoulder cord largest, producing coronated effect; outer lip thickened; inner edge of lip with 16 large denticles and smaller secondary denticles in between; parietal shield well-developed, wide, covered with numerous small pustules; shell base color pinkish-white with scattered patches of bright pink; pinkish-white base color overlaid with 2 wide, reddish-brown spiral bands; spire with intermittent large reddish-brown patches; parietal shield salmon-pink with lavender border and white pustules; side of lip white, with numerous bands of tiny brown dots; edge of lip salmon-pink with 13 lavender-purple radiating bars; denticles of lip salmon-pink; interior of aperture white; protoconch and early whorls white."

== Distribution ==
Typical location: "Offshore Cabo La Vela, Goajira Peninsula, Colombia, South America."
