= Morum fatimae =

Scientific classification
- Kingdom: Animalia
- Phylum: Mollusca
- Class: Gastropoda
- Subclass: Caenogastropoda
- Order: Neogastropoda
- Family: Harpidae
- Genus: Morum
- Species: M. fatimae

Binomial name
- Morum fatimae Poppe & Brulet, 1999

Species of gastropod

Morum fatimae is a species of sea snail, a marine gastropod mollusk in the family Harpidae, the harp snails.

== Distribution ==
It is found in the Mozambique Channel.
