= Morum ponderosum =

Scientific classification
- Kingdom: Animalia
- Phylum: Mollusca
- Class: Gastropoda
- Subclass: Caenogastropoda
- Order: Neogastropoda
- Family: Harpidae
- Genus: Morum
- Species: M. ponderosum

Binomial name
- Morum ponderosum (Hanley, 1858)

Species of gastropod

Morum ponderosum is a species of sea snail, a marine gastropod mollusk in the family Harpidae, the harp snails.

== Distribution ==
Southwestern Pacific, on reefs.
