= Austroharpa tatei =

Scientific classification
- Kingdom: Animalia
- Phylum: Mollusca
- Class: Gastropoda
- Subclass: Caenogastropoda
- Order: Neogastropoda
- Family: Harpidae
- Genus: Austroharpa
- Species: †A. tatei

Binomial name
- †Austroharpa tatei Finlay, 1931

Extinct species of gastropod

Austroharpa tatei is an extinct species of sea snail, a marine gastropod mollusk, in the family Harpidae.

== Distribution ==
This species occurs in Australian Exclusive Economic Zone.
