= Morum bruuni =

Scientific classification
- Kingdom: Animalia
- Phylum: Mollusca
- Class: Gastropoda
- Subclass: Caenogastropoda
- Order: Neogastropoda
- Family: Harpidae
- Genus: Morum
- Species: M. bruuni

Binomial name
- Morum bruuni (Powell, 1979)

Synonyms
- Morum delectum (Garrard, 1961); Pulchroniscia delecta Garrard, 1961

Species of gastropod

Morum bruuni is a species of sea snail, a marine gastropod mollusk in the family Harpidae, the harp snails.

== Distribution ==
This marine species is endemic to New Zealand.
