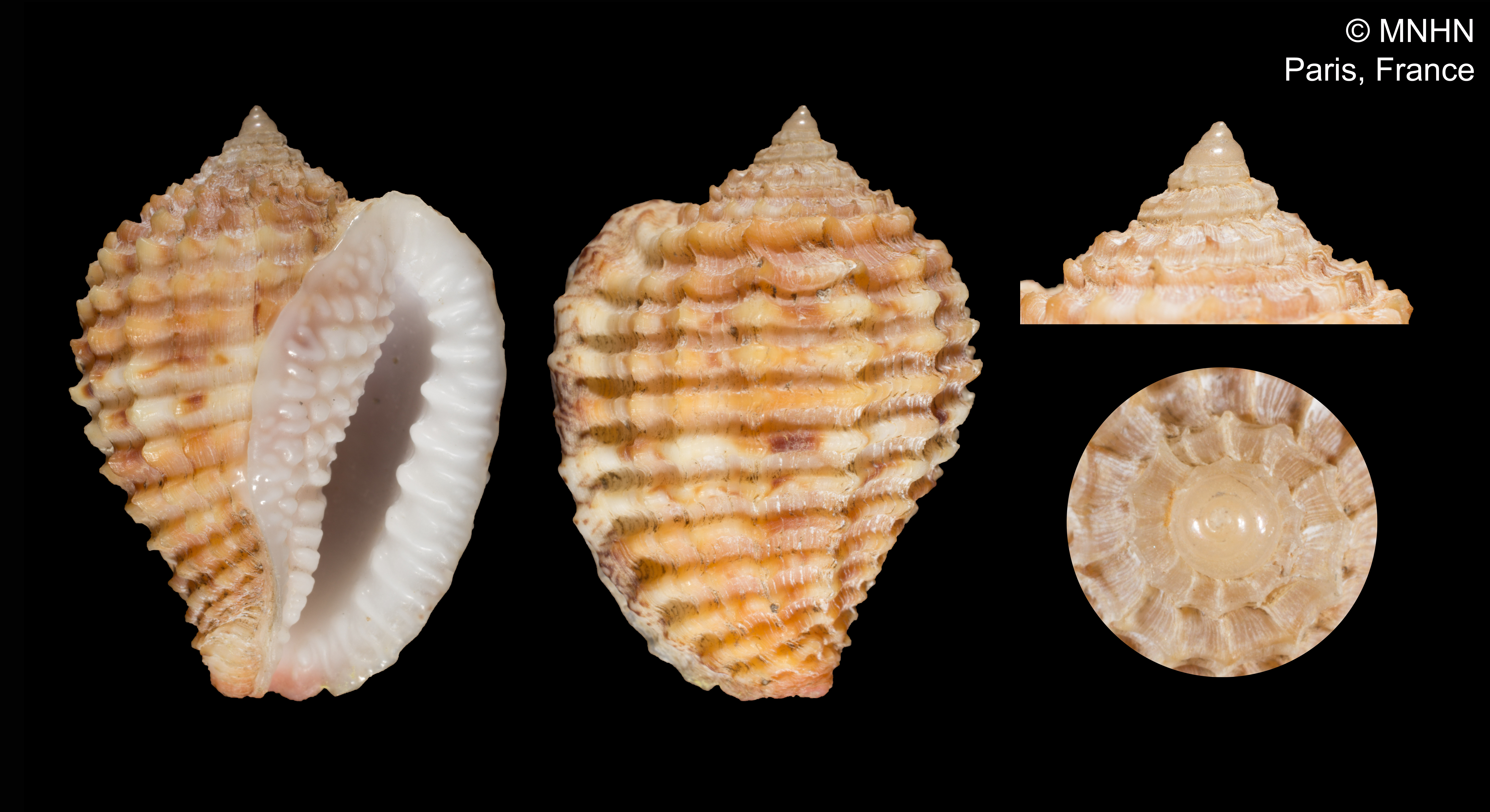
- Shell of Morum roseum (holotype at MNHN, Paris)

Scientific classification
- Kingdom: Animalia
- Phylum: Mollusca
- Class: Gastropoda
- Subclass: Caenogastropoda
- Order: Neogastropoda
- Family: Harpidae
- Genus: Morum
- Species: M. roseum

Binomial name
- Morum roseum Bouchet, 2002

= Morum roseum =

Species of gastropod

Morum roseum is a species of sea snail, a marine gastropod mollusk in the family Harpidae, the harp snails.

== Description ==
The length of the shell attains 21.5 mm.

== Distribution ==
This marine species occurs off the Marquesas Islands.
