= Morum purpureum =

Scientific classification
- Kingdom: Animalia
- Phylum: Mollusca
- Class: Gastropoda
- Subclass: Caenogastropoda
- Order: Neogastropoda
- Family: Harpidae
- Genus: Morum
- Species: M. purpureum

Binomial name
- Morum purpureum Röding, 1798

Synonyms
- Morum lamarcki (Deshayes, 1844) (misspelling); Morum lamarckii (Deshayes, 1844)

Species of gastropod

Morum purpureum is a species of sea snail, a marine gastropod mollusk in the family Harpidae, the harp snails.

== Distribution ==
This species occurs in the Caribbean Sea off Belize.
