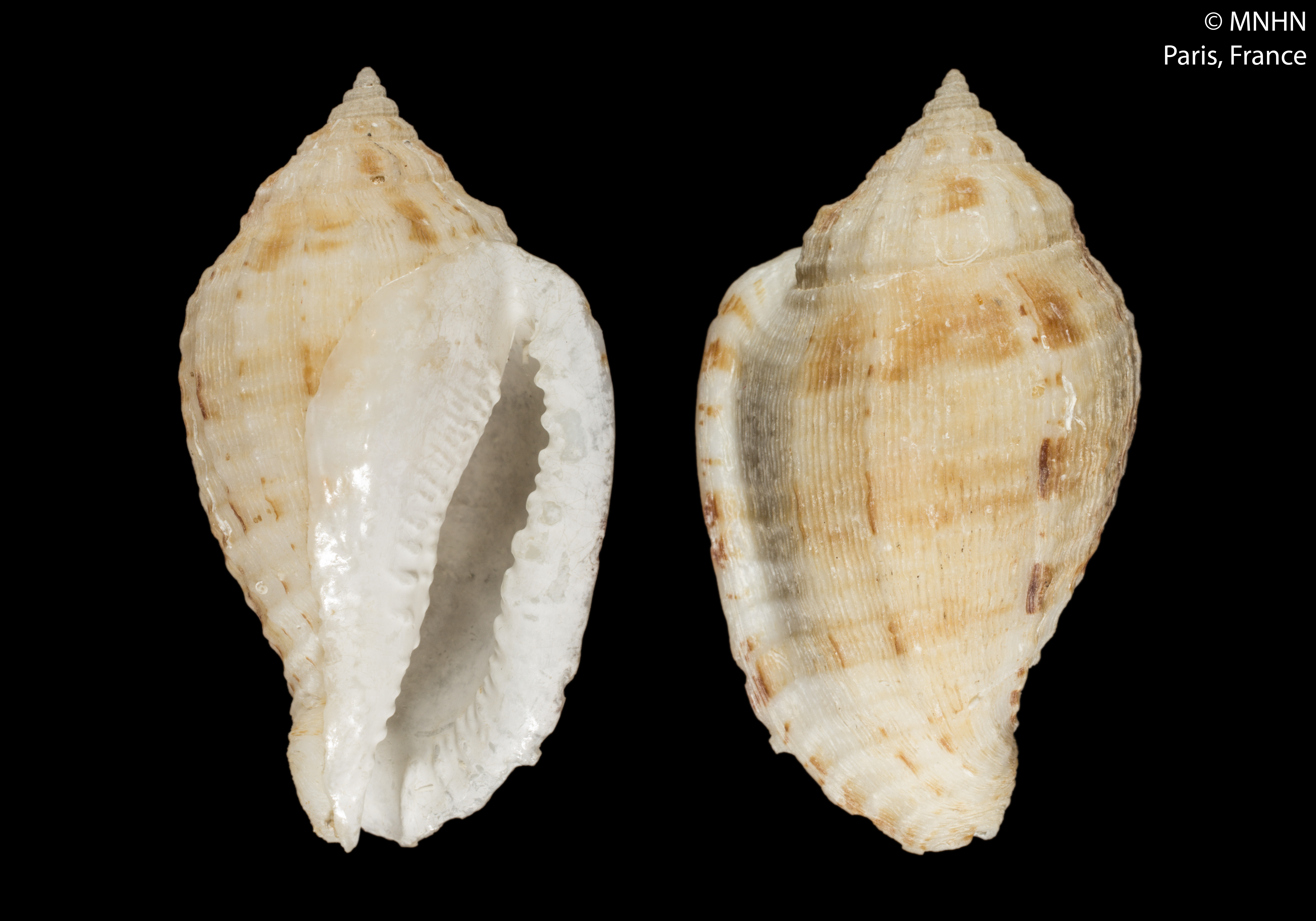
- Shell of Morum inerme (holotype at MNHN, Paris)

Scientific classification
- Kingdom: Animalia
- Phylum: Mollusca
- Class: Gastropoda
- Subclass: Caenogastropoda
- Order: Neogastropoda
- Superfamily: Muricoidea
- Family: Harpidae
- Subfamily: Moruminae
- Genus: Morum
- Species: M. inerme

Binomial name
- Morum inerme Lorenz, 2014

Synonyms
- Morum (Oniscidia) inerme Lorenz, 2014

= Morum inerme =

Species of gastropod

Morum inerme is a species of sea snail, a marine gastropod mollusk, in the family Harpidae.

== Description ==
The length of the shell attains 45.3 mm.

== Distribution ==
The holotype of this species was found on the Nazareth Bank, western Indian Ocean.
