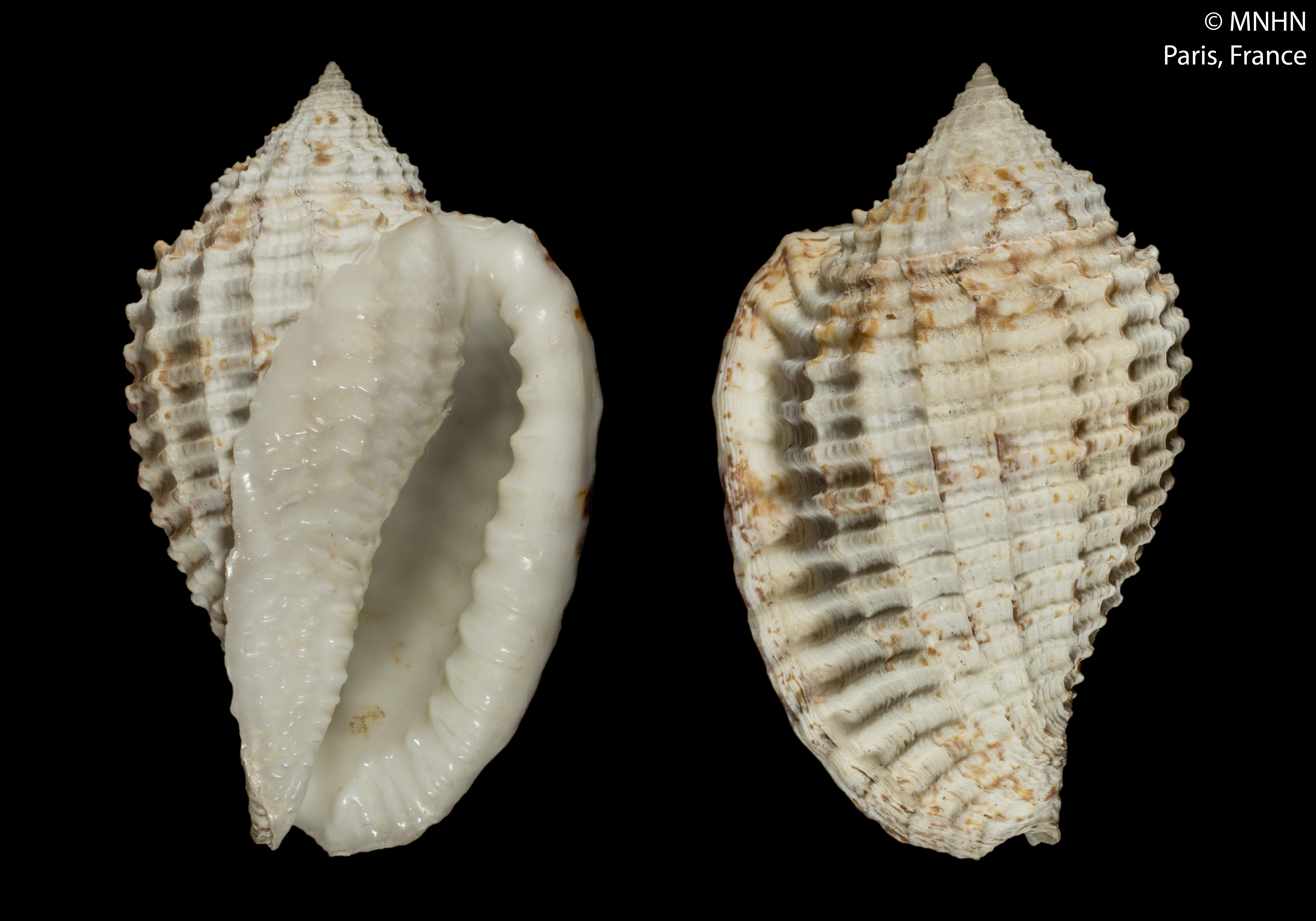
- Shell of Morum petestimpsoni (holotype at MNHN, Paris)

Scientific classification
- Kingdom: Animalia
- Phylum: Mollusca
- Class: Gastropoda
- Subclass: Caenogastropoda
- Order: Neogastropoda
- Superfamily: Muricoidea
- Family: Harpidae
- Subfamily: Moruminae
- Genus: Morum
- Species: M. petestimpsoni

Binomial name
- Morum petestimpsoni Thach, 2017

= Morum petestimpsoni =

Species of gastropod

Morum petestimpsoni is a species of sea snail, a marine gastropod mollusk, in the family Harpidae.

== Description ==
The length of the shell attains 61.2 mm.

== Distribution ==
This species occurs in Vietnam.
