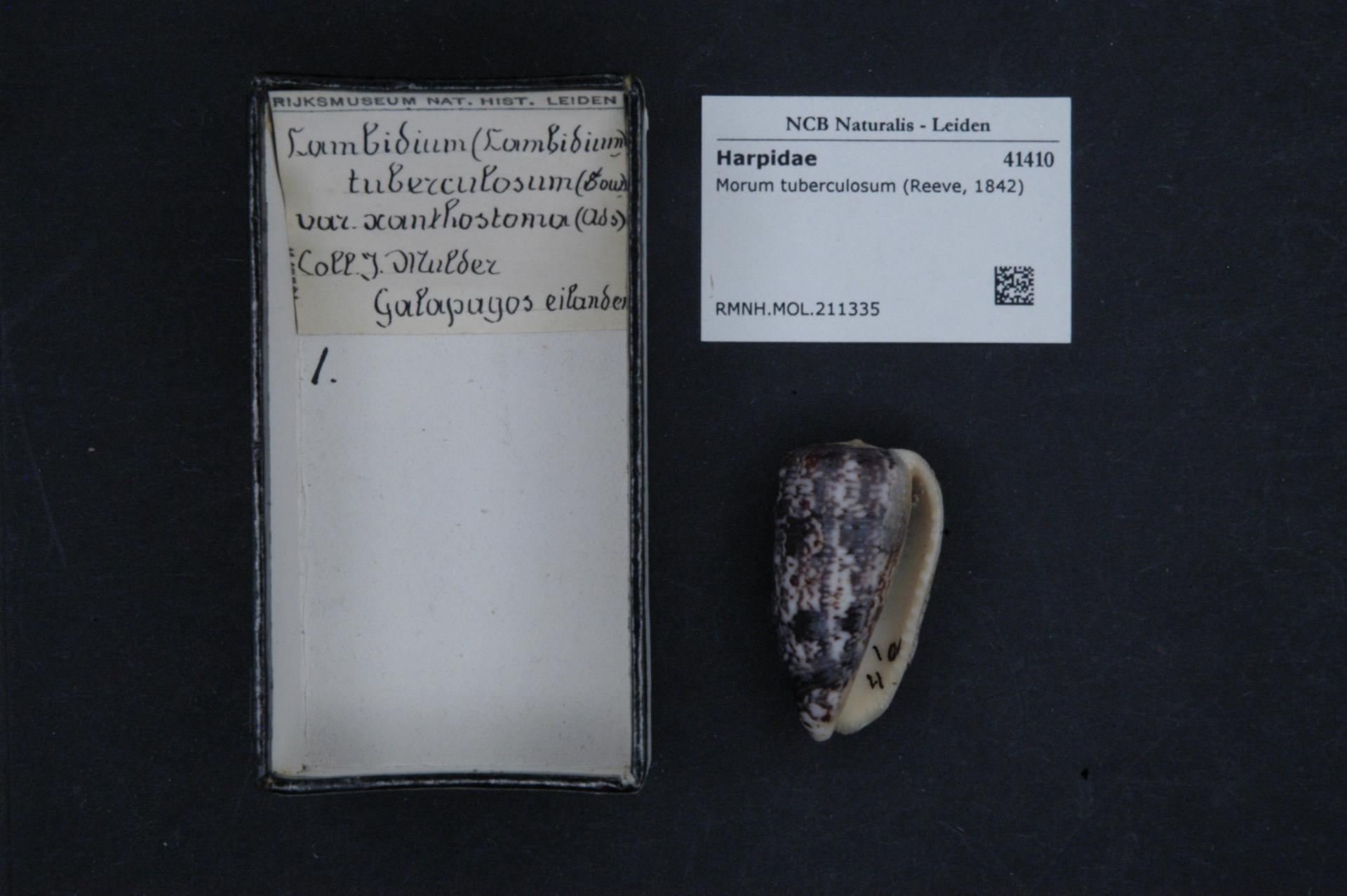
- Preserved specimen

Scientific classification
- Kingdom: Animalia
- Phylum: Mollusca
- Class: Gastropoda
- Subclass: Caenogastropoda
- Order: Neogastropoda
- Family: Harpidae
- Genus: Morum
- Species: M. tuberculosum

Binomial name
- Morum tuberculosum (Reeve, 1842)

= Morum tuberculosum =

Species of gastropod

Morum tuberculosum is a species of sea snail, a marine gastropod mollusk in the family Harpidae, the harp snails.

== Distribution ==
Shallow water, Baja California to Peru.
