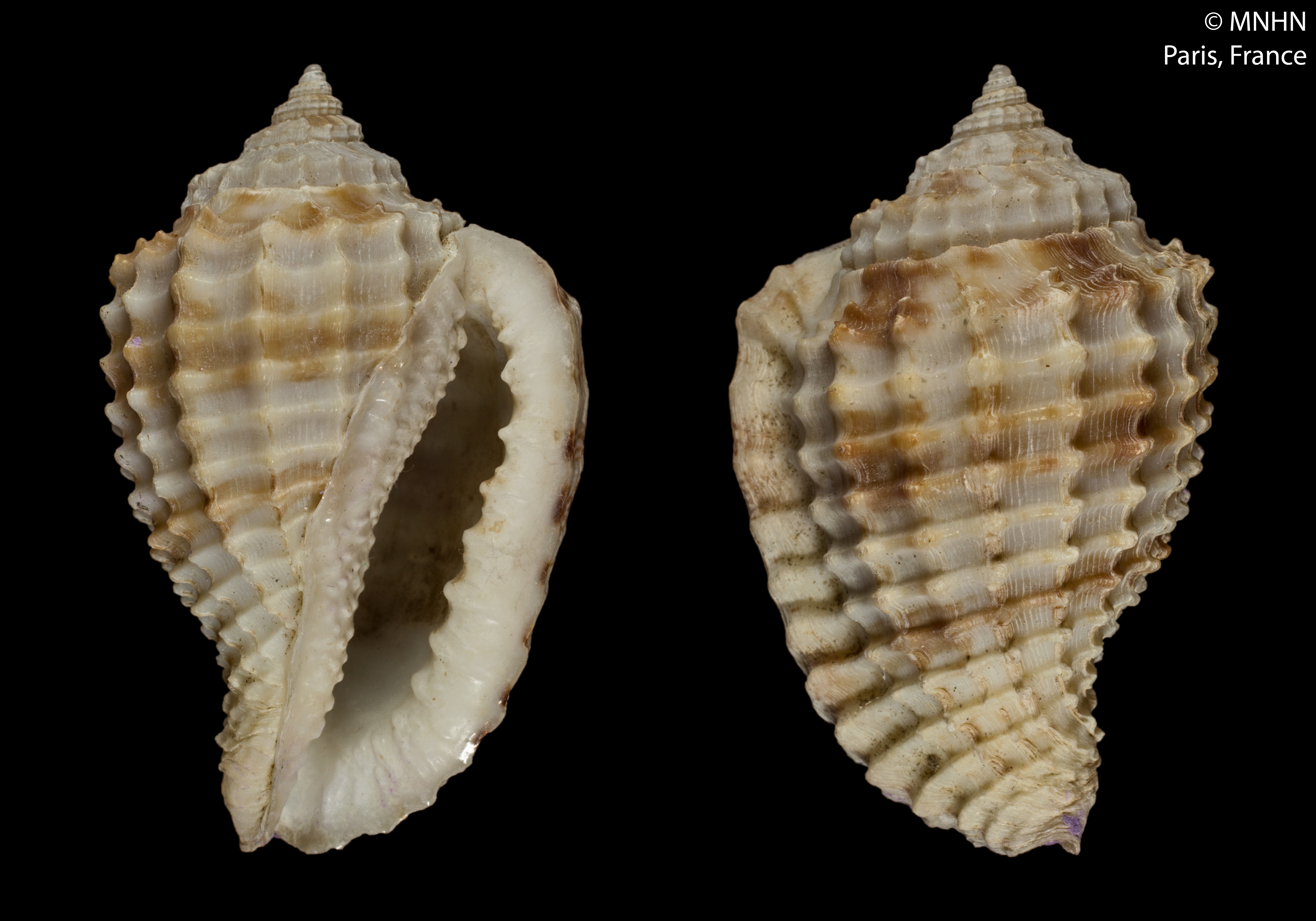
- Shell of Morum alfi (holotype at MNHN, Paris)

Scientific classification
- Kingdom: Animalia
- Phylum: Mollusca
- Class: Gastropoda
- Subclass: Caenogastropoda
- Order: Neogastropoda
- Superfamily: Muricoidea
- Family: Harpidae
- Subfamily: Moruminae
- Genus: Morum
- Species: M. alfi

Binomial name
- Morum alfi Thach, 2018

= Morum alfi =

Species of gastropod

Morum alfi is a species of sea snail, a marine gastropod mollusk, in the family Harpidae.

== Description ==
The length of the shell attains 44.1 mm.

== Distribution ==
This species occurs in Vietnamese Exclusive Economic Zone.
