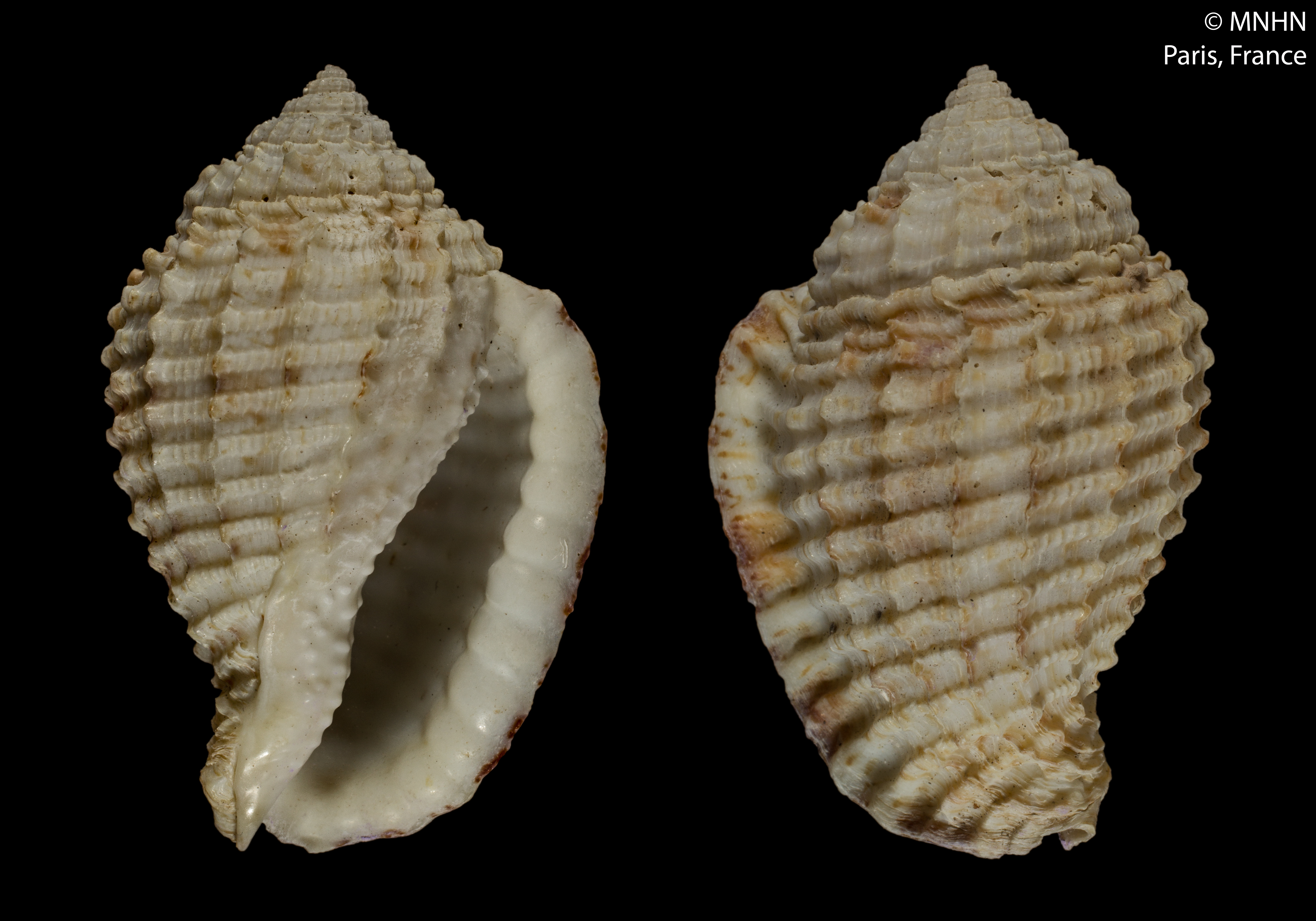
- Shell of Morum kreipli (holotype at MNHN, Paris)

Scientific classification
- Kingdom: Animalia
- Phylum: Mollusca
- Class: Gastropoda
- Subclass: Caenogastropoda
- Order: Neogastropoda
- Superfamily: Muricoidea
- Family: Harpidae
- Subfamily: Moruminae
- Genus: Morum
- Species: M. kreipli

Binomial name
- Morum kreipli Thach, 2018

= Morum kreipli =

Species of gastropod

Morum kreipli is a species of sea snail, a marine gastropod mollusk, in the family Harpidae.

== Description ==
The length of the shell attains 53.8 mm.

== Distribution ==
This species occurs in Vietnamese Exclusive Economic Zone.
