= Morum bayeri =

Scientific classification
- Kingdom: Animalia
- Phylum: Mollusca
- Class: Gastropoda
- Subclass: Caenogastropoda
- Order: Neogastropoda
- Family: Harpidae
- Genus: Morum
- Species: M. bayeri

Binomial name
- Morum bayeri Petuch, 2001

Species of gastropod

Morum bayeri is a species of sea snail, a marine gastropod mollusk in the family Harpidae, the harp snails.
