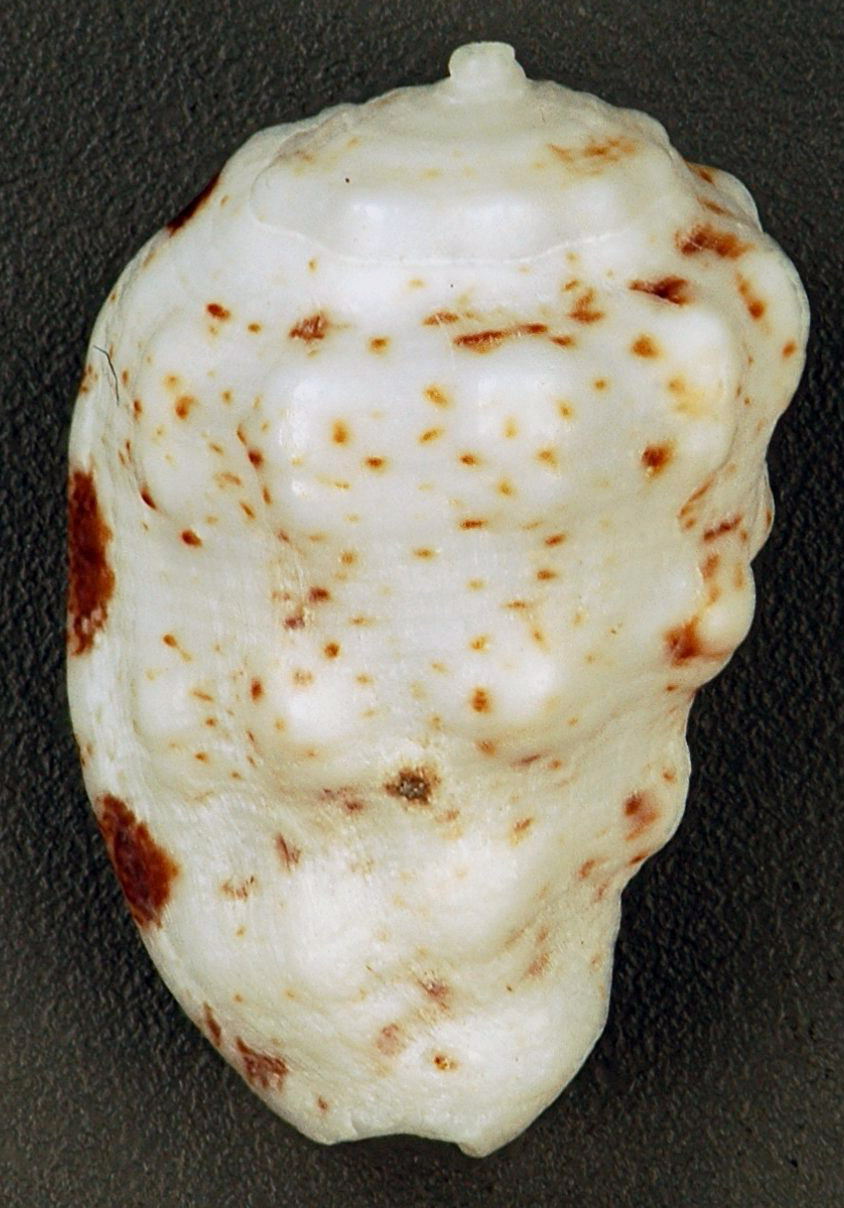
- Morum oniscus shell

Scientific classification
- Kingdom: Animalia
- Phylum: Mollusca
- Class: Gastropoda
- Subclass: Caenogastropoda
- Order: Neogastropoda
- Family: Harpidae
- Genus: Morum
- Species: M. oniscus

Binomial name
- Morum oniscus (Linnaeus, 1767)

Synonyms
- Cypraea conoidea Scopoli, 1786; Oniscia quadriseriata Menke, 1830; Oniscia triseriata Menke, 1830 (unnecessary substitute name for Strombus oniscus); Strombus oniscus Linnaeus, 1767 (original combination)

= Morum oniscus =

Species of gastropod

Morum oniscus is a species of sea snail, a marine gastropod mollusk in the family Harpidae, the harp snails.

== Distribution ==
This species occurs from Bermuda to southeastern Florida (Palm Beach County) and the Florida Keys; throughout the Bahamas and the entire Caribbean Sea Basin; south to the Lesser Antilles and Barbados (rare at Barbados). The species is absent from the Gulf of Mexico.

== Description ==
Shell size 15-32 mm.
