= Austroharpa loisae =

Scientific classification
- Kingdom: Animalia
- Phylum: Mollusca
- Class: Gastropoda
- Subclass: Caenogastropoda
- Order: Neogastropoda
- Family: Harpidae
- Genus: Austroharpa
- Species: A. loisae

Binomial name
- Austroharpa loisae Rehder, 1973

Species of gastropod

Austroharpa loisae is a species of sea snail, a marine gastropod mollusk in the family Harpidae, the harp snails.
