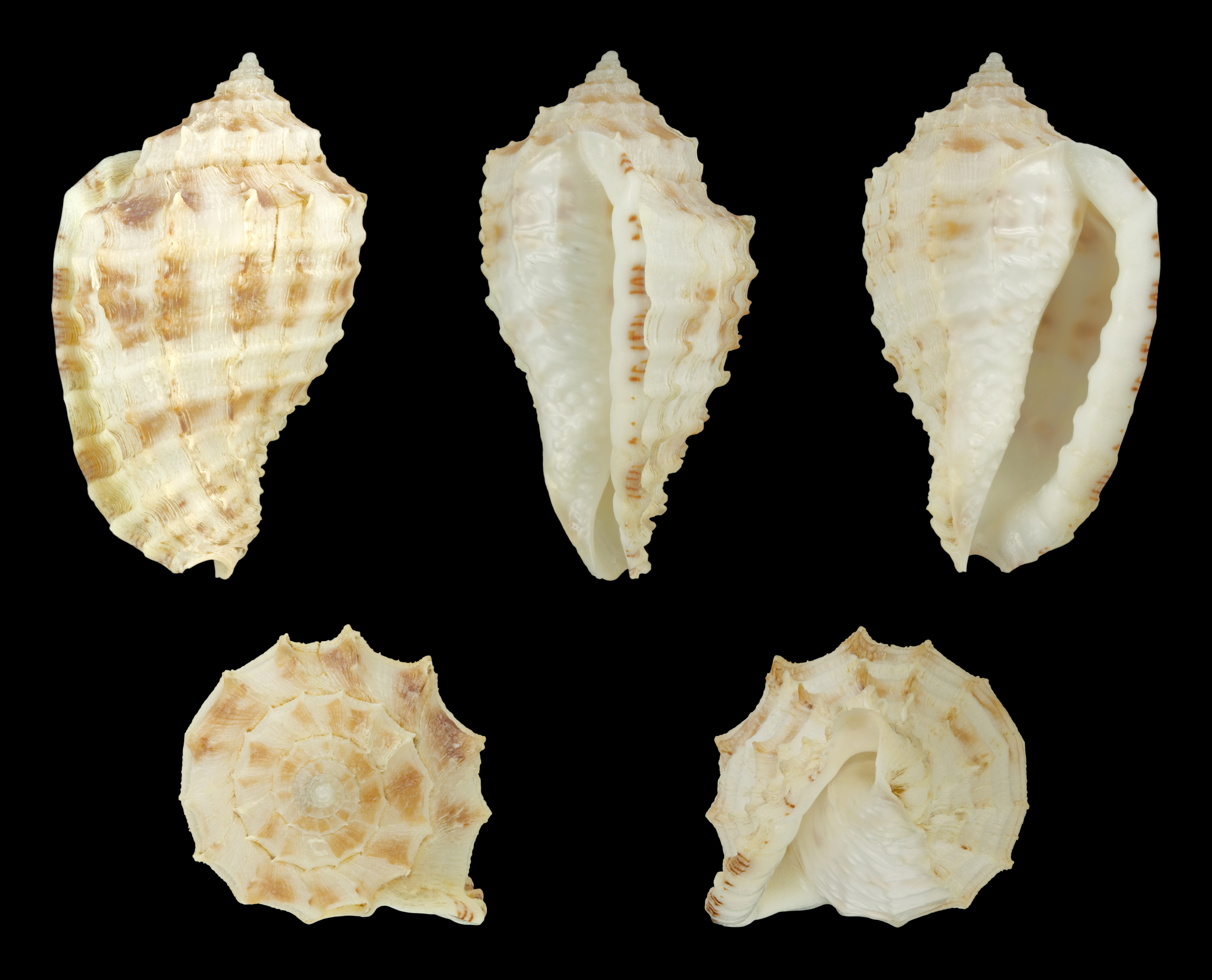

Scientific classification
- Kingdom: Animalia
- Phylum: Mollusca
- Class: Gastropoda
- Subclass: Caenogastropoda
- Order: Neogastropoda
- Family: Harpidae
- Genus: Morum
- Species: M. cancellatum

Binomial name
- Morum cancellatum (G.B. Sowerby I, 1824)

Synonyms
- Morum (Oniscidia) cancellatum (G. B. Sowerby I, 1825) accepted, alternate representation

= Morum cancellatum =

Species of gastropod

Morum cancellatum is a species of sea snail, a marine gastropod mollusk in the family Harpidae, the harp snails.
