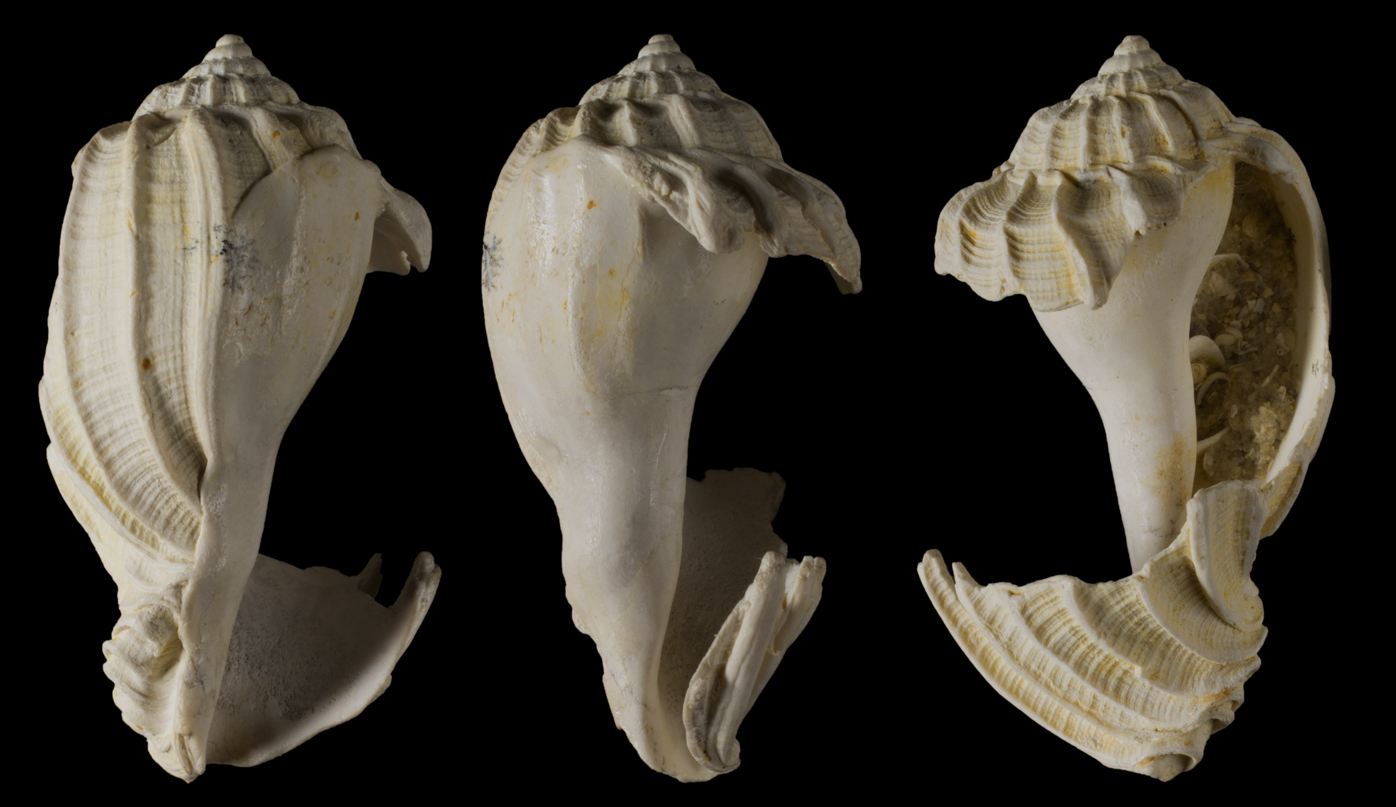
- Shell of Eocithara elegans (specimen at MNHN, Paris)

Scientific classification
- Kingdom: Animalia
- Phylum: Mollusca
- Class: Gastropoda
- Subclass: Caenogastropoda
- Order: Neogastropoda
- Superfamily: Muricoidea
- Family: Harpidae
- Genus: †Eocithara; P. Fischer, 1883

Synonyms
- † Eocithara (Eocithara) P. Fischer, 1883 · accepted, alternate representation; †Eocithara (Marwickara) Laws, 1935; † Eocithara (Refluharpa) Rehder, 1973; † Harpa (Eocithara) P. Fischer, 1883 (original rank); † Refluharpa Iredale, 1931 (unavailable name: no description)

= Eocithara =

Extinct genus of gastropods

Eocithara is an extinct genus of sea snails, marine gastropod mollusks, in the family Harpidae.

== Species ==
Species within the genus Eocithara include:

- † Eocithara elegans (Deshayes, 1835)
- † Eocithara eucosmia Merle & Pacaud, 2004
- † Eocithara helenae Merle & Pacaud, 2004
- † Eocithara jacksonensis (G. D. Harris, 1896)
- † Eocithara lamellifera (Tate, 1889)
- † Eocithara mutica (Lamarck, 1803)
- † Eocithara rosenkrantzi Merle & Pacaud, 2004
- † Eocithara submutica (d'Orbigny, 1852)
- † Eocithara waihaoensis Laws, 1935
