= Morum grande =

Scientific classification
- Kingdom: Animalia
- Phylum: Mollusca
- Class: Gastropoda
- Subclass: Caenogastropoda
- Order: Neogastropoda
- Family: Harpidae
- Genus: Morum
- Species: M. grande

Binomial name
- Morum grande (A. Adams, 1855)

Species of gastropod

Morum grande is a species of sea snail, a marine gastropod mollusk in the family Harpidae, the harp snails.

== Distribution ==
The snail lives near the Philippines in the Benthic zone.
