= Austroharpa =

Scientific classification
- Kingdom: Animalia
- Phylum: Mollusca
- Class: Gastropoda
- Subclass: Caenogastropoda
- Order: Neogastropoda
- Family: Harpidae
- Subfamily: Harpinae
- Genus: Austroharpa; Finlay, 1931

Genus of gastropods

Austroharpa is a genus of sea snails, marine gastropod mollusks in the family Harpidae.

== Species ==
Species within the genus Austroharpa include:

- Austroharpa exquisita (Iredale, 1931)
- Austroharpa learorum Hart & Limpus, 1998
- Austroharpa loisae Rehder, 1973
- †Austroharpa pulligera (Tate, 1889)
- Austroharpa punctata (Verco, 1896)
- †Austroharpa tatei Finlay, 1931
- Austroharpa wilsoni Rehder, 1973
