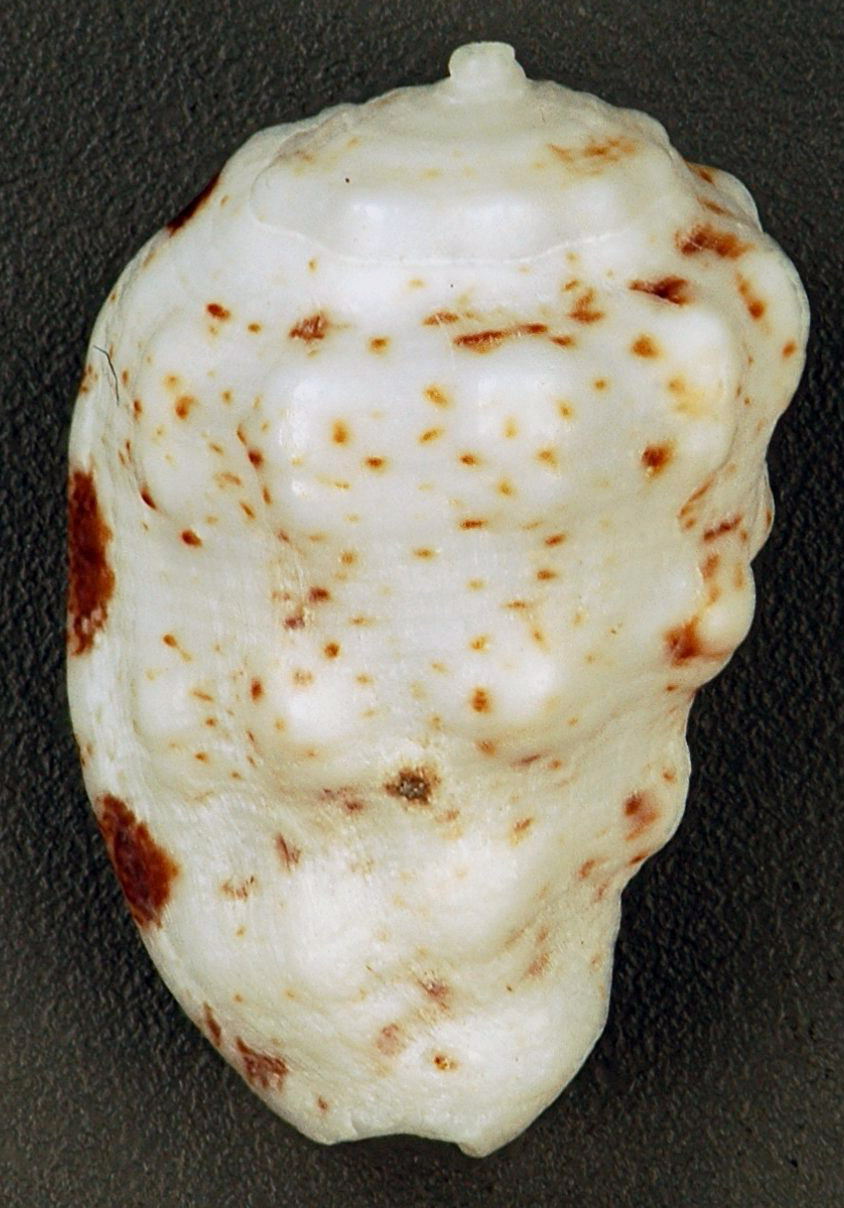
- Morum oniscus shell

Scientific classification
- Kingdom: Animalia
- Phylum: Mollusca
- Class: Gastropoda
- Subclass: Caenogastropoda
- Order: Neogastropoda
- Superfamily: Muricoidea
- Family: Harpidae
- Subfamily: Moruminae
- Genus: Morum; Röding, 1798

Synonyms
- Cancellomorum Emerson & Old, 1963; Herculea H. Adams & A. Adams, 1858; Lambidium Link, 1807; Morum (Herculea) H. Adams & A. Adams, 1858; Morum (Morum) Röding, 1798; Morum (Oniscidia) Mörch, 1852; Onimusiro Kuroda, Habe & Oyama, 1971; Oniscia G. B. Sowerby I, 1825; Oniscidia Mörch, 1852; Pulchroniscia Garrard, 1961

= Morum =

Genus of gastropods

Morum is a genus of sea snails, marine gastropod mollusks in the subfamily Moruminae of the family Harpidae.

== Species ==
Species within the genus Morum include:

- Morum alfi Thach, 2018
- Morum amabile Shikama, 1973
- Morum bayeri Petuch, 2001
- Morum berschaueri Petuch & R. F. Myers, 2015
- Morum bruuni (Powell, 1979)
- Morum cancellatum (G.B. Sowerby I, 1824)
- Morum clatratum Bouchet, 2002
- Morum concilium D. Monsecour, K. Monsecour & Lorenz, 2018
- Morum damasoi Petuch & Berschauer, 2020
- Morum dennisoni (Reeve, 1842)
- Morum exquisitum (A. Adams & Reeve, 1848)
- Morum fatimae Poppe & Brulet, 1999
- † Morum finlayi (Laws, 1932)
- Morum grande (A. Adams, 1855)
- † Morum harpaforme Powell & Bartrum, 1929
- Morum inerme Lorenz, 2014
- Morum janae D. Monsecour & Lorenz, 2011
- Morum joelgreenei Emerson, 1981
- † Morum jungi Landau, 1996
- Morum kreipli Thach, 2018
- Morum kurzi Petuch, 1979
- Morum lathraeum D. Monsecour, Lorenz & K. Monsecour, 2019
- Morum lindae Petuch, 1987
- Morum lorenzi D. Monsecour, 2011
- Morum macandrewi (G.B. Sowerby III, 1889)
- Morum macdonaldi Emerson, 1981
- Morum mariaodeteae Petuch & Berschauer, 2020
- Morum matthewsi Emerson, 1967
- Morum morrisoni D. Monsecour, Lorenz & K. Monsecour, 2020
- Morum ninomiyai Emerson, 1986
- Morum oniscus (Linnaeus, 1767)
- Morum petestimpsoni Thach, 2017
- Morum ponderosum (Hanley, 1858)
- Morum praeclarum Melvill, 1919
- Morum purpureum Röding, 1798
- Morum roseum Bouchet, 2002
- Morum strombiforme (Reeve, 1842)
- Morum teramachii Kuroda & Habe, 1961
- Morum tuberculosum (Reeve, 1842)
- Morum uchiyamai Kuroda & Habe, 1961
- Morum veleroae Emerson, 1968
- Morum vicdani Emerson, 1995
- Morum watanabei Kosuge, 1981
- Morum watsoni Dance & Emerson, 1967

Species brought into synonymy

- Morum celinamarumai Kosuge, 1981: synonym of Morum joelgreenei Emerson, 1981
- Morum delectum Garrard, 1961: synonym of Morum bruuni (Powell, 1979)
- Morum lamarcki (Deshayes, 1844): synonym of Morum purpureum Röding, 1798
- Morum lamarckii (Deshayes, 1844): synonym of Morum purpureum Röding, 1798
