= William Keith Emerson =

William K. Emerson
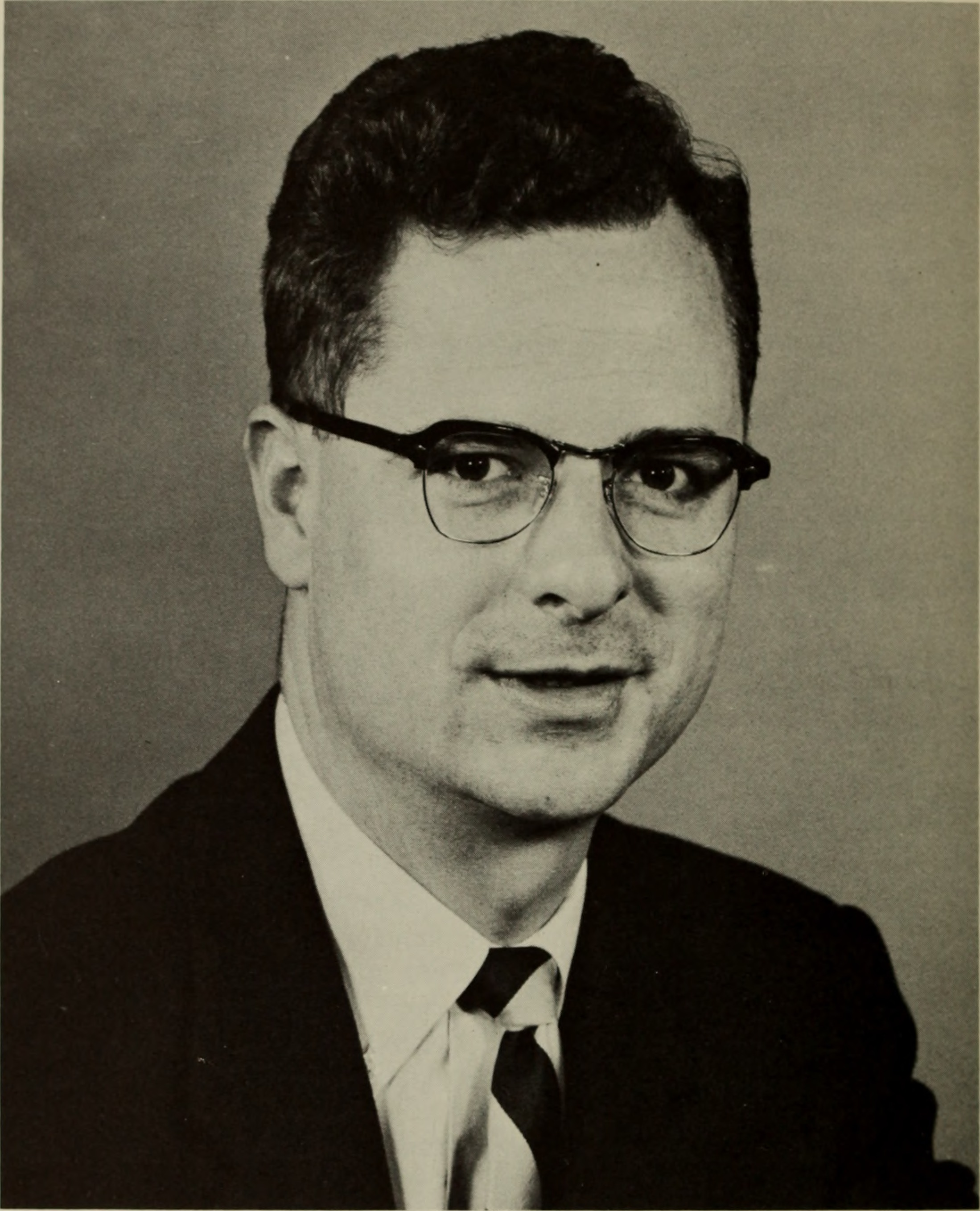
- Born: May 1, 1925; San Diego, California, US
- Died: October 19, 2016 (aged 91); New York City, US
- Education: University of California (Berkeley)
- Scientific career
- Fields: Malacology, Paleontology
- Workplaces: American Museum of Natural History

William Keith Emerson (May 1, 1925 – October 19, 2016), usually known as Bill Emerson, was an American malacologist, a biologist who studied mollusks. He was a Curator Emeritus at the American Museum of Natural History in New York City where he had been a curator since 1955. He was also Chairman of the Department of Living Invertebrates and head of the Malacology section for several decades.

== Books ==
Emerson has written numerous scientific publications and several popular shell books including:

- The American Museum of Natural History Guide to Shells: Land, Freshwater, and Marine from Nova Scotia to Florida by William K. Emerson and Morris K. Jacobson, 1976, Alfred A. Knopf
- Shells by William K. Emerson, Andreas Feininger, Hardcover, Thames and Hudson, ISBN 0-500-54008-X (0-500-54008-X)
- Shells from Cape Cod to Cape May: With Special Reference to the New York City Area by Morris K. Jacobson, William K. Emerson, Softcover, Dover Pubns, ISBN 0-486-25419-4 (0-486-25419-4)
- Wonders of Barnacles by William K. Emerson, Arnold Ross, Hardcover, Dodd, Mead, ISBN 0-396-06971-1 (0-396-06971-1)
- Wonders of the World of Shells: Sea, Land, and Fresh-Water by Morris K. Jacobson, William K. Emerson, Hardcover, Dodd, Mead, ISBN 0-396-06326-8 (0-396-06326-8)
