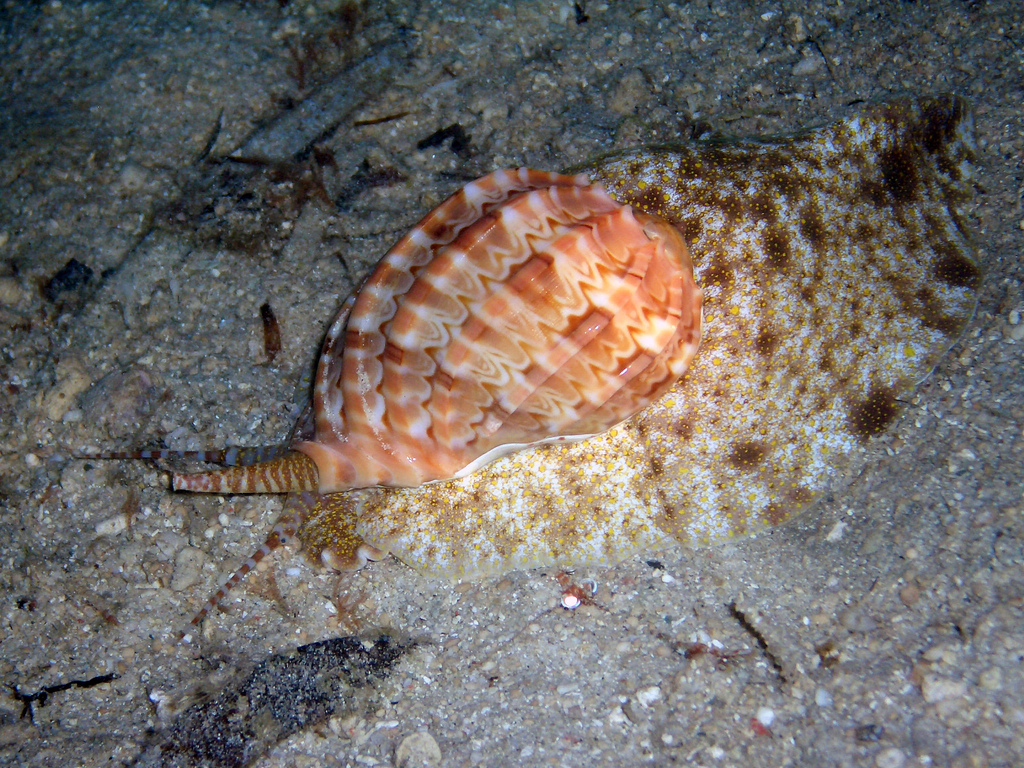
- A live individual of Harpa major

Scientific classification
- Kingdom: Animalia
- Phylum: Mollusca
- Class: Gastropoda
- Subclass: Caenogastropoda
- Order: Neogastropoda
- Superfamily: Muricoidea
- Family: Harpidae; Bronn, 1849

Genera
- See text

= Harpidae =

Family of sea snails

The Harpidae, known as the harp snails, are the members of a taxonomic family of large predatory sea snails, marine gastropod mollusks.

This family is temporarily classified in the superfamily Neogastropoda incertae sedis.

== Subfamilies and genera ==
This family consists of the following subfamilies (according to the taxonomy of the Gastropoda by Bouchet & Rocroi, 2005):

- Harpinae Bronn, 1849
- † Cryptochordinae Korobkov, 1955
- Moruminae Hughes & Emerson, 1987

Genera in the family Harpidae include:

Genus † Asiaharpa Raven, 2021
Harpinae

- Austroharpa Finlay, 1931
- † Eocithara P. Fischer, 1883
- Harpa Röding, 1798 - type genus of the family Harpidae
- Harpalis Link, 1807: synonym of Harpa Röding, 1798
- Palamharpa Iredale, 1931: synonym of Austroharpa Finlay, 1931

† Cryptochordinae

- † Cryptochorda Mörch, 1858 - type genus of the subfamily Cryptochordinae

Moruminae

- Morum Röding, 1798 - type genus of the subfamily Moruminae
- Cancellomorum Emerson & Old, 1963: synonym of Morum Röding, 1798
- Herculea H. Adams & A. Adams, 1858: synonym of Morum (Herculea) H. Adams & A. Adams, 1858 represented as Morum Röding, 1798
- Lambidium Link, 1807: synonym of Morum Röding, 1798
- Onimusiro Kuroda, Habe & Oyama, 1971: synonym of Morum Röding, 1798
- Oniscia G. B. Sowerby I, 1825: synonym of Morum Röding, 1798
- Oniscidia Mörch, 1852: synonym of Morum (Oniscidia) Mörch, 1852 represented as Morum Röding, 1798
- Pulchroniscia Garrard, 1961: synonym of Morum (Oniscidia) Mörch, 1852 represented as Morum Röding, 1798
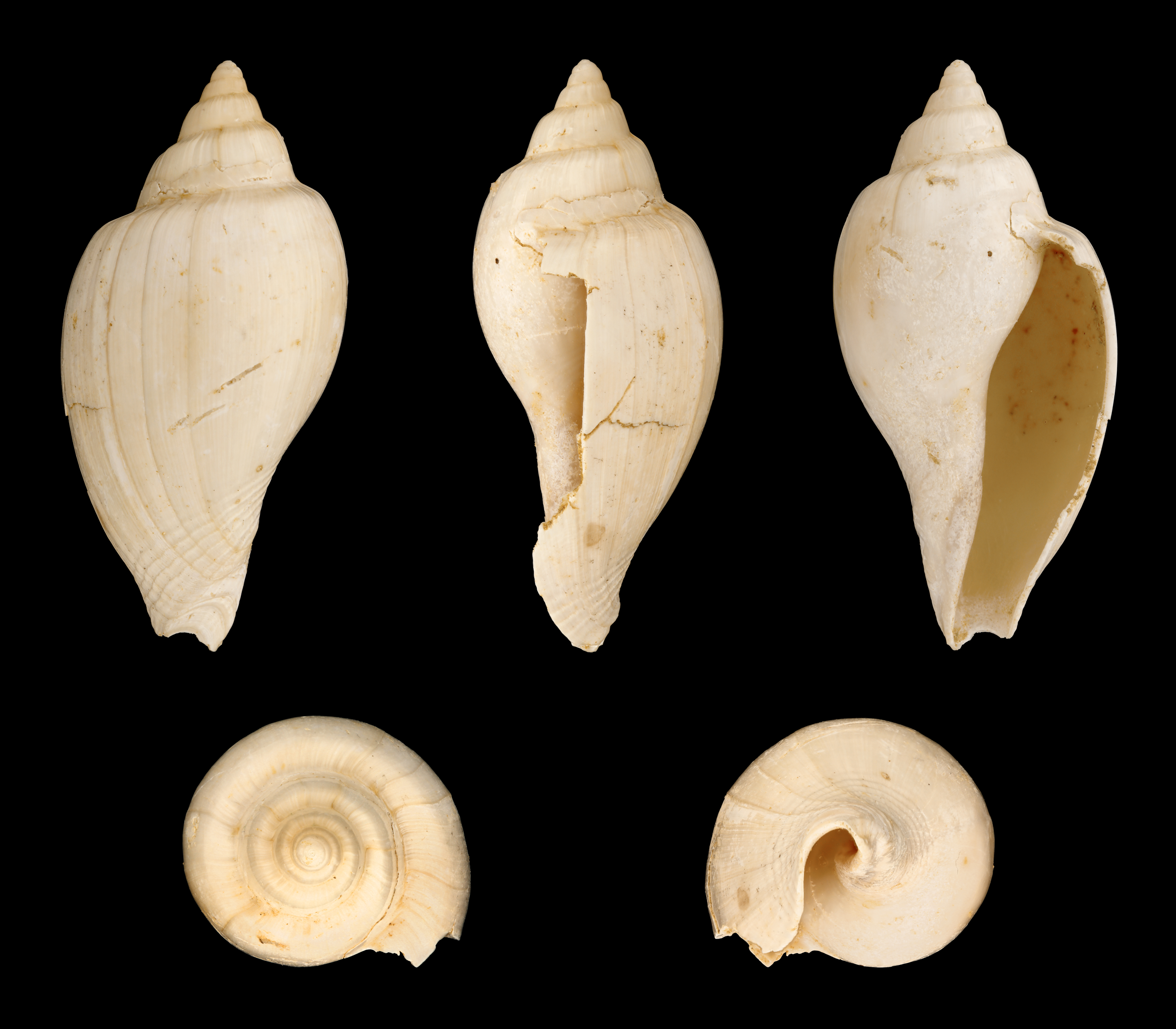
Cryptochorda stromboides

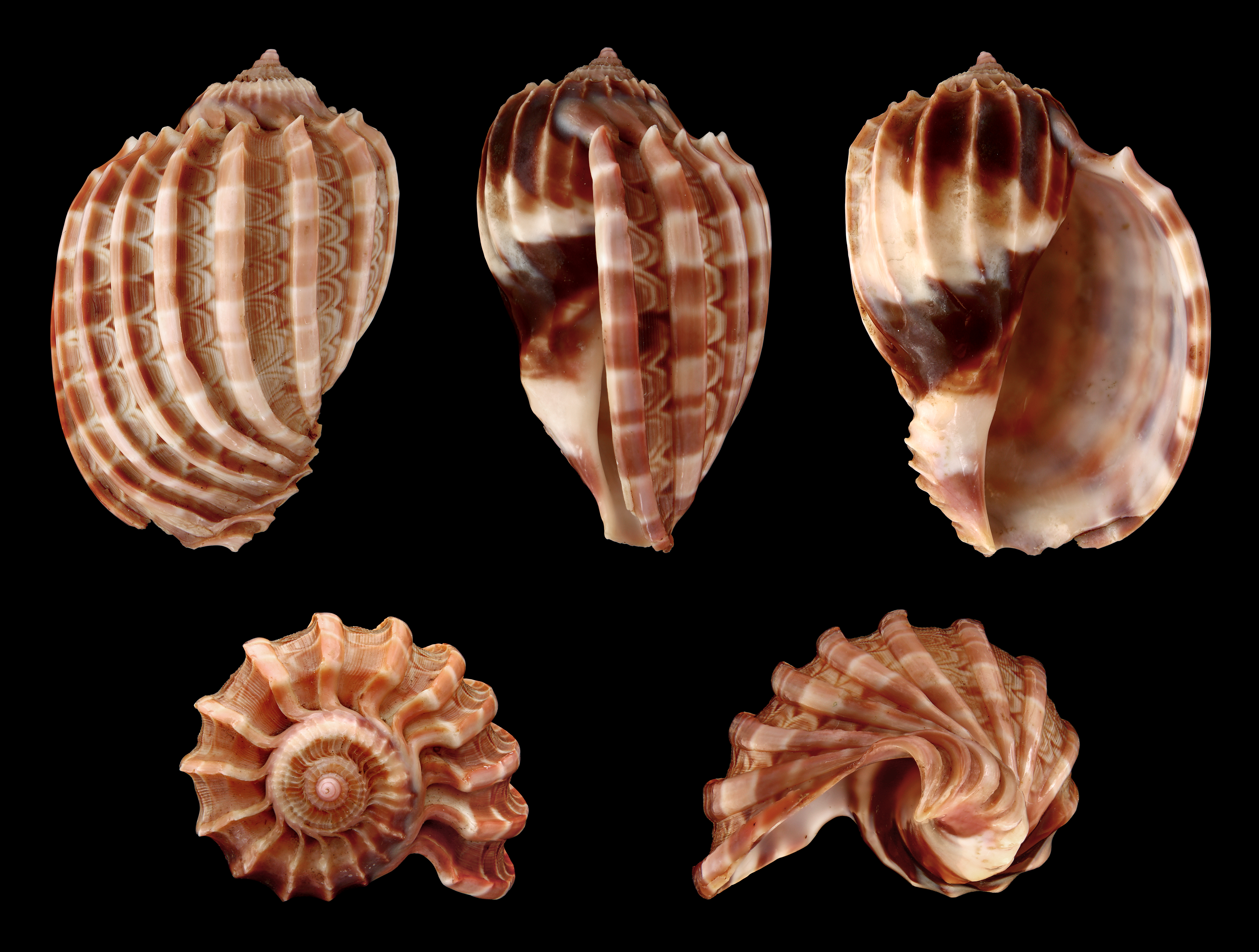
Harpa davidis

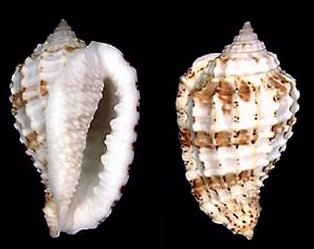
Morum cancellatum

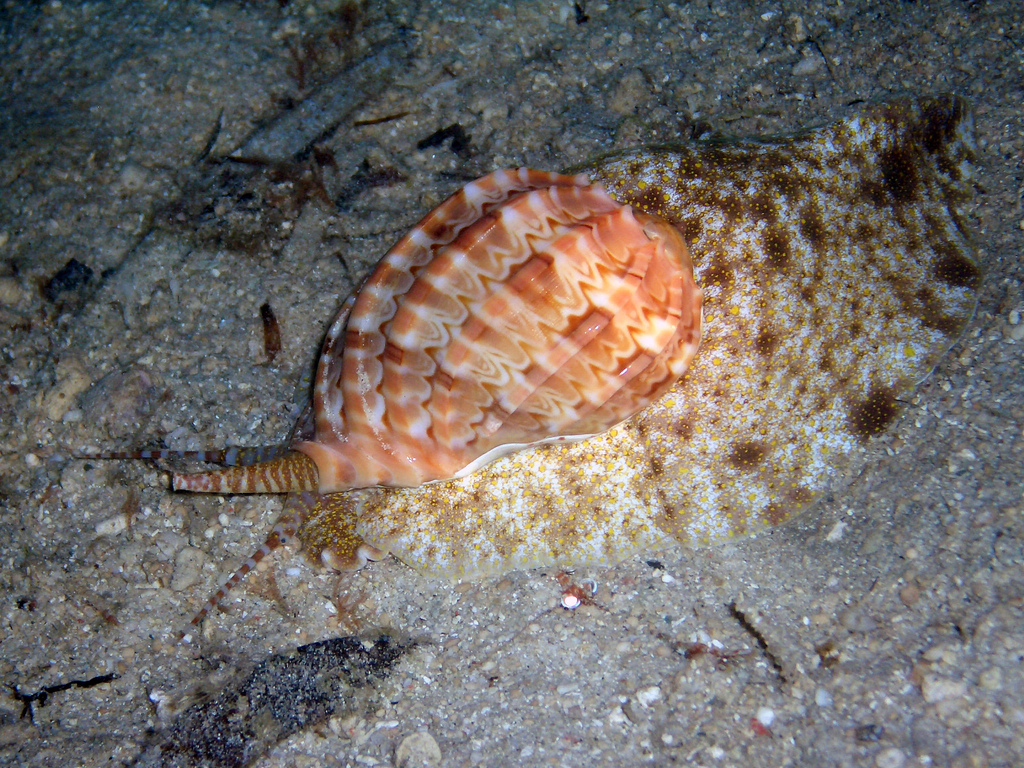
Un harpidae vivant.
