= Vexillum voncoseli =

Scientific classification
- Kingdom: Animalia
- Phylum: Mollusca
- Class: Gastropoda
- Subclass: Caenogastropoda
- Order: Neogastropoda
- Superfamily: Turbinelloidea
- Family: Costellariidae
- Genus: Vexillum
- Species: V. voncoseli

Binomial name
- Vexillum voncoseli (Poppe, Tagaro & Salisbury, 2009)

Synonyms
- Pusia voncoseli Poppe, Tagaro & Salisbury, 2009

Species of gastropod

Vexillum voncoseli is a species of sea snail, a marine gastropod mollusk, in the family Costellariidae, the ribbed miters.

== Distribution ==
This marine species occurs off the Philippines at depths between 50 m and 150 m.
