= Vexillum pedroi =

Scientific classification
- Kingdom: Animalia
- Phylum: Mollusca
- Class: Gastropoda
- Subclass: Caenogastropoda
- Order: Neogastropoda
- Superfamily: Turbinelloidea
- Family: Costellariidae
- Genus: Vexillum
- Species: V. pedroi

Binomial name
- Vexillum pedroi Poppe & Tagaro, 2006

Species of gastropod

Vexillum pedroi is a species of small sea snail, marine gastropod mollusk in the family Costellariidae, the ribbed miters.

== Description ==
The length of the shell varies between 20 mm and 38 mm.

== Distribution ==
This marine species occurs off the Philippines.
