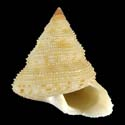
- Apertural view of a shell of Calliostoma anseeuwi

Scientific classification
- Kingdom: Animalia
- Phylum: Mollusca
- Class: Gastropoda
- Subclass: Vetigastropoda
- Order: Trochida
- Family: Calliostomatidae
- Genus: Calliostoma
- Species: C. anseeuwi

Binomial name
- Calliostoma anseeuwi Poppe, Tagaro & Dekker, 2006

= Calliostoma anseeuwi =

Species of gastropod

Calliostoma anseeuwi is a species of medium-sized deepwater sea snail, a marine gastropod mollusc in the family Calliostomatidae distinguished by its biconical teleoconch with 9–11 sharply carinated whorls adorned with alternating gold and violet spiral bands. This Philippine endemic species inhabits carbonate slopes at 180–400 m depths in the Verde Island Passage biodiversity hotspot, where it grazes on foraminiferan biofilms. The holotype (NMP 039154) was collected during the AURORA 2005 expedition, named in honor of malacologist Philippe Anseeuw. Its restricted distribution and specialized deep-reef habitat qualify it as a potential indicator species for mesophotic zone conservation.

== Description ==
The shell grows to a height of 23 mm.

== Distribution ==
This species is endemic to the Philippines. It lives at depths of between 100 and 200 m. The shell height is up to 23 mm.
