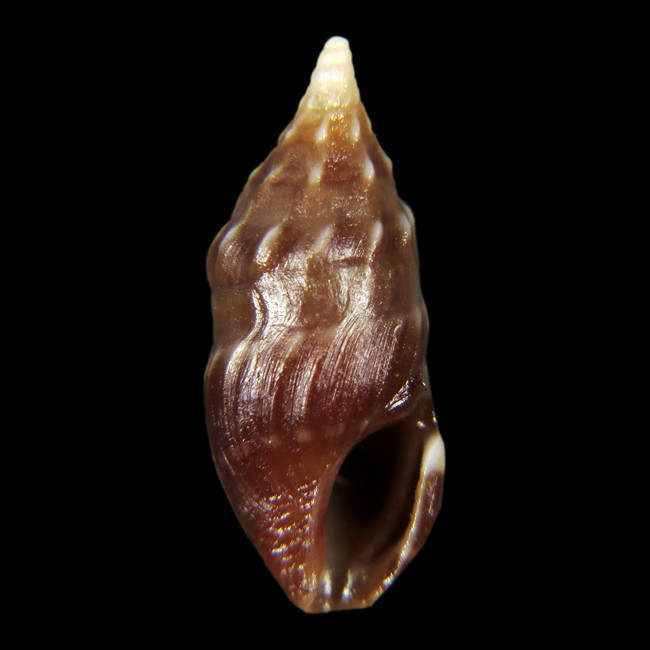

Scientific classification
- Kingdom: Animalia
- Phylum: Mollusca
- Class: Gastropoda
- Subclass: Caenogastropoda
- Order: Neogastropoda
- Family: Drilliidae
- Genus: Tylotiella
- Species: T. cloveri

Binomial name
- Tylotiella cloveri Poppe, Tagaro & Goto, 2018

= Tylotiella cloveri =

Species of gastropod

Tylotiella cloveri is a species of sea snail, a marine gastropoda mollusk in the family Drilliidae.

== Original description ==
- Poppe G.T., Tagaro S.P. & Goto Y. (2018). New marine species from the Central Philippines. Visaya. 5(1): 91-135.

page(s): 106, pl. 10 figs 1-2.
