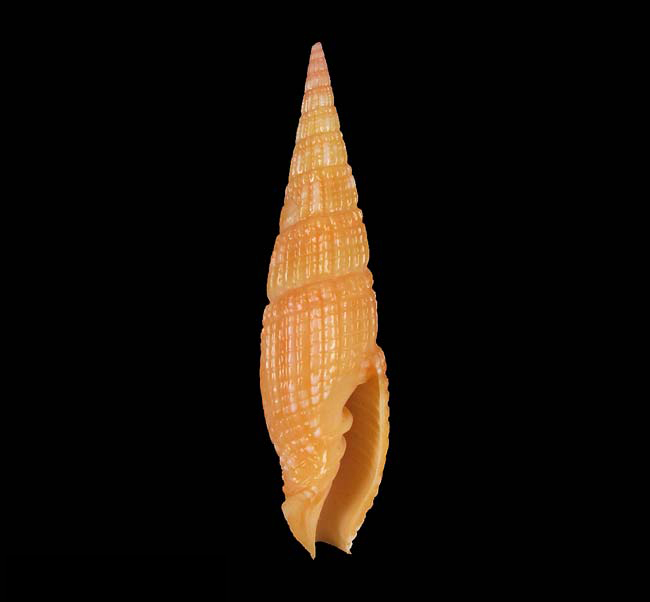
- Shell of Vexillum strnadi

Scientific classification
- Kingdom: Animalia
- Phylum: Mollusca
- Class: Gastropoda
- Subclass: Caenogastropoda
- Order: Neogastropoda
- Superfamily: Turbinelloidea
- Family: Costellariidae
- Genus: Vexillum
- Species: V. strnadi

Binomial name
- Vexillum strnadi Poppe & Tagaro, 2010

= Vexillum strnadi =

Species of gastropod

Vexillum strnadi is a species of sea snail, a marine gastropod mollusk in the family Costellariidae.

== Description ==
The length of the shell attains 41 mm.

== Distribution ==
This marine species occurs off the Philippines.
