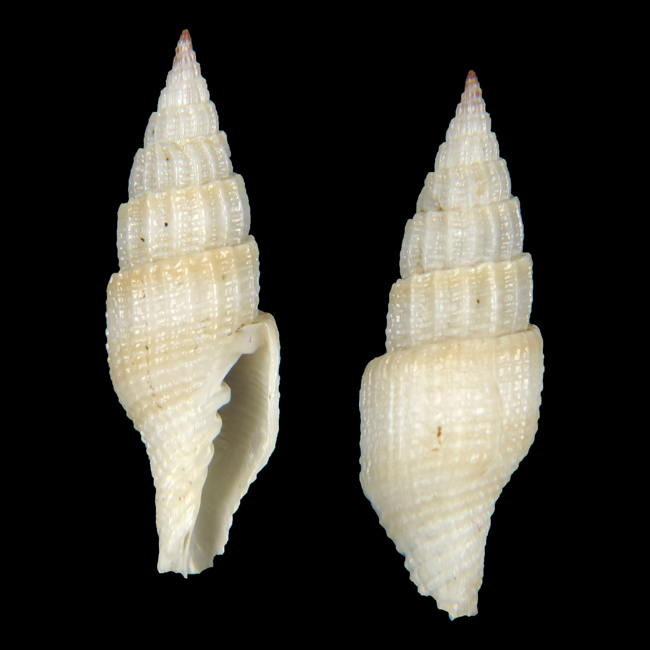

Scientific classification
- Kingdom: Animalia
- Phylum: Mollusca
- Class: Gastropoda
- Subclass: Caenogastropoda
- Order: Neogastropoda
- Family: Costellariidae
- Genus: Vexillum
- Species: V. leyteensis

Binomial name
- Vexillum leyteensis Poppe, Tagaro & Salisbury, 2009

= Vexillum leyteensis =

Species of gastropod

Vexillum leyteensis is a species of small sea snail, marine gastropod mollusk in the family Costellariidae, the ribbed miters.

== Description ==
The length of the shell attains 25 mm.

== Distribution ==
This marine species occurs off the Philippines.
