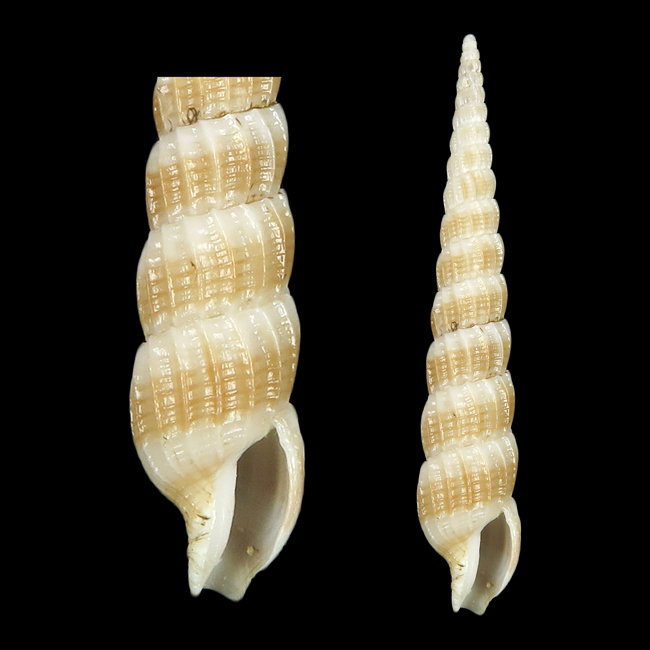

Scientific classification
- Kingdom: Animalia
- Phylum: Mollusca
- Class: Gastropoda
- Subclass: Caenogastropoda
- Order: Neogastropoda
- Family: Terebridae
- Genus: Clathroterebra
- Species: C. joelbartschi

Binomial name
- Clathroterebra joelbartschi Poppe, Tagaro & Goto, 2018

= Clathroterebra joelbartschi =

Species of gastropod

Clathroterebra joelbartschi is a species of sea snail, a marine gastropod mollusk in the family Terebridae.

== Original description ==
- Poppe G.T., Tagaro S.P. & Goto Y. (2018). New marine species from the Central Philippines. Visaya. 5(1): 91-135. page(s): 108, pl. 11 figs 1-3.
