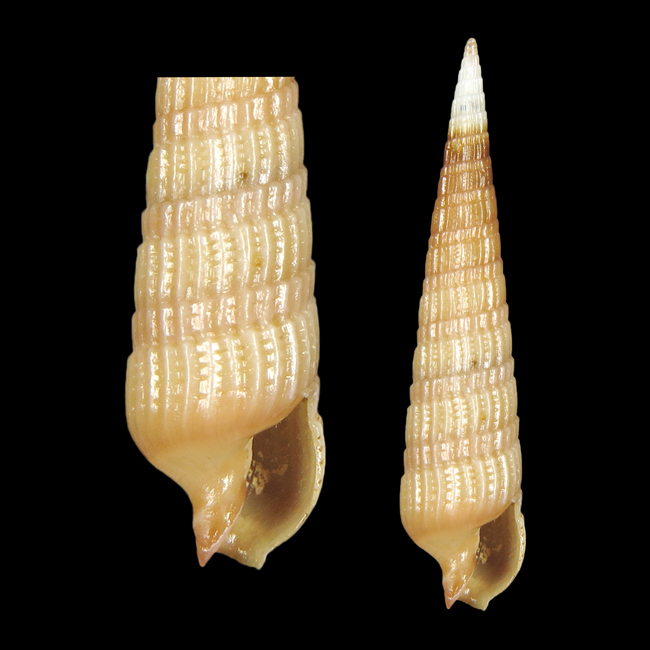

Scientific classification
- Kingdom: Animalia
- Phylum: Mollusca
- Class: Gastropoda
- Subclass: Caenogastropoda
- Order: Neogastropoda
- Family: Terebridae
- Genus: Myurella
- Species: M. okudai

Binomial name
- Myurella okudai Poppe, Tagaro & Goto, 2018

= Myurella okudai =

Species of gastropod

Myurella okudai is a species of sea snail, a marine gastropod mollusk in the family Terebridae.

== Original description ==
- Poppe G.T., Tagaro S.P. & Goto Y. (2018). New marine species from the Central Philippines. Visaya. 5(1): 91–135.

page(s): 110, pl. 12 figs 1–2.
