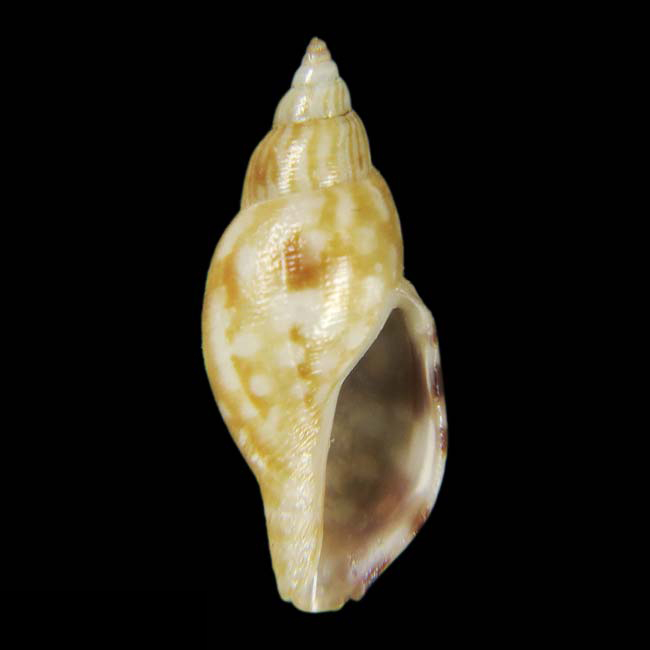
- Shell of Daphnella floridula

Scientific classification
- Kingdom: Animalia
- Phylum: Mollusca
- Class: Gastropoda
- Subclass: Caenogastropoda
- Order: Neogastropoda
- Superfamily: Conoidea
- Family: Raphitomidae
- Genus: Daphnella
- Species: D. floridula

Binomial name
- Daphnella floridula Stahlschmidt, Poppe & Chino, 2014

= Daphnella floridula =

Species of gastropod

Daphnella floridula is a species of sea snail, a marine gastropod mollusc in the family Raphitomidae.

== Description ==
The length of the shell varies between 5.5 mm and 9.5 mm.

== Distribution ==
This marine species was found off Mactan Island, Cebu, Philippines.
