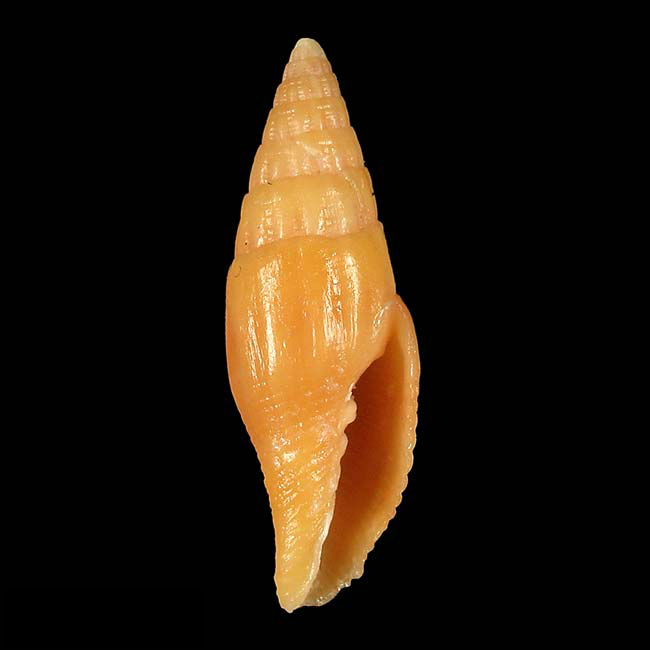

Scientific classification
- Kingdom: Animalia
- Phylum: Mollusca
- Class: Gastropoda
- Subclass: Caenogastropoda
- Order: Neogastropoda
- Family: Costellariidae
- Genus: Vexillum
- Species: V. luigiraybaudii

Binomial name
- Vexillum luigiraybaudii Poppe, Guillot de Suduiraut & Tagaro, 2006

Synonyms
- Vexillum (Pusia) luigiraybaudii Poppe, E. Guillot de Suduiraut & Tagaro, 2006 ·

= Vexillum luigiraybaudii =

Species of gastropod

Vexillum luigiraybaudii is a species of small sea snail, marine gastropod mollusk in the family Costellariidae, the ribbed miters.
