= Guido Poppe =

Belgian malacologist

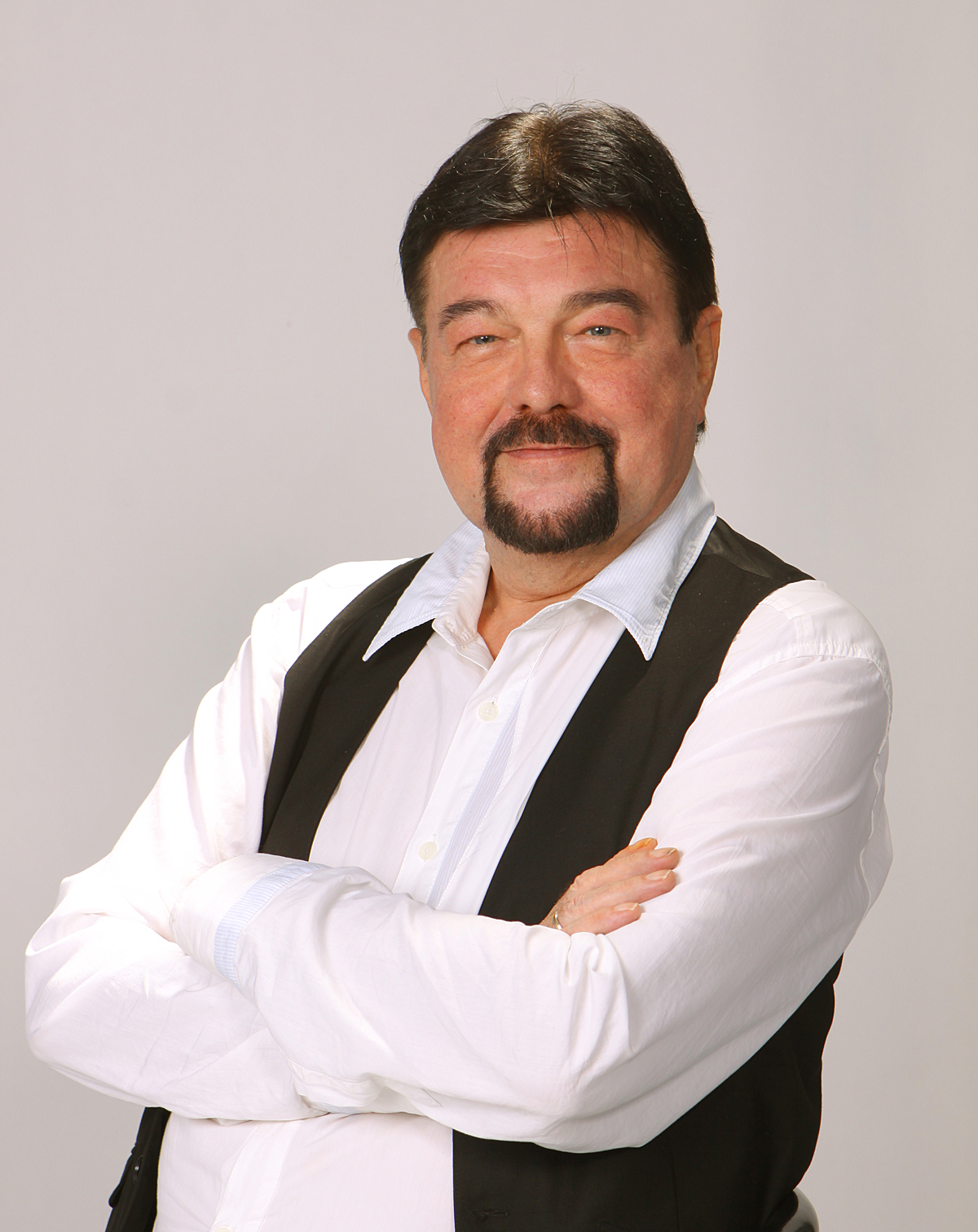
- Guido Poppe
- Born: 11 September 1954; Oudenaarde, Belgium
- Known for: research in Volutidae and Trochidae
- Scientific career
- Fields: conchology

Guido T. Poppe (born 11 September 1954) is a Belgian malacologist, shell dealer, and author of more than 60 books and publications about shells, mainly about the families Volutidae and Trochidae.

== Biography ==
The son of a sports fisherman, Poppe became fascinated in childhood by marine life during yearly holidays in Brittany, France. His first diving experiences were in these waters in 1968.

He developed a career as a professional freelance conchologist. This allowed him to dive in many parts of the world, in European waters and in many tropical seas from Baja California to Queensland, Australia. In 2003 he moved from Belgium to the Philippines. Most of his dives are now concentrated in the Philippines. After more than 6,000 dives, he has compiled a collection of photographs of seashells and marine life.

He was the vice-president of the Société Belge de Malacologie (Belgian Malacological Society) for eight years.

== Scientific work ==
Poppe discovered more than 1000 new species of Mollusca and described more than 500 of these, mainly in the families Volutidae, Trochidae, and Colloniidae as well as the Philippine malacofauna. The World Register of Marine Species (WoRMS) has listed 668 marine species named by Poppe (alone or together with others such as Sheila Tagaro, Henk Dekker, Yoshihiro Goto or Salisbury) in its database. More than 40 species have been named after him by scientists from all over the world either with the epithet poppei, guidopoppei or guidoi.

In July 2004, together with his son, Philippe, he created the journal Visaya, specialising in the taxonomy of Mollusca.

He named three species after his son: the calliostoma topsnail Calliostoma philippei (Poppe, 2004); another sea snail, Calliotropis philippei (Poppe, Tagaro & Dekker, 2006); and Bayerotrochus philpoppei (Anseeuw, Poppe & Goto, 2006). He named the topsnail Calliostoma mariae after his mother, Maria Peyskens.

== Bibliography ==
- 1979 Poppe, G.T. - Notes on Ampulla Priamus
- 1981 Poulicek, M. & Poppe, G.T. - Contribution des coquilles de Mollusques à la constitution de la fraction organodétritique des sédiments marins (Corse, mer Méditerranée) - étude faunistique préliminaire.
- 1982 Poppe, G.T. - Notes on Cymbiola marispuma Angioy and Biraghi, 1997, Festilyria festiva (Lamarck, 1811), Lyria vicdani Kosuge, 1981.
- 1982 Poppe, G.T., - Separating Voluta Sophia and Voluta cymbiola.
- 1984 Poppe, G.T., - Two new Australian Volutes.
- 1985 Poppe, G.T. - Updates on the genus Cymbiolacca (Gastropoda, Volutidae), with the description of two new taxa
- 1986 Poppe, G.T. - A novel species and a novel subspecies of Volutidae from northwestern Australia
- 1987 Poppe, G.T. - New Volutes since 1970 part I.
- 1987 Poppe, G.T. - New Volutes since 1970 part II.
- 1987 Poppe, G.T. - A novel species of Volutidae from north-western Australia.
- 1988 Poppe, G.T. - New Volutes since 1970.
- 1988 Bouchet Ph. & Poppe, G.T. - Deep water volutes from the new Caledonian region with a discussion on Biogeography.
- 1989 Martin, P. & Poppe, G.T. - Notes on the Mollusca of Easter Island: Cypraea.
- 1989 Martin, P. & Poppe, G.T. - Description of a new species of Cypraeidae from the Marquesas Islands.
- 1989 Poppe, G.T. & Martin, P. - New Findings of Cypraea teramachii Kuroda, 1938.
- 1991 Poppe, G.T. & Martin, P. - A new Trivia species from South Africa.
- 1991 Poppe & Goto: European Seashells Vol. I
- 1992 Poppe, G.T. - New species and new subspecies in Volutidae.
- 1992 Poppe & Goto: Volutes
- 1993 Poppe & Goto: European Seashells Vol. II
- 1993 Poppe & Goto: Recent Angariidae
- 1993 Poppe, G.T.: A new Cowrie.
- 1994 Poppe & Senders: An annotated price catalogue of marine shells
- 1994 Cossignani T. & Poppe G.T.: Conchiglie ed arte primitiva
- 1995 Bouchet Ph. & Poppe, G.T. – A review of the deep-water volute genus Calliotectum (Gastropoda: Volutidae).
- 1996 Poppe & Goto: A listing of Living Mollusca. Vol. I and Vol. II 2 parts each
- 2004 Poppe, G.T. & Tenorio, M.J. Description of three deep-water species of Conus from the Central Philippines.
- 2004 Poppe, G.T. - Description of Spectacular new species from the Philippines.
- 2004 Tenorio M.J. & Poppe G.T. – Description of three deep-water species of Conus from the central Philippines.
- 2004 Poppe G.T. & Fraussen K. – A new species of Nassaria from the central Philippines.
- 2004 Poppe, G.T. - Conchological Treasure from the Philippines Part I.
- 2005 Poppe, G.T., Tagaro S., Dekker H. - Discovery of new Guildfordia near Balut Island.
- 2005 Poppe, G.T., Tagaro S. & Buijse J. - A new subspecies of Cypraea hungerfordi from Aliguay Island, the Philippines.
- 2005 Poppe, G.T. & Tagaro S. - A new Conus from Aliguay Island, the Philippines.
- 2005 Poppe, G.T. - Conchological Treasures from the Philippines Part II.
- 2005 Poppe, G.T. & Fraussen K. - Revision of Phos and Antillophos (Buccinidae) from the Central Philippines.
- 2005 Poppe, G.T. & Patamakanthin S. - On the Discovery of New Population of Turbinella fusus Sowerby, 1825, a valid species.
- 2005 Poppe, G.T. & Tagaro S. - Enigmavasum enigmaticum, a new species from Cotabato, the Philippines.
- 2005 Poppe, G.T. & Tagaro, S. - A new Cymbiola (Volutidae, Gastropoda) from the Arafura Sea.
- 2005 Anseeuw & Poppe: Pleurotomariidae: An Iconographic visit anno 2005 as a supplement of Visaya
- 2006 Poppe, Tagaro & Dekker: The Seguenziidae, Chilodontidae, Trochidae, Calliostomatidae and Solariellidae of the Philippine Islands as supplement of Visaya
- 2006 Poppe, G.T. & Tagaro, S. – A New Classification of Gastropods according to Bouchet & Rocroi, 2005
- 2006 Poppe, G.T. & Tagaro, S. – Notes on two Amphidromus from the Philippine Islands.
- 2006 Poppe, G.T. & Tagaro, S. – Possible Sexual dimorphism in Ovulidae: Primovula concinna (A. Adams & Reeve, 1848).
- 2006 Anseeuw P., Poppe G.T. & Goto Y. – Description of Bayerotrochus philpoppei sp. nov. from the Philippines.
- 2006 Poppe G.T., Tagaro S.P. & Brown L. – A New Large Cirsotrema From Australia.
- 2006 Poppe G.T. & Tagaro S.P. – A New Fusinus From The Philippines.
- 2006 Poppe G.T. & Tagaro S.P. – New Mitridae and Costellariidae from the Philippines and the East China Sea.
- 2006 Poppe G.T., de Suduiraut E.G. & Tagaro S.P. – New Costellariidae from the Philippines.
- 2007 Fraussen K. & Poppe G.T. – The Genus Nassaria (Buccinidae) in the Central Philippines.
- 2007 Tenorio M.J., Poppe G.T. & Tagaro S.P., – New Indo-Pacific Conidae with Taxonomic and Nomenclatural Notes on Conus recluzianus.
- 2008 Poppe, G. T., Tagaro, S. P. & Fraussen K. – A New Nassaria from the Philippines.
- 2008 Poppe, G. T., – New Fissurellidae, Epitoniidae, Aclididae, Mitridae and Costellariidae from the Philippines.
- 2008 Poppe, with the collaboration of 23 authors "in Poppe": Philippines Marine Mollusks Vol. I
- 2008 Poppe, with the collaboration of 17 authors "in Poppe": Philippines Marine Mollusks Vol. II
- 2009 Poppe, G. T – New Taxonomic Methods in Conchology.
- 2009 Poppe, G. T, Tagaro, S.P. & Vilvens, C. – A New Clanculus (Trochidae) from the Philippines. With additional notes and new records of Trochidae-species in the Archipelago.
- 2009 Poppe, G. T & Tagaro, S.P. – A Spectacular New Conus (Conidae) from the Philippines.
- 2009 Poppe, G. T, Tagaro, S.P. & Terryn, Y. – New Terebridae from the Philippines.
- 2009 Poppe, G. T. & Groh, K. – A New Species of Trimusculus (Gastropoda: Eupulmonata: Trimusculidae) from the Central Philippines.
- 2009 Poppe, G. T, Tagaro, S.P. & Salisbury, R. – New Species of Mitridae and Costellariidae from the Philippines. With additional information on the Philippine Species in these families.
- 2009 Poppe G. T. – Conidae in the Philippine Marine Mollusks Volume II.
- 2009 Seronay, R. A. et al. - Accessing novel conoidean venoms: Biodiverse lumun-lumun marine communities, an untapped biological and toxinological resource.
- 2010 Poppe, G. T – In Memoriam of Emmanuel Guillot de Suduiraut.
- 2010 Poppe, G. T. & Tagaro, S.P. – New Species of Haloceratidae, Columbellidae, Buccinidae, Mitridae, Costellariidae, Amathinidae and Spondylidae from the Philippines.
- 2010 Poppe, with the collaboration of 9 authors "in Poppe": Philippines Marine Mollusks vol. III
- 2011 Poppe, G. T. (Translation P. Bail) – Emmanuel Guillot de Suduiraut. (1938-2010).
- 2011 Philippine Marine Mollusks – Volume IV – Guido T. Poppe with the collaboration of 13 authors "in Poppe". 676 pp. pls. 1015–1315.
- 2011 Poppe, G. T. & Tagaro, S.P. – The Egg Case of Melo broderipii.
- 2011 Poppe, G. T., Tagaro, S.P.& Chino, M. – Two new Rictaxiella (Gastropoda: Bullinidae) from the Philippines.
- 2011 Poppe, G. T. & Tagaro, S.P. – A new subspecies of Conus nobilis Linnaeus, 1758 from Solor Island, Indonesia.
- 2011 Poppe, G. T – A Listing of Philippine Marine Molluks V06-1.
- 2011 Poppe, G. T., Tagaro, S. P. & Bail, P. - Notes on the genus Cymbiola in the Philippines, with the redefinition of Cymbiola cathcartiae Reeve, 1856 and the description of Cymbiola laminusa n. sp. - Visaya vol. 3(4)
- 2011 Poppe, G. T., Tagaro, S. P. & Sarino, J. C. - Two New Species of Fissurellidae from Namibia. - Visaya vol. 3(4)
- 2012 Poppe, G. T – A Listing of Philippine Marine Molluks V07-2.
- 2012 Poppe, G. T., Tagaro, S. P. & Sarino, J. C. - A new Ceratoxancus (Gastropoda: PTYCHATRACTIDAE), from the Philippines. - Visaya vol. 3(5)
- 2012 Poppe, G. T., Monnier, E., Tagaro, S. P. - New Conidae from the Central Philippines. - Visaya vol. 3(5)
- 2012 Poppe, G. T., Tagaro, S. P., Crookshanks, D., Groh, K. & Sarino J. - A Statement on the Land Snails of Cebu. - Visaya vol. 3(6)
- 2013 Poppe, G., Tagaro, S. & Groh, K. - A New Species of Contradusta (GASTROPODA: CYPRAEIDAE) from the Philippines. - Visaya vol. 4(1)
- 2014 Stahlschmidt, P., Poppe, G. T. & Chino, M. - Description of Seven New Daphnella species from the Philippines. - Visaya vol. 4(2)
- 2014 Dekkers, A., Herrmann, M., Poppe, G. T. & Tagaro, S. P. - Three New Species of Subcancilla from the Pacific Ocean. (Gastropoda: MITRIDAE). - Visaya vol. 4(2)
- 2014 Poppe, G. T., Poppe, P., Tagaro, S.P - 1000 Shells - Exceptionals from the Philippines. ConchBooks: Hackenheim, ISBN 978-3-939767-56-5
- 2014 Poppe, G. T. - The Illustrated Catalog of the Living Cone Shells - A Review. - The Cone Collector
- 2014 Poppe, G. T. - A Selected bibliography for Conus Lovers. - The Cone Collector
- 2014 Poppe, G. T., Tagaro, S.P., Vilvens, C. - Three New Calliostoma from the Philippines. Visaya 4(2): 49–56.
- 2015 Poppe, G. T., Tagaro, S.P., Sarino, J.C. - A new Bradybaenidae and two new Diplommatinidae from the Philippines. Visaya 4(3): 14.
- 2015 Poppe, G. T., Tagaro, S.P., Stahlschmidt, P. - New Shelled Molluscan Species from the Central Philippines I. Visaya 4(3): 15–59.
- 2015 Poppe, G. T., Tagaro, S.P. - A spectacular new Conus (CONIDAE) from the Philippines. Visaya 4(4): 71–75.
- 2015 Poppe, G. T., Salisbury, R., Tagaro, S.P. - Two new MITRIDAE from the Central Pacific. Visaya 4(4): 77–84.
- 2016 Poppe, G. T., Tagaro, S.P. - New Marine Mollusks from the Central Philippines in the Families ACLIDIDAE, CHILODONTIDAE, CUSPIDARIIDAE, NUCULANIDAE, NYSTIELLIDAE, SERAPHSIDAE and VANIKORIDAE. Visaya 4(5): 83–103.
- 2016 Poppe, G. T. - Collecting Shells - In Times of Internet. 409pg
- 2017 Poppe, G. T., Tagaro, S.P. - New Conidae from the Central Philippines. Visaya 4(6): 5–18.
- 2017 Poppe, G. T. - Philippines Marine Mollusks Vol. V.
- 2018 Stahlschmidt, P., Poppe, G. T. & Tagaro, S. - Descriptions of remarkable new Turrid species form the Philippines. Visaya 5(1): 5-64
- 2018 Poppe, G. T., Tagaro, S. & Goto, Y. - New Marine Species from the Central Philippines. Visaya 5(1): 91-135
- 2019 Poppe, G. T.: About the Conidae from the Mactan Channel and Related Species. Visaya 5(2):49-53.
- 2019 Poppe, G. T. & Tagaro, S.P. A New Calliostoma from the West coast of Panama (Gastropoda: Calliostomatidae).Visaya 5(3):63-68.
- 2020 Poppe, G. T.: Belgian and French Oyster Plates in Faience
- 2020 Poppe, G. T. & Tagaro, S.P.: The Fissurellidae from the Philippines with the Description of 26 New Species. Visaya Supplement 13.
- 2020 Poppe, G. T. & Tagaro, S. P.: Description of a New Subgenus and Three New Subspecies in the Family VOLUTIDAE. Visaya 5(3):5-19.
- 2020 Poppe, G. T. & Tagaro, S. P.: Description of Two New Trochoidean Species from the Okinawa Islands. Visaya 5(4):25-31.
- 2020 Poppe, G. T.: Philippine Amphidromus A Taxonomic and Nomenclatural Puzzle. Visaya Supplement 15.
- 2021 Poppe, G.T., Tagaro S.P. & Poppe P., The Conchological Albums - Terrestrial Molluscs, Volume 1: Acavidae, Achatinellidae, Achatinidae (1). hardcover, pp. 211 with 92 color pls
- 2021 Poppe, G.T., Tagaro S.P. & Poppe P., The Conchological Albums - Terrestrial Molluscs, Volume 2: Achatinidae (2), Aciculidae, Agardhiellidae, Amastridae, Amphibulimidae, Argnidae. pp. 217 with 96 color pls.
- 2021 Poppe, G.T., Tagaro S.P. & Poppe P., The Conchological Albums - Terrestrial Molluscs, Volume 3: Annulariidae, Ariophantidae, Azecidae, Bothriembryontidae (1). hardcover, pp. 199, 87 color plates
- 2021 Poppe, G.T., Tagaro S.P. & Poppe P., The Conchological Albums - Terrestrial Molluscs, Volume 4: Bothriembryontidae (2), Bulimulidae (1). hardcover, pp. 209, 95 color plates
- 2021 Poppe, G.T., Tagaro S.P. & Poppe P., The Conchological Albums - Terrestrial Molluscs, Volume 5: Bulimulidae (2), Camaenidae (1). 197 pp., 89 color plates.
- 2021 Poppe, G.T., Tagaro S.P. & Poppe P., The Conchological Albums - Terrestrial Molluscs, Volume 6: Camaenidae (2), 197 pp., 90 color plates.
- 2022 Poppe, G.T., Tagaro S.P. & Poppe P., The Conchological Albums - Terrestrial Molluscs, Volume 7: Camaenidae (3), 207 pp., 97 color plates
- 2022 Poppe, G.T., Tagaro S.P. & Poppe P., The Conchological Albums - Terrestrial Molluscs, Volume 8: Camaenidae (4), 183 pp., 83 color plates
- 2022 Poppe, G.T., Tagaro S.P. & Poppe P., The Conchological Albums - Terrestrial Molluscs, Volume 9: Camaenidae (5), 207 pp., 95 color plates
- 2022 Poppe, G.T., Tagaro S.P. & Poppe P., The Conchological Albums - Terrestrial Molluscs, Volume 10: Camaenidae (7), Canariellidae, Caryodidae, Cepolidae, Cerastidae, 203 pp., 95 color plates
- 2022 Poppe, G.T., Tagaro S.P. & Poppe P., The Conchological Albums - Terrestrial Molluscs, Volume 11: Camaenidae (6), 191 pp., 86 color plates
- 2023 Poppe, G.T., Tagaro S.P. & Poppe P., The Conchological Albums - Terrestrial Molluscs, Volume 12: Cerionidae, Charopidae, Chondrinidae, Chronidae, 173 pp., 77 color plates
- 2023 Poppe, G.T., Tagaro, S.P. & Huang S.-I., The recent Colloniidae, 372 pp, 78 color plates
- 2023 Poppe, G.T., Tagaro, S.P., A new Neripteron (Neritidae) from the Central Philippines. Gloria Maris 61(3): 122-125.
- 2023 Poppe, Guido & Sheila Tagaro. 2023. A New Acteon from West Africa. Visaya 5(6): 9-12.
- 2023 Poppe, Guido & Sheila Tagaro. 2023. A Spectacular New Crosseola from the Philippines. Visaya 5(6): 5-8.
- 2023 Poppe, Guido & Sheila Tagaro. 2023. New Species of Nuculanidae from the Philippines. Visaya 5(6): 39-50.
- 2023 Poppe, Guido & Sheila Tagaro. 2023. The Acteonidae of the Philippines. A short study with the description of newly discovered species. Visaya 5(6): 13-37.
- 2023 Poppe, Guido & Sheila Tagaro. 2023. Three New Species of Conus from the Indo-Pacific and on Wrong Interpretations in the Literature on Conidae. Visaya 5(6): 59-68.
- 2025 Poppe, Guido & Sheila Tagaro. 2025. A new Pionoconus from the Central Philippines. Visaya6(2): 5-13.
- 2025 Poppe, Guido, Sheila Tagaro & Shih-I Huang. 2025. The Recent COLLONIIDAE with A Study of the COLLONIIDAE Collected by Various Expeditions of the Muséum national d'Histoire naturelle, Paris. Conchbooks, Germany. Vol. 2: 93.
- 2025 Poppe, Guido. 2025. Donggang shells New deep-water species from Taiwan. Visaya 6(3): 5-49.
- 2026 Poppe, Guido & Sheila Tagaro. 2026. 51 New Molluscan Species. Visaya Supplement 20: 71.

In 1999 with Klaus Groh, he started the series "A Conchological Iconography". The following volumes have already appeared:

- 1999 Dance, Poppe & Brulet: The family Harpidae. A conchological iconography, ConchBooks: Hackenheim, ISBN 3-925919-28-7
- 1999 Kreipl, Poppe, Man in't Veld & De Turck: The family Strombidae. A conchological iconography, ConchBooks: Hackenheim, ISBN 3-925919-29-5
- 2000 Verhaeghe & Poppe: The family Ficidae. . A conchological iconography, ConchBooks: Hackenheim, ISBN 3-92591927-9
- 2000 Geiger & Poppe: The family Haliotidae. A conchological iconography, ConchBooks: Hackenheim, ISBN 3-925919-31-7
- 2001 Bail, Limpus & Poppe: The genus Amoria. A conchological iconography, ConchBooks: Hackenheim, ISBN 3-925919-46-5
- 2001 Bail & Poppe: A Taxonomic Introduction to the Recent Volutidae
- 2002 Groh, Poppe & Charles: The family Acavidae excluding genus Ampelita. A conchological iconography, ConchBooks: Hackenheim, ISBN 3-925919-48-1
- 2003 Alf, Kreipl & Poppe: The Family Turbinidae, Subfamily Turbininae, Genus Turbo
- 2004 Bail & Poppe: The Tribe Lyriini. A revision of the Recent species of the genera Lyria, Callipara, Harpulina, Enaeta and Leptoscapa. A conchological iconography, ConchBooks: Hackenheim, ISBN 3-925919-65-1
- 2004 Monteiro A., Tenorio, J.M. & Poppe G.T.: The genus Conus of West Africa and the Mediterranean. A conchological iconography, ConchBooks: Hackenheim, ISBN 3-925919-68-6
- 2005 Bail P, Limpus A. & Terryn Y.: The Recent Volutes of New Zealand
- 2006 Raines B.K. & Poppe G.T.: The Family Pectinidae
- 2007 Fraussen K. & Terryn Y.: The family Buccinidae, genus Neptunea
- 2007 Vos C. & Terryn Y.: The family Tonnidae
- 2008 Tenorio, J. M. & Monteiro, A. & Terryn Y.: The South African species of Conus
- 2010 Bail P. & Chino M.: The Family Volutidae
- 2011 Alf. A. & Kreipl, K.: "Turbinidae Vol. II", Conchbooks: Hackenheim, ISBN 978-3-939767-39-8
- 2011 Alf, A. & Kreipl, K.: "The Family Turbinidae, subfamily Turbininae, genus Turbo, Supplement 1", Conchbooks: Hackenheim
- 2012 Tenorio, M.J., Tucker, J.K., Chaney, H.W.: "The families Conilithidae and Conidae: The cones of the Eastern Pacific", Conchbooks: Hackenheim, ISBN 978-3-939767-42-8
- 2013 Fraussen, K. & Stratmann, D.: "The family Babyloniidae", Conchbooks: Hackenheim, ISBN 978-3-939767-47-3
- 2013 Liverani, V.: "The Superfamily Stromboidea - Addenda and Corrigenda. (Suppl. 2) ", Conchbooks: Hackenheim

Poppe also wrote articles in journals and magazines such as Hawaiian Shell News, Of Sea and Shore, Malacologia, Apex, Novapex, Musorstom, Informations, Gloria Maris, and Visaya.

== Scientific collections ==
As a collector he built major conchological collections, which are now housed in museums:

- Aesthetic collection in the Muséum national d'histoire naturelle, Paris.
- European collection in the Bailey-Matthews Shell Museum, Florida.
- Trochidae collection in the Muséum d'histoire naturelle de Genève, Geneva.
- General collection in the Koninklijk Belgisch Instituut voor Natuurwetenschappen, Brussels. The latter collection forms an important addition to the Philippe Dautzenberg collection and together both collections form the core of the conchological collections of the institute.
- Faunistical collection of Philippine shells in the Houston Museum of Natural Science, USA. This collection consists of over 25,000 fully documented specimens from the Philippines, which include corresponding scientific collecting and meta data, photographs and shared copyrights. Over 6,250 known species are represented in the collection and over 1000 newly discovered species likely unknown to science.

== Recognition ==
- In 1996, he was honoured by the Museum national d'Histoire naturelle in Paris and given the title of Correspondent of the Museum.
- In 2006, he received the title of Scientific Associate, Malacologie Section, Royal Belgian Institute of Natural Sciences.

== Taxonomic work ==
Poppe has described 538 species, genera, subgenera, families, subfamilies and tribes.

ACAVIDAE

- Cylindroclavator K. Groh & G.T. Poppe, 2002 - n. subg.
- Embertoniphanta K. Groh & G.T. Poppe, 2002 - n. gen.
- Nigriphanta K. Groh & G.T. Poppe, 2002 - n. subg.
- Paraclavator K. Groh & G.T. Poppe, 2002 - n. gen.
- Spiriphanta K. Groh & G.T. Poppe, 2002 - n. subg.

ACLIDIDAE

- Aclis maestratii G.T. Poppe & S.P. Tagaro, 2016 - n. sp.
- Cyclonidea dondani G.T. Poppe & S.P. Tagaro, 2016 - n. sp.
- Cyclonidea notabilis G.T. Poppe, 2008 - n. sp.

ACTEONIDAE

- Acteon dancei G.T. Poppe, S.P. Tagaro & P. Stahlschmidt, 2015 - n. sp.
- Acteon isabella G.T. Poppe, S.P. Tagaro & Y. Goto, 2018 - n. sp.
- Acteon valentina G.T. Poppe, S.P. Tagaro & P. Stahlschmidt, 2015 - n. sp.
- Acteon vangoethemi G.T. Poppe, S.P. Tagaro & P. Stahlschmidt, 2015 - n. sp.

AMATHINIDAE

- Iselica altum G.T. Poppe, S.P. Tagaro & Y. Goto, 2018 - n. sp.
- Leucotina knopi G.T. Poppe & S.P. Tagaro, 2010 - n. sp.

ANCILLARIIDAE

- Ancilla reboriae G.T. Poppe, S.P. Tagaro & Y. Goto, 2018 - n. sp.

ANGARIIDAE

- Angaria neglecta G.T. Poppe & Y. Goto, 1993 - n. sp.

ARCIDAE

- Bathyarca lucida G.T. Poppe, S.P. Tagaro & Y. Goto, 2018 - n. sp.

BORSONIIDAE

- Bathytoma klinkeni G.T. Poppe & S.P. Tagaro, 2021 - n. sp.
- Drilliola barnsi G.T. Poppe & S.P. Tagaro, 2021 - n. sp.
- Drilliola labradorae G.T. Poppe & S.P. Tagaro, 2021 - n. sp.
- Drilliola macanensis G.T. Poppe & S.P. Tagaro, 2021 - n. sp.
- Drilliola multispiralis G.T. Poppe & S.P. Tagaro, 2021 - n. sp.
- Drilliola reevii G.T. Poppe & S.P. Tagaro, 2021 - n. sp.
- Microdrillia engelsi G.T. Poppe & S.P. Tagaro, 2021 - n. sp.
- Microdrillia papavasili G.T. Poppe & S.P. Tagaro, 2021 - n. sp.
- Microdrillia rhomboidales P. Stahlschmidt, G.T. Poppe & S.P. Tagaro, 2018 - n. sp.
- Microdrillia singularis G.T. Poppe & S.P. Tagaro, 2021 - n. sp.

BRADYBAENIDAE

- Calocochlia chocolatina G.T. Poppe, S.P. Tagaro & J. Sarino, 2015 - n. sp.

BUCCINIDAE

- Antillophos armillatus K. Fraussen & G.T. Poppe, 2005 - n. sp.
- Antillophos dedonderi K. Fraussen & G.T. Poppe, 2005 - n. sp.
- Antillophos deprinsi K. Fraussen & G.T. Poppe, 2005 - n. sp.
- Antillophos durianoides K. Fraussen & G.T. Poppe, 2005 - n. sp.
- Antillophos hastilis K. Fraussen & G.T. Poppe, 2005 - n. sp.
- Antillophos idyllium K. Fraussen & G.T. Poppe, 2005 - n. sp.
- Antillophos intactus K. Fraussen & G.T. Poppe, 2005 - n. sp.
- Antillophos lucubratonis K. Fraussen & G.T. Poppe, 2005 - n. sp.
- Antillophos miculus K. Fraussen & G.T. Poppe, 2005 - n. sp.
- Antillophos monsecourorum K. Fraussen & G.T. Poppe, 2005 - n. sp.
- Antillophos opimus K. Fraussen & G.T. Poppe, 2005 - n. sp.
- Antillophos scitamentus K. Fraussen & G.T. Poppe, 2005 - n. sp.
- Antillophos tsokobuntodis K. Fraussen & G.T. Poppe, 2005 - n. sp.
- Belomitra leobrerorum G.T. Poppe & S.P. Tagaro, 2010 - n. sp.
- Cantharus petwayae G.T. Poppe, S.P. Tagaro & Y. Goto, 2018 - n. sp.
- Nassaria callomoni G.T. Poppe, S.P. Tagaro & K. Fraussen, 2008 - n. sp.
- Nassaria exquisita K. Fraussen & G.T. Poppe, 2007 - n. sp.
- Nassaria gyroscopoides K. Fraussen & G.T. Poppe, 2007 - n. sp.
- Nassaria perlata K. Fraussen & G.T. Poppe, 2004 - n. sp.
- Nassaria thalassomeli K. Fraussen & G.T. Poppe, 2007 - n. sp.
- Nassaria thesaura K. Fraussen & G.T. Poppe, 2007 - n. sp.
- Nassaria wanneri visayensis K. Fraussen & G.T. Poppe, 2007 - n. subsp.
- Phos temperatus K. Fraussen & G.T. Poppe, 2005 - n. sp.
- Phos vandenberghi K. Fraussen & G.T. Poppe, 2005 - n. sp.

BULLINIDAE

- Rictaxiella debelius G.T. Poppe, S.P. Tagaro & M. Chino, 2011 - n. sp.
- Rictaxiella joyae G.T. Poppe, S.P. Tagaro & M. Chino, 2011 - n. sp.

CALLIOSTOMATIDAE

- Calliostoma aculeatum aliguayensis G.T. Poppe, S.P. Tagaro & H. Dekker, 2006 - n. subsp.
- Calliostoma anseeuwi G.T. Poppe, S.P. Tagaro & H. Dekker, 2006 - n. sp.
- Calliostoma basulensis G.T. Poppe, S.P. Tagaro & C. Vilvens, 2014 - n. sp.
- Calliostoma chinoi G.T. Poppe, S.P. Tagaro & H. Dekker, 2006 - n. sp.
- Calliostoma connyae G.T. Poppe, S.P. Tagaro & C. Vilvens, 2014 - n. sp.
- Calliostoma escondida G.T. Poppe, S.P. Tagaro & C. Vilvens, 2014 - n. sp.
- Calliostoma guphili G.T. Poppe, 2004 - n. sp.
- Calliostoma katorii G.T. Poppe, S.P. Tagaro & Y. Goto, 2018 - n. sp.
- Calliostoma lequementorum G.T. Poppe & S.P. Tagaro, 2019 - n. sp.
- Calliostoma maekawai G.T. Poppe, S.P. Tagaro & Y. Goto, 2018 - n. sp.
- Calliostoma mariei G.T. Poppe, S.P. Tagaro & H. Dekker, 2006 - n. sp.
- Calliostoma philippei G.T. Poppe, 2004 - n. sp.
- Calliostoma swinneni G.T. Poppe, S.P. Tagaro & H. Dekker, 2006 - n. sp.
- Calliostoma trotini G.T. Poppe, S.P. Tagaro & H. Dekker, 2006 - n. sp.
- Calliostoma vilvensi G.T. Poppe, 2004 - n. sp.

CAMAENIDAE

- Amphidromus escondidus G.T. Poppe, 2020 - n. sp.

CHILODONTIDAE

- Calliotropis boucheti G.T. Poppe, S.P. Tagaro & H. Dekker, 2006 - n. sp.
- Calliotropis francocacii G.T. Poppe, S.P. Tagaro & H. Dekker, 2006 - n. sp.
- Calliotropis malapascuensis G.T. Poppe, S.P. Tagaro & H. Dekker, 2006 - n. sp.
- Calliotropis minorusaitoi G.T. Poppe, S.P. Tagaro & H. Dekker, 2006 - n. sp.
- Calliotropis philippei G.T. Poppe, S.P. Tagaro & H. Dekker, 2006 - n. sp.
- Calliotropis sagarinoi G.T. Poppe, S.P. Tagaro & H. Dekker, 2006 - n. sp.
- Calliotropis stanyi G.T. Poppe, S.P. Tagaro & H. Dekker, 2006 - n. sp.
- Calliotropis vilvensi G.T. Poppe, S.P. Tagaro & H. Dekker, 2006 - n. sp.
- Calliotropis virginiae G.T. Poppe, S.P. Tagaro & H. Dekker, 2006 - n. sp.
- Calliotropis wilsi G.T. Poppe, S.P. Tagaro & H. Dekker, 2006 - n. sp.
- Calliotropis yukikoae G.T. Poppe, S.P. Tagaro & H. Dekker, 2006 - n. sp.
- Chilodonta suduirauti G.T. Poppe, S.P. Tagaro & H. Dekker, 2006 - n. sp.
- Danilia strattmani G.T. Poppe, S.P. Tagaro & H. Dekker, 2006 - n. sp.
- Euchelus decora G.T. Poppe & S.P. Tagaro, 2016 - n. sp.
- Herpetopoma barbieri G.T. Poppe, S.P. Tagaro & H. Dekker, 2006 - n. sp.
- Herpetopoma naokoae G.T. Poppe, S.P. Tagaro & H. Dekker, 2006 - n. sp.
- Perrinia cecileae G.T. Poppe, S.P. Tagaro & H. Dekker, 2006 - n. sp.
- Perrinia docili G.T. Poppe, S.P. Tagaro & H. Dekker, 2006 - n. sp.
- Schepmanotropis G.T. Poppe, S.P. Tagaro & H. Dekker, 2006 - n. subg.
- Spinicalliotropis G.T. Poppe, S.P. Tagaro & H. Dekker, 2006 - n. subg.
- Spinicalliotropis spinosa G.T. Poppe, S.P. Tagaro & H. Dekker, 2006 - n. sp.
- Vaceuchelus abdii G.T. Poppe, S.P. Tagaro & H. Dekker, 2006 - n. sp.
- Vaceuchelus entienzai G.T. Poppe & S.P. Tagaro, 2016 - n. sp.
- Vaceuchelus ludiviniae G.T. Poppe, S.P. Tagaro & H. Dekker, 2006 - n. sp.
- Vaceuchelus pagoboorum G.T. Poppe, S.P. Tagaro & H. Dekker, 2006 - n. sp.
- Vaceuchelus saguili G.T. Poppe, S.P. Tagaro & H. Dekker, 2006 - n. sp.
- Vaceuchelus vallesi G.T. Poppe, S.P. Tagaro & H. Dekker, 2006 - n. sp.
- Vaceuchelus vangoethemi G.T. Poppe, S.P. Tagaro & H. Dekker, 2006 - n. sp.

CLATHURELLIDAE

- Clathurella colombi P. Stahlschmidt, G.T. Poppe & S.P. Tagaro, 2018 - n. sp.
- Clathurella verrucosa P. Stahlschmidt, G.T. Poppe & S.P. Tagaro, 2018 - n. sp.

COLLONIIDAE

- Argalista lorenzi G.T. Poppe, S.P. Tagaro & S.-I. Huang, 2023 - n. sp.
- Argalista morrisoni G.T. Poppe, S.P. Tagaro & S.-I. Huang, 2023 - n. sp.
- Argalista parvipulcherrima G.T. Poppe, S.P. Tagaro & S.-I. Huang, 2023 - n. sp.
- Artiscollonia G.T. Poppe, S.P. Tagaro & S.-I. Huang, 2023 - n. gen.
- Artiscollonia fedosovi G.T. Poppe, S.P. Tagaro & S.-I. Huang, 2023 - n. sp.
- Artiscollonia mainguyi G.T. Poppe, S.P. Tagaro & S.-I. Huang, 2023 - n. sp.
- Artiscollonia mirans G.T. Poppe, S.P. Tagaro & S.-I. Huang, 2023 - n. sp.
- Artiscollonia monalizae G.T. Poppe, S.P. Tagaro & S.-I. Huang, 2023 - n. sp.
- Artiscollonia nix G.T. Poppe, S.P. Tagaro & S.-I. Huang, 2023 - n. sp.
- Artiscollonia placens G.T. Poppe, S.P. Tagaro & S.-I. Huang, 2023 - n. sp.
- Artiscollonia tongana G.T. Poppe, S.P. Tagaro & S.-I. Huang, 2023 - n. sp.
- Cantrainea alfi S.-I. Huang, C.C. Fu & G.T. Poppe, 2016 - n. sp.
- Cantrainea mariegalanteae G.T. Poppe, S.P. Tagaro & S.-I. Huang, 2023 - n. sp.
- Circumcollonia G.T. Poppe, S.P. Tagaro & S.-I. Huang, 2023 - n. gen.
- Circumcollonia broggii G.T. Poppe, S.P. Tagaro & S.-I. Huang, 2023 - n. sp.
- Circumcollonia sarinoae G.T. Poppe, S.P. Tagaro & S.-I. Huang, 2023 - n. sp.
- Collonista albicans G.T. Poppe, S.P. Tagaro & S.-I. Huang, 2023 - n. sp.
- Collonista alta G.T. Poppe, S.P. Tagaro & S.-I. Huang, 2023 - n. sp.
- Collonista altabai G.T. Poppe, S.P. Tagaro & S.-I. Huang, 2023 - n. sp.
- Collonista anguis G.T. Poppe, S.P. Tagaro & S.-I. Huang, 2023 - n. sp.
- Collonista arcana G.T. Poppe, S.P. Tagaro & S.-I. Huang, 2023 - n. sp.
- Collonista balicasagensis G.T. Poppe, S.P. Tagaro & S.-I. Huang, 2023 - n. sp.
- Collonista caledonica G.T. Poppe, S.P. Tagaro & S.-I. Huang, 2023 - n. sp.
- Collonista galli G.T. Poppe, S.P. Tagaro & S.-I. Huang, 2023 - n. sp.
- Collonista gemma G.T. Poppe, S.P. Tagaro & S.-I. Huang, 2023 - n. sp.
- Collonista gorii G.T. Poppe, S.P. Tagaro & S.-I. Huang, 2023 - n. sp.
- Collonista hejingi G.T. Poppe, S.P. Tagaro & S.-I. Huang, 2023 - n. sp.
- Collonista herosae G.T. Poppe, S.P. Tagaro & S.-I. Huang, 2023 - n. sp.
- Collonista lemusi G.T. Poppe, S.P. Tagaro & S.-I. Huang, 2023 - n. sp.
- Collonista liminis G.T. Poppe, S.P. Tagaro & S.-I. Huang, 2023 - n. sp.
- Collonista madagascariensis G.T. Poppe, S.P. Tagaro & S.-I. Huang, 2023 - n. sp.
- Collonista maestratii G.T. Poppe, S.P. Tagaro & S.-I. Huang, 2023 - n. sp.
- Collonista mira G.T. Poppe, S.P. Tagaro & S.-I. Huang, 2023 - n. sp.
- Collonista musorstomi G.T. Poppe, S.P. Tagaro & S.-I. Huang, 2023 - n. sp.
- Collonista nova G.T. Poppe, S.P. Tagaro & S.-I. Huang, 2023 - n. sp.
- Collonista papuensis G.T. Poppe, S.P. Tagaro & S.-I. Huang, 2023 - n. sp.
- Collonista petuchi G.T. Poppe, S.P. Tagaro & S.-I. Huang, 2023 - n. sp.
- Collonista philpoppei G.T. Poppe, S.P. Tagaro & S.-I. Huang, 2023 - n. sp.
- Collonista richeri G.T. Poppe, S.P. Tagaro & S.-I. Huang, 2023 - n. sp.
- Collonista ritteri G.T. Poppe, S.P. Tagaro & S.-I. Huang, 2023 - n. sp.
- Collonista superstes G.T. Poppe, S.P. Tagaro & S.-I. Huang, 2023 - n. sp.
- Collonista taolagnaroi G.T. Poppe, S.P. Tagaro & S.-I. Huang, 2023 - n. sp.
- Collonista thachi S.-I. Huang, C.C. Fu & G.T. Poppe, 2016 - n. sp.
- Collonista troglodytes G.T. Poppe, S.P. Tagaro & S.-I. Huang, 2023 - n. sp.
- Complicatacollonista G.T. Poppe, S.P. Tagaro & S.-I. Huang, 2023 - n. gen.
- Contundere G.T. Poppe, S.P. Tagaro & S.-I. Huang, 2023 - n. gen.
- Denticallosia G.T. Poppe, S.P. Tagaro & S.-I. Huang, 2023 - n. gen.
- Denticallosiinae G.T. Poppe, S.P. Tagaro & S.-I. Huang, 2023 - n. subfam.
- Escondidacantrainea G.T. Poppe, S.P. Tagaro & S.-I. Huang, 2023 - n. gen.
- Escondidacantrainea chenyanseni G.T. Poppe, S.P. Tagaro & S.-I. Huang, 2023 - n. sp.
- Escondidacantrainea chrisvosi G.T. Poppe, S.P. Tagaro & S.-I. Huang, 2023 - n. sp.
- Escondidacantrainea samadiae G.T. Poppe, S.P. Tagaro & S.-I. Huang, 2023 - n. sp.
- Escondidacantrainea secreta G.T. Poppe, S.P. Tagaro & S.-I. Huang, 2023 - n. sp.
- Escondidacantrainea terpoorteni G.T. Poppe, S.P. Tagaro & S.-I. Huang, 2023 - n. sp.
- Gigahomalopoma G.T. Poppe, S.P. Tagaro & S.-I. Huang, 2023 - n. gen.
- Glabracollonia G.T. Poppe, S.P. Tagaro & S.-I. Huang, 2023 - n. gen.
- Glabracollonia consuegra G.T. Poppe, S.P. Tagaro & S.-I. Huang, 2023 - n. sp.
- Glabracollonia lepoutrei G.T. Poppe, S.P. Tagaro & S.-I. Huang, 2023 - n. sp.
- Glabracollonia problematica G.T. Poppe, S.P. Tagaro & S.-I. Huang, 2023 - n. sp.
- Glabracollonia sordida G.T. Poppe, S.P. Tagaro & S.-I. Huang, 2023 - n. sp.
- Glabracollonia yvetteae G.T. Poppe, S.P. Tagaro & S.-I. Huang, 2023 - n. sp.
- Gloriacollonia G.T. Poppe, S.P. Tagaro & S.-I. Huang, 2023 - n. gen.
- Homalopoma concors S.-I. Huang, C.C. Fu & G.T. Poppe, 2016 - n. sp.
- Homalopoma himuquitanense S.-I. Huang, C.C. Fu & G.T. Poppe, 2016 - n. sp.
- Homalopoma hui S.-I. Huang, C.C. Fu & G.T. Poppe, 2016 - n. sp.
- Homalopoma imberculi S.-I. Huang, C.C. Fu & G.T. Poppe, 2016 - n. sp.
- Homalopoma keyurare S.-I. Huang, C.C. Fu & G.T. Poppe, 2016 - n. sp.
- Homalopoma lini S.-I. Huang, C.C. Fu & G.T. Poppe, 2016 - n. sp.
- Homalopoma lunellum S.-I. Huang, C.C. Fu & G.T. Poppe, 2016 - n. sp.
- Homalopoma mactanense S.-I. Huang, C.C. Fu & G.T. Poppe, 2016 - n. sp.
- Homalopoma mikkelsenae S.-I. Huang, C.C. Fu & G.T. Poppe, 2016 - n. sp.
- Homalopoma nubisrubri S.-I. Huang, C.C. Fu & G.T. Poppe, 2016 - n. sp.
- Homalopoma parvum S.-I. Huang, C.C. Fu & G.T. Poppe, 2016 - n. sp.
- Homalopoma profundum S.-I. Huang, C.C. Fu & G.T. Poppe, 2016 - n. sp.
- Homalopoma tagaroae S.-I. Huang, C.C. Fu & G.T. Poppe, 2016 - n. sp.
- Homalopoma unicum S.-I. Huang, C.C. Fu & G.T. Poppe, 2016 - n. sp.
- Homalopoma zephyrium S.-I. Huang, C.C. Fu & G.T. Poppe, 2016 - n. sp.
- Magnihomalopoma G.T. Poppe, S.P. Tagaro & S.-I. Huang, 2023 - n. gen.
- Magnihomalopoma aurorae G.T. Poppe, S.P. Tagaro & S.-I. Huang, 2023 - n. sp.
- Magnihomalopoma bernadettae G.T. Poppe, S.P. Tagaro & S.-I. Huang, 2023 - n. sp.
- Magnihomalopoma coltrorum G.T. Poppe, S.P. Tagaro & S.-I. Huang, 2023 - n. sp.
- Magnihomalopoma docxae G.T. Poppe, S.P. Tagaro & S.-I. Huang, 2023 - n. sp.
- Magnihomalopoma guadeloupense G.T. Poppe, S.P. Tagaro & S.-I. Huang, 2023 - n. sp.
- Magnihomalopoma jujubinum G.T. Poppe, S.P. Tagaro & S.-I. Huang, 2023 - n. sp.
- Magnihomalopoma jujubinum f. eboreus G.T. Poppe, S.P. Tagaro & S.-I. Huang, 2023 - n. sp.
- Magnihomalopoma kennethwyei G.T. Poppe, S.P. Tagaro & S.-I. Huang, 2023 - n. sp.
- Magnihomalopoma maartensei G.T. Poppe, S.P. Tagaro & S.-I. Huang, 2023 - n. sp.
- Magnihomalopoma magnificum G.T. Poppe, S.P. Tagaro & S.-I. Huang, 2023 - n. sp.
- Magnihomalopoma salisburyi G.T. Poppe, S.P. Tagaro & S.-I. Huang, 2023 - n. sp.
- Magnihomalopoma schwanki G.T. Poppe, S.P. Tagaro & S.-I. Huang, 2023 - n. sp.
- Magnihomalopoma sealarki G.T. Poppe, S.P. Tagaro & S.-I. Huang, 2023 - n. sp.
- Magnihomalopoma solomonense G.T. Poppe, S.P. Tagaro & S.-I. Huang, 2023 - n. sp.
- Magnihomalopoma tenebrismundi G.T. Poppe, S.P. Tagaro & S.-I. Huang, 2023 - n. sp.
- Magnihomalopoma trochiforme G.T. Poppe, S.P. Tagaro & S.-I. Huang, 2023 - n. sp.
- Margaritacollonia G.T. Poppe, S.P. Tagaro & S.-I. Huang, 2023 - n. gen.
- Margaritacollonia aurea G.T. Poppe, S.P. Tagaro & S.-I. Huang, 2023 - n. sp.
- Margaritacollonia faugereae G.T. Poppe, S.P. Tagaro & S.-I. Huang, 2023 - n. sp.
- Margaritacollonia mirabilis G.T. Poppe, S.P. Tagaro & S.-I. Huang, 2023 - n. sp.
- Margaritacollonia peculiaris G.T. Poppe, S.P. Tagaro & S.-I. Huang, 2023 - n. sp.
- Margaritacollonia plana G.T. Poppe, S.P. Tagaro & S.-I. Huang, 2023 - n. sp.
- Margaritacollonia pseudopeculiaris G.T. Poppe, S.P. Tagaro & S.-I. Huang, 2023 - n. sp.
- Margaritacollonia rara G.T. Poppe, S.P. Tagaro & S.-I. Huang, 2023 - n. sp.
- Microcollonia G.T. Poppe, S.P. Tagaro & S.-I. Huang, 2023 - n. gen.
- Neocollonia comorensis G.T. Poppe, S.P. Tagaro & S.-I. Huang, 2023 - n. sp.
- Neocollonia diversicolor G.T. Poppe, S.P. Tagaro & S.-I. Huang, 2023 - n. sp.
- Neocollonia kantori G.T. Poppe, S.P. Tagaro & S.-I. Huang, 2023 - n. sp.
- Neocollonia mcleani G.T. Poppe, S.P. Tagaro & S.-I. Huang, 2023 - n. sp.
- Neocollonia roseobrunneis G.T. Poppe, S.P. Tagaro & S.-I. Huang, 2023 - n. sp.
- Neocollonia splendida G.T. Poppe, S.P. Tagaro & S.-I. Huang, 2023 - n. sp.
- Orbiscollonia G.T. Poppe, S.P. Tagaro & S.-I. Huang, 2023 - n. gen.
- Orbiscollonia mixta G.T. Poppe, S.P. Tagaro & S.-I. Huang, 2023 - n. sp.
- Orbiscollonia pacifica G.T. Poppe, S.P. Tagaro & S.-I. Huang, 2023 - n. sp.
- Phanerolepida marquisensis G.T. Poppe, S.P. Tagaro & S.-I. Huang, 2023 - n. sp.
- Phanerolepida tahitensis G.T. Poppe, S.P. Tagaro & S.-I. Huang, 2023 - n. sp.
- Pictacollonia G.T. Poppe, S.P. Tagaro & S.-I. Huang, 2023 - n. gen.
- Pictacollonia boucheti G.T. Poppe, S.P. Tagaro & S.-I. Huang, 2023 - n. sp.
- Pictacollonia ellenstrongae G.T. Poppe, S.P. Tagaro & S.-I. Huang, 2023 - n. sp.
- Pictacollonia fijiensis G.T. Poppe, S.P. Tagaro & S.-I. Huang, 2023 - n. sp.
- Pictacollonia hardyi G.T. Poppe, S.P. Tagaro & S.-I. Huang, 2023 - n. sp.
- Pictacollonia julieae G.T. Poppe, S.P. Tagaro & S.-I. Huang, 2023 - n. sp.
- Pictacollonia nebulosa G.T. Poppe, S.P. Tagaro & S.-I. Huang, 2023 - n. sp.
- Pictacollonia ornamentaria G.T. Poppe, S.P. Tagaro & S.-I. Huang, 2023 - n. sp.
- Pictacollonia pseudotagaroae G.T. Poppe, S.P. Tagaro & S.-I. Huang, 2023 - n. sp.
- Pictacollonia salmonis G.T. Poppe, S.P. Tagaro & S.-I. Huang, 2023 - n. sp.
- Planacollonista G.T. Poppe, S.P. Tagaro & S.-I. Huang, 2023 - n. gen.
- Planacollonista arneghysi G.T. Poppe, S.P. Tagaro & S.-I. Huang, 2023 - n. sp.
- Planasolidum G.T. Poppe, S.P. Tagaro & S.-I. Huang, 2023 - n. gen.
- Planasolidum kaiense G.T. Poppe, S.P. Tagaro & S.-I. Huang, 2023 - n. sp.
- Planasolidum sanjorge G.T. Poppe, S.P. Tagaro & S.-I. Huang, 2023 - n. sp.
- Planasolidum santaisabelae G.T. Poppe, S.P. Tagaro & S.-I. Huang, 2023 - n. sp.
- Pulchracollonia G.T. Poppe, S.P. Tagaro & S.-I. Huang, 2023 - n. gen.
- Pulchracollonia pulchrarosea G.T. Poppe, S.P. Tagaro & S.-I. Huang, 2023 - n. sp.
- Pulchracollonia tavianii G.T. Poppe, S.P. Tagaro & S.-I. Huang, 2023 - n. sp.
- Pulchracollonia unica G.T. Poppe, S.P. Tagaro & S.-I. Huang, 2023 - n. sp.
- Pulchracollonia visayaensis G.T. Poppe, S.P. Tagaro & S.-I. Huang, 2023 - n. sp.
- Squamahomalopoma G.T. Poppe, S.P. Tagaro & S.-I. Huang, 2023 - n. gen.
- Thermocollonia choiseuli G.T. Poppe, S.P. Tagaro & S.-I. Huang, 2023 - n. sp.
- Thermocollonia dabfari G.T. Poppe, S.P. Tagaro & S.-I. Huang, 2023 - n. sp.
- Thermocollonia escondida G.T. Poppe, S.P. Tagaro & S.-I. Huang, 2023 - n. sp.
- Thermocollonia lutiamans G.T. Poppe, S.P. Tagaro & S.-I. Huang, 2023 - n. sp.
- Thermocollonia malaitae G.T. Poppe, S.P. Tagaro & S.-I. Huang, 2023 - n. sp.
- Thermocolloniinae G.T. Poppe, S.P. Tagaro & S.-I. Huang, 2023 - n. subfam.
- Triangularis G.T. Poppe, S.P. Tagaro & S.-I. Huang, 2023 - n. gen.
- Triangularis kaokae G.T. Poppe, S.P. Tagaro & S.-I. Huang, 2023 - n. sp.
- Triangularis sancristobali G.T. Poppe, S.P. Tagaro & S.-I. Huang, 2023 - n. sp.
- Trochicollonia G.T. Poppe, S.P. Tagaro & S.-I. Huang, 2023 - n. gen.
- Trochicollonia gregoi G.T. Poppe, S.P. Tagaro & S.-I. Huang, 2023 - n. sp.
- Trochicollonia sloofae G.T. Poppe, S.P. Tagaro & S.-I. Huang, 2023 - n. sp.
- Trochicollonia vauquelini G.T. Poppe, S.P. Tagaro & S.-I. Huang, 2023 - n. sp.

COLUMBELLIDAE

- Mitrella fineti G.T. Poppe & S.P. Tagaro, 2010 - n. sp.

CONIDAE

- Conus admirationis G.T. Poppe & S.P. Tagaro, 2015 - n. sp.
- Conus beatrix M. Tenorio, G.T. Poppe & S.P. Tagaro, 2007 - n. sp.
- Conus escondidai G.T. Poppe & S.P. Tagaro, 2005 - n. sp.
- Conus frausseni M. Tenorio & G.T. Poppe, 2004 - n. sp.
- Conus gattegnoi G.T. Poppe & S.P. Tagaro, 2017 - n. sp.
- Conus geeraertsi G.T. Poppe & S.P. Tagaro, 2017 - n. sp.
- Conus glorioceanus G.T. Poppe & S.P. Tagaro, 2009 - n. sp.
- Conus grohi M. Tenorio & G.T. Poppe, 2004 - n. sp.
- Conus nobilis abbai G.T. Poppe & S.P. Tagaro, 2011 - n. subsp.
- Conus olangoensis G.T. Poppe & S.P. Tagaro, 2017 - n. sp.
- Conus pseudonivifer A. Monteiro, M.J. Tenorio & G.T. Poppe, 2004 - n. sp.
- Conus recluzianus simanoki M. Tenorio, G.T. Poppe & S.P. Tagaro, 2007 - n. subsp.
- Conus scottjordani G.T. Poppe, E. Monnier & S.P. Tagaro, 2012 - n. sp.
- Conus terryni M. Tenorio & G.T. Poppe, 2004 - n. sp.
- Phasmoconus sogodensis X forgot G.T. Poppe, E. Monnier & S.P. Tagaro, 2012 - n. sp.

COSTELLARIIDAE

- Ceratoxancus lorenzi (G.T. Poppe, S.P. Tagaro & J. Sarino, 2012) - n. sp.
- Pusia voncoseli G.T. Poppe, S.P. Tagaro & R. Salisbury, 2009 - n. sp.
- Vexillum baeri G.T. Poppe, S.P. Tagaro & R. Salisbury, 2009 - n. sp.
- Vexillum chinoi G.T. Poppe, 2008 - n. sp.
- Vexillum dautzenbergi G.T. Poppe, E. Suduiraut & S.P. Tagaro, 2006 - n. sp.
- Vexillum geronimae G.T. Poppe, S.P. Tagaro & R. Salisbury, 2009 - n. sp.
- Vexillum giselae G.T. Poppe, S.P. Tagaro & R. Salisbury, 2009 - n. sp.
- Vexillum gloriae G.T. Poppe, S.P. Tagaro & R. Salisbury, 2009 - n. sp.
- Vexillum jeciliae G.T. Poppe, S.P. Tagaro & R. Salisbury, 2009 - n. sp.
- Vexillum joliveti G.T. Poppe & S.P. Tagaro, 2006 - n. sp.
- Vexillum leyteensis G.T. Poppe, S.P. Tagaro & R. Salisbury, 2009 - n. sp.
- Vexillum luigiraybaudii G.T. Poppe, E. Suduiraut & S.P. Tagaro, 2006 - n. sp.
- Vexillum monalizae G.T. Poppe, E. Suduiraut & S.P. Tagaro, 2006 - n. sp.
- Vexillum monsecourorum G.T. Poppe, E. Suduiraut & S.P. Tagaro, 2006 - n. sp.
- Vexillum pedroi G.T. Poppe & S.P. Tagaro, 2006 - n. sp.
- Vexillum pelaezi G.T. Poppe, S.P. Tagaro & R. Salisbury, 2009 - n. sp.
- Vexillum philtwoi G.T. Poppe, S.P. Tagaro & R. Salisbury, 2009 - n. sp.
- Vexillum praefulguratum G.T. Poppe, 2008 - n. sp.
- Vexillum renatoi G.T. Poppe, S.P. Tagaro & R. Salisbury, 2009 - n. sp.
- Vexillum ronnyi G.T. Poppe, S.P. Tagaro & R. Salisbury, 2009 - n. sp.
- Vexillum strnadi G.T. Poppe & S.P. Tagaro, 2010 - n. sp.
- Vexillum thorssoni G.T. Poppe, E. Suduiraut & S.P. Tagaro, 2006 - n. sp.
- Visaya G.T. Poppe, E. Suduiraut & S.P. Tagaro, 2006 - n. gen.
- Visaya rosenbergi G.T. Poppe, E. Suduiraut & S.P. Tagaro, 2006 - n. sp.

CROSSEOLIDAE

- Crossea victori G.T. Poppe, S.P. Tagaro & P. Stahlschmidt, 2015 - n. sp.

CUSPIDARIIDAE

- Cuspidaria tomricei G.T. Poppe & S.P. Tagaro, 2016 - n. sp.
- Cuspidaria vicdani G.T. Poppe & S.P. Tagaro, 2016 - n. sp.

CYPRAEIDAE

- Contradusta lapillus G.T. Poppe, S.P. Tagaro & K. Groh, 2013 - n. sp.
- Cypraea hungerfordi lovetha G.T. Poppe, S.P. Tagaro & J. Buijse, 2005. - n. subsp.
- Cypraea jandeprezi G.T. Poppe & P. Martin, 1997 - n. sp.
- Cypraea lefaiti P. Martin & G.T. Poppe, 1989 - n. sp.
- Cypraea leucodon forma escotoi G.T. Poppe, 2004 - n. form.

DIPLOMMATINIDAE

- Diancta crookshanksi G.T. Poppe, S.P. Tagaro & J. Sarino, 2015 - n. sp.
- Diplommatina lourinae G.T. Poppe, S.P. Tagaro & J. Sarino, 2015 - n. sp.

DRILLIIDAE

- Cerodrillia jerrywallsi G.T. Poppe, S.P. Tagaro & Y. Goto, 2018 - n. sp.
- Clavus angulatus P. Stahlschmidt, G.T. Poppe & S.P. Tagaro, 2018 - n. sp.
- Clavus dolichurus P. Stahlschmidt, G.T. Poppe & S.P. Tagaro, 2018 - n. sp.
- Clavus isowai G.T. Poppe, S.P. Tagaro & Y. Goto, 2018 - n. sp.
- Clavus minutissimus P. Stahlschmidt, G.T. Poppe & S.P. Tagaro, 2018 - n. sp.
- Clavus particolor P. Stahlschmidt, G.T. Poppe & S.P. Tagaro, 2018 - n. sp.
- Clavus similis P. Stahlschmidt, G.T. Poppe & S.P. Tagaro, 2018 - n. sp.
- Splendrillia bozzettii P. Stahlschmidt, G.T. Poppe & S.P. Tagaro, 2018 - n. sp.
- Tylotiella cloveri G.T. Poppe, S.P. Tagaro & Y. Goto, 2018 - n. sp.
- Tylotiella idae G.T. Poppe, S.P. Tagaro & Y. Goto, 2018 - n. sp.

EPITONIIDAE

- Alora turbinata G.T. Poppe, 2008 - n. sp.
- Cirsotrema browni G.T. Poppe, 2008 - n. sp.
- Dannevigena zografakisi (G.T. Poppe, S.P. Tagaro & L. Brown, 2006) - n. sp.

FASCIOLARIIDAE

- Fusinus williami G.T. Poppe & S.P. Tagaro, 2006 - n. sp.

FISSURELLIDAE

- Cosmetalepas massieri G.T. Poppe, S.P. Tagaro & J. Sarino, 2011 - n. sp.
- Cranopsis floris G.T. Poppe, S.P. Tagaro & P. Stahlschmidt, 2015 - n. sp.
- Diodora magnifica G.T. Poppe & S.P. Tagaro, 2020 - n. sp.
- Diodora namibiensis G.T. Poppe, S.P. Tagaro & J. Sarino, 2011 - n. sp.
- Diodora occultata G.T. Poppe & S.P. Tagaro, 2020 - n. sp.
- Emarginella aurea G.T. Poppe & S.P. Tagaro, 2020 - n. sp.
- Emarginella dharmai G.T. Poppe & S.P. Tagaro, 2020 - n. sp.
- Emarginella survicapi G.T. Poppe & S.P. Tagaro, 2020 - n. sp.
- Emarginula annielangleitae G.T. Poppe & S.P. Tagaro, 2020 - n. sp.
- Emarginula balicasagensis G.T. Poppe & S.P. Tagaro, 2020 - n. sp.
- Emarginula boucheti G.T. Poppe & S.P. Tagaro, 2020 - n. sp.
- Emarginula circumalbum G.T. Poppe & S.P. Tagaro, 2020 - n. sp.
- Emarginula colipanoae G.T. Poppe & S.P. Tagaro, 2020 - n. sp.
- Emarginula delonguevilleae G.T. Poppe & S.P. Tagaro, 2020 - n. sp.
- Emarginula gigantea G.T. Poppe, 2008 - n. sp.
- Emarginula gustavi G.T. Poppe & S.P. Tagaro, 2020 - n. sp.
- Emarginula liuzzii G.T. Poppe & S.P. Tagaro, 2020 - n. sp.
- Emarginula mactanensis G.T. Poppe & S.P. Tagaro, 2020 - n. sp.
- Emarginula margarita G.T. Poppe & S.P. Tagaro, 2020 - n. sp.
- Emarginula philippinensis G.T. Poppe & S.P. Tagaro, 2020 - n. sp.
- Emarginula quadratum G.T. Poppe & S.P. Tagaro, 2020 - n. sp.
- Emarginula viridibrunnis G.T. Poppe & S.P. Tagaro, 2020 - n. sp.
- Emarginula viridis G.T. Poppe & S.P. Tagaro, 2020 - n. sp.
- Emarginula yangeorum G.T. Poppe & S.P. Tagaro, 2020 - n. sp.
- Fissurellidea ahuirorum G.T. Poppe & S.P. Tagaro, 2020 - n. sp.
- Lucapinella henkdekkeri G.T. Poppe & S.P. Tagaro, 2020 - n. sp.
- Macroschisma rubra G.T. Poppe, S.P. Tagaro & P. Stahlschmidt, 2015 - n. sp.
- Puncturella stellasplendida G.T. Poppe & S.P. Tagaro, 2020 - n. sp.
- Rimula escondida G.T. Poppe & S.P. Tagaro, 2020 - n. sp.
- Rimula navis G.T. Poppe & S.P. Tagaro, 2020 - n. sp.

GLYCYMERIDIDAE

- Tucetona saggiecoheni G.T. Poppe, S.P. Tagaro & P. Stahlschmidt, 2015 - n. sp.

HALOCERATIDAE

- Zygoceras okutanii G.T. Poppe & S.P. Tagaro, 2010 - n. sp.

HARPIDAE

- Morum fatimae G.T. Poppe & T. Brulet, 1999 - n. sp.

HORAICLAVIDAE

- Asperosculptura B. Ardovini, G.T. Poppe & S.P. Tagaro, 2021 - n. gen.
- Asperosculptura aikeni B. Ardovini, G.T. Poppe & S.P. Tagaro, 2021 - n. sp.
- Asperosculptura exquisita B. Ardovini, G.T. Poppe & S.P. Tagaro, 2021 - n. sp.
- Asperosculptura monteiroi B. Ardovini, G.T. Poppe & S.P. Tagaro, 2021 - n. sp.
- Horaiclavus julieae P. Stahlschmidt, G.T. Poppe & S.P. Tagaro, 2018 - n. sp.
- Horaiclavus pulchellus P. Stahlschmidt, G.T. Poppe & S.P. Tagaro, 2018 - n. sp.

LIMIDAE

- Acesta vitrina G.T. Poppe, S.P. Tagaro & P. Stahlschmidt, 2015 - n. sp.

MANGELIIDAE

- Macteola biconica P. Stahlschmidt, G.T. Poppe & S.P. Tagaro, 2015 - n. sp.

MITRIDAE

- Cancilla apprimapex G.T. Poppe, S.P. Tagaro & R. Salisbury, 2009 - n. sp.
- Cancilla fibula G.T. Poppe, S.P. Tagaro & R. Salisbury, 2009 - n. sp.
- Cancilla turneri G.T. Poppe, S.P. Tagaro & R. Salisbury, 2009 - n. sp.
- Mitra aliciae G.T. Poppe, S.P. Tagaro & R. Salisbury, 2009 - n. sp.
- Mitra arnoldeyasi G.T. Poppe & S.P. Tagaro, 2010 - n. sp.
- Mitra baerorum G.T. Poppe & S.P. Tagaro, 2010 - n. sp.
- Mitra barbieri G.T. Poppe & S.P. Tagaro, 2006 - n. sp.
- Mitra christinae G.T. Poppe, 2008 - n. sp.
- Mitra cuyosae G.T. Poppe, 2008 - n. sp.
- Mitra edgari G.T. Poppe, S.P. Tagaro & R. Salisbury, 2009 - n. sp.
- Mitra gourgueti G.T. Poppe, R. Salisbury & S.P. Tagaro, 2015 - n. sp.
- Mitra honkeri G.T. Poppe, S.P. Tagaro & R. Salisbury, 2009 - n. sp.
- Mitra kantori G.T. Poppe, S.P. Tagaro & R. Salisbury, 2009 - n. sp.
- Mitra kilburni G.T. Poppe, S.P. Tagaro & R. Salisbury, 2009 - n. sp.
- Mitra lorenzi G.T. Poppe & S.P. Tagaro, 2006 - n. sp.
- Mitra magnifica G.T. Poppe & S.P. Tagaro, 2006 - n. sp.
- Mitra margaritatus G.T. Poppe, S.P. Tagaro & R. Salisbury, 2009 - n. sp.
- Mitra oliverai G.T. Poppe, 2008 - n. sp.
- Mitra perdulca G.T. Poppe, S.P. Tagaro & R. Salisbury, 2009 - n. sp.
- Mitra sarinoae G.T. Poppe, 2008 - n. sp.
- Mitra sarmientoi G.T. Poppe, 2008 - n. sp.
- Mitra semperi G.T. Poppe, S.P. Tagaro & R. Salisbury, 2009 - n. sp.
- Mitra strongae G.T. Poppe, S.P. Tagaro & R. Salisbury, 2009 - n. sp.
- Mitra tagaroae G.T. Poppe, 2008 - n. sp.
- Mitra terryni G.T. Poppe, 2008 - n. sp.
- Mitra wareni G.T. Poppe, S.P. Tagaro & R. Salisbury, 2009 - n. sp.
- Mitra willani G.T. Poppe, S.P. Tagaro & R. Salisbury, 2009 - n. sp.
- Neocancilla hartorum G.T. Poppe, R. Salisbury & S.P. Tagaro, 2015 - n. sp.
- Scabricola geigeri G.T. Poppe, S.P. Tagaro & R. Salisbury, 2009 - n. sp.
- Scabricola martini G.T. Poppe & S.P. Tagaro, 2006 - n. sp.
- Scabricola petiti G.T. Poppe & S.P. Tagaro, 2006 - n. sp.
- Subcancilla baisei G.T. Poppe, S.P. Tagaro & R. Salisbury, 2009 - n. sp.
- Subcancilla bellulavaria A. Dekkers, M. Herrmann, G.T. Poppe & S.P. Tagaro, 2014 - n. sp.
- Subcancilla philpoppei G.T. Poppe, S.P. Tagaro & R. Salisbury, 2009 - n. sp.
- Subcancilla pugnaxa G.T. Poppe, S.P. Tagaro & R. Salisbury, 2009 - n. sp.
- Subcancilla ruberorbis A. Dekkers, M. Herrmann, G.T. Poppe & S.P. Tagaro, 2014 - n. sp.
- Subcancilla rufogyratus G.T. Poppe, S.P. Tagaro & R. Salisbury, 2009 - n. sp.
- Subcancilla zetema A. Dekkers, M. Herrmann, G.T. Poppe & S.P. Tagaro, 2014 - n. sp.

NATICIDAE

- Tanea hollmanni G.T. Poppe, S.P. Tagaro & P. Stahlschmidt, 2015 - n. sp.

NERITIDAE

- Neripteron leyteensis G.T. Poppe & S.P. Tagaro, 2023 - n. sp.

NUCULANIDAE

- Nuculana sufficientia G.T. Poppe & S.P. Tagaro, 2016 - n. sp.

NUCULIDAE

- Nucula crystallina G.T. Poppe, S.P. Tagaro & P. Stahlschmidt, 2015 - n. sp.

NYSTIELLIDAE

- Iphitus boucheti G.T. Poppe & S.P. Tagaro, 2016 - n. sp.
- Iphitus escondida G.T. Poppe & S.P. Tagaro, 2016 - n. sp.

PHASIANELLIDAE

- Tricolia delicata G.T. Poppe, S.P. Tagaro & Y. Goto, 2018 - n. sp.

PICKWORTHIIDAE

- Ampullosansonia renephilippei G.T. Poppe, S.P. Tagaro & Y. Goto, 2018 - n. sp.

PLANAXIDAE

- Supplanaxis leyteensis G.T. Poppe, S.P. Tagaro & P. Stahlschmidt, 2015 - n. sp.

PLEUROTOMARIIDAE

- Bayerotrochus boucheti P. Anseeuw & G.T. Poppe, 2001 - n. sp.
- Bayerotrochus philpoppei P. Anseeuw, G.T. Poppe & Y. Goto, 2006 - n. sp.

PSEUDOMELATOMIDAE

- Inquisitor frausseni P. Stahlschmidt, G.T. Poppe & S.P. Tagaro, 2018 - n. sp.
- Inquisitor harrymonti P. Stahlschmidt, G.T. Poppe & S.P. Tagaro, 2018 - n. sp.
- Inquisitor lorenzi P. Stahlschmidt, G.T. Poppe & S.P. Tagaro, 2018 - n. sp.
- Inquisitor mactanensis P. Stahlschmidt, G.T. Poppe & S.P. Tagaro, 2018 - n. sp.
- Inquisitor michaelmonti P. Stahlschmidt, G.T. Poppe & S.P. Tagaro, 2018 - n. sp.
- Inquisitor millepunctatus P. Stahlschmidt, G.T. Poppe & S.P. Tagaro, 2018 - n. sp.
- Otitoma aureolineata P. Stahlschmidt, G.T. Poppe & S.P. Tagaro, 2018 - n. sp.
- Otitoma jennyae P. Stahlschmidt, G.T. Poppe & S.P. Tagaro, 2018 - n. sp.
- Otitoma pictolabra P. Stahlschmidt, G.T. Poppe & S.P. Tagaro, 2018 - n. sp.
- Otitoma porcellana P. Stahlschmidt, G.T. Poppe & S.P. Tagaro, 2018 - n. sp.
- Otitoma wiedricki P. Stahlschmidt, G.T. Poppe & S.P. Tagaro, 2018 - n. sp.

PYRAMIDELLIDAE

- Cingulina aikeni G.T. Poppe, S.P. Tagaro & Y. Goto, 2018 - n. sp.
- Eurathea liletae (G.T. Poppe, S.P. Tagaro & P. Stahlschmidt, 2015) - n. sp.
- Mumiola myrnae G.T. Poppe, S.P. Tagaro & P. Stahlschmidt, 2015 - n. sp.
- Pyramidella guardiarioorum G.T. Poppe, S.P. Tagaro & P. Stahlschmidt, 2015 - n. sp.
- Turbonilla escondida G.T. Poppe, S.P. Tagaro & P. Stahlschmidt, 2015 - n. sp.

RAPHITOMIDAE

- Daphnella areolata P. Stahlschmidt, G.T. Poppe & M. Chino, 2014 - n. sp.
- Daphnella floridula P. Stahlschmidt, G.T. Poppe & M. Chino, 2014 - n. sp.
- Daphnella graminea P. Stahlschmidt, G.T. Poppe & M. Chino, 2014 - n. sp.
- Daphnella janae P. Stahlschmidt, G.T. Poppe & M. Chino, 2014 - n. sp.
- Daphnella magnifica P. Stahlschmidt, G.T. Poppe & M. Chino, 2014 - n. sp.
- Daphnella pulchrelineata P. Stahlschmidt, G.T. Poppe & M. Chino, 2014 - n. sp.
- Daphnella tagaroae P. Stahlschmidt, G.T. Poppe & M. Chino, 2014 - named Sheila
- Gymnobela bululi P. Stahlschmidt, G.T. Poppe & S.P. Tagaro, 2018 - n. sp.
- Kuroshiodaphne aurea P. Stahlschmidt, G.T. Poppe & S.P. Tagaro, 2018 - n. sp.
- Tritonoturris difficilis P. Stahlschmidt, G.T. Poppe & S.P. Tagaro, 2018 - n. sp.
- Tritonoturris sottoae P. Stahlschmidt, G.T. Poppe & S.P. Tagaro, 2018 - n. sp.

RISSOIDAE

- Alvania nix G.T. Poppe, S.P. Tagaro & Y. Goto, 2018 - n. sp.
- Rissoa olangoensis G.T. Poppe, S.P. Tagaro & P. Stahlschmidt, 2015 - n. sp.

SEGUENZIIDAE

- Ancistrobasis largoi G.T. Poppe, S.P. Tagaro & H. Dekker, 2006 - n. sp.
- Calliobasis gemmata G.T. Poppe, S.P. Tagaro & P. Stahlschmidt, 2015 - n. sp.
- Calliobasis lapulapui G.T. Poppe, S.P. Tagaro & H. Dekker, 2006 - n. sp.
- Calliobasis magellani G.T. Poppe, S.P. Tagaro & H. Dekker, 2006 - n. sp.
- Fluxinella vitrina G.T. Poppe, S.P. Tagaro & P. Stahlschmidt, 2015 - n. sp.
- Halystina globulus G.T. Poppe, S.P. Tagaro & H. Dekker, 2006 - n. sp.
- Seguenzia balicasagensis G.T. Poppe, S.P. Tagaro & H. Dekker, 2006 - n. sp.
- Seguenzia beloni G.T. Poppe, S.P. Tagaro & H. Dekker, 2006 - n. sp.
- Seguenzia dabfari G.T. Poppe, S.P. Tagaro & H. Dekker, 2006 - n. sp.
- Seguenzia keikoae G.T. Poppe, S.P. Tagaro & H. Dekker, 2006 - n. sp.
- Seguenzia trochiformis G.T. Poppe, S.P. Tagaro & H. Dekker, 2006 - n. sp.
- Seguenzia elegantissima G.T. Poppe, S.P. Tagaro & H. Dekker, 2006 - n. sp.
- Visayaseguenzia G.T. Poppe, S.P. Tagaro & H. Dekker, 2006 - n. gen.
- Visayaseguenzia cumingi G.T. Poppe, S.P. Tagaro & H. Dekker, 2006 - n. sp.
- Visayaseguenzia maestratii G.T. Poppe, S.P. Tagaro & H. Dekker, 2006 - n. sp.

SERAPHIDAE

- Terebellum hubrechti G.T. Poppe & S.P. Tagaro, 2016 - n. sp.

SOLARIELLIDAE

- Bathymophila tenorioi G.T. Poppe, S.P. Tagaro & H. Dekker, 2006 - n. sp.
- Microgaza gotoi G.T. Poppe, S.P. Tagaro & H. Dekker, 2006 - n. sp.
- Minolia condei G.T. Poppe, S.P. Tagaro & H. Dekker, 2006 - n. sp.
- Minolia segersi G.T. Poppe, S.P. Tagaro & H. Dekker, 2006 - n. sp.
- Minolia tabakotanii G.T. Poppe, S.P. Tagaro & H. Dekker, 2006 - n. sp.
- Solariella pygmaea G.T. Poppe, S.P. Tagaro & H. Dekker, 2006 - n. sp.
- Solariella sanjuanensis G.T. Poppe, S.P. Tagaro & H. Dekker, 2006 - n. sp.
- Zetela dedonderorum G.T. Poppe, S.P. Tagaro & H. Dekker, 2006 - n. sp.

SPONDYLIDAE

- Spondylus gloriosus visayensis G.T. Poppe & S.P. Tagaro, 2010 - n. subsp.

STOMATELLIDAE

- Pseudostomatella martini G.T. Poppe, S.P. Tagaro & H. Dekker, 2006 - n. sp.
- Stomatella capieri G.T. Poppe, S.P. Tagaro & H. Dekker, 2006 - n. sp.
- Stomatella gattegnoi G.T. Poppe, S.P. Tagaro & H. Dekker, 2006 - n. sp.
- Stomatella monteiroi G.T. Poppe, S.P. Tagaro & H. Dekker, 2006 - n. sp.

TEREBRIDAE

- Cinguloterebra neglecta G.T. Poppe, S.P. Tagaro & Y. Terryn, 2009 - n. sp.
- Cinguloterebra punctum G.T. Poppe, S.P. Tagaro & Y. Terryn, 2009 - n. sp.
- Clathroterebra joelbartschi G.T. Poppe, S.P. Tagaro & Y. Goto, 2018 - n. sp.
- Myurella okudai G.T. Poppe, S.P. Tagaro & Y. Goto, 2018 - n. sp.
- Pristiterebra frausseni G.T. Poppe, S.P. Tagaro & Y. Terryn, 2009 - n. sp.
- Terebra guphilae G.T. Poppe, S.P. Tagaro & Y. Terryn, 2009 - n. sp.
- Terebra terryni G.T. Poppe, S.P. Tagaro & Y. Goto, 2018 - n. sp.

TORNIDAE

- Lophocochlias escondidus G.T. Poppe, S.P. Tagaro & Y. Goto, 2018 - n. sp.

TRIMUSCULIDAE

- Trimusculus escondidus G.T. Poppe & K. Groh, 2008 - n. sp.

TROCHIDAE

- Cantharidus nolfi G.T. Poppe, S.P. Tagaro & H. Dekker, 2006 - n. sp.
- Cantharidus sendersi G.T. Poppe, S.P. Tagaro & H. Dekker, 2006 - n. sp.
- Clanculus boyeti G.T. Poppe, S.P. Tagaro & H. Dekker, 2006 - n. sp.
- Clanculus buijsei G.T. Poppe, S.P. Tagaro & H. Dekker, 2006 - n. sp.
- Clanculus escondidus G.T. Poppe & S.P. Tagaro & C. Vilvens, 2009 - n. sp.
- Clanculus scotti G.T. Poppe, S.P. Tagaro & H. Dekker, 2006 - n. sp.
- Clanculus simoni G.T. Poppe, S.P. Tagaro & H. Dekker, 2006 - n. sp.
- Ethalia catharinae G.T. Poppe, S.P. Tagaro & H. Dekker, 2006 - n. sp.
- Gibbula eikoae G.T. Poppe, S.P. Tagaro & H. Dekker, 2006 - n. sp.
- Gibbula houarti G.T. Poppe, S.P. Tagaro & H. Dekker, 2006 - n. sp.
- Gibbula vanwalleghemi G.T. Poppe, S.P. Tagaro & H. Dekker, 2006 - n. sp.
- Jujubinus escondidus G.T. Poppe, S.P. Tagaro & H. Dekker, 2006 - n. sp.
- Jujubinus geographicus G.T. Poppe, S.P. Tagaro & H. Dekker, 2006 - n. sp.
- Jujubinus guphili G.T. Poppe, S.P. Tagaro & H. Dekker, 2006 - n. sp.
- Jujubinus hubrechti G.T. Poppe, S.P. Tagaro & H. Dekker, 2006 - n. sp.
- Pseudominolia tramieri G.T. Poppe, S.P. Tagaro & H. Dekker, 2006 - n. sp.
- Pseudotalopia rainesi G.T. Poppe, S.P. Tagaro & Y. Goto, 2018 - n. sp.
- Rossiteria pseudonucleolus G.T. Poppe, S.P. Tagaro & H. Dekker, 2006 - n. sp.
- Tectus magnificus G.T. Poppe, 2004 - n. sp.
- Vanitrochus geertsi G.T. Poppe, S.P. Tagaro & H. Dekker, 2006 - n. sp.

TURBINELLIDAE

- Enigmavasum G.T. Poppe & S.P. Tagaro, 2005 - n. gen.
- Enigmavasum enigmaticum G.T. Poppe & S.P. Tagaro, 2005 - n. sp.

TURBINIDAE

- Collonista kreipli G.T. Poppe, S.P. Tagaro & P. Stahlschmidt, 2015 - n. sp.
- Guildfordia superba G.T. Poppe, S.P. Tagaro & H. Dekker, 2005 - n. sp.

TURRIDAE

- Gemmula chinoi P. Stahlschmidt, G.T. Poppe & S.P. Tagaro, 2018 - n. sp.
- Gemmula contrasta P. Stahlschmidt, G.T. Poppe & S.P. Tagaro, 2018 - n. sp.
- Gemmula oliverai P. Stahlschmidt, G.T. Poppe & S.P. Tagaro, 2018 - n. sp.
- Lophiotoma hejingorum P. Stahlschmidt, G.T. Poppe & S.P. Tagaro, 2018 - n. sp.

VANIKORIDAE

- Macromphalus backeljaui G.T. Poppe, S.P. Tagaro & P. Stahlschmidt, 2015 - n. sp.
- Macromphalus magnificus G.T. Poppe & S.P. Tagaro, 2016 - n. sp.
- Macromphalus walkeri G.T. Poppe, S.P. Tagaro & P. Stahlschmidt, 2015 - n. sp.
- Zeradina fedosovi G.T. Poppe, S.P. Tagaro & Y. Goto, 2018 - n. sp.
- Zeradina parva G.T. Poppe, S.P. Tagaro & P. Stahlschmidt, 2015 - n. sp.
- Zeradina translucida G.T. Poppe, S.P. Tagaro & P. Stahlschmidt, 2015 - n. sp.

VENERIDAE

- Globivenus banaconensis G.T. Poppe, S.P. Tagaro & Y. Goto, 2018 - n. sp.

VOLUTIDAE

- Calliotectum egregium P. Bouchet & G.T. Poppe, 1995 - n. sp.
- Calliotectum piersonorum P. Bouchet & G.T. Poppe, 1995 - n. sp.
- Canalilyria P. Bail & G.T. Poppe, 2001 - n. subg.
- Cymbiola laminusa G.T. Poppe, S.P. Tagaro & P. Bail, 2011 - n. sp.
- Cymbiola scottjordani G.T. Poppe & S.P. Tagaro, 2005 - n. sp.
- Fusivoluta phyrrhostoma lemaitrei G.T. Poppe, 1992 - n. subsp.
- Indolyria P. Bail & G.T. Poppe, 2001 - n. subg.
- Livoniini P. Bail & G.T. Poppe, 2001 - n. tribe
- Lyria boholensis G.T. Poppe, 1987 - n. sp.
- Lyria brianoi G.T. Poppe, 1999 - n. sp.
- Lyria cloveriana gabryae G.T. Poppe, 1991 - n. subsp.
- Lyria exorata P. Bouchet & G.T. Poppe, 1988 - n. sp.
- Lyria habei jessicae P. Bail & G.T. Poppe, 2004 - n. sp.
- Lyria planicostata fijiensis P. Bail & G.T. Poppe, 2004 - n. subsp.
- Microlyria P. Bail & G.T. Poppe, 2001 - n. subg.
- Mitraelyria P. Bail & G.T. Poppe, 2001 - n. subg.
- Nannamoria gotoi G.T. Poppe, 1992 - n. sp.
- Notopeplum cossignanii G.T. Poppe, 1999 - n. sp.
- Notovoluta hoskensae G.T. Poppe, 1992 - n. sp.
- Notovolutini P. Bail & G.T. Poppe, 2001 - n. tribe
- Plicolyria P. Bail & G.T. Poppe, 2001 - n. subg.
- Simililyria P. Bail & G.T. Poppe, 2001 - n. subg.
- Alcithoe aillaudorum P. Bouchet & G.T. Poppe, 1988 - n. sp.
- Amoria rinkensi G.T. Poppe, 1986 - n. sp.
- Calliotectum dalli claydoni (G.T. Poppe, 1986) - n. subsp.
- Cymbiola houarti G.T. Poppe, 1985 - n. sp.
- Cymbiola intruderi G.T. Poppe, 1985 - n. sp.
- Livonia joerinkensi (G.T. Poppe, 1987) - n. sp.
- Lyria bondarevi P. Bail & G.T. Poppe, 2004 - n. sp.
- Lyria boucheti P. Bail & G.T. Poppe, 2004 - n. sp.
- Lyria guionneti G.T. Poppe & J. Conde, 2001 - n. sp.
- Lyria pauljohnsoni G.T. Poppe & Y. Terryn, 2002 - n. sp.
- Lyria planicostata grohi P. Bail & G.T. Poppe, 2004 - n. subsp.
