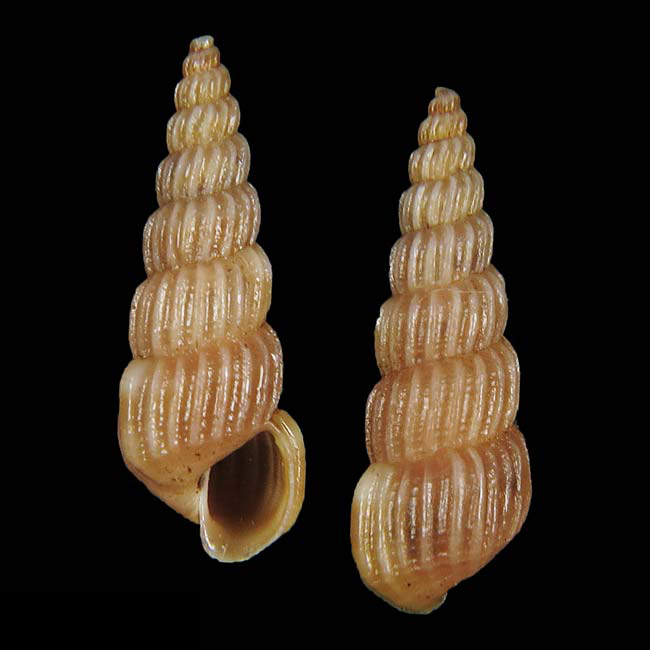

Scientific classification
- Kingdom: Animalia
- Phylum: Mollusca
- Class: Gastropoda
- Family: Pyramidellidae
- Genus: Turbonilla
- Species: T. escondida

Binomial name
- Turbonilla escondida Poppe, Tagaro & Stahlschmidt, 2015

= Turbonilla escondida =

Species of gastropod

Turbonilla escondida is a species of sea snail, a marine gastropod mollusk in the family Pyramidellidae.

== Original description ==
- Poppe G.T., Tagaro S.P. & Stahlschmidt P. (2015). New shelled molluscan species from the central Philippines I. Visaya. 4(3): 15-59.

page(s): 31, pl. 11 figs 4-5.
