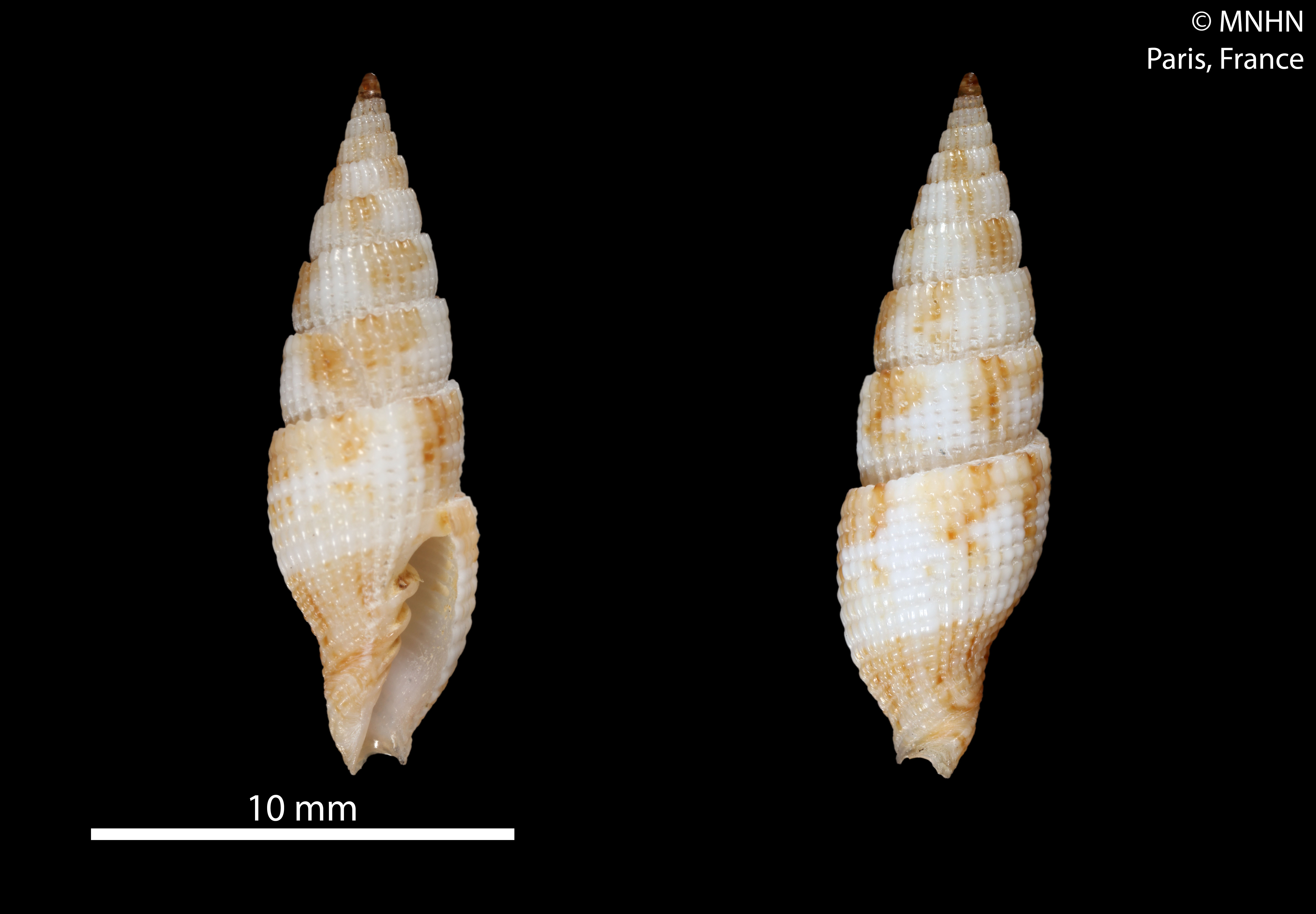
- Shell of Vexillum monsecourorum (paratype at MNHN, Paris)

Scientific classification
- Kingdom: Animalia
- Phylum: Mollusca
- Class: Gastropoda
- Subclass: Caenogastropoda
- Order: Neogastropoda
- Family: Costellariidae
- Genus: Vexillum
- Species: V. monsecourorum

Binomial name
- Vexillum monsecourorum Poppe, Guillot de Suduiraut & Tagaro, 2006

Synonyms
- Vexillum (Costellaria) monsecourorum Poppe, E. Guillot de Suduiraut & Tagaro, 2006

= Vexillum monsecourorum =

Species of gastropod

Vexillum monsecourorum is a species of small sea snail, marine gastropod mollusk in the family Costellariidae, the ribbed miters.

== Description ==
The length of the shell attains 15.7 mm.

== Distribution ==
This marine species occurs off the Philippines.
