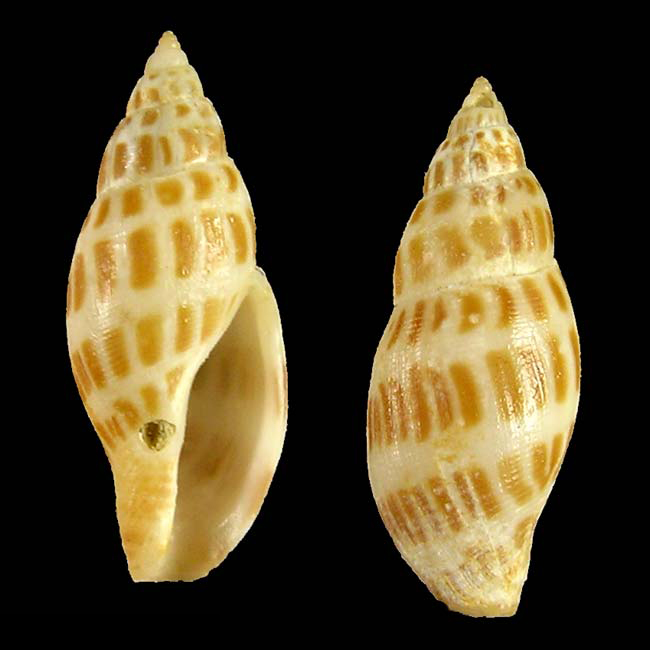
- Shell of Daphnella areolata (holotype in MNHN, Paris)

Scientific classification
- Kingdom: Animalia
- Phylum: Mollusca
- Class: Gastropoda
- Subclass: Caenogastropoda
- Order: Neogastropoda
- Superfamily: Conoidea
- Family: Raphitomidae
- Genus: Daphnella
- Species: D. areolata

Binomial name
- Daphnella areolata Stahlschmidt, Poppe & Chino, 2014

= Daphnella areolata =

Species of gastropod

Daphnella areolata is a species of sea snail, a marine gastropod mollusc in the aquatic family Raphitomidae.

== Description ==
The length of the shell varies between 9 mm and 12 mm.

== Distribution ==
This marine species occurs off Aliguay Island, Philippines.

== Bibliography ==
- Stahlschmidt P., Poppe G.T. & Chino M. (2014) Description of seven new Daphnella species from the Philippines (Gastropoda: Raphitomidae). Visaya 4(2): 29–38. [May 2014] page(s): 31.
