= Vexillum jeciliae =

Scientific classification
- Kingdom: Animalia
- Phylum: Mollusca
- Class: Gastropoda
- Subclass: Caenogastropoda
- Order: Neogastropoda
- Family: Costellariidae
- Genus: Vexillum
- Species: V. jeciliae

Binomial name
- Vexillum jeciliae Poppe, Tagaro & Salisbury, 2009

Species of gastropod

Vexillum jeciliae is a species of small sea snail, marine gastropod mollusk in the family Costellariidae, the ribbed miters.

== Description ==
The length of the shell attains 8.7 mm.

== Distribution ==
This marine species occurs off the Philippines.
