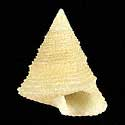
- apertural view of the shell of Calliostoma swinneni

Scientific classification
- Kingdom: Animalia
- Phylum: Mollusca
- Class: Gastropoda
- Subclass: Vetigastropoda
- Order: Trochida
- Family: Calliostomatidae
- Genus: Calliostoma
- Species: C. swinneni

Binomial name
- Calliostoma swinneni Poppe, Tagaro & Dekker, 2006

= Calliostoma swinneni =

Species of gastropod

Calliostoma swinneni is a species of marine gastropod mollusc in the family Calliostomatidae.

== Range of distribution ==
This species is endemic to the Philippines. It is found in Aliguay Island, Mindanao.

== Habitat ==
This top shell lives at depths of about 100 m.

== Shell description ==
The shape of the shell is high conical. The first whorls are straight but later whorls are concave.

Coloration of the shell is cream white or with faint brown flecks.

The shell height is up to 13 mm, and the width is up to 10 mm. It is small for the genus.
