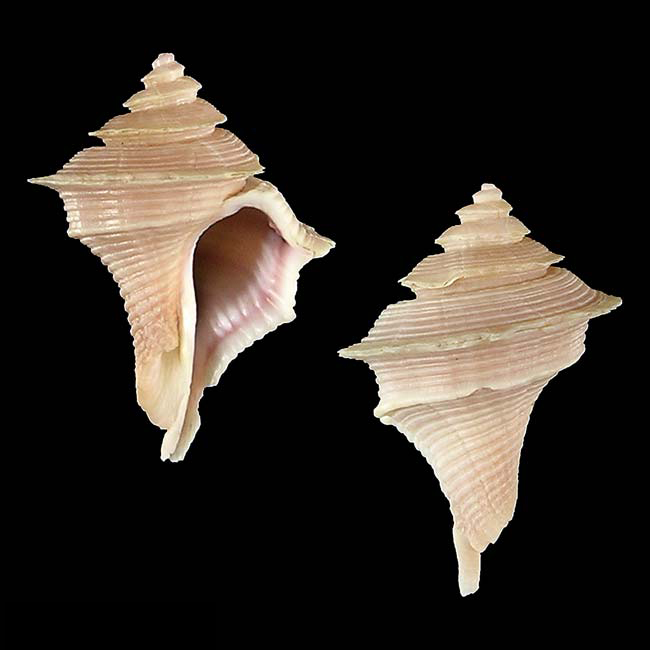

Scientific classification
- Kingdom: Animalia
- Phylum: Mollusca
- Class: Gastropoda
- Subclass: Caenogastropoda
- Order: Neogastropoda
- Superfamily: incertae sedis
- Genus: Enigmavasum; Poppe & Tagaro, 2005
- Species: E. enigmaticum

Binomial name
- Enigmavasum enigmaticum Poppe, & Tagaro, 2005

= Enigmavasum =

Genus of gastropods

Enigmavasum is a genus of sea snails, marine gastropod mollusks, not assigned to a family and classified in the superfamily Neogastropoda incertae sedis (temporary name). The only species is Enigmavasum enigmaticum.
