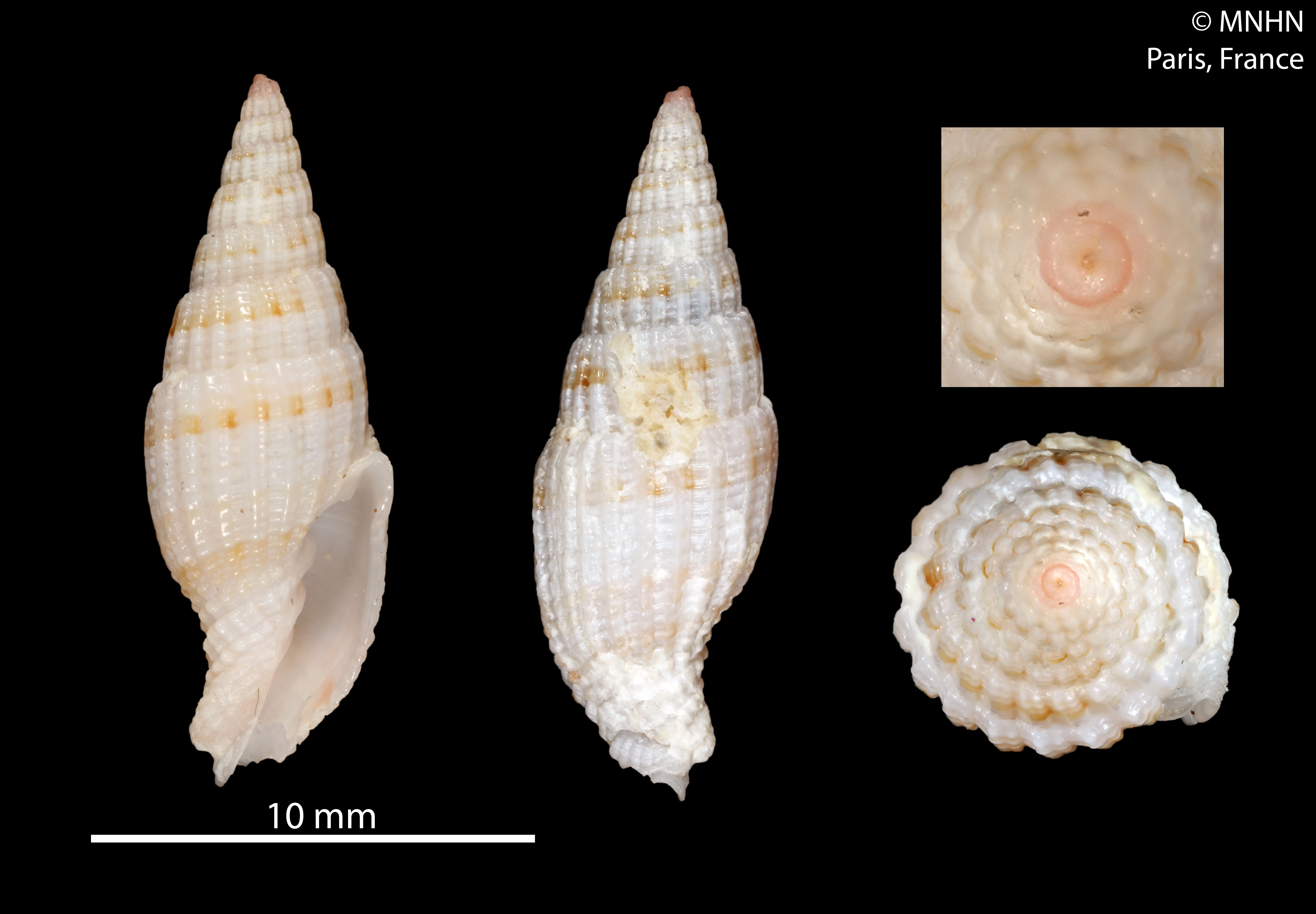
- Shell of Vexillum giselae (paratype at MNHN, Paris)

Scientific classification
- Kingdom: Animalia
- Phylum: Mollusca
- Class: Gastropoda
- Subclass: Caenogastropoda
- Order: Neogastropoda
- Superfamily: Turbinelloidea
- Family: Costellariidae
- Genus: Vexillum
- Species: V. giselae

Binomial name
- Vexillum giselae Poppe, Tagaro & Salisbury, 2009

= Vexillum giselae =

Species of gastropod

Vexillum giselae is a species of small sea snail, marine gastropod mollusk in the family Costellariidae, the ribbed miters.

== Description ==
The length of the shell attains 16.8 mm.

== Distribution ==
This marine species occurs off Papua New Guinea.
