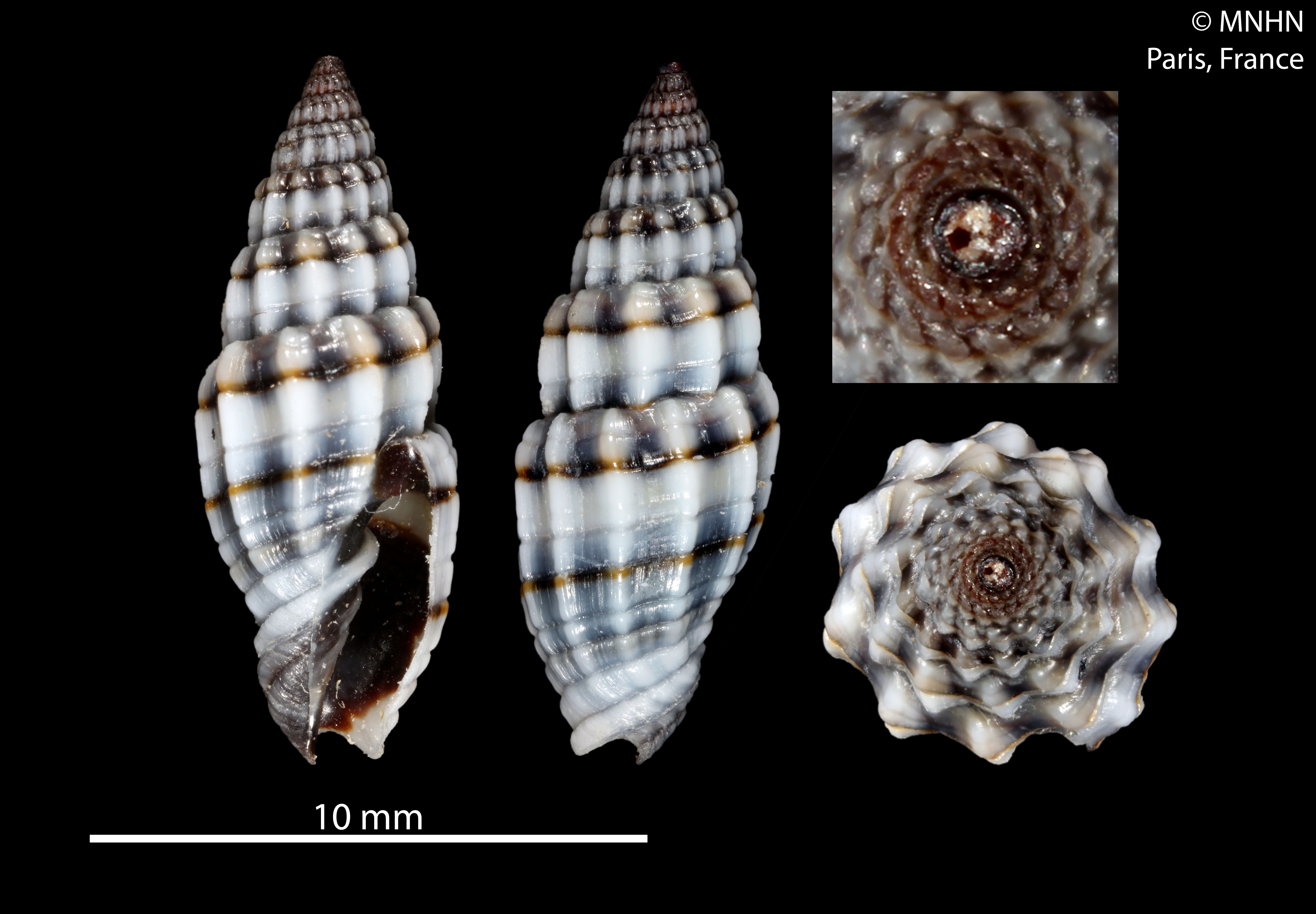
- Shell of Vexillum praefulguratum (paratype at MNHN, Paris)

Scientific classification
- Kingdom: Animalia
- Phylum: Mollusca
- Class: Gastropoda
- Subclass: Caenogastropoda
- Order: Neogastropoda
- Family: Costellariidae
- Genus: Vexillum
- Species: V. praefulguratum

Binomial name
- Vexillum praefulguratum Poppe, 2008

= Vexillum praefulguratum =

Species of gastropod

Vexillum praefulguratum is a species of small sea snail, marine gastropod mollusk in the family Costellariidae, the ribbed miters.

== Description ==
The length of the shell attains 13 mm.

== Distribution ==
This marine species occurs off the Philippines.
