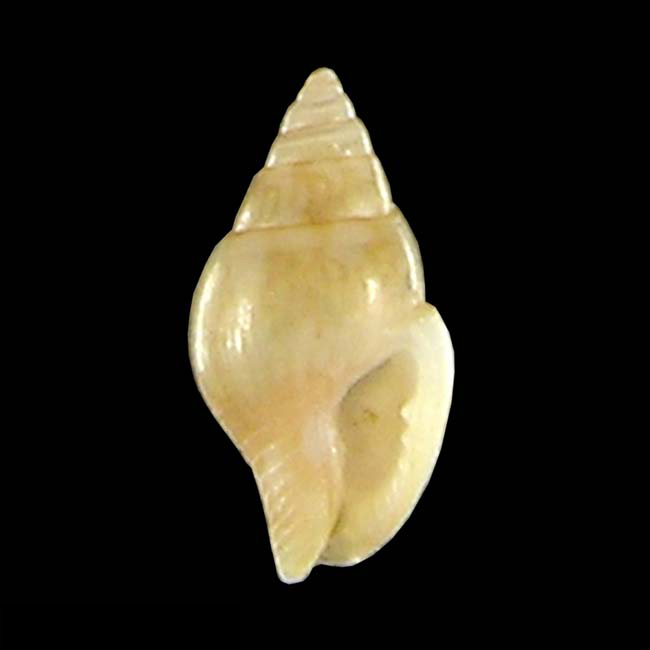

Scientific classification
- Kingdom: Animalia
- Phylum: Mollusca
- Class: Gastropoda
- Subclass: Caenogastropoda
- Order: Neogastropoda
- Family: Columbellidae
- Genus: Mitrella
- Species: M. fineti

Binomial name
- Mitrella fineti Poppe & Tagaro, 2010

= Mitrella fineti =

Species of gastropod

Mitrella fineti is a species of sea snail, a marine gastropod mollusk in the family Columbellidae.
