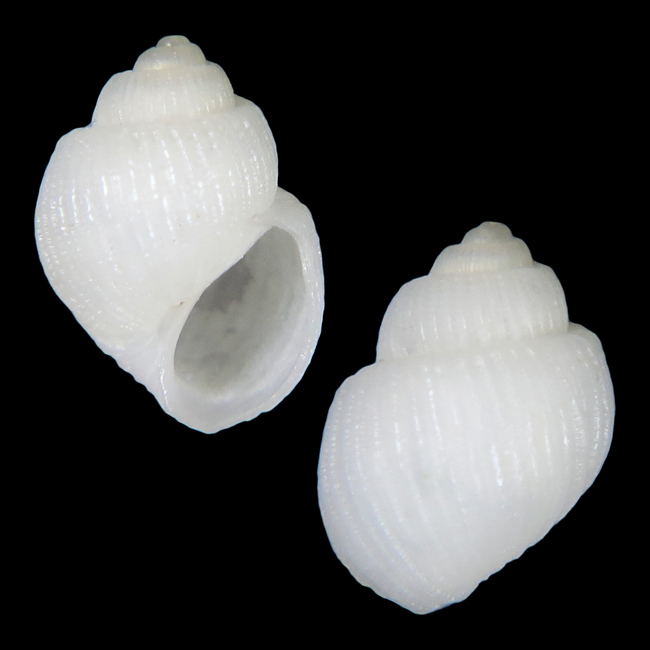

Scientific classification
- Kingdom: Animalia
- Phylum: Mollusca
- Class: Gastropoda
- Subclass: Caenogastropoda
- Order: Littorinimorpha
- Family: Rissoidae
- Genus: Alvania
- Species: A. nix

Binomial name
- Alvania nix Poppe, Tagaro & Goto, 2018

= Alvania nix =

Species of gastropod

Alvania nix is a species of sea snail, a marine gastropod mollusk in the family Rissoidae.

== Description ==
The length of the shell varies between 2.4 mm and 4 mm.

== Distribution ==
This marine species occurs off the Philippines.
