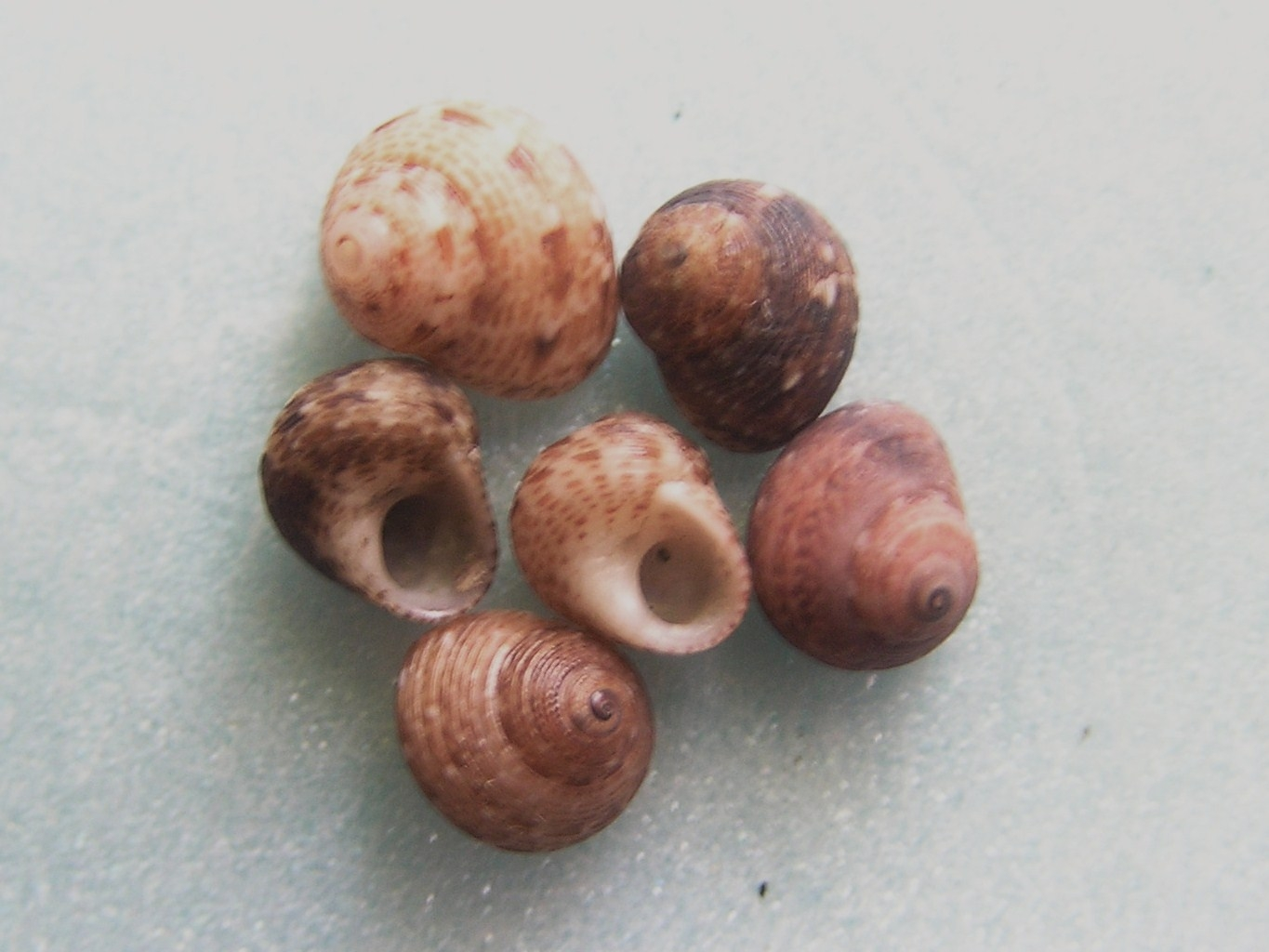
- Leptothyra filifer shells

Scientific classification
- Kingdom: Animalia
- Phylum: Mollusca
- Class: Gastropoda
- Subclass: Vetigastropoda
- Order: Trochida
- Superfamily: Trochoidea
- Family: Colloniidae
- Subfamily: Colloniinae
- Genus: Leptothyra sensu Pease, 1869

Type species
- Leptothyra costata Pease, 1869

= Leptothyra =

Genus of gastropods

Leptothyra is a genus of sea snails, marine gastropod mollusks in the family Colloniidae.

This genus was previously placed in the family Turbinidae.

The name Leptothyra is generally attributed to Pease (1869), and the name "Leptothyra Pease, 1869" is usually treated as a valid name for small colloniines. Although Leptothyra is a junior objective synonym of Homalopoma, the species usually treated as valid in that genus are provisionally listed in WoRMS under "Leptothyra sensu Pease, 1869", pending a taxonomic/nomenclatural reappraisal.

Leptothyra J. G. Cooper, 1867 is now considered a junior objective synonym of the genus Homalopoma Carpenter, 1864.

== Description ==
The small, solid shell has a turbinate or globose shape. The operculum is multispiral with a subcentral nucleus and concave in the centre outside. The main character distinguishing Collonia from Leptothyra seems to be the peculiar peristome of the former.

== Species ==
Species within the genus Leptothyra include:

- Leptothyra balnearii Pilsbry, H.A., 1920
- Leptothyra benthicola (Marshall, 1979)
- Leptothyra candida Pease, 1861
- Leptothyra filifer (Deshayes, 1863)
- Leptothyra grossa Feng, 1996
- Leptothyra kermadecensis (Marshall, 1979)
- Leptothyra morini Viader, R., 1951
- Leptothyra nanina (Souverbie in Souverbie & Montrouzier, 1864)
- Leptothyra rubens Melvill & Standen, 1903

Species brought into synonymy

- Leptothyra africana Bartsch, 1915: synonym of Cinysca spuria (Gould, 1861)
- Leptothyra agulhasensis Thiele, 1925: synonym of Homalopoma agulhasense (Thiele, 1925)
- Leptothyra albida Dall, 1881: synonym of Homalopoma albidum (Dall, 1881)
- Leptothyra albocincta Turton, 1932: synonym of Tricolia striolata (Turton, 1932)
- Leptothyra alfredensis Bartsch, 1915: synonym of Parviturbo alfredensis (Bartsch, 1915)
- Leptothyra arenacea Pritchard & Gatliff, 1902: synonym of Charisma arenacea (Pritchard & Gatliff, 1902)
- Leptothyra carminea Bartsch, 1915: synonym of Homalopoma quantillum carmineum (Bartsch, 1915)
- Leptothyra coelata A. Adams, 1854: synonym of Anadema macandrewii Mörch, 1868
- Leptothyra costata Pease, 1869: synonym of Leptothyra verruca (Gould, 1845)
- Leptothyra crassilirata Preston, 1909: synonym of Collonista crassilirata (Preston, 1909)
- Leptothyra cunninghami E. A. Smith, 1881: synonym of Homalopoma cunninghami (E. A. Smith, 1881)
- Leptothyra delecta E. A. Smith, 1899: synonym of Collonista delecta (E. A. Smith, 1899)
- Leptothyra eroopolitana (Issel, 1869) : synonym of Collonista eroopolitana (Issel, 1869)
- Leptothyra eucosmia Turton, 1932: synonym of Cinysca spuria (Gould, 1861)
- Leptothyra fluctuata (Hutton, 1883): synonym of Argalista fluctuata (Hutton, 1883)
- Leptothyra folini Pilsbry, 1889: synonym of Collonista purpurata (Deshayes, 1863)
- Leptothyra gestroi Caramagna, 1888: synonym of Yaronia gestroi (Caramagna, 1888)
- Leptothyra globuloides Dautzenberg & H. Fischer, 1896: synonym of Cantrainea globuloides (Dautzenberg & H. Fischer, 1896)
- Leptothyra induta Watson, 1879: synonym of Homalopoma indutum (Watson, 1879)
- Leptothyra induta var. tincta Dall, 1889: synonym of Homalopoma indutum (Watson, 1879)
- Leptothyra induta var. insculpta Dall, 1889: synonym of Homalopoma indutum (Watson, 1879)
- Leptothyra inepta (Gould, A.A., 1861): synonym of Neocollonia pilula (Dunker, 1860): synonym of Bothropoma pilula (Dunker, 1860)
- Leptothyra innocens Thiele, 1912: synonym of Leptocollonia innocens (Thiele, 1912)
- Leptothyra insculpta Dall, 1889: synonym of Homalopoma indutum (Watson, 1879)
- Leptothyra laeta (Montrouzier in Souverbie & Montrouzier, 1863): synonym of Collonia granulosa Pease, 1868
- Leptothyra limata Dall, 1889: synonym of Homalopoma linnei (Dall, 1889)
- Leptothyra linnei Dall, 1889: synonym of Homalopoma linnei (Dall, 1889)
- Leptothyra paucicostata Dall, 1871: synonym of Homalopoma paucicostatum (Dall, 1871)
- Leptothyra philipiana Dall, 1889: synonym of Cantrainea philipiana (Dall, 1889)
- Leptothyra picta Marshall, 1979: synonym of Leptothyra kermadecensis Marshall, 1979
- Leptothyra quantilla (Gould, 1861): synonym of Homalopoma quantillum (Gould, 1861)
- Leptothyra rotundata (G.B. Sowerby III, 1892): synonym of Homalopoma rotundatum (G.B. Sowerby III, 1892)
- Leptothyra rubricincta (Mighels, 1845): synonym of Collonista rubricincta (Mighels, 1845)
- Leptothyra sakaensis Yokoyama, 1925: synonym of Littorina brevicula (Philippi, 1844)
- Leptothyra sanguinea Linnaeus, 1758: synonym of Homalopoma sanguineum (Linnaeus, 1758)
- Leptothyra solida Preston, 1908: synonym of Collonista solida (Preston, 1908)
- Leptothyra tincta Dall, 1889: synonym of Homalopoma indutum (Watson, 1879)
- Leptothyra verruca (Gould, 1845): synonym of Collonista verruca (Gould, 1845)
