= Rotella =

Rotella may refer to:

== Animals ==
- Argalista rotella, a sea snail of family Colloniidae
- Homalopoma rotella, a sea snail of family Colloniidae
- Microgaza rotella, a sea snail of family Solariellidae

== People with the surname ==
- Carlo Rotella, American writer and academic
- Franco Rotella (1966–2009), Italian footballer
- John Rotella, American saxophonist
- Kate Rotella (born 1964), American politician
- Mark Rotella (born 1967), American author
- Mimmo Rotella (1918–2006), Italian artist and poet
- Perry Rotella (born 1963), American businessman
- Sebastian Rotella, American journalist and novelist

== Other uses ==
- Rotella, Marche, a comune (municipality) in the Province of Ascoli Piceno, Italy
- Shell Rotella, a line of heavy duty diesel engine lubrication products produced by Shell Oil Company

== See also ==
- Rodela (disambiguation)
