= L. candida =

L. candida may refer to:

- Laelia candida, a synonym for Laelia albida, an epiphytic orchid species found in Mexico
- Leptothyra candida, a sea snail species

== See also ==
- Candida (disambiguation)
