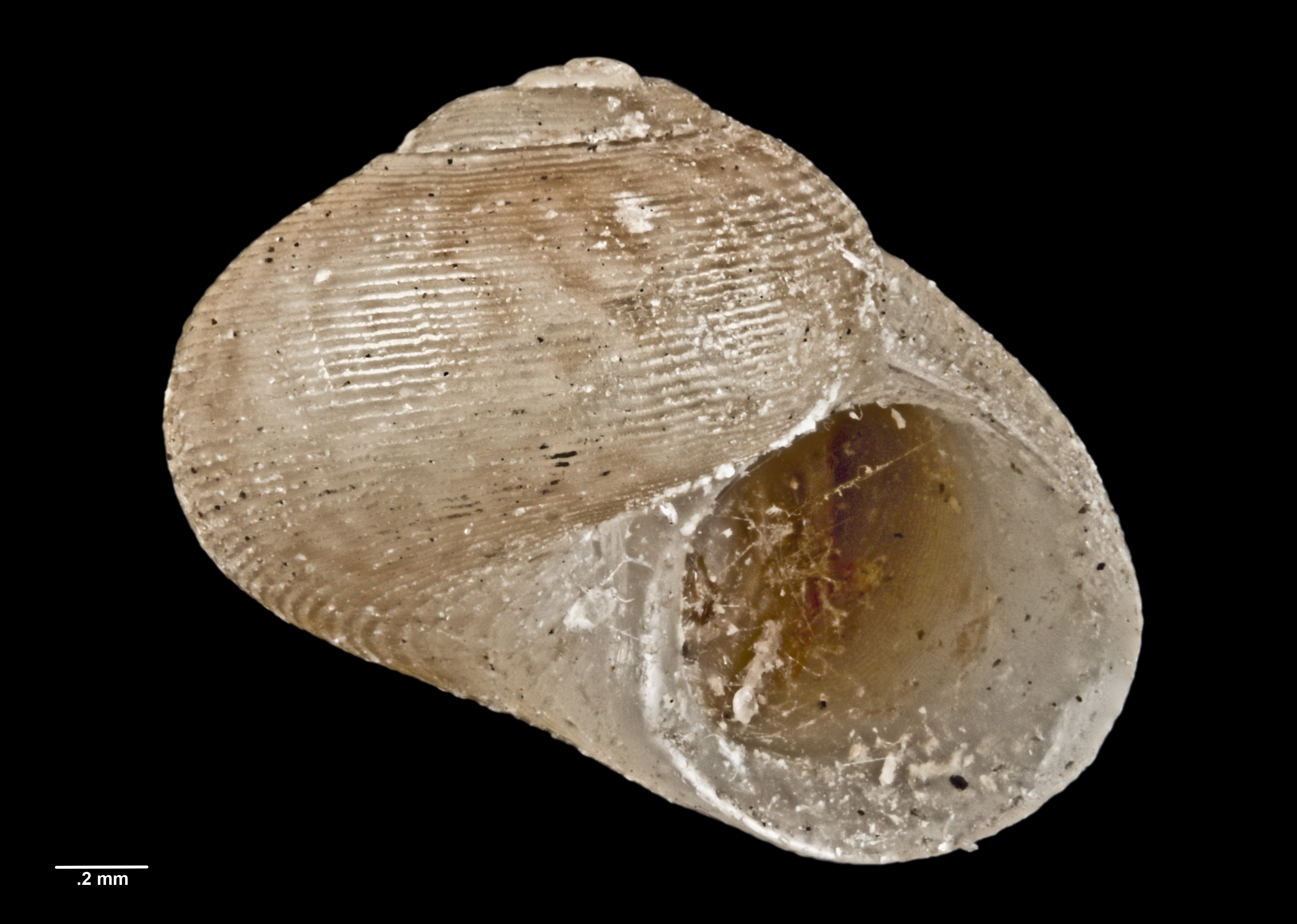
- Argalista nana

Scientific classification
- Kingdom: Animalia
- Phylum: Mollusca
- Class: Gastropoda
- Subclass: Vetigastropoda
- Order: Trochida
- Family: Colloniidae
- Subfamily: Colloniinae
- Genus: Argalista; Iredale, 1915

Type species
- Cyclostrema fluctuata Hutton, F.W., 1883

Synonyms
- Homalopoma (Argalista) Iredale, 1915

= Argalista =

Genus of gastropods

Argalista is a genus of sea snails, marine gastropod mollusks in the subfamily Colloniinae of the family Colloniidae.

== Distribution ==
These marine are endemic to New Zealand, except Argalista kingensis, which occurs off Tasmania and Argalista rosea, which occurs off Victoria, Australia.

== Species ==
Species within the genus Argalista include:

- † Argalista aequor Laws, 1941
- Argalista agulhasensis (Thiele, 1925)
- Argalista amakusaensis (T. Habe, 1960)
- † Argalista arta Marwick, 1928
- Argalista corallina (Cotton & Godfrey, 1935)
- Argalista crassicostata (Murdoch, 1905)
- † Argalista effusa Marwick, 1928
- Argalista filifera (Deshayes, 1863)
- Argalista fluctuata (Hutton, 1883)
- Argalista fugitiva (Hedley, 1911)
- Argalista gelleneae Poppe, Tagaro & S.-I Huang, 2025
- Argalista glareosa (A. Gould, 1861)
- Argalista hapei Poppe, Tagaro & S.-I Huang, 2025
- † Argalista kaiparaensis H. J. Finlay, 1930
- Argalista kingensis May, 1923
- † Argalista kingi A. W. B. Powell, 1938
- † Argalista leniumbilicata Laws, 1935
- Argalista lorenzi Poppe, Tagaro & S.-I Huang, 2023
- Argalista morrisoni Poppe, Tagaro & S.-I Huang, 2023
- Argalista nana Finlay, 1930
- Argalista parvipulcherrima Poppe, Tagaro & S.-I Huang, 2023
- † Argalista promicans Laws, 1936
- † Argalista proumbilicata H. J. Finlay, 1930
- † Argalista provariecostata Laws, 1948
- † Argalista roseopunctata (Angas, 1880)
- Argalista rotella Powell, 1937
- † Argalista sola Laws, 1940
- Argalista tapparonei (Caramagna, 1888)
- Argalista umbilicata Powell, 1926

== Synonyms ==
- Argalista imperforata (Suter, 1908): synonym of Complicata collonista imperforata (Suter, 1908) : synonym of Collonista imperforata (Suter, 1908) (superseded combination)
- Argalista micans Powell, 1931: synonym of Cirsonella micans (A. W. B. Powell, 1931) (superseded combination)
- Argalista rosea (Tenison Woods, 1876): synonym of Planacollonista rosea (Tenison Woods, 1876) (superseded combination)
- Argalista variecostata Powell, 1937: synonym of Orbiscollonia variecostata (A. W. B. Powell, 1937) (superseded combination)
