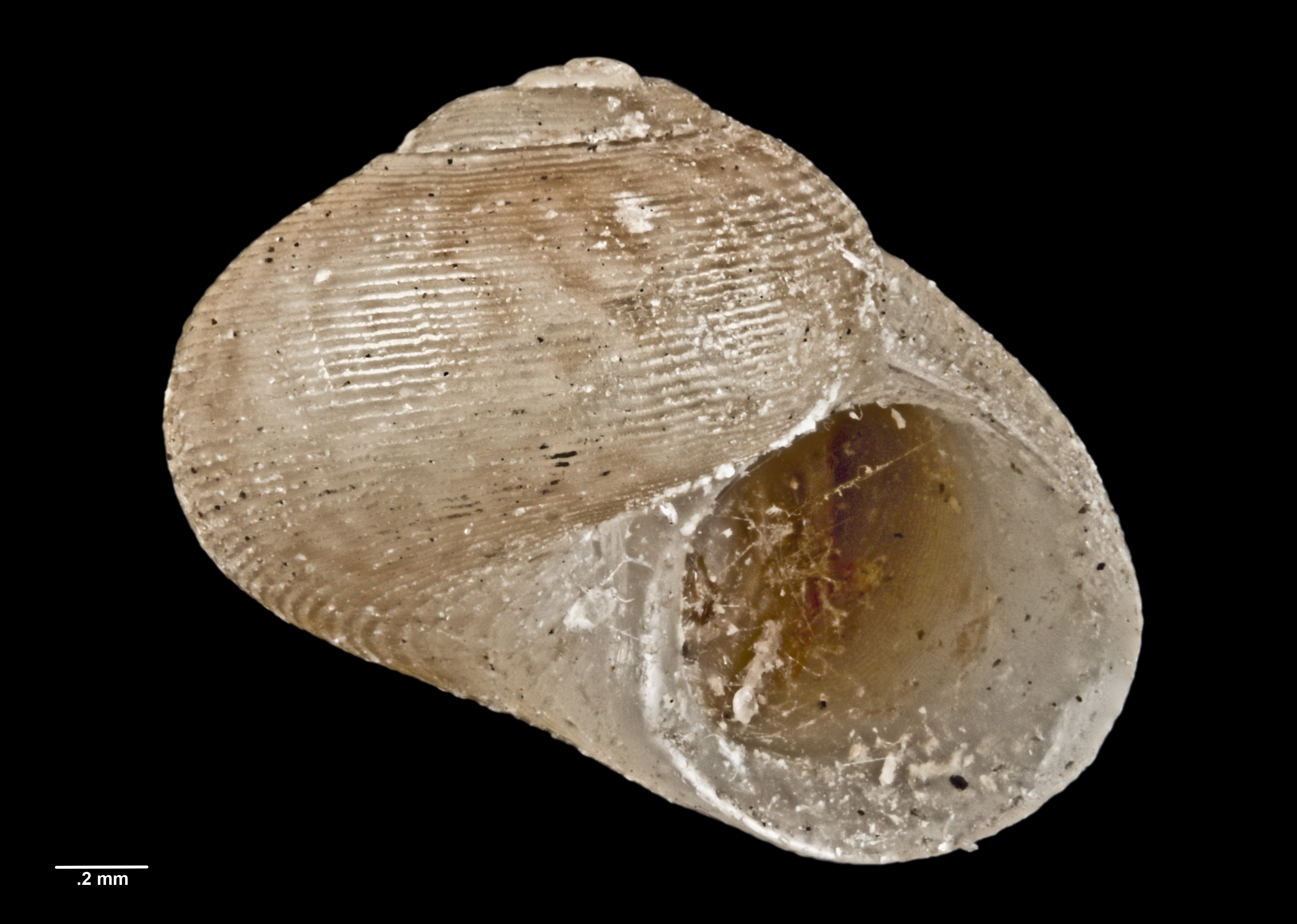

Scientific classification
- Kingdom: Animalia
- Phylum: Mollusca
- Class: Gastropoda
- Subclass: Vetigastropoda
- Order: Trochida
- Superfamily: Trochoidea
- Family: Colloniidae
- Subfamily: Colloniinae
- Genus: Argalista
- Species: A. nana

Binomial name
- Argalista nana Finlay, 1930

= Argalista nana =

Species of gastropod

Argalista nana is a species of small sea snail with calcareous opercula, a marine gastropod mollusk in the family Colloniidae.

== Description ==
A. nana reaches a width of 2.5mm and a height of 0.9mm.

(Original description) The shell is very similar to Argalista fluctuata in general appearance, but it is uniformly smaller when adult.

The spiral grooves are the same in arrangement, but they are considerably finer. A rather wide band round the umbilicus is free from spiral grooves in A. fluctuata; in A. nana, this band is much narrower, with the spirals continuing almost up to the perforation.

Perhaps the best distinguishing character is the umbilicus, which in A. nana, is much smaller and almost filled up, appearing much as in Uberella vitrea (Hutton). The colour pattern is much the same as in A. fluctuata.

== Distribution ==
This marine species is endemic to New Zealand. It is found from Three Kings Island to Northland.
