= Argalista glareosa =

Scientific classification
- Kingdom: Animalia
- Phylum: Mollusca
- Class: Gastropoda
- Subclass: Vetigastropoda
- Order: Trochida
- Superfamily: Trochoidea
- Family: Colloniidae
- Subfamily: Colloniinae
- Genus: Argalista
- Species: A. glareosa

Binomial name
- Argalista glareosa (A. Gould, 1861)

Synonyms
- Collonista glareosa (A. Gould, 1861) superseded combination; Leptothyra glareosa (A. Gould, 1861) (superseded combination); Monilea glareosa . Gould, 1861 (superseded combination)

Species of gastropod

Argalista glareosa is a species of small sea snail with calcareous opercula, a marine gastropod mollusk in the family Colloniidae.

Subspecies
Argalista glareosa glareosa (A. Gould, 1861)

== Description ==
The diameter of the shell attains 5 mm.

(Original description in Latin) The shell is small, solid, ovate-globose, and ash-colored, variegated with radiating, brownish flames. It has five swollen whorls. The apical whorls are folded and granular, while the remaining whorls are encircled by numerous lirae (spiral threads), of which three to four major ones are sometimes subdivided. The base is rounded, with a modest umbilicus, which is folded and notched at the margin. The aperture is circular. The outer lip is thickened and simple.

== Distribution ==
This marine species occurs off Japan.
