= Charisma radians =

Scientific classification
- Kingdom: Animalia
- Phylum: Mollusca
- Class: Gastropoda
- Subclass: Vetigastropoda
- Order: Trochida
- Superfamily: Trochoidea
- Family: Trochidae
- Genus: Charisma
- Species: C. radians

Binomial name
- Charisma radians (Laseron, 1954)

Synonyms
- Cavostella radians Laseron, 1954; Charisma (Cavostella) radians (Laseron, 1954)

Species of gastropod

Charisma radians (Latin: charisma meaning 'gift' and radians from the verb radior meaning 'shine') a species of extremely small sea snail, a marine gastropod mollusk in the family Trochidae, the top snails.

== Description ==
The height of the shell is 2 mm.

== Distribution ==
This marine species is endemic to Australia and occurs off New South Wales.
