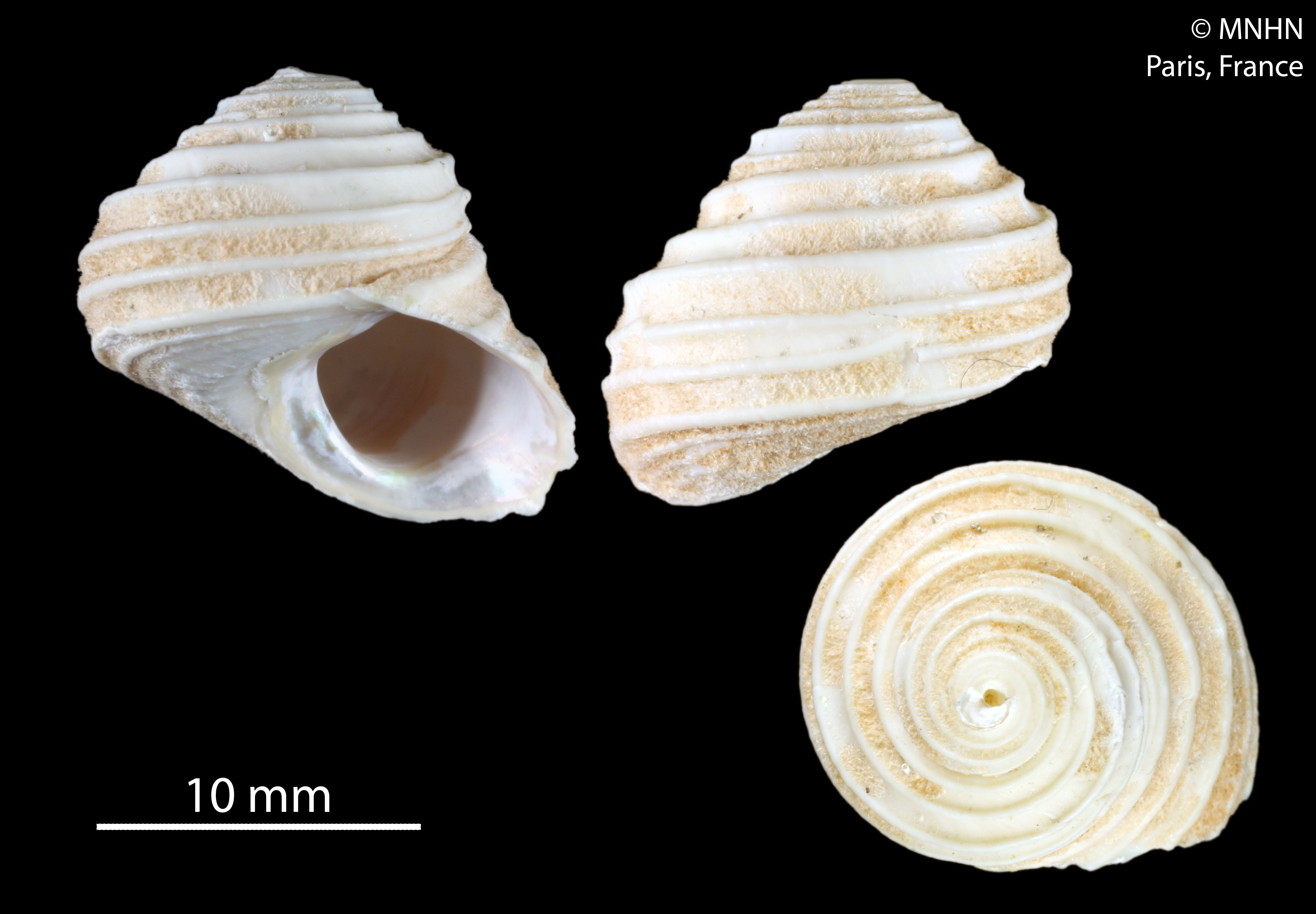
- Shell of Cantrainea jamsteci (paratype at MNHN, Paris)

Scientific classification
- Kingdom: Animalia
- Phylum: Mollusca
- Class: Gastropoda
- Subclass: Vetigastropoda
- Order: Trochida
- Family: Colloniidae
- Genus: Cantrainea
- Species: C. jamsteci

Binomial name
- Cantrainea jamsteci (Okutani & Fujikura, 1990)

Synonyms
- Thermocollonia jamsteci Okutani & Fujikura, 1990

= Cantrainea jamsteci =

Species of gastropod

Cantrainea jamsteci is a species of small sea snail with calcareous opercula, a marine gastropod mollusk in the family Colloniidae.

== Distribution ==
This marine species occurs off Japan.
