= Cantrainea inexpectata =

Scientific classification
- Kingdom: Animalia
- Phylum: Mollusca
- Class: Gastropoda
- Subclass: Vetigastropoda
- Order: Trochida
- Family: Colloniidae
- Genus: Cantrainea
- Species: C. inexpectata

Binomial name
- Cantrainea inexpectata B.A. Marshall, 1979

Species of gastropod

Cantrainea inexpectata is a species of small sea snail with calcareous opercula, a marine gastropod mollusk in the family Colloniidae.

== Distribution ==
This marine species is endemic to New Zealand.
