= Argalista lorenzi =

Scientific classification
- Kingdom: Animalia
- Phylum: Mollusca
- Class: Gastropoda
- Subclass: Vetigastropoda
- Order: Trochida
- Superfamily: Trochoidea
- Family: Colloniidae
- Subfamily: Colloniinae
- Genus: Argalista
- Species: A. lorenzi

Binomial name
- Argalista lorenzi Poppe, Tagaro & S.-I Huang, 2023

Species of gastropod

Argalista lorenzi is a species of small sea snail with calcareous opercula, a marine gastropod mollusk in the family Colloniidae.

== Distribution ==
This marine species is occurs off the New Ireland Province, Papua New Guinea.
