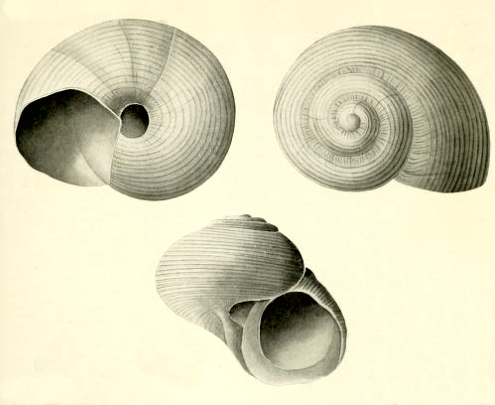
- Shell of Argalista fugitiva (holotype)

Scientific classification
- Kingdom: Animalia
- Phylum: Mollusca
- Class: Gastropoda
- Subclass: Vetigastropoda
- Order: Trochida
- Superfamily: Trochoidea
- Family: Colloniidae
- Subfamily: Colloniinae
- Genus: Argalista
- Species: A. fugitiva

Binomial name
- Argalista fugitiva (Hedley, 1911)

Synonyms
- Leptothyra fugitiva Hedley, 1911 superseded combination

= Argalista fugitiva =

Species of gastropod

Argalista fugitiva is a species of small sea snail with calcareous opercula, a marine gastropod mollusk in the family Colloniidae.

== Description ==
The length of the shell attains 1.2 mm, its diameter 1.85 mm.

(Original description) The shell is small, solid, depressed-turbinate, and narrowly perforate. Its colour is white.

It has three and a half whorls, rapidly increasing in size. The body whorl is rounded, descending at the aperture. The spire is slightly gradate.

Regarding the sculpture: On the base and spire there are faint traces of radial sculpture. Along the suture runs a deep groove, followed by a corresponding ridge. The remainder of the body whorl is surrounded by a succession of numerous fine spiral threads, parted by equal grooves.

The aperture is subcircular, and has above it the vestige of a varix. Below the aperture, there is a fold running from the anterior edge of the mouth to the margin of the umbilicus. The edge of the lip is simple, bevelled within, and the columella is excavate. The base is rather flat. The umbilicus is narrow but deep, measuring about one sixth of the shell's diameter.

== Distribution ==
This species is endemic to Australia and occurs off South Australia.
