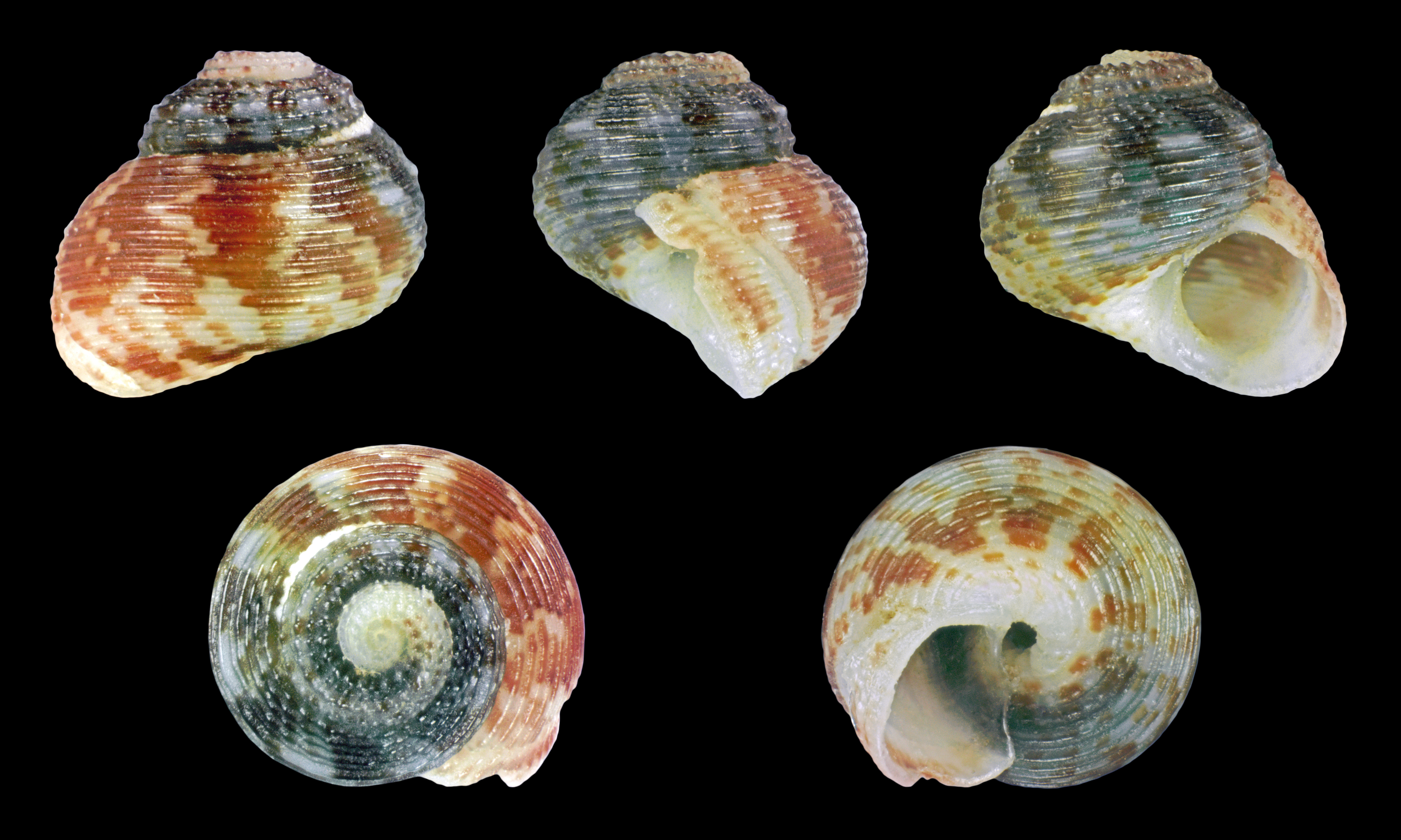
- A shell of Leptothyra nanina

Scientific classification
- Kingdom: Animalia
- Phylum: Mollusca
- Class: Gastropoda
- Subclass: Vetigastropoda
- Order: Trochida
- Superfamily: Trochoidea
- Family: Colloniidae
- Subfamily: Colloniinae
- Genus: Leptothyra
- Species: L. nanina

Binomial name
- Leptothyra nanina (Souverbie in Souverbie & Montrouzier, 1864)

Synonyms
- Collonista nanina (Souverbie in Souverbie & Montrouzier, 1864); Turbo naninus Souverbie in Souverbie & Montrouzier, 1864

= Leptothyra nanina =

Species of gastropod

Leptothyra nanina is a species of small sea snail with calcareous opercula, a marine gastropod mollusk in the family Colloniidae.

== Description ==
The shell reaches a height of 4 mm. The minute, umbilicate shell is suborbicular. The apex is obtuse. The shell is spirally impressed-striate. The apex, the subsutural tract and base exhibit impressed radiating striae. The shell is white, marked around the periphery with equally spaced rosy spots, and comprises five convex whorls terminating in a rounded aperture. There are five, convex whorls. The aperture is rounded. The columella is thickened. The narrow umbilicus is deep, rounded, and radiately plicate on the edge.

== Distribution ==
This marine species occurs in the Indo-West Pacific and off Australia and New Caledonia.
