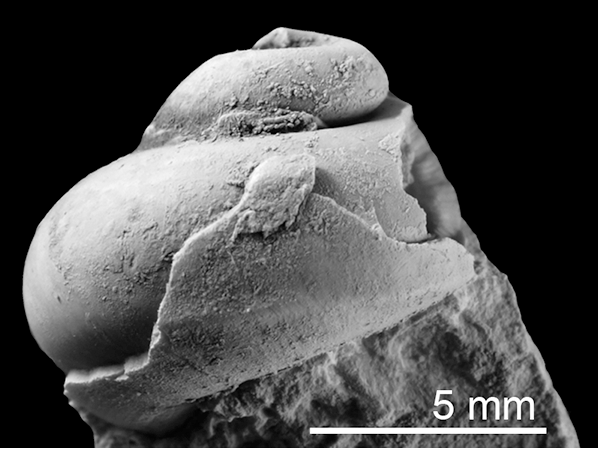
- Fossil of Cantrainea sp. from the late Miocene

Scientific classification
- Kingdom: Animalia
- Phylum: Mollusca
- Class: Gastropoda
- Subclass: Vetigastropoda
- Order: Trochida
- Family: Colloniidae
- Subfamily: Colloniinae
- Genus: Cantrainea; Jeffreys, 1883

Type species
- Turbo peloritanus Cantraine, 1835

Synonyms
- Leptothyropsis Woodring, 1928; Thermocollonia Okutani & Fujikura, 1990; Turbo (Cantrainea) Jeffreys, 1883

= Cantrainea =

Cantrainea Temporal range: Late Miocene-Recent

Genus of gastropods

Cantrainea is a genus of sea snails, marine gastropod mollusks in the family Colloniidae.

== Species ==
Species within the genus Cantrainea include:

- Cantrainea alfi S.-I Huang, I-F. Fu & Poppe, 2016
- Cantrainea boswellae (Barnard, 1969)
- Cantrainea gibbula (Thiele, 1925)
- Cantrainea globuloides (Dautzenberg & H. Fischer, 1896)
- Cantrainea indica (E. A. Smith, 1894)
- Cantrainea inexpectata (Marshall, 1979)
- Cantrainea jamsteci (Okutani & Fujikura, 1990)
- Cantrainea macleani Warén & Bouchet, 1993
- Cantrainea nuda Okutani, 2001
- Cantrainea panamensis (Dall, 1908)
- Cantrainea peloritana (Cantraine, 1835)
- Cantrainea philipiana (Dall, 1889)
- Cantrainea sunderlandi (Petuch, 1987)
- Cantrainea tosaensis (Habe, 1953)
- Cantrainea yoyottei Vilvens, 2001

Species brought into synonymy

- Cantrainea bicarinata (Martens, 1902): synonym of Cinysca bicarinata (E. von Martens, 1902)
- Cantrainea indicus (E. A. Smith, 1894): synonym of Cantrainea indica (E. A. Smith, 1894)
