= Charisma carinata =

Scientific classification
- Kingdom: Animalia
- Phylum: Mollusca
- Class: Gastropoda
- Subclass: Vetigastropoda
- Order: Trochida
- Superfamily: Trochoidea
- Family: Trochidae
- Genus: Charisma
- Species: C. carinata

Binomial name
- Charisma carinata (Verco, 1907)

Synonyms
- Leptothyra carinata Verco, 1907

Species of gastropod

Charisma carinata, common name the carinate charisma, is a species of extremely small sea snail, a marine gastropod mollusk in the family Trochidae, the top snails.

== Description ==
The height of the shell is 1.1 mm, its diameter 1.4 mm. The minute, solid shell contains three and a half whorls. The first two whorls are smooth, white and convex. The spire whorl shows three rounded carinations, one just below the suture which is channelled by it, the second about one-third the distance between the sutures, and the third about one-fourth the distance from the lower suture. The interspaces are concave, and have spiral cords, equidistant; two in the upper space, the posterior the smaller; three in the middle space, small and equal. The body whorl has seven carinations which become gradually lower towards the base, and closer. The interspaces are concave, and provided with spiral lirae, varying from six to two, according to the width of the spaces. The lowest carina forms a margin to the umbilicus which is wide and sculptured with about eight spiral lirae. The spirals are cut up at irregular intervals by radial incisions, and marked by very fine crowded microscopic radial scratches. The aperture is circular; its inner surface smooth, and its outer scalloped by the spirals. Colour, very light amber; some examples are white, others faintly tinged with pink.

== Distribution ==
This marine species is endemic to Australia and occurs off South Australia.
