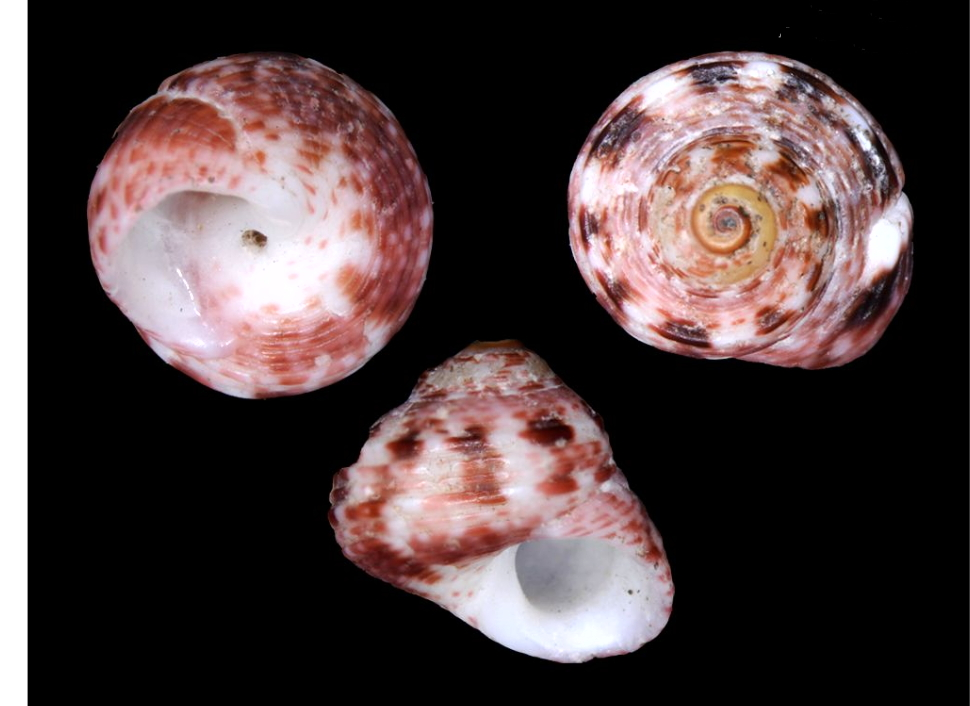
- Shell of Argalista filifera (specimen at MNHN, Paris)

Scientific classification
- Kingdom: Animalia
- Phylum: Mollusca
- Class: Gastropoda
- Subclass: Vetigastropoda
- Order: Trochida
- Superfamily: Trochoidea
- Family: Colloniidae
- Subfamily: Colloniinae
- Genus: Argalista
- Species: A. filifera

Binomial name
- Argalista filifera (Deshayes, 1863)

Synonyms
- Leptothyra filifera (Deshayes, 1863) superseded combination; Turbo filifer Deshayes, 1863 superseded combination

= Argalista filifera =

Species of gastropod

Argalista filifera is a species of small sea snail with calcareous opercula, a marine gastropod mollusk in the family Colloniidae.

== Description ==
The length of the shell attains 7 mm, its diameter also 7 mm.

(Original description) A small shell easily recognizable by its form and coloration. It is globulose, with a short, obtuse spire, composed of five convex whorls, the first two of which are blackish brown.

The body whorl is very large and slightly depressed toward the center. Next to the columella, it shows a narrow and deep perforation.

The surface is sculptured with a great number of small, transverse, thread-like ribs (or costae), which are simple, convex, equal, and regular. One, or sometimes two, of these ribs near the circumference of the body whorl are a little thicker.

The aperture is small and circular. The columella, rather slender at its origin, develops outwardly into a sort of callous auricle.

The shell is thick and solid, and its coloration is highly variable. On a reddish or pinkish background, one or two transverse series of dark brown punctuations are often delineated. However, in other individuals, the coloration is much darker and consists of dark brown marbling alternating with white spots.

== Distribution ==
This species occurs in the Indian Ocean off Réunion.
