= Argalista parvipulcherrima =

Scientific classification
- Kingdom: Animalia
- Phylum: Mollusca
- Class: Gastropoda
- Subclass: Vetigastropoda
- Order: Trochida
- Superfamily: Trochoidea
- Family: Colloniidae
- Subfamily: Colloniinae
- Genus: Argalista
- Species: A. parvipulcherrima

Binomial name
- Argalista parvipulcherrima Poppe, Tagaro & S.-I Huang, 2023

Species of gastropod

Argalista parvipulcherrima is a species of small sea snail with calcareous opercula, a marine gastropod mollusk in the family Colloniidae.

== Distribution ==
This marine species is endemic to Australia and occurs off Esperance Bay, South Australia.
