= Argalista umbilicata =

Scientific classification
- Kingdom: Animalia
- Phylum: Mollusca
- Class: Gastropoda
- Subclass: Vetigastropoda
- Order: Trochida
- Superfamily: Trochoidea
- Family: Colloniidae
- Subfamily: Colloniinae
- Genus: Argalista
- Species: A. umbilicata

Binomial name
- Argalista umbilicata Powell, 1926

Species of gastropod

Argalista umbilicata is a species of small sea snail with calcareous opercula, a marine gastropod mollusk in the family Colloniidae.

== Description ==
The height of the shell attains 1.9 mm, its diameter 2.75 mm.

== Distribution ==
This marine species is endemic to New Zealand and occurs off South Island and Chatham Rise.
