= Collonista amakusaensis =

Scientific classification
- Kingdom: Animalia
- Phylum: Mollusca
- Class: Gastropoda
- Subclass: Vetigastropoda
- Order: Trochida
- Family: Colloniidae
- Genus: Collonista
- Species: C. amakusaensis

Binomial name
- Collonista amakusaensis Habe, 1960

Species of gastropod

Collonista amakusaensis is a species of sea snail, a marine gastropod mollusk in the family Colloniidae.

== Description ==
The shell reaches a height of 3 mm.

== Distribution ==
This marine species occurs off Japan.
