= Cantrainea indica =

Scientific classification
- Kingdom: Animalia
- Phylum: Mollusca
- Class: Gastropoda
- Subclass: Vetigastropoda
- Order: Trochida
- Family: Colloniidae
- Genus: Cantrainea
- Species: C. indica

Binomial name
- Cantrainea indica (E. A. Smith, 1894)

Synonyms
- Cantrainea indicus (E. A. Smith, 1894)

Species of gastropod

Cantrainea indica is a species of small sea snail with calcareous opercula, a marine gastropod mollusk in the family Colloniidae.
