= Cantrainea panamensis =

Scientific classification
- Kingdom: Animalia
- Phylum: Mollusca
- Class: Gastropoda
- Subclass: Vetigastropoda
- Order: Trochida
- Family: Colloniidae
- Genus: Cantrainea
- Species: C. panamensis

Binomial name
- Cantrainea panamensis (Dall, 1908)

Synonyms
- Homalopoma panamense (Dall, 1908)

Species of gastropod

Cantrainea panamensis is a species of small sea snail with calcareous opercula, a marine gastropod mollusc in the family Colloniidae.

== Description ==
Shell small, trochiform and stout; spire moderately elevated with evenly convex whorls separated by a distinct, slightly impressed suture. Sculpture of low, flat-topped spiral cords overrun by dense incremental growth lines, producing a subtle, satiny texture; periphery rounded, not keeled. Base gently convex with additional fine spiral threads toward the umbilical region. Aperture subcircular and slightly oblique; outer lip thickened (more robust in fully adult shells) and smooth within; inner lip with a thin nacreous callus that narrows or partly covers the umbilical chink. Columella is short and straight. Operculum calcareous, multispiral (typical of Colloniidae). Maximum shell height ~20 mm.

== Distribution ==
This species occurs in the Pacific Ocean from Baja California, Mexico to Panama
