= Argalista agulhasensis =

Scientific classification
- Kingdom: Animalia
- Phylum: Mollusca
- Class: Gastropoda
- Subclass: Vetigastropoda
- Order: Trochida
- Superfamily: Trochoidea
- Family: Colloniidae
- Subfamily: Colloniinae
- Genus: Argalista
- Species: A. agulhasensis

Binomial name
- Argalista agulhasensis (Thiele, 1925)

Synonyms
- Homalopoma agulhasense (Thiele, 1925) superseded combination; Leptothyra agulhasensis Thiele, 1925 superseded combination

Species of gastropod

Argalista agulhasensis, common name the coral-red gibbula, is a species of small sea snail with calcareous opercula, a marine gastropod mollusk in the family Colloniidae.

== Distribution ==
This marine species occurs off Cape Agulhas, Western Cape, South Africa.
