= Cantrainea nuda =

Scientific classification
- Kingdom: Animalia
- Phylum: Mollusca
- Class: Gastropoda
- Subclass: Vetigastropoda
- Order: Trochida
- Family: Colloniidae
- Genus: Cantrainea
- Species: C. nuda

Binomial name
- Cantrainea nuda Okutani, 2001

Species of gastropod

Cantrainea nuda is a species of sea snail, a marine gastropod mollusk in the family Colloniidae.
