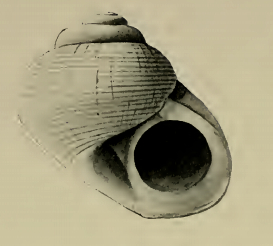
- Original image of a shell of Charisma compacta

Scientific classification
- Kingdom: Animalia
- Phylum: Mollusca
- Class: Gastropoda
- Subclass: Vetigastropoda
- Order: Trochida
- Superfamily: Trochoidea
- Family: Trochidae
- Genus: Charisma
- Species: C. compacta

Binomial name
- Charisma compacta Hedley, 1915

= Charisma compacta =

Species of gastropod

Charisma compacta is a species of extremely small sea snail, a marine gastropod mollusk in the family Trochidae, the top snails.

== Description ==
The height of the shell attains 1.9 mm, its diameter 2 mm. The shell is solid and has a turbinate shape. Its colour is pale cream. The four whorls are rather loosely coiled and separated by channelled sutures. The spire-whorls are smooth. The body whorl is sculptured with about twenty regularly spaced, sharp, spiral grooves. The umbilicus measures about one-eighth of the shell's diameter; its margin is smooth and rounded. The aperture-side of the umbilicus shows an obscure funicle. The circular aperture of the shell is descending. The inner lip is slightly expanded. The outer lip is simple.

== Distribution ==
This marine species is endemic to Australia and occurs off New South Wales.
