= Leptothyra rubens =

Scientific classification
- Kingdom: Animalia
- Phylum: Mollusca
- Class: Gastropoda
- Subclass: Vetigastropoda
- Order: Trochida
- Superfamily: Trochoidea
- Family: Colloniidae
- Subfamily: Colloniinae
- Genus: Leptothyra
- Species: L. rubens

Binomial name
- Leptothyra rubens Melvill & Standen, 1903

Synonyms
- Collonista rubens (Melvill, J.C. & R. Standen, 1903)

Species of gastropod

Leptothyra rubens is a species of small sea snail with calcareous opercula, a marine gastropod mollusk in the family Colloniidae.

== Distribution ==
This marine species occurs in the Gulf of Oman and in the Persian Gulf.
