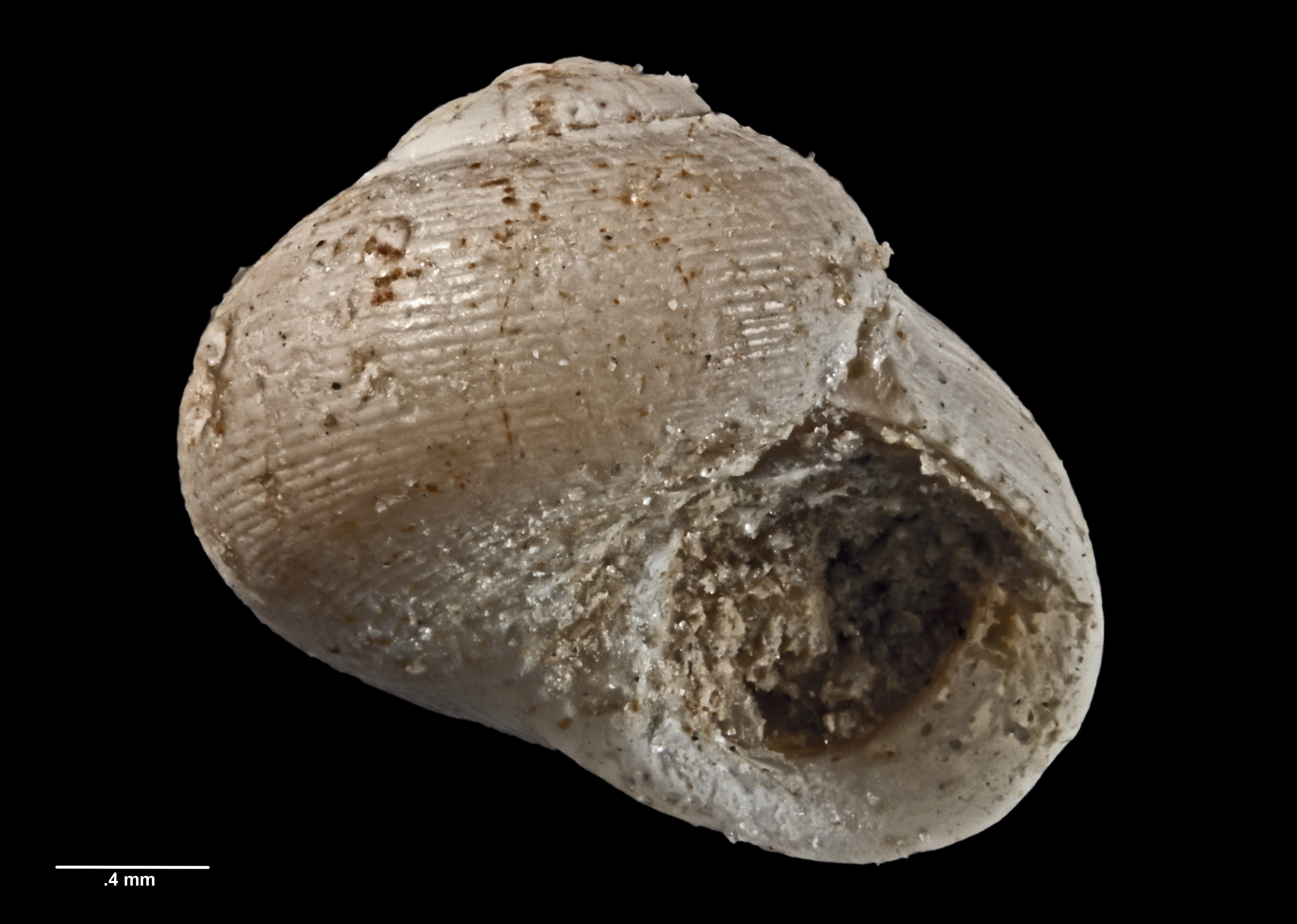
- Holotype from Auckland War Memorial Museum

Scientific classification
- Kingdom: Animalia
- Phylum: Mollusca
- Class: Gastropoda
- Subclass: Vetigastropoda
- Order: Trochida
- Family: Colloniidae
- Genus: Argalista
- Species: †A. kingi

Binomial name
- †Argalista kingi A. W. B. Powell, 1938

= Argalista kingi =

Argalista kingi Temporal range: early Pleistocene

Extinct species of gastropod

Argalista kingi is an extinct species of sea snail, a marine gastropod mollusc in the family Colloniidae. Fossils of the species date to the early Pleistocene strata of the Castlepoint Formation at Castlepoint, Wairarapa, New Zealand.

== Description ==
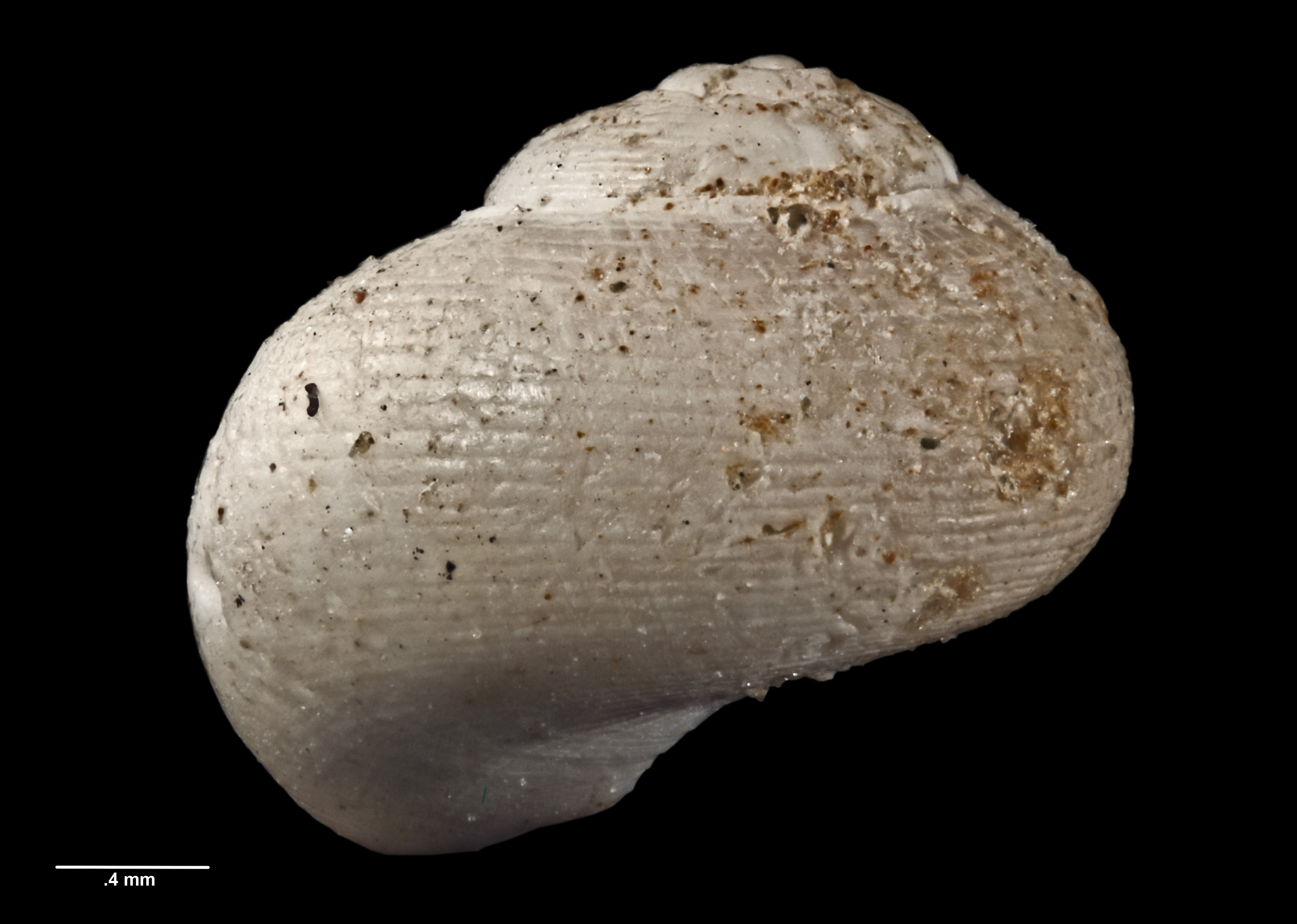
Reverse view of holotype

In the original description, Powell described the species as follows:

Shell small, globose-turbinate, imperforate. Spire rather raised for the genus; about half height of aperture. Whorls four, including flattened, smooth protoconch. Post-nuclear whorls sculptured with flattened spiral cinguli, having linear nterspaces. There are about ten cinguli at the end of the penultimate whorl, and on the body-whorl they continue over on to the base, but are absent from a broad zone surrounding the umbilical area. This zone is a shallow callused depression in the adult, but there is a definitely open and narrow umbilicus in younger shells. The basal lip is slightly effuse. Umbilical depression bordered by a slight fold bearing very weak crenulations. Aperture circular, comparatively small. Peristome thickening rapidly within the aperture.

The holotype of the species has a height of 2.5 mm (0.098 in), and a diameter of 2 mm (0.079 in). It is similar in appearance to Eutinochilus impervius, but can be identified due to A. kingi being more tightly coiled, its adult size being significantly smaller, and by having more of an umbilical depression.

== Taxonomy ==
The species was first described by A.W.B. Powell in 1938. The holotype was collected from the Lighthouse Reef, Castlepoint, Wairarapa, New Zealand in 1924, and is held by the Auckland War Memorial Museum.

== Distribution ==
This extinct marine species occurs in early Pleistocene (Nukumaruan stage) strata of the Castlepoint Formation at Castlepoint, Wairarapa, New Zealand, dating to c. 2.40 million years ago. It is only rarely found at its type locality.
