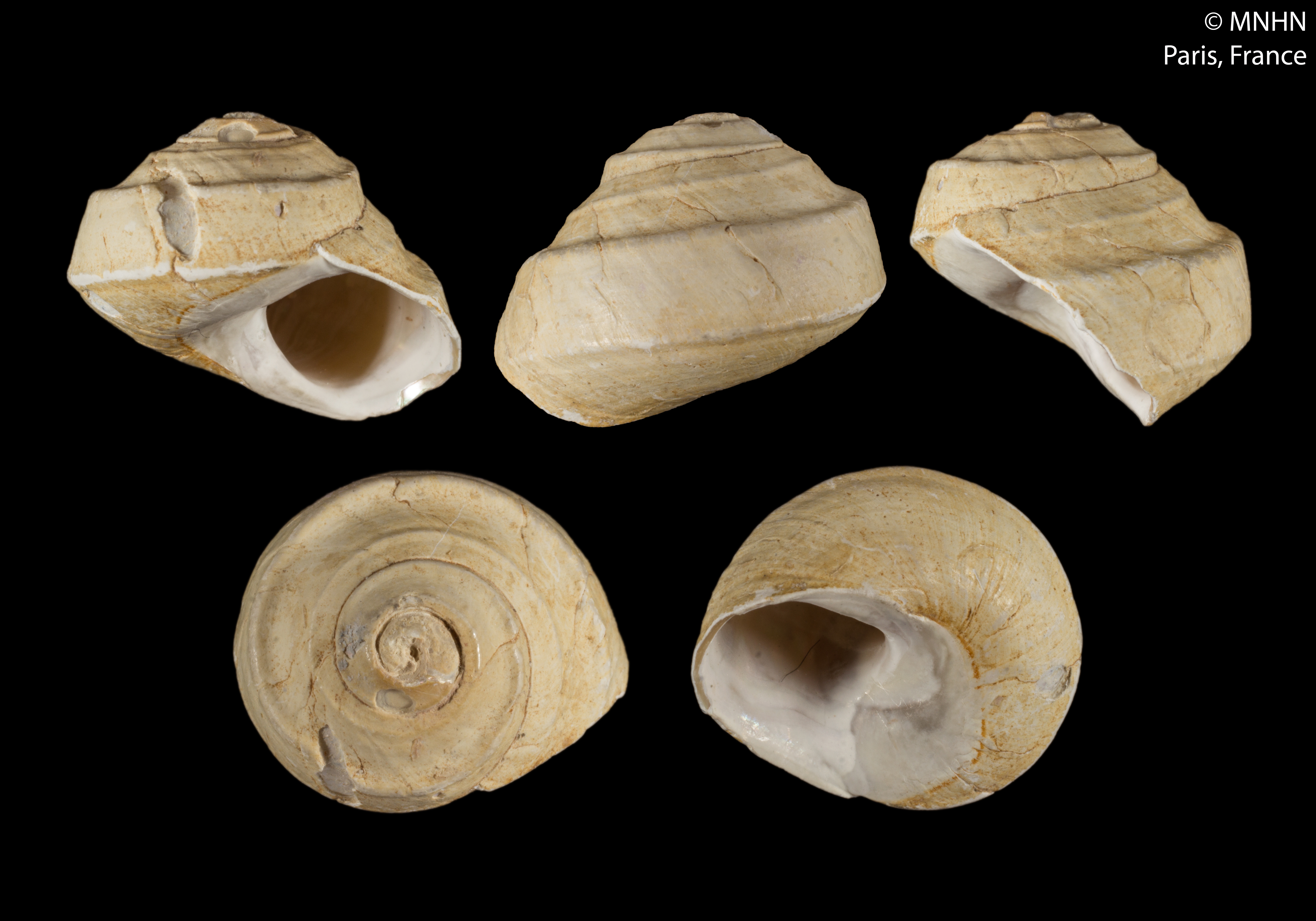
- Shell of Cantrainea macleani (holotype at MNHN, Paris)

Scientific classification
- Kingdom: Animalia
- Phylum: Mollusca
- Class: Gastropoda
- Subclass: Vetigastropoda
- Order: Trochida
- Family: Colloniidae
- Genus: Cantrainea
- Species: C. macleani

Binomial name
- Cantrainea macleani Warén & Bouchet, 1993

= Cantrainea macleani =

Species of gastropod

Cantrainea macleani is a species of sea snail, a marine gastropod mollusk in the family Colloniidae.

== Description ==
The shell grows to a length of 17 mm.

== Distribution ==
This species occurs in the Gulf of Mexico off Southeast US.
