= Charisma simplex =

Scientific classification
- Kingdom: Animalia
- Phylum: Mollusca
- Class: Gastropoda
- Subclass: Vetigastropoda
- Order: Trochida
- Superfamily: Trochoidea
- Family: Trochidae
- Genus: Charisma
- Species: C. simplex

Binomial name
- Charisma simplex (Laseron, 1954)

Synonyms
- Cavotera simplex Laseron, 1954; Charisma (Cavotera) simplex (Laseron, 1954)

Species of gastropod

Charisma simplex is a species of extremely small sea snail, a marine gastropod mollusk belonging to the family Trochidae, commonly known as top snails.

== Description ==
The height of the shell is 1 mm. The shell is a "depressed turbinate" and has a complete peristome.

== Distribution ==
This marine species is endemic to Australia, specifically found in the coastal waters off New South Wales.
