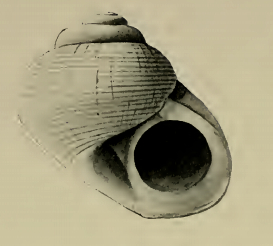
- Original image of a shell of Charisma compacta

Scientific classification
- Kingdom: Animalia
- Phylum: Mollusca
- Class: Gastropoda
- Subclass: Vetigastropoda
- Order: Trochida
- Superfamily: Trochoidea
- Family: Trochidae
- Genus: Charisma; Hedley, 1915

Type species
- Charisma compacta Hedley, C., 1915

Synonyms
- Cavotera Laseron, 1954; Cavostella Laseron, 1954

= Charisma (gastropod) =

Genus of gastropods

Charisma is a genus of sea snails, marine gastropod mollusks in the family Trochidae, the top snails.

== Description ==
A genus related to Liotia, but without a varix to the outer lip. The species are few-whorled and spirally sculptured. Their umbilicus has an internal funicle. The operculum is corneous, concave, multispiral, with a spiral frilled lamella.

== Species ==
- Charisma arenacea (Pritchard, G.B. & J.H. Gatliff, 1902)
- Charisma candida (A. Adams, 1861)
- Charisma carinata (Verco, J.C., 1907)
- Charisma compacta Hedley, C., 1915
- Charisma josephi (Tenison-Woods, J.E., 1877)
- Charisma latebrosa (Hedley, C., 1907)
- Charisma radians (Laseron, 1954)
- Charisma simplex (Laseron, 1954)
