= Cantrainea peloritana =

Scientific classification
- Kingdom: Animalia
- Phylum: Mollusca
- Class: Gastropoda
- Subclass: Vetigastropoda
- Order: Trochida
- Family: Colloniidae
- Genus: Cantrainea
- Species: C. peloritana

Binomial name
- Cantrainea peloritana (Cantraine, 1835)

Synonyms
- Turbo peloritanus Cantraine, 1835

Species of gastropod

Cantrainea peloritana is a species of sea snail, a marine gastropod mollusc in the family Colloniidae.

== Description ==
The height of the shell varies between 5 mm and 20 mm.

Cantrainea peloritana lives in the bathyal zone at depths between 545m and 1300m. In the Mediterranean it lives on white coral and in the Atlantic it lives on sand or gravel.

It feeds by eating detritus and grazing.

== Distribution ==
This marine species occurs in the Bay of Biscayne and in the Mediterranean Sea.
