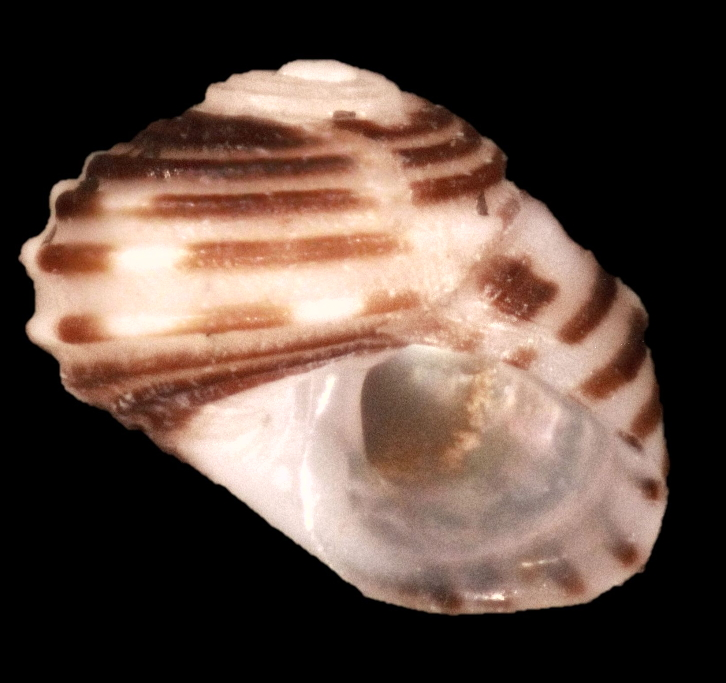
- Shell of Argalista tapparonei (specimen at Naturalis Biodiversity Center)

Scientific classification
- Kingdom: Animalia
- Phylum: Mollusca
- Class: Gastropoda
- Subclass: Vetigastropoda
- Order: Trochida
- Superfamily: Trochoidea
- Family: Colloniidae
- Subfamily: Colloniinae
- Genus: Argalista
- Species: A. tapparonei

Binomial name
- Argalista tapparonei (Caramagna, 1888)

Synonyms
- Collonista tapparonei (Caramagna, 1888) superseded combination; Gibbula tapparonei Caramagna, 1888 superseded combination (original combination); Homalopoma tapparonei (Caramagna, 1888) superseded combination

= Argalista tapparonei =

Species of gastropod

Argalista tapparonei is a species of small sea snail with calcareous opercula, a marine gastropod mollusk in the family Colloniidae.

== Description ==
(Original description in Latin) The shell is small, turbinate (top-shaped), and rather thick. The spire is small and obtuse (blunt), with the apex sub-mamillate (nipple-like). There are about 4 whorls, of which the first two are smooth, growing rather rapidly; the rest are convex, adorned with spiral cords.

The cords are rib-like, rounded, regular, and equal to the spaces between them, and they are decorated with blood-red spots. The spots are intermittently (here and there) interrupted, sometimes disposed in sub-regular axial rows, but they are more obscure in the posterior region of the body whorl. The spaces between the cords are deep, furrow-like, and white.

The body whorl is more produced than the spire. It is quite inflated, rounded at the periphery, depressed at the base, and umbilicate. The umbilicus is very narrow, white, and surrounded by a white zone.

The aperture is oblique, rounded, and simple. It is furnished with a slightly thickened peristome (lip); internally it is sometimes white, sometimes painted similarly to the exterior. The sutures are slightly impressed and simple.

== Distribution ==
This species occurs in the Eritrean part of the Red Sea.
