= Argalista roseopunctata =

Scientific classification
- Kingdom: Animalia
- Phylum: Mollusca
- Class: Gastropoda
- Subclass: Vetigastropoda
- Order: Trochida
- Superfamily: Trochoidea
- Family: Colloniidae
- Subfamily: Colloniinae
- Genus: Argalista
- Species: A. roseopunctata

Binomial name
- Argalista roseopunctata (Angas, 1880)

Species of gastropod

Argalista roseopunctata is a species of small sea snail with calcareous opercula, a marine gastropod mollusk in the family Colloniidae.
