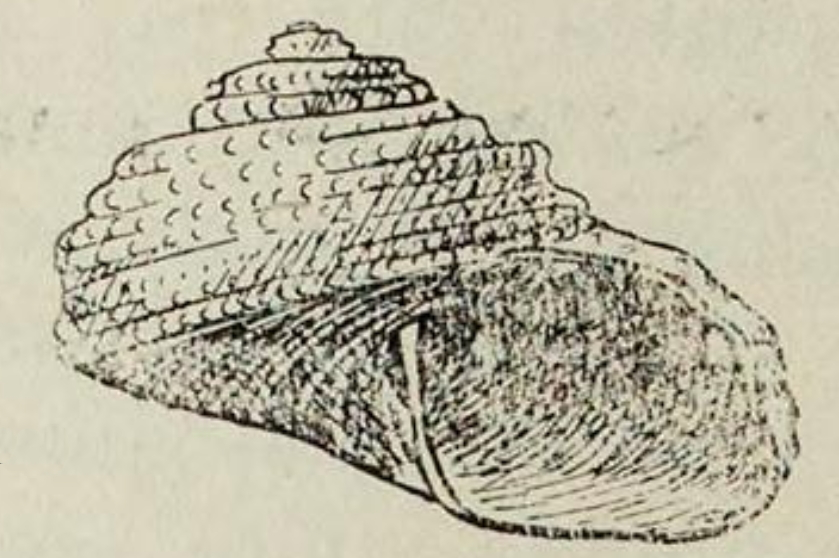
- Drawing of a shell of Argalista corallina (holotype)

Scientific classification
- Kingdom: Animalia
- Phylum: Mollusca
- Class: Gastropoda
- Subclass: Vetigastropoda
- Order: Trochida
- Superfamily: Trochoidea
- Family: Colloniidae
- Subfamily: Colloniinae
- Genus: Argalista
- Species: A. corallina

Binomial name
- Argalista corallina (Cotton & Godfrey, 1935)

Synonyms
- Gibbula corallina Cotton & Godfrey, 1935 (superseded combination); Minolops corallinus (Cotton & Godfrey, 1935) superseded combination; Spectamen corallinum (Cotton & Godfrey, 1935) (superseded combination)

= Argalista corallina =

Species of gastropod

Argalista corallina, common name the coral-red gibbula, is a species of small sea snail with calcareous opercula, a marine gastropod mollusk in the family Colloniidae.

== Description ==
The length of the shell is 3 mm, its diameter 3.3 mm.

(Original description) The shell is turbinate, depressed, and umbilicate. It is coral-red above, with a creamy white base. The whorls are rounded, and the periphery is angulated. The shell is sculptured with seven spiral lirae, including the peripheral lira. The alternate lirae are larger and granulated. The surface also features sublenticular, very slightly oblique radial striae. There are eight equal basal cords. The sutures are open and canaliculate. The columella is only slightly curved, and the umbilicus is narrow.

== Distribution ==
This marine species is endemic to Australia and occurs off South Australia and Western Australia.
