= Argalista amakusaensis =

Scientific classification
- Kingdom: Animalia
- Phylum: Mollusca
- Class: Gastropoda
- Subclass: Vetigastropoda
- Order: Trochida
- Superfamily: Trochoidea
- Family: Colloniidae
- Subfamily: Colloniinae
- Genus: Argalista
- Species: A. amakusaensis

Binomial name
- Argalista amakusaensis (T. Habe, 1960)

Synonyms
- Collonista amakusaensis T. Habe, 1960 superseded combination

Species of gastropod

Argalista amakusaensis, common name the coral-red gibbula, is a species of small sea snail with calcareous opercula, a marine gastropod mollusk in the family Colloniidae.

== Description ==
The length of the shell attains 4.3 mm, its diameter is 3.8 mm.

== Distribution ==
This marine species occurs off Kyushu, Japan.
