= Leptothyra kermadecensis =

Scientific classification
- Kingdom: Animalia
- Phylum: Mollusca
- Class: Gastropoda
- Subclass: Vetigastropoda
- Order: Trochida
- Superfamily: Trochoidea
- Family: Colloniidae
- Subfamily: Colloniinae
- Genus: Leptothyra
- Species: L. kermadecensis

Binomial name
- Leptothyra kermadecensis Marshall, 1979

Synonyms
- Leptothyra picta Marshall, B.A, 1979

Species of gastropod

Leptothyra kermadecensis is a species of small sea snail with calcareous opercula, a marine gastropod mollusk in the family Colloniidae.

== Distribution ==
This marine species is endemic off the Kermadec Ridge, New Zealand.
