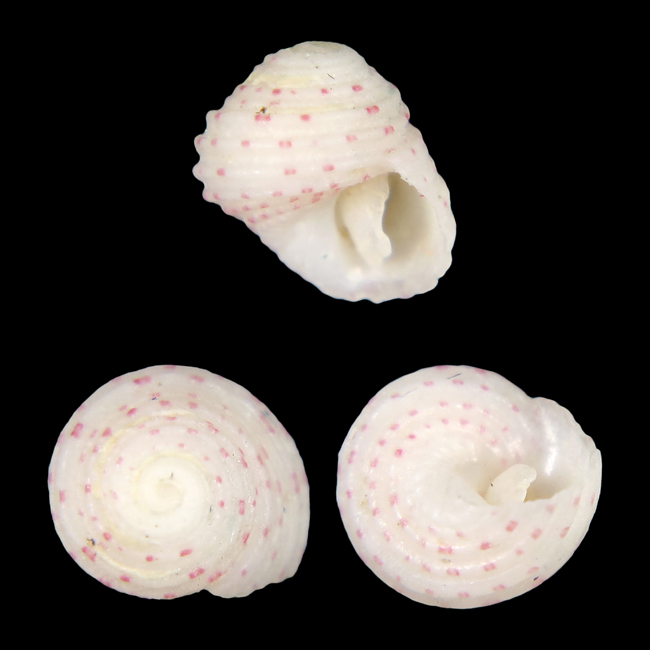

Scientific classification
- Kingdom: Animalia
- Phylum: Mollusca
- Class: Gastropoda
- Subclass: Vetigastropoda
- Order: Trochida
- Family: Colloniidae
- Genus: Collonista
- Species: C. kreipli

Binomial name
- Collonista kreipli Poppe, Tagaro & Stahlschmidt, 2015

= Collonista kreipli =

Species of gastropod

Collonista kreipli is a species of sea snail, a marine gastropod mollusk in the family Colloniidae.

== Original description ==
- Poppe G.T., Tagaro S.P. & Stahlschmidt P. (2015). New shelled molluscan species from the central Philippines I. Visaya. 4(3): 15-59 page(s): 20, pl. 4 figs 1–3.
