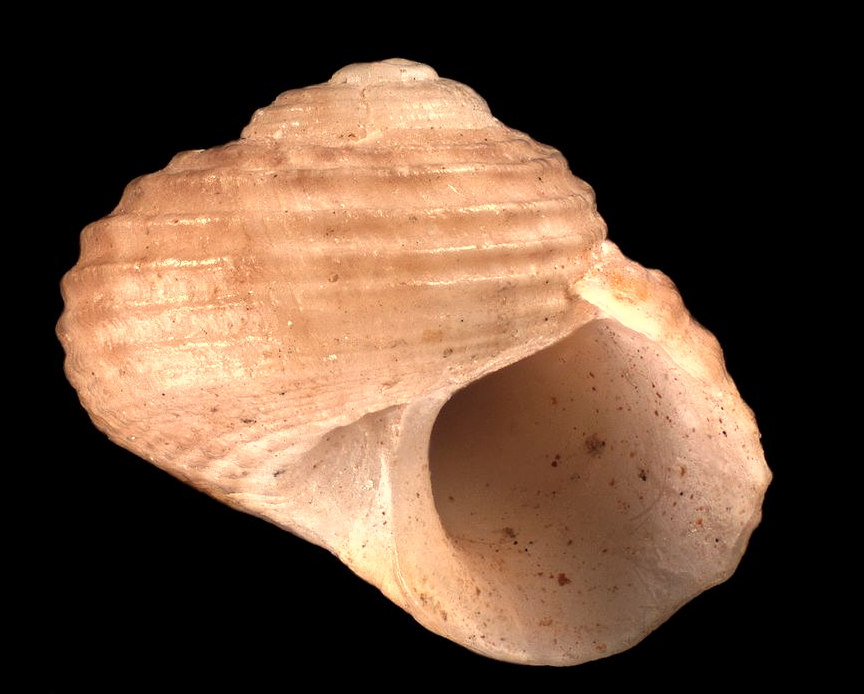
- Shell of Argalista crassicostata (specimen in the Museum of New Zealand)

Scientific classification
- Kingdom: Animalia
- Phylum: Mollusca
- Class: Gastropoda
- Subclass: Vetigastropoda
- Order: Trochida
- Superfamily: Trochoidea
- Family: Colloniidae
- Subfamily: Colloniinae
- Genus: Argalista
- Species: A. crassicostata

Binomial name
- Argalista crassicostata (Murdoch, 1905)

Synonyms
- Leptothyra crassicostata Murdoch, 1905 superseded combination

= Argalista crassicostata =

Species of gastropod

Argalista crassicostata is a species of small sea snail with calcareous opercula, a marine gastropod mollusk in the family Colloniidae.

== Description ==
The length of the shell attains 2.49 mm, its diameter 3.21 mm.

(Original description) The shell is small, solid, and turbinate, with strong and variable spiral sculpture. Its colour is whitish or light brown, occasionally with irregular markings of brown, which are most distinct on and below the periphery. There are 4 whorls, the spire is short, and the apex is minute and without sculpture. The penultimate whorl bears three to five, and the body whorl twelve to twenty, spiral ribs, four to nine of which are in front of the aperture.

The ribs are very variable in size; there are five to eight strong riblets between the periphery and the suture on the outer lip. In front of the aperture, four or five riblets are about equal to the breadth of the interspaces. The riblets on and immediately below the periphery are frequently small and crowded, similar to those on the base, or there may be two or three more prominent ribs intercalated with the smaller spirals, or the basal riblets may be generally stronger than those on the periphery.

The growth lines are strong and irregular, producing here and there a lightly costate appearance, frequently pronounced in the umbilical area. The sutures are impressed. The aperture is subrotund. The outer lip is sharp, descending, rather sharply in some specimens. The columella is lightly curved, somewhat produced and expanded anteriorly, with a thick posterior callus spreading across to the outer lip. The umbilicus is small and deep. The operculum is circular, somewhat calcareous, and composed of six or seven narrow whorls or spirals.

== Distribution ==
This marine species is endemic to New Zealand and occurs off South Island, Stewart Island and Snares Islands.
