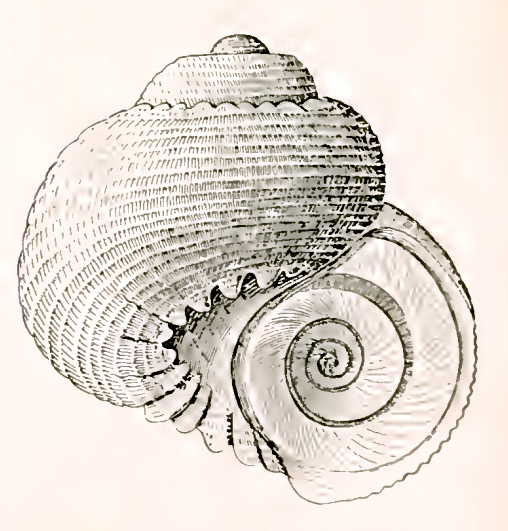
- Original image of a shell of Charisma latebrosa

Scientific classification
- Kingdom: Animalia
- Phylum: Mollusca
- Class: Gastropoda
- Subclass: Vetigastropoda
- Order: Trochida
- Superfamily: Trochoidea
- Family: Trochidae
- Genus: Charisma
- Species: C. latebrosa

Binomial name
- Charisma latebrosa (Hedley, 1907)

Synonyms
- Liotia latebrosa Hedley, 1907

= Charisma latebrosa =

Species of gastropod

Charisma latebrosa is a species of extremely small sea snail, a marine gastropod mollusk in the family Trochidae, the top snails.

== Description ==
The height of the shell is 1.35 mm, its diameter 1.45 mm. The small, buff shell is globose and perforate. The three whorls are flattened beneath the suture, thence rounded to the base. Its sculpture shows about twenty radial puckers that undulate the summit of the body whorl, but disappear before reaching the periphery. Around the umbilicus about a dozen similar radial riblets are disposed. Fine close spiral threads parted by grooves of equal height and breadth ornament the entire surface. The simple aperture is subcircular, slightly angled anteriorly and posteriorly. The umbilicus is deep and narrow. The operculum is externally concave, shelly and multispiral. Its whorls answer to those of the shell, parted by a deep sutural furrow and radially sculptured by irregular raised lines.

== Distribution ==
This marine species is endemic to Australia and occurs off Queensland. The presence off New South Wales is uncertain.
