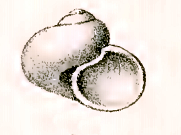
- Drawing of a shell of Charisma josephi

Scientific classification
- Kingdom: Animalia
- Phylum: Mollusca
- Class: Gastropoda
- Subclass: Vetigastropoda
- Order: Trochida
- Superfamily: Trochoidea
- Family: Trochidae
- Genus: Charisma
- Species: C. josephi

Binomial name
- Charisma josephi (Tenison-Woods, 1877)

Synonyms
- Cyclostrema josephi Tenison Woods, 1877

= Charisma josephi =

Species of gastropod

Charisma josephi, common name the Joseph's charisma, is a species of extremely small sea snail, a marine gastropod mollusk in the family Trochidae, the top snails.

== Description ==
The diameter of the shell is 3 mm. The thick shell is widely umbilicated and obliquely turbinate. Its color is white, opaque, maculated with very pale chestnut. The five whorls are rounded and closely spirally striate. The thick peristome is posteriorly produced.

== Distribution ==
This marine species is endemic to Australia and occurs off South Australia, Tasmania, Victoria and Western Australia
