= Collonista costulosa =

Scientific classification
- Kingdom: Animalia
- Phylum: Mollusca
- Class: Gastropoda
- Subclass: Vetigastropoda
- Order: Trochida
- Family: Colloniidae
- Genus: Collonista
- Species: C. costulosa

Binomial name
- Collonista costulosa (Sowerby II, 1886)

Species of gastropod

Collonista costulosa is a species of sea snail, a marine gastropod mollusk in the family Colloniidae.

== Description ==
The height of the shell reaches 4 to 6 mm.

== Distribution ==
This marine species occurs off the coast of Japan.
