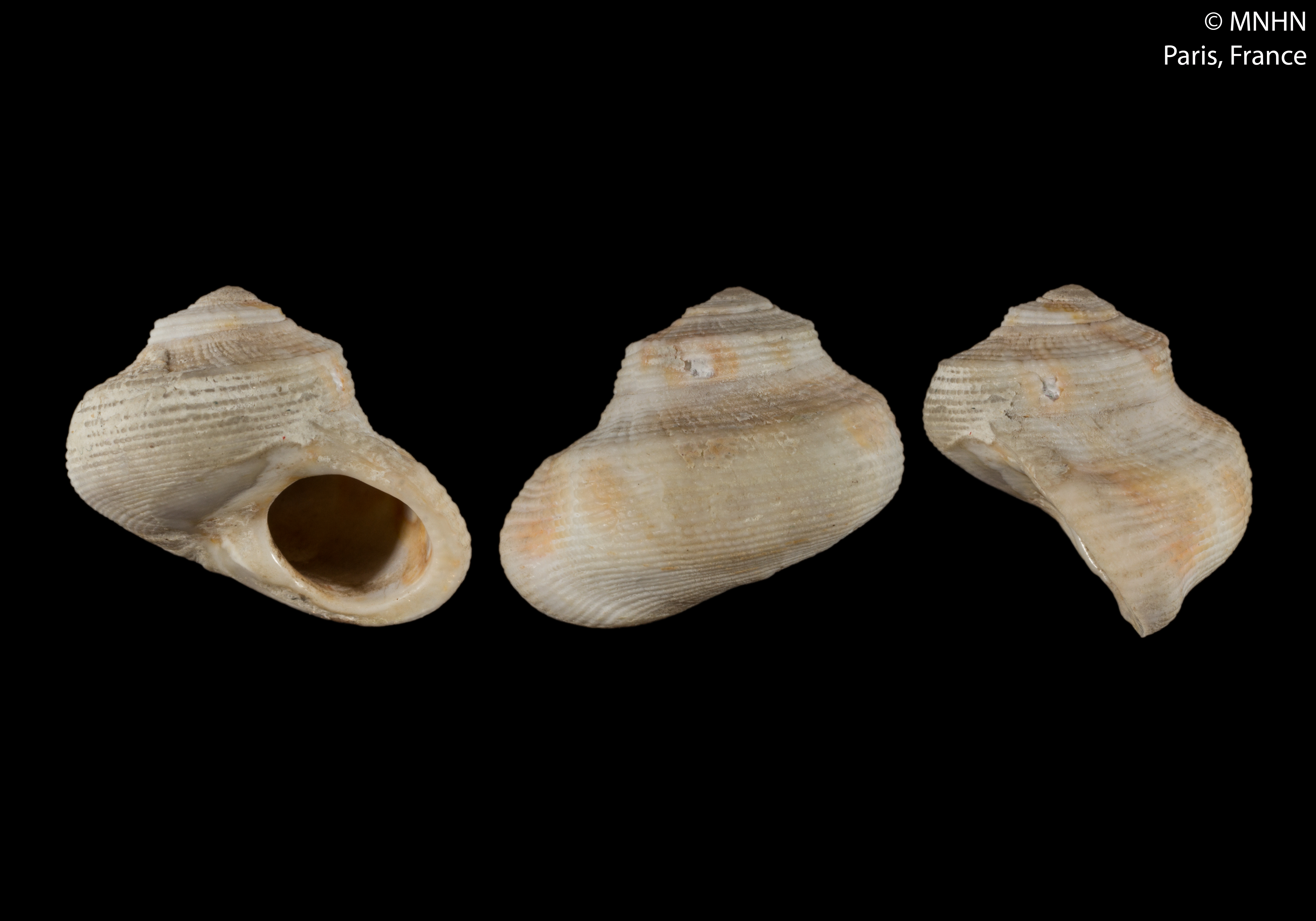
- Shell of Cantrainea yoyottei (holotype at MNHN, Paris)

Scientific classification
- Kingdom: Animalia
- Phylum: Mollusca
- Class: Gastropoda
- Subclass: Vetigastropoda
- Order: Trochida
- Family: Colloniidae
- Genus: Cantrainea
- Species: C. yoyottei

Binomial name
- Cantrainea yoyottei Vilvens, 2001

= Cantrainea yoyottei =

Species of gastropod

Cantrainea yoyottei is a species of sea snail, a marine gastropod mollusk in the family Colloniidae.

== Description ==
The shell grows to a height of 23 mm.

== Distribution ==
This marine species occurs in the Lesser Antilles off Guadeloupe.
