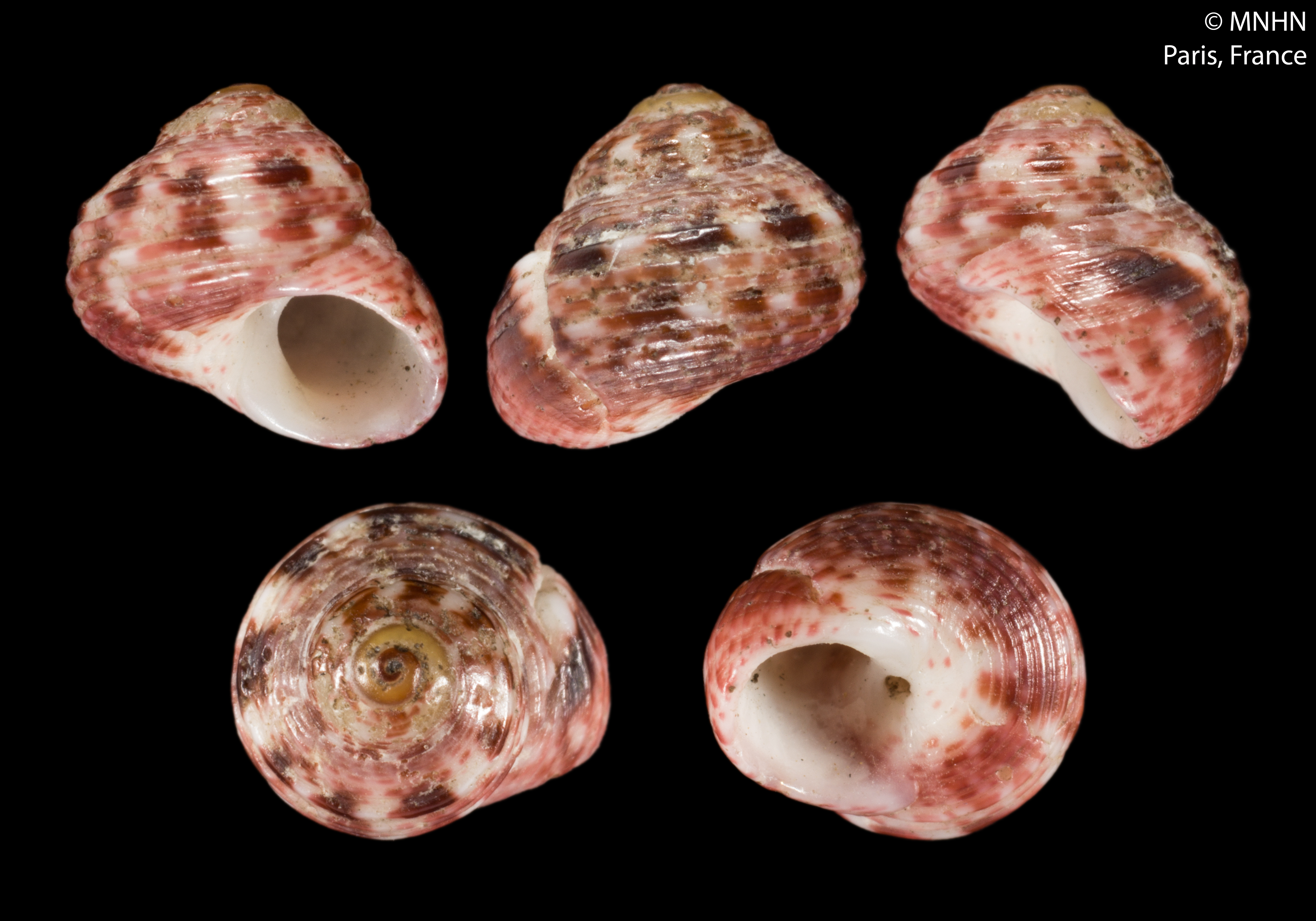
- A number of shells of Leptothyra filifer (syntype at MNHN, Paris)

Scientific classification
- Kingdom: Animalia
- Phylum: Mollusca
- Class: Gastropoda
- Subclass: Vetigastropoda
- Order: Trochida
- Family: Colloniidae
- Genus: Leptothyra
- Species: L. filifer

Binomial name
- Leptothyra filifer (Deshayes, 1863)

Synonyms
- Collonista filifera (Deshayes, 1863); Turbo filifer Deshayes, 1863

= Leptothyra filifer =

Species of gastropod

Leptothyra filifer is a species of sea snail, a marine gastropod mollusc in the family Colloniidae.

== Description ==
The size of the shell varies between 3 mm and 8 mm.

== Distribution ==
This species occurs in the Indian Ocean.
