= Charisma candida =

Scientific classification
- Kingdom: Animalia
- Phylum: Mollusca
- Class: Gastropoda
- Subclass: Vetigastropoda
- Order: Trochida
- Superfamily: Trochoidea
- Family: Trochidae
- Genus: Charisma
- Species: C. candida

Binomial name
- Charisma candida (A. Adams, 1861)

Synonyms
- Charisma (Cavostella) candida (A. Adams, 1861); Pseudosetia candida (A. Adams, 1861) superseded combination; Setia candida A. Adams, 1861 (original combination)

Species of gastropod

Charisma candida is a species of extremely small sea snail, a marine gastropod mollusk in the family Trochidae, the top snails.

== Description ==
(original description in Latin) The shell is ovate-conoidal in shape and narrowly rimate. It is white, smooth and glossy, and scarcely opaque. It consists of four and a half convex whorls, and has a nearly circular aperture with a thin, arched lip.

== Distribution ==
This marine species occurs off Japan.
