= Cantrainea sunderlandi =

Scientific classification
- Kingdom: Animalia
- Phylum: Mollusca
- Class: Gastropoda
- Subclass: Vetigastropoda
- Order: Trochida
- Family: Colloniidae
- Genus: Cantrainea
- Species: C. sunderlandi

Binomial name
- Cantrainea sunderlandi (Petuch, 1987)

Synonyms
- Bolma sunderlandi Petuch, 1987

Species of gastropod

Cantrainea sunderlandi is a species of small sea snail with calcareous opercula, a marine gastropod mollusk in the family Colloniidae.

== Description ==
Original description: "Shell thick, solid, turbinate in shape; spire elevated with stepped appearance; shoulder very sharply angled, carinated; area between shoulder carina and suture flattened, distinctly tabulate; body whorls and spire whorls sculptured with numerous fine, smooth, spiral threads; outer edge of lip thickened, flaring; columella and base well-developed, white in color; interior and periphery of aperture nacreous; shell color pale straw-tan; operculum oval, smooth, shelly, white in color."

The shell grows to a height of 16 mm.

== Distribution ==
Locus typicus: "Roatan Island, Honduras."

This species occurs in the Caribbean Sea off Honduras.
