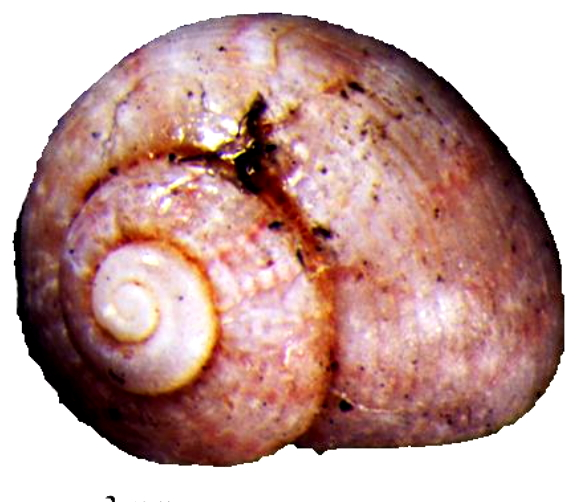
- Shell of Argalista kingensis (specimen at the Tasmanian Museum and Art Gallery)

Scientific classification
- Kingdom: Animalia
- Phylum: Mollusca
- Class: Gastropoda
- Subclass: Vetigastropoda
- Order: Trochida
- Superfamily: Trochoidea
- Family: Colloniidae
- Subfamily: Colloniinae
- Genus: Argalista
- Species: A. kingensis

Binomial name
- Argalista kingensis May, 1923

Synonyms
- Neocollonia kingicola [sic] ·

= Argalista kingensis =

Species of gastropod

Argalista kingensis is a species of small sea snail with calcareous opercula, a marine gastropod mollusk in the family Colloniidae.

== Distribution ==
This marine species is endemic to Australia and occurs in Bass Strait, Tasmania.
