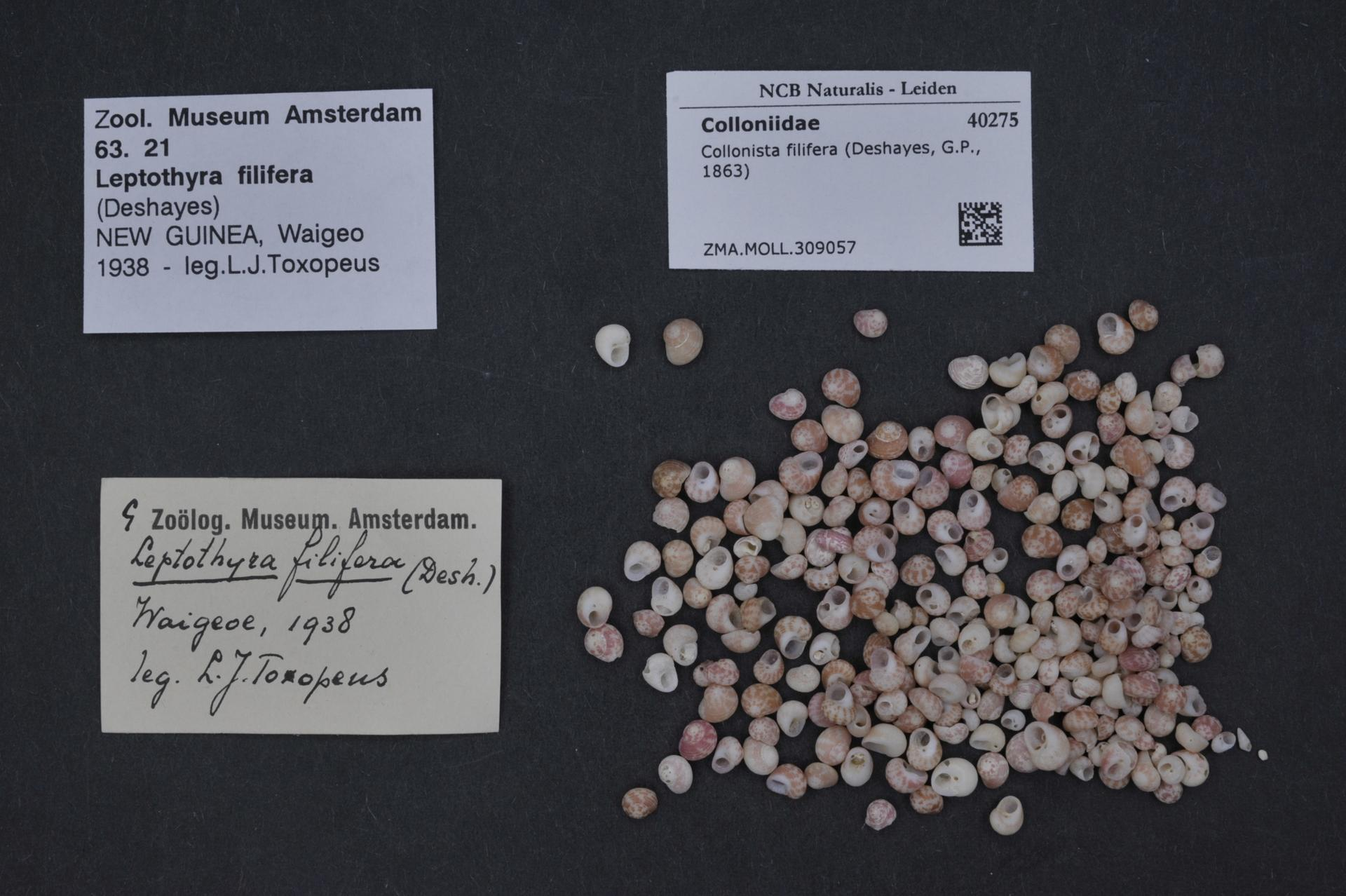
- Collonista filifera

Scientific classification
- Kingdom: Animalia
- Phylum: Mollusca
- Class: Gastropoda
- Subclass: Vetigastropoda
- Order: Trochida
- Family: Colloniidae
- Subfamily: Colloniinae
- Genus: Collonista; Iredale, 1918

Type species
- Collonia picta Pease, 1868

Synonyms
- Leptothyra Pease, 1869

= Collonista =

Genus of gastropods

Collonista is a genus of sea snails in the family Colloniidae.

== Species ==
As of 2020, the World Register of Marine Species accepts 20 species within the genus Collonista:

- Collonista amakusaensis Habe, 1960
- Collonista arsinoensis (Issel, 1869)
- Collonista costulosa (Sowerby II, 1886)
- Collonista crassilirata (Preston, 1909)
- Collonista delecta (E. A. Smith, 1899)
- Collonista eroopolitana (Issel, 1869)
- Collonista glareosa (Gould, 1861)
- Collonista granulosa (Pease, 1868)
- Collonista hoatkoe S.-I Huang, I-F. Fu & K.-H. Hu, 2019
- Collonista imperforata (Suter, 1908)
- Collonista jucunda (Thiele, 1925)
- Collonista kreipli Poppe, Tagaro & Stahlschmidt, 2015
- Collonista lenticula (Gould, 1861)
- Collonista miltochrista (Melvill, 1918)
- Collonista nivalis Poppe & Tagaro, 2026
- Collonista picta (Pease, 1868)
- Collonista purpurata (Deshayes, 1863)
- Collonista rubricincta (Mighels, 1845)
- Collonista solida (Preston, 1908)
- Collonista thachi S.-I Huang, I.-F. Fu & Poppe, 2016
- Collonista verruca (Gould, 1845)
- Collonista viridula (Sowerby III, 1900)
