= Leptothyra grossa =

Scientific classification
- Kingdom: Animalia
- Phylum: Mollusca
- Class: Gastropoda
- Subclass: Vetigastropoda
- Order: Trochida
- Superfamily: Trochoidea
- Family: Colloniidae
- Subfamily: Colloniinae
- Genus: Leptothyra
- Species: L. grossa

Binomial name
- Leptothyra grossa Feng, 1996

Species of gastropod

Leptothyra grossa is a species of small sea snail with calcareous opercula, a marine gastropod mollusk in the family Colloniidae.

== Distribution ==
This marine species occurs off China
