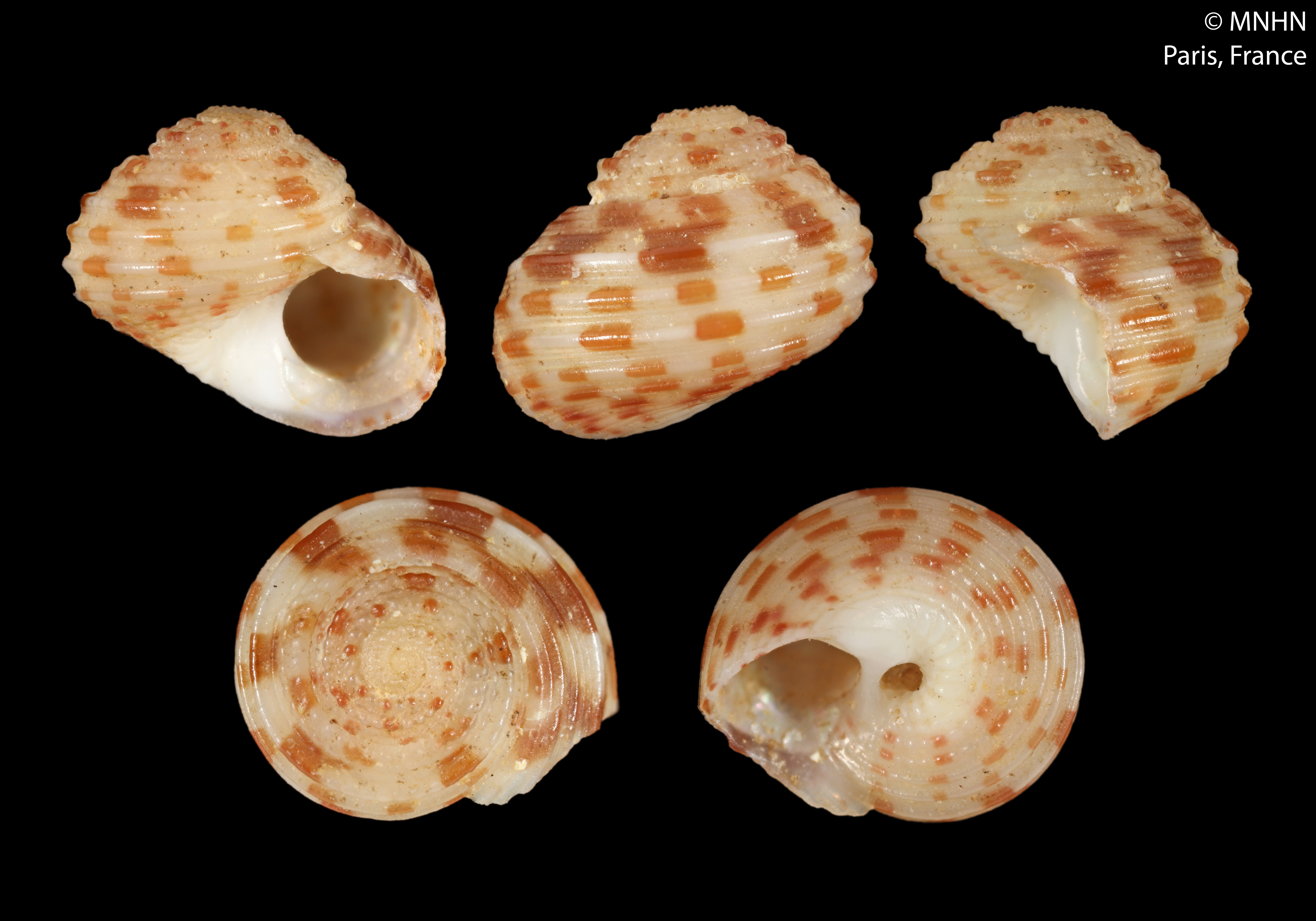
- Shell of Collonista arsinoensis (syntype at MNHN, Paris)

Scientific classification
- Kingdom: Animalia
- Phylum: Mollusca
- Class: Gastropoda
- Subclass: Vetigastropoda
- Order: Trochida
- Family: Colloniidae
- Genus: Collonista
- Species: C. arsinoensis

Binomial name
- Collonista arsinoensis (Issel, 1869)

Synonyms
- Homalopoma arsinoense (Issel, 1869); Turbo arsinoensis Issel, 1869 (original combination)

= Collonista arsinoensis =

Species of gastropod

Collonista arsinoensis is a species of sea snail, a marine gastropod mollusk in the family Colloniidae.

== Distribution ==
This species occurs in the Red Sea.
