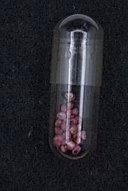
- A collection of tiny shells of Collonista rubricincta (museum specimens at Naturalis Biodiversity Center)

Scientific classification
- Kingdom: Animalia
- Phylum: Mollusca
- Class: Gastropoda
- Subclass: Vetigastropoda
- Order: Trochida
- Family: Colloniidae
- Genus: Collonista
- Species: C. rubricincta

Binomial name
- Collonista rubricincta (Mighels, 1845)

Synonyms
- Collonia multistriata (Pse.) Sowerby; Collonia rubrilineata (Pse.) Sowerby; Leptothyra rubricincta (Mighels, 1845); Leptothyra rubrilineata (Garrett) v. Martens; Turbo multilineata Garrett, 1857; Turbo rubricinctus Mighels, 1845 (original combination)

= Collonista rubricincta =

Species of gastropod

Collonista rubricincta is a species of small sea snail with calcareous opercula, a marine gastropod mollusc in the family Colloniidae.

== Description ==
The shell is minute with a shell size of 2.2 mm. It has a depressed-globose shape and is perforate. The spire is short. The apex is obtuse. There are four convex whorls, encircled by coarse white spiral ribs. The interstices are deep red. The base of the shell is smooth, with concentric red stripes. The large aperture is rounded and oblique. The umbilicus is narrow. Some specimens are beaded below the sutures, and there is some variation in the width of the umbilical perforation. The revolving ribs are sometimes obsolete. There are usually eight ribs to double that number on the body whorl.

== Distribution ==
This marine species occurs in the Indo-West Pacific.
