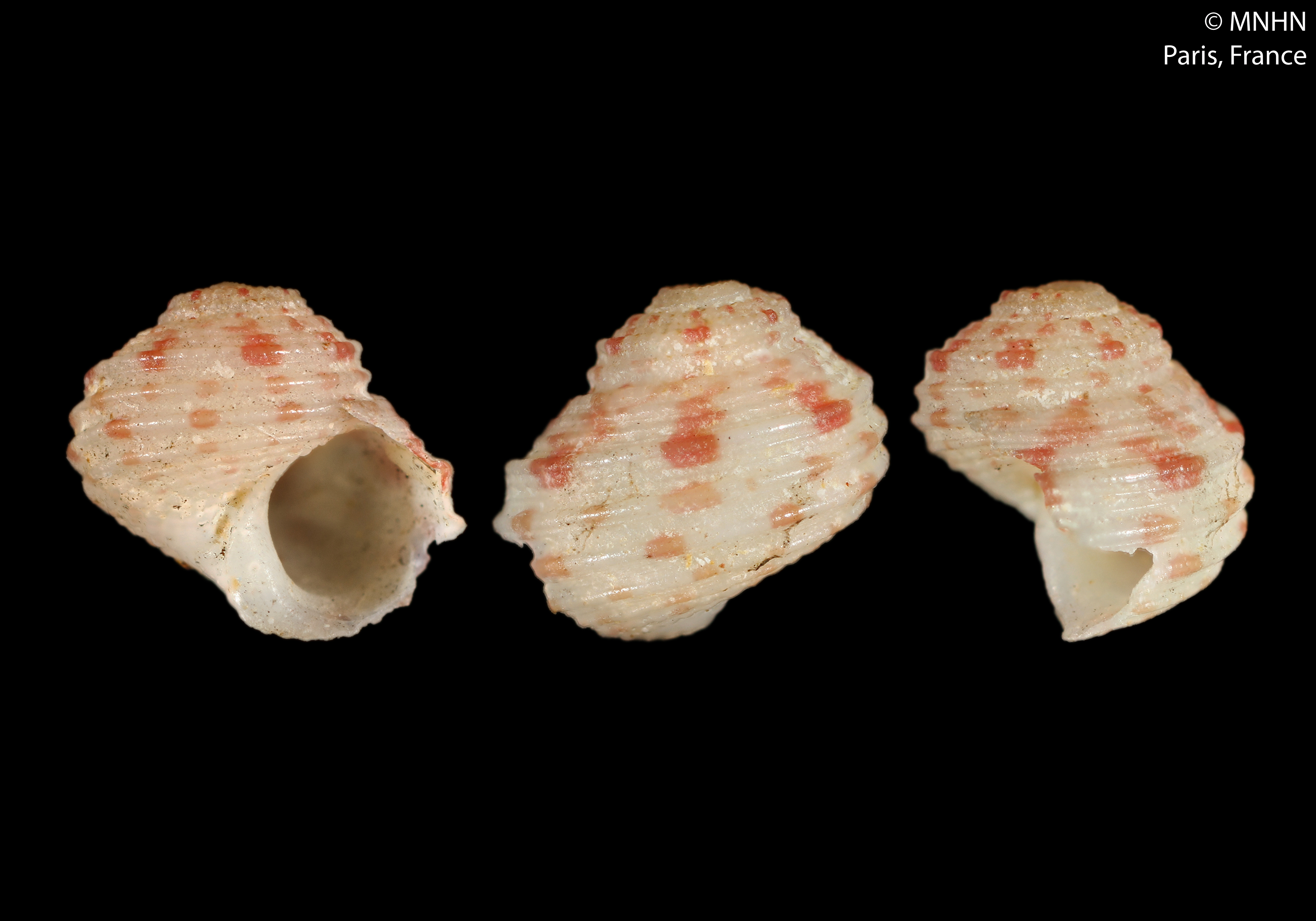
- Shell of Leptothyra eroopolitana (syntype at MNHN, Paris)

Scientific classification
- Kingdom: Animalia
- Phylum: Mollusca
- Class: Gastropoda
- Subclass: Vetigastropoda
- Order: Trochida
- Family: Colloniidae
- Genus: Collonista
- Species: C. eroopolitana

Binomial name
- Collonista eroopolitana (Issel, 1869)

Synonyms
- Leptothyra eroopolitana (Issel, 1869); Turbo eroopolitanus Issel, 1869 (original combination)

= Collonista eroopolitana =

Species of gastropod

Collonista eroopolitana is a species of sea snail, a marine gastropod mollusk in the family Colloniidae.

== Description ==
The length of the shell attains 3 mm.

== Distribution ==
This species occurs in the Red Sea and in the Gulf of Aden.
