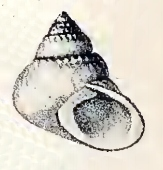
- Drawing of a shell of Homalopoma indutum

Scientific classification
- Kingdom: Animalia
- Phylum: Mollusca
- Class: Gastropoda
- Subclass: Vetigastropoda
- Order: Trochida
- Superfamily: Trochoidea
- Family: Colloniidae
- Subfamily: Colloniinae
- Genus: Homalopoma
- Species: H. indutum

Binomial name
- Homalopoma indutum (Watson, 1879)

Synonyms
- Leptothyra induta Watson, 1879; Leptothyra induta var. insculpta Dall, 1889; Leptothyra induta var. tincta Dall, 1889; Leptothyra insculpta Dall, W.H., 1889; Leptothyra tincta Dall, W.H., 1889; Turbo indutus Watson, 1879

= Homalopoma indutum =

Species of gastropod

Homalopoma indutum, common name the two-faced dwarf turban, is a species of small sea snail with calcareous opercula, a marine gastropod mollusk in the family Colloniidae.

== Description ==
The white-glossy shell grows to a height of 6.9 mm. The small shell has a conoidal shape. The whorls are tumid. The base is flattened. The whole surface is faintly marked with remote spiral threads, and very faintly scratched with closer microscopic striae. The whorls are bluntly angulated in the middle, and the last is so, besides, at the base below the periphery. This angulation meets the outer lip. The second and third whorls have two or three strong spiral threads. There are very many close unequal oblique lines of growth. Of these, the strongest rise in close-set infra-sutural puckerings, which on the third whorl resemble small beads. There is a glossy, thin ivory-white calcareous coat over a brilliant pearly white layer. The spire is high and fine-pointed. The apex is blunt, the smooth rounded 1½ whorl is scarcely projecting. There are six tumid whorls increasing rapidly. The penultimate whorl rises swollen out of the suture. The base of the shell is a little flattened. The suture is linear, not impressed, a little coarse, slightly marginated by the overlap of the succeeding on the preceding whorl and the slight tumidity caused by the infra-sutural puckerings. The round aperture is very oblique, with a soft pearly nacre all round. The outer lip is very slightly descending, thick, and bevelled outwards to a sharp edge. There is a broad thin hyaline pad spread over the body that connects the outer lip and the columella, which is broad, thick, shallowly excavated, with a slight external median horizontal tooth or ridge. The edge is reverted and closely appressed. The thin, calcareous operculum is small. It is flat, convex on the inside, where it shows 7½ whorls. The body whorl begins suddenly to enlarge close to its end.

== Distribution ==
This species occurs in the Atlantic Ocean off North Carolina, USA;, and Puerto Rico.
