= Rodela =

Rodela may refer to:

- Rodela, a type of round shield similar to a buckler, used by Rodeleros

== People with the surname ==
- David Rodela (born 1982), American boxer
- Jose Rodela (born 1937), United States Army soldier and Medal of Honor recipient

== See also ==
- Cova Rodela, a village of Brava, Cape Verde
- Rodelas, a municipality in Bahia, Brazil
