= Shell Rotella =

Brand of heavy-duty engine lubricant

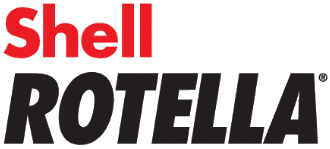
- Product type: Diesel engine lubricants
- Current owner: Shell plc
- Produced by: Shell plc
- Country: Netherlands
- Website: rotella.shell.com

Shell Rotella is a line of heavy-duty engine lubrication products produced by Shell plc. The line includes engine oils, gear oils and coolants. The oil carries both the American Petroleum Institute (API) diesel "C" rating as well as the API gasoline engine "S" rating. Ratings differ based on the oil. Rotella oils, like the T3 15W-40, meet both the API CJ-4 and SM specifications, and may be used in both gasoline and diesel engines. However, it is formulated specifically for vehicles without catalytic converters, containing phosphorus levels beyond the 600–800 ppm range. Therefore, Rotella is not recommended for gasoline vehicles with catalytic converters due to the higher risk of damaging these emission controls. Newer formulations of Rotella T6 however are API SM rated as safe for pre-2011 gasoline vehicles.

== Product lineup ==
The Rotella product family is categorized by Shell into the following product families:

- Engine oils
- Coolants
- Tractor fluid (a universal transmission, gear, hydraulic, and wet brake fluid)
- Gear oil

In the engine oil family, there are four basic oil sub-families:

- Multigrade conventional oil—in SAE 10W-30 and 15W-40 viscosity ranges
- Multigrade synthetic oil—in SAE 5W-40 and 15w-40 viscosity ranges
- Single grade conventional oil—in SAE 20, 30, 40 and 50
- Synthetic blend oil

Shell is marketing their new CJ-4/SM oil as "Triple Protection," meaning it provides enhanced qualities for engine wear, soot control and engine cleanliness. Shell's Rotella website indicates that on-road testing confirms the new Triple Protection technology produces better anti-wear characteristics than their existing CI-4+ rated Rotella oil. This is achieved despite a lower zinc and phosphorus additive level as called for by the API CJ-4 specification. (The 15W-40 Rotella T with Triple Protection oil has approximately 1200 ppm of zinc and 1100 ppm phosphorus at the time of manufacture.)

The Shell Rimula brand is multi-national and comparable in all aspects, including the classification names. (i.e. T-5, T-6, Etc.)

== Competitors ==
Rotella competes with similar lubrication products from other oil manufacturers. Some notable competitive products are:

- ConocoPhillips 76 Lubricants Guardol ECT with Liquid Titanium
- Mobil Delvac
- Chevron Delo
- Petro-Canada Duron
- CITGO Citgard
- Petrol Ofisi Maximus
- Royal Purple
- Valvoline Premium Blue
- Castrol Tection

== Motorcycle usage ==
Though marketed as an engine oil for diesel trucks, Rotella oil has found popularity with motorcyclists as well. The lack of "friction modifiers" in Rotella means they do not interfere with wet clutch operations. This is called a "shared sump" design, which is unlike automobiles which maintain separate oil reservoirs – one for the engine and one for the transmission. Used oil analysis reports on BobIsTheOilGuy.com have shown wear metals levels comparable to oils marketed as motorcycle-specific.

== Older cars ==
Rotella oil is ideal for older cars without catalytic converters and for which zinc was a requirement at the time for engine oil. It eliminates the need for adding a zinc additive to modern oils.

=== JASO-MA ===
Both Rotella T4 15W-40 conventional and, Rotella T6 5W-40 and 15w-40 Synthetic both list the JASO MA/MA 2 standard; this information can be found on the bottle adjacent to the SAE/API rating stamp. JASO is an acronym that stands for Japanese Automotive Standards Organization. Note that the 10W-30 conventional oil does not list JASO-MA.

== Use in Passenger and turbocharged cars ==
Likewise with motorcycles, though marketed as an engine oil for diesel trucks, Rotella T6 5W-40 synthetic oil has also found popularity with drivers and tuners of gasoline powered vehicles that utilize turbocharging or other forms of forced induction. Several owners of high performance model cars have adopted its use due to its high heat tolerance and its resistance to shearing. Rotella T6 is a Non Energy Conserving Oil, and does not meet GF-5 Oil specifications. When Rotella T6 was revised for the API specification (for use in spark ignition engines), its zinc levels were effectively reduced. Higher (content) zinc additives (ZDDP) are required for flat tappet engines and cartridge bearings, which in previous formulations Rotella T6 had desirable levels of zinc (ZDDP).

== CK-4 Update ==
In December 2016 Shell Rotella Oils were updated to the newer API CK-4 Oil specification (Previously CJ-4).

″The new API CK-4 and FA-4 categories are driven by changes in engine technology to meet emissions, renewable fuel and fuel economy standards for reduced CO_{2} and other greenhouse gas emissions″

== CK-4 Update Controversy ==
Upon Release of CK-4 API Licensing (Dec/2016) FORD issued a statement stating ″Ford testing has shown some CK-4 type formulations have shown inadequate wear protection compared to CJ-4 formulations developed and licensed before 2016″ Similarly, Stellantis also issued a TSB citing Oil requirements that eliminated CK-4 Rotella from being an approved option in the 6.7L Diesel engines..And RAM's 3rd Gen ECO-Diesel equipped trucks no longer recommend CK-4 in their Diesel engines.

Rotella has since gained Fords updated oil specification by raising the phosphorus level of Rotella products. Rotella does not meet Stellantis' new oil specification as of Jan/2024.

With Rotella's CK-4 offerings under a new light, their robustness for use in Gasoline engines has come into question. Many users that once relied on Rotella in their gasoline engines have moved onto Motor oils that meet more stringent Gasoline Motor oil tests such as Porsche A40, BMW LL01, and MB229.5. Another Shell product that meets these specifications would be Pennzoil Platinum® Euro.
