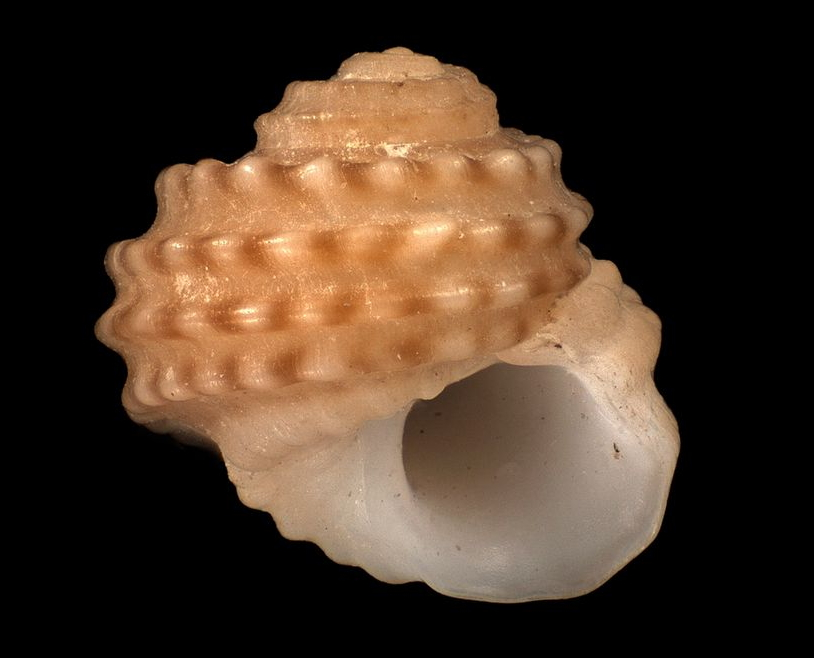
- Shell of Collonista imperforata (specimen at the Museum of New Zealand)

Scientific classification
- Kingdom: Animalia
- Phylum: Mollusca
- Class: Gastropoda
- Subclass: Vetigastropoda
- Order: Trochida
- Superfamily: Trochoidea
- Family: Colloniidae
- Subfamily: Colloniinae
- Genus: Collonista
- Species: C. imperforata

Binomial name
- Collonista imperforata (Suter, 1908)

Synonyms
- Argalista imperforata (Suter, 1908) · superseded combination; Complicatacollonista imperforata (Suter, 1908) superseded combination; Homalopoma (Argalista) foveauxana Ponder, 1968 (junior subjective synonym); Pseudoliotia imperforata Suter, 1908 superseded combination

= Collonista imperforata =

Species of gastropod

Collonista imperforata is a species of small sea snail with calcareous opercula, a marine gastropod mollusk in the family Colloniidae.

== Description ==
The diameter of the shell attains 3.5mm, its height 3.05mm.

(Original description) The shell is small, globose, imperforate when adult, and thick. It features a spirally costate (ribbed) sculpture. The color is yellowish-white, with the spiral ribs maculated with brown. The spire is depressed, sitting lower than the aperture.

The sculpture consists of prominent, nodulous ribs, with the nodules being rather low. There are two ribs on the penultimate whorl and six on the body whorl. A small nodulous rib appears on the last half of the body whorl close to the suture, followed by four equally strong, equidistant spiral ribs. The interspaces are much broader than the ribs. The whole surface is crossed by fine, close, oblique incremental striae. A sixth broad rib, more nodulous than the others, forms a semicircle around the strongly impressed umbilical area. This area is itself ornamented with distant axial folds.

The protoconch (initial shell) is white, consisting of two spirally costate flat whorls. There are four whorls total, with the last being large, flattened below the suture, and then convex; the base is rounded. The suture is not impressed.

The aperture is oblique, nearly circular, white, and porcellanous inside. The peristome (lip) is thick, very little contracted, crenulated on the outside by the spiral ribs, and regularly convex. The columella is arcuate, shining, white, and thick. The inner lip spreads over the umbilicus, completely sealing it up, or sometimes leaving a minute chink (a small opening). A white callus unites the converging margins of the peristome. In young specimens, the umbilicus is open, but very narrow. The operculum was not seen.

== Distribution ==
This marine species is endemic to New Zealand, occurring off South Island and Stewart Island.
