= Cantrainea philipiana =

Scientific classification
- Kingdom: Animalia
- Phylum: Mollusca
- Class: Gastropoda
- Subclass: Vetigastropoda
- Order: Trochida
- Family: Colloniidae
- Genus: Cantrainea
- Species: C. philipiana

Binomial name
- Cantrainea philipiana (Dall, 1889)

Species of gastropod

Cantrainea philipiana is a species of small sea snail with calcareous opercula, a marine gastropod mollusk in the family Colloniidae.

== Distribution ==
This marine species occurs in the Lesser Antilles off Dominica.
