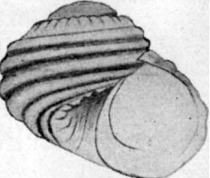
- Drawing of a shell of Leptothyra candida

Scientific classification
- Kingdom: Animalia
- Phylum: Mollusca
- Class: Gastropoda
- Subclass: Vetigastropoda
- Order: Trochida
- Family: Colloniidae
- Genus: Leptothyra
- Species: L. candida

Binomial name
- Leptothyra candida Pease, 1861

Synonyms
- Collonia candida Pease, 1861; Collonista candida (Pease, 1861)

= Leptothyra candida =

Species of gastropod

Leptothyra candida is a species of sea snail, a marine gastropod mollusk in the family Colloniidae.

== Distribution ==
This marine species occurs off Hawaii and the Seychelles and Aldabra Atoll.
