= Homalopoma linnei =

Scientific classification
- Kingdom: Animalia
- Phylum: Mollusca
- Class: Gastropoda
- Subclass: Vetigastropoda
- Order: Trochida
- Family: Colloniidae
- Genus: Homalopoma
- Species: H. linnei

Binomial name
- Homalopoma linnei (Dall, 1889)

Synonyms
- Leptothyra limata Dall, 1889; Leptothyra linnei Dall, 1889

Species of gastropod

Homalopoma linnei is a species of sea snail, a marine gastropod mollusc in the family Colloniidae.

== Description ==
The length of the shell attains 6 mm. It is a species that belong to the Homalopoma genus. Its original name is Leptothyra linnei Dall, 1889.

== Distribution ==
This species occurs at depths between 80 m and 1472 m in the Gulf of Mexico off Florida and in the Caribbean Sea off Cuba; off St. Lucia, Barbados; in the Atlantic Ocean off Brazil.
