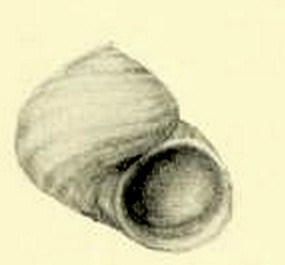
- Original image of a shell of Charisma arenacea

Scientific classification
- Kingdom: Animalia
- Phylum: Mollusca
- Class: Gastropoda
- Subclass: Vetigastropoda
- Order: Trochida
- Superfamily: Trochoidea
- Family: Trochidae
- Genus: Charisma
- Species: C. arenacea

Binomial name
- Charisma arenacea (Pritchard & Gatliff, 1902)

Synonyms
- Leptothyra arenacea Pritchard & Gatliff, 1902

= Charisma arenacea =

Species of gastropod

Charisma arenacea, common name the sandy charisma, is a species of extremely small sea snail, a marine gastropod mollusk in the family Trochidae, the top snails.

== Description ==
The height of the shell attains 2 mm, its diameter also 2 mm. The small, solid, umbilicate shell has a turbinate shape. Its color is sordid white. The four to five whorls are convex. The nuclear whorls are smooth, the rest are spirally ridged. These ridges are well-developed and number about 11 to 13 around the circular aperture on the body whorl. The space between the ridges is wider than the ridges. The umbilicus is deep and extends at the back of the columella to the anterior of the aperture. It is occasionally margined by a strong thread. The base of the shell is round. The lip is thick.

== Distribution ==
This marine species is endemic to Australia and occurs off South Australia, Victoria and Tasmania.
