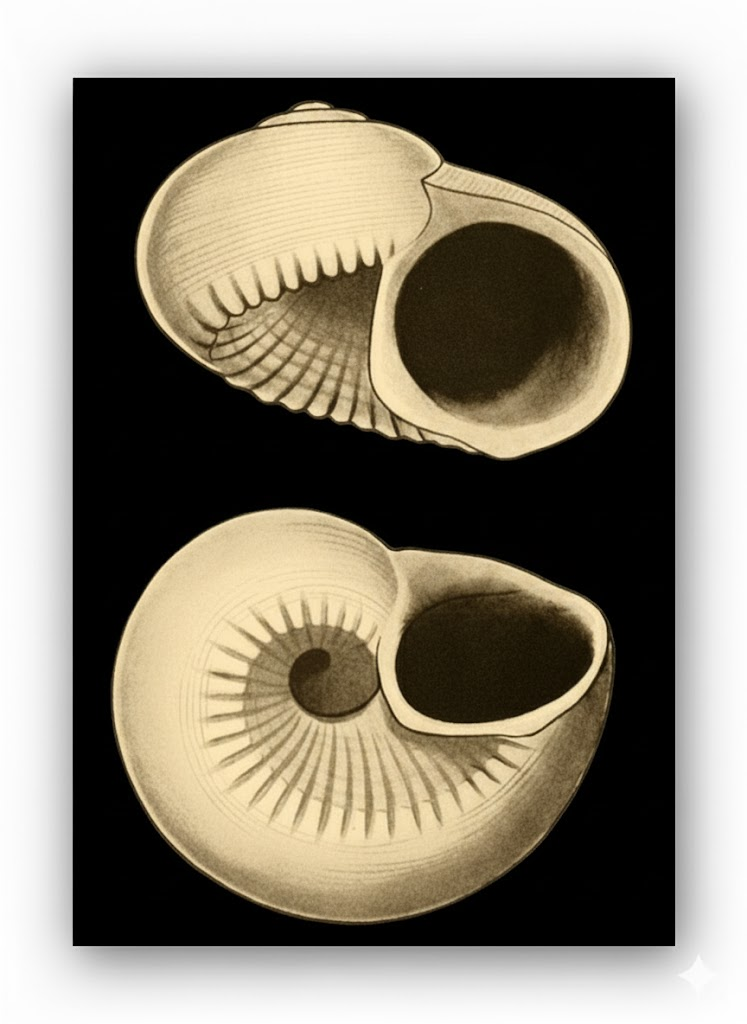
- Shell of Argalista rotella (holotype)

Scientific classification
- Kingdom: Animalia
- Phylum: Mollusca
- Class: Gastropoda
- Subclass: Vetigastropoda
- Order: Trochida
- Superfamily: Trochoidea
- Family: Colloniidae
- Subfamily: Colloniinae
- Genus: Argalista
- Species: A. rotella

Binomial name
- Argalista rotella Powell, 1937

= Argalista rotella =

Species of gastropod

Argalista rotella is a species of small sea snail with calcareous opercula, a marine gastropod mollusk in the family Colloniidae.

== Description ==
The height of the shell attains 1.1 mm, its diameter 1.6 mm.

(Original description) The small, white shell is moderately solid. It is depressed and widely umbilicate. It contains 3¼ whorls including a smooth low convex protoconch of 1½ whorls. The sculpture of the post-nuclear whorls consists of numerous closely spaced, faint, rounded spiral threads, and strong radial folds surrounding the umbilicus. The spiral threads number about forty on the body whorl, and they are slightly more distinct on the upper part. There are thirty axial folds in the holotype and they are strongest where they cross a faintly angular spiral ridge which in turn defines a wide depressed concavity running into the umbilicus. These folds fade out at about half way towards the periphery and also at the umbilicus proper, which is further defined by another angular spiral ridge. Width of umbilicus proper about one-sixth major diameter of base; umbilical concavity almost two-thirds major diameter of base. The aperture is circular. The peristome is thin, overhangs above and is connected across the parietal wall by a callous pad. The spire measures about one-third the height of the aperture.

== Distribution ==
This marine species is endemic to New Zealand and occurs off Three Kings Islands.
