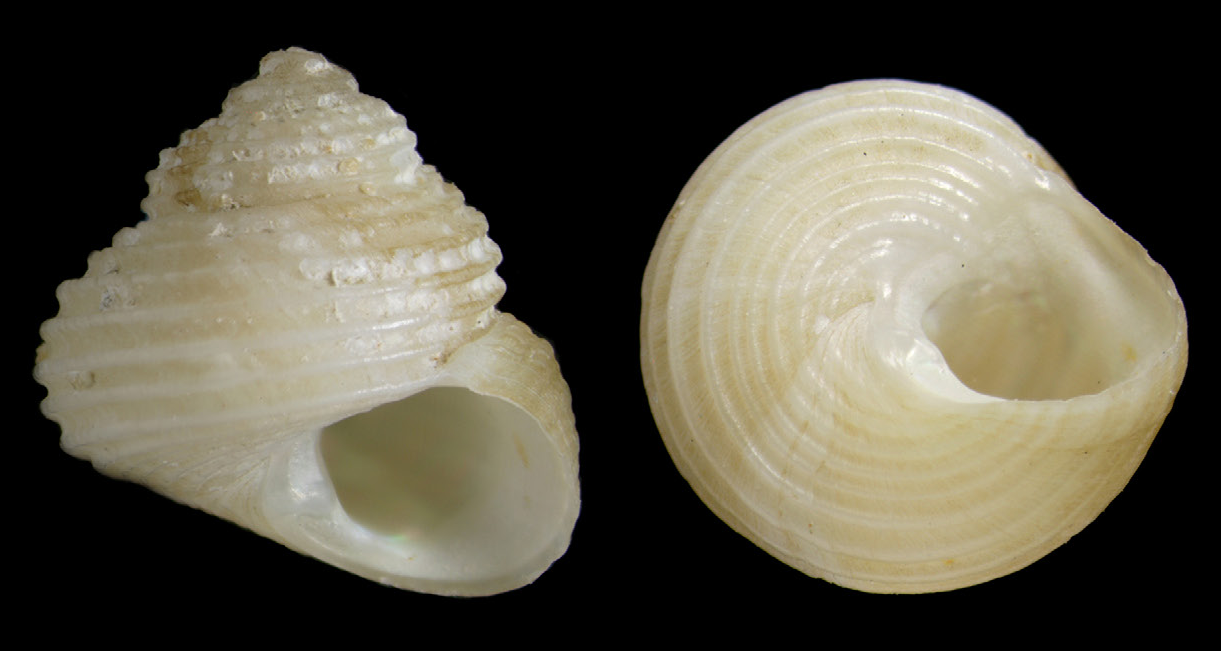

Scientific classification
- Kingdom: Animalia
- Phylum: Mollusca
- Class: Gastropoda
- Subclass: Vetigastropoda
- Order: Trochida
- Family: Colloniidae
- Genus: Cantrainea
- Species: C. globuloides

Binomial name
- Cantrainea globuloides (Dautzenberg & H. Fischer, 1896)

Synonyms
- Leptothyra globuloides Dautzenberg & H. Fischer, 1896

= Cantrainea globuloides =

Species of gastropod

Cantrainea globuloides is a species of sea snail, a marine gastropod mollusk in the family Colloniidae.

== Distribution ==
This marine species occurs on the Galicia Bank (Northeast Atlantic Ocean)
