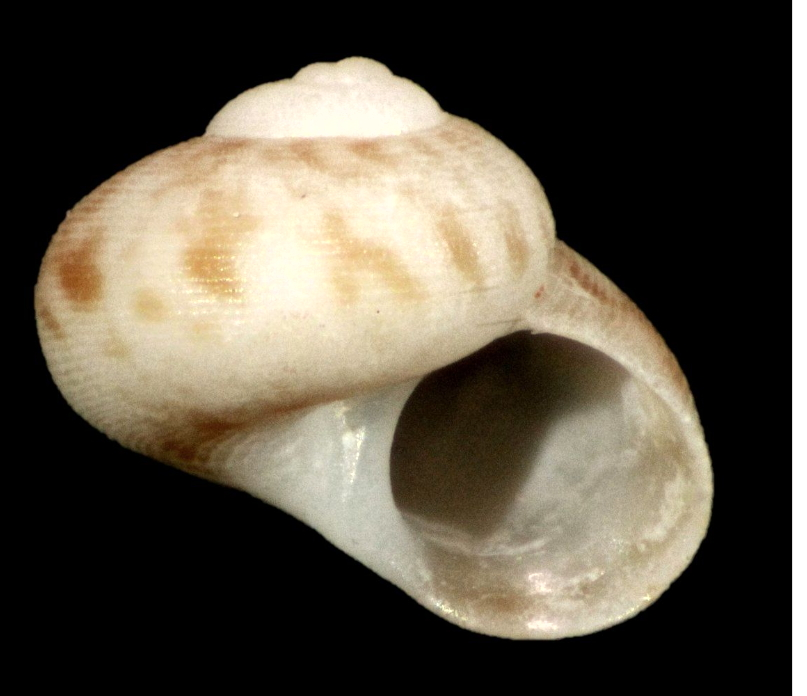
- Shell of Argalista fluctuata (specimen at Naturalis Biodiversity Center)

Scientific classification
- Kingdom: Animalia
- Phylum: Mollusca
- Class: Gastropoda
- Subclass: Vetigastropoda
- Order: Trochida
- Superfamily: Trochoidea
- Family: Colloniidae
- Subfamily: Colloniinae
- Genus: Argalista
- Species: A. fluctuata

Binomial name
- Argalista fluctuata (Hutton, 1883)

Synonyms
- Cyclostrema fluctuata Hutton, 1883; Cyclostrema fluctuatum F. W. Hutton, 1883 (superseded combination with corrected gender ending); Homalopoma (Argalista) fluctuata (Hutton, 1883); Leptothyra fluctuata Suter, 1913; Homalopoma (Argalista) fluctuata Powell, 1979

= Argalista fluctuata =

Species of gastropod

Argalista fluctuata is a species of small sea snail with calcareous opercula, a marine gastropod mollusk in the family Colloniidae.

== Description ==
The small, rather solid shell is spirally striated. It is not iridescent. Its colour is yellowish white or pale brownish with irregular waved longitudinal bands of brown, which are rather indistinct. The spire is depressed and obtuse. The shell contains four whorls. They are rounded and distinctly and closely spirally grooved. The umbilical region is smooth. The suture is scarcely impressed. The narrow umbilicus is deep. The aperture is subrotund. The peristome is acute and not continuous. The lower lip is thickened. The rather thick, white operculum is subcalcareous. It is round and translucent. It contains about six slowly increasing whorls.

== Distribution ==
This marine species is endemic to New Zealand and occurs off Southern South Island and Stewart Island, Snares Islands, Antipodes Islands, Bounty Islands and Chatham Island.
