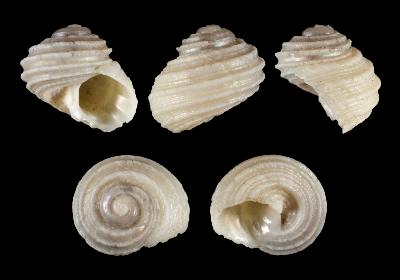
- Shells of Homalopoma alfi (holotype in MNHN, Paris)

Scientific classification
- Kingdom: Animalia
- Phylum: Mollusca
- Class: Gastropoda
- Subclass: Vetigastropoda
- Order: Trochida
- Superfamily: Trochoidea
- Family: Colloniidae
- Subfamily: Colloniinae
- Genus: Homalopoma; Carpenter, 1864

Type species
- Turbo sanguineus Linnaeus, 1758

Synonyms
- † Homalopoma (Boutillieria) Cossmann, 1888 accepted, alternate representation; Homalopoma (Homalopoma) Carpenter, 1864· accepted, alternate representation; Leptonyx Carpenter, 1864 (junior homonym of Leptonyx Swainson, 1833 [Aves]; Homalopoma is a replacement name); Leptothyra J. G. Cooper, 1867 (junior objective synonym of Homalopoma)

= Homalopoma =

Genus of gastropods

Homalopoma, common name the dwarf turbans, is a genus of mostly very small sea snails with a calcareous operculum, marine gastropoda molluscs in the subfamily Colloniinae of the family Colloniidae.

== Species ==
Species within the genus Homalopoma include:

- † Homalopoma abeshinaiense Kaim, R. G. Jenkins & Hikida, 2009
- † Homalopoma acaste Thivaiou, Harzhauser & Koskeridou, 2019
- Homalopoma africanum (Bartsch, 1915)
- Homalopoma agulhasense (Thiele, 1925)
- Homalopoma albidum (Dall, 1881)
- Homalopoma alfi Huang, Fu & Poppe, 2016
- Homalopoma amussitatum (Gould, 1861)
- Homalopoma baculum (Carpenter, 1864)
- Homalopoma berryi J. H. McLean, 1964
- Homalopoma bicolor Okutani, 2001
- Homalopoma boffii Marini, 1975
- Homalopoma carmelae Oliverio & Buzzurro, 1994
- Homalopoma clippertonense (Hertlein & Emerson, 1953)
- Homalopoma cordellensis J. H. McLean, 1996
- Homalopoma cunninghami (E. A. Smith, 1881)
- Homalopoma donghaiense (Dong, 1982)
- Homalopoma draperi J. H. McLean, 1984
- † Homalopoma emulum (G. Seguenza, 1876)
- † Homalopoma eugenii (Deshayes, 1863)
- Homalopoma granuliferum Nomura & Hatai, 1940
- † Homalopoma granulosum (Grateloup, 1828)
- Homalopoma grippii (Dall, 1911)
- Homalopoma himuquitanense Huang, Fu & Poppe, 2016
- Homalopoma hui Huang, Fu & Poppe, 2016
- Homalopoma imberculi Huang, Fu & Poppe, 2016
- Homalopoma incarnatum (Pilsbry, 1903)
- Homalopoma indutum (Watson, 1879)
- Homalopoma keyurare Huang, Fu & Poppe, 2016
- Homalopoma lacunatum (Carpenter, 1864)
- Homalopoma laevigatum (G. B. Sowerby III, 1914)
- Homalopoma lini Huang, Fu & Poppe, 2016
- Homalopoma linnei (Dall, 1889)
- Homalopoma lunellum Huang, Fu & Poppe, 2016
- Homalopoma luridum (Dall, 1885)
- Homalopoma mactanense Huang, Fu & Poppe, 2016
- Homalopoma maculatum Golikov & Gulbin, 1978
- Homalopoma maculosa (Pease, 1868)
- Homalopoma mikkelsenae Huang, Fu & Poppe, 2016
- Homalopoma mimicum LaFollette, 1976
- Homalopoma nocturnum (Gould, 1861)
- Homalopoma nubisrubri Huang, Fu & Poppe, 2016
- Homalopoma parvum Huang, Fu & Poppe, 2016
- Homalopoma paucicostatum (Dall, 1871)
- Homalopoma profundum Huang, Fu & Poppe, 2016
- Homalopoma quantillum Gould, 1861
- Homalopoma radiatum (Dall, 1918)
- † Homalopoma raulini (Cossmann & Peyrot, 1917)
- Homalopoma rotundatum Sowerby, 1889
- Homalopoma rubidum (Dall, 1908)
- Homalopoma sangarense (Schrenck, 1862)
- Homalopoma sanguineum (Linnaeus, 1758)
- Homalopoma shisuiense (Makiyama, 1927)
- Homalopoma subobsoletum Willett, 1937
- Homalopoma tagaroae Huang, Fu & Poppe, 2016
- Homalopoma tapparonei (Caramagna, 1888)
- Homalopoma umbilicatum (Powell, 1926)
- Homalopoma unicum Huang, Fu & Poppe, 2016
- Homalopoma zephyrium Huang, Fu & Poppe, 2016

Species brought into synonymy

- Homalopoma albobrunneum Bozzetti, 2014: synonym of Yaronia albobrunnea (Bozzetti, 2014) (original combination)
- Homalopoma arsinoense (Issel, 1869): synonym of Collonista arsinoensis (Issel, 1869)
- Homalopoma carpenteri Pilsbry, 1888: synonym of Homalopoma luridum (Dall, 1885)
- Homalopoma concepcionensis H. N. Lowe, 1935: synonym of Haplocochlias concepcionensis (H. N. Lowe, 1933) (original combination)
- Homalopoma concors Huang, Fu & Poppe, 2016: synonym of Gloriacollonia concors (Huang, Fu & Poppe, 2016)
- Homalopoma decolorum Tiba, 1983: synonym of Homalopoma eoa Azuma, 1972
- Homalopoma engbergi (Willett, 1929): synonym of Homalopoma lacunatum (Carpenter, 1864)
- Homalopoma eoa Azuma, 1972: synonym of Gloriacollonia eoa (M. Azuma, 1972)
- Homalopoma finkli Petuch, 1987 accepted as Cataegis finkli (Petuch, 1987)
- Homalopoma globuloides (Dautzenberg & Fischer, 1896): synonym of Cantrainea globuloides (Dautzenberg & H. Fischer, 1896)
- Homalopoma juanensis (Dall, 1919) : synonym of Homalopoma luridum (Dall, 1885)
- Homalopoma kussakini Egorov, 2000 : synonym of Lirularia iridescens (Schrenck, 1863)
- Homalopoma nocturnus [sic] : synonym of Homalopoma nocturnum (Gould, 1861) (incorrect gender ending)
- Homalopoma panamense (Dall, 1908): synonym of Cantrainea panamensis (Dall, 1908)
- Homalopoma pustulatum (Brocchi, 1821): synonym of Turbo pustulatus Brocchi, 1821
- Homalopoma rotundata [sic]: synonym of Homalopoma rotundatum (Sowerby, 1889)
- Homalopoma tosaense Habe, 1953: synonym of Cantrainea tosaensis (Habe, 1953) (original combination)

Other species include:

- Homalopoma crassicostata (Murdoch, 1905)
- Homalopoma fluctuata (Hutton, 1883)
- Homalopoma imperforata (Suter, 1908)
- Homalopoma micans (Powell, 1931)
- Homalopoma nana (Finlay, 1930)
- Homalopoma peloritanum (Cantraine, 1835)
- Homalopoma philipiana (Dall, 1889)
- Homalopoma rotella (Powell, 1937)
- Homalopoma variecostata (Powell, 1937)
