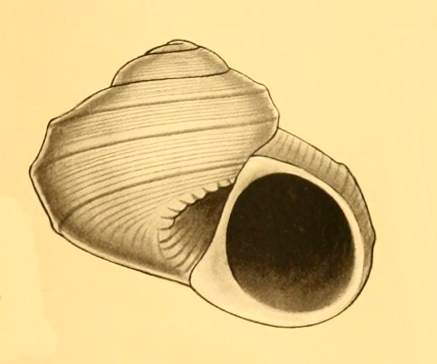
- Shell of Orbiscollonia variecostata (holotype)

Scientific classification
- Kingdom: Animalia
- Phylum: Mollusca
- Class: Gastropoda
- Subclass: Vetigastropoda
- Order: Trochida
- Superfamily: Trochoidea
- Family: Colloniidae
- Genus: Orbiscollonia
- Species: O. variecostata

Binomial name
- Orbiscollonia variecostata (Powell, 1937)

Synonyms
- Argalista variecostata A. W. B. Powell, 1937 superseded combination

= Orbiscollonia variecostata =

Species of gastropod

Orbiscollonia variecostata is a species of small sea snail with calcareous opercula, a marine gastropod mollusk in the family Colloniidae.

== Description ==
The height of the shell attains 1.8 mm, its diameter 2.3 mm.

(Original description) The small, soli shell is turbinate and umbilicat. It is sculptured with numerous closely spaced spiral cords, and three spiral keels. The shell contains 3½ whorls, includinga minute smooth slightly convex protoconch of one whorl. The spire measures about two-thirds the height of the aperture. The umbilicus is open, deep, about one-sixth the diameter of base. Its edge is fairly sharp and is crenulated by short axial folds. Only two of the spiral keels show on the spire whorls, the third being just below the suture; they are equispaced, rather widely over the middle of the body whorl. The finer spiral cords on the body whorl number nine between the suture and the uppermost keel, followed by eight both between keels 1 and 2 and keels 2 and 3, and finally ten from the lowest keel to the umbilicus. The rounded aperture is typical. The colour of the holotype is pale pink with very small irregular patches of light brown. The peristome and the interior of the apertureare white. Some paratypes have the ground colour buff.

== Distribution ==
This marine species is endemic to New Zealand off Three Kings Island.
