= Leptocollonia thielei =

Scientific classification
- Kingdom: Animalia
- Phylum: Mollusca
- Class: Gastropoda
- Subclass: Vetigastropoda
- Order: Trochida
- Superfamily: Trochoidea
- Family: Colloniidae
- Subfamily: Colloniinae
- Genus: Leptocollonia
- Species: L. thielei

Binomial name
- Leptocollonia thielei A. W. B. Powell, 1951

Species of gastropod

Leptocollonia thielei is a species of small sea snail with calcareous opercula, a marine gastropod mollusk in the family Colloniidae.

== Description ==
The colorless shell grows to a height of 7 mm. It has a thin shell. It has a depressed-turbinate shape.

== Distribution ==
This marine species occurs off the South Georgia Islands and the Antarctic Peninsula.
