= Homalopoma carmelae =

Scientific classification
- Kingdom: Animalia
- Phylum: Mollusca
- Class: Gastropoda
- Subclass: Vetigastropoda
- Order: Trochida
- Family: Colloniidae
- Genus: Homalopoma
- Species: H. carmelae

Binomial name
- Homalopoma carmelae Oliverio & Buzzurro, 1994

Species of gastropod

Homalopoma carmelae is a species of sea snail, a marine gastropod mollusc in the family Colloniidae.

== Distribution ==
This species occurs in the Mediterranean Sea off Cyprus.
