= Homalopoma baculum =

Scientific classification
- Kingdom: Animalia
- Phylum: Mollusca
- Class: Gastropoda
- Subclass: Vetigastropoda
- Order: Trochida
- Superfamily: Trochoidea
- Family: Colloniidae
- Subfamily: Colloniinae
- Genus: Homalopoma
- Species: H. baculum

Binomial name
- Homalopoma baculum (Carpenter, 1864)

Synonyms
- Collonia paucicostata Sowb. (not Dall); Leptothyra bacula Carpenter, 1864 (original combination)

Species of gastropod

Homalopoma baculum, common name the berry dwarf turban, is a species of small sea snail with calcareous opercula, a marine gastropod mollusk in the family Colloniidae.

== Description ==
The height of the shell varies between 3.5 mm and 8 mm. The small, rufous ashy shell has a depressed-globose shape. It is solid and imperforate. It contains four slightly convex whorls that are rapidly increasing. The sculpture is obsoletely but regularly spirally striate. The large aperture is oblique and deflexed above.

== Distribution ==
This common marine species occurs between tides and under rocks in the Salish Sea, Northwest America to Baja California, Mexico.
