= Homalopoma paucicostatum =

Few-ribbed dwarf turban
- Drawing of a shell of Homalopoma paucicostatum

Scientific classification
- Kingdom: Animalia
- Phylum: Mollusca
- Class: Gastropoda
- Subclass: Vetigastropoda
- Order: Trochida
- Superfamily: Trochoidea
- Family: Colloniidae
- Subfamily: Colloniinae
- Genus: Homalopoma
- Species: H. paucicostatum

Binomial name
- Homalopoma paucicostatum (Dall, 1871)

Synonyms
- Leptothyra paucicostata Dall, 1871 (original combination)

Species of gastropod

Homalopoma paucicostatum, common name the few-ribbed dwarf turban, is a species of small sea snail with calcareous opercula, a marine gastropod mollusk in the family Colloniidae.

== Described ==
As attested by the epithet, the small, depressed-globose shell of this species has few, prominent spiral ribs. The shell grows to a height of 4 mm. The shell is solid and imperforate. The four whorls rapidly increase and are very strongly spirally lirate. There are seven to eight lirae on the body whorl, separated by deep grooves, in which incremental strife are evident. The sutures are canaliculate. The aperture is contracted and pearly white within. The columella ends in a callous tubercle. The color of the shell is rusty brown or rose-red, frequently with alternating white spots on the ribs. The interstices are generally lighter, sometimes pure white.

== Distribution ==
This is a fairly common species living at low tide in sand, under rocks and on broken shells in the Pacific Ocean off California.
