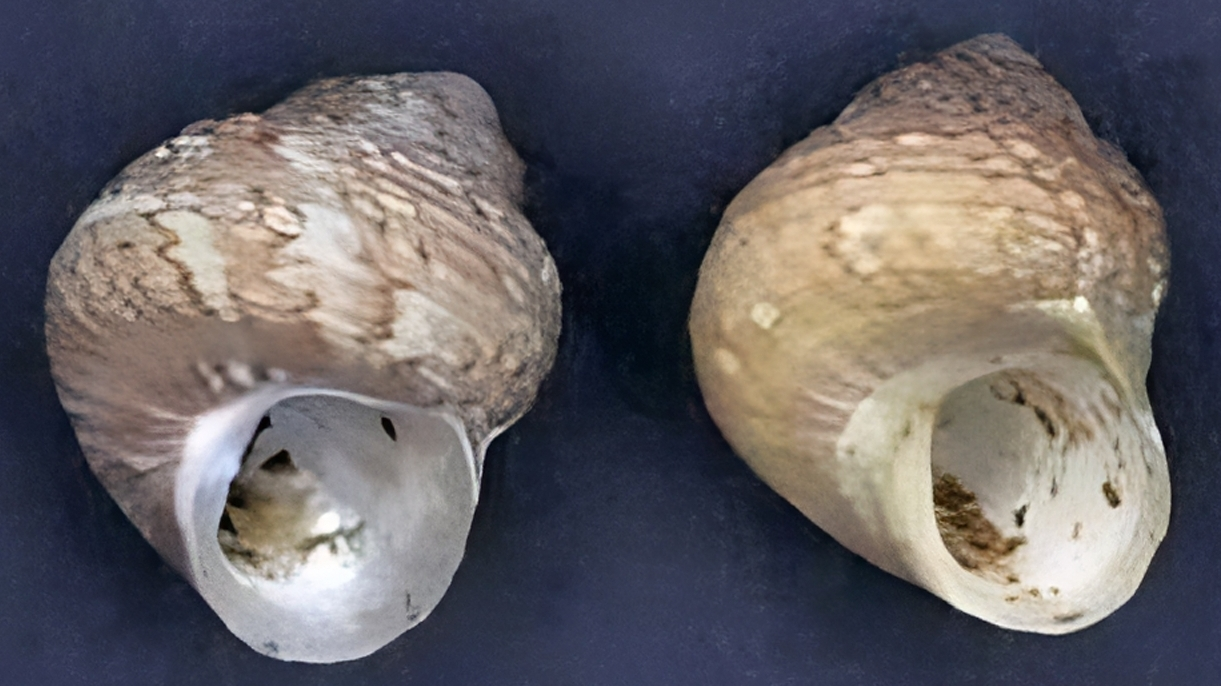

Scientific classification
- Kingdom: Animalia
- Phylum: Mollusca
- Class: Gastropoda
- Subclass: Vetigastropoda
- Order: Trochida
- Family: Colloniidae
- Genus: Homalopoma
- Species: H. sangarense

Binomial name
- Homalopoma sangarense (Schrenck, 1862)

Synonyms
- Leptothyra sangarensis Schrenck, 1862; Turbo corallinus Reeve; Turbo sangarensis Schrenck, 1867

= Homalopoma sangarense =

Species of gastropod

Homalopoma sangarense is a species of sea snail, a marine gastropod mollusc in the family Colloniidae.

== Description ==
The height of the shell varies between 7 mm and 10 mm. The median teeth of the radula are oval, wide, with a narrow projection above, and more or less narrowed toward the base. The upper margin is in no case reflected, so that cusp, cutting point or edge, in any usual sense, there is none.

== Distribution ==
This marine species occurs off Vietnam, Korea, North Japan and Sakhalin
