= Homalopoma mimicum =

Scientific classification
- Kingdom: Animalia
- Phylum: Mollusca
- Class: Gastropoda
- Subclass: Vetigastropoda
- Order: Trochida
- Superfamily: Trochoidea
- Family: Colloniidae
- Subfamily: Colloniinae
- Genus: Homalopoma
- Species: H. mimicum

Binomial name
- Homalopoma mimicum LaFollette, 1976

Species of gastropod

Homalopoma mimicum is a species of small sea snail with calcareous opercula, a marine gastropod mollusk in the family Colloniidae.

== Distribution ==
This species occurs in the Pacific Ocean off Baja California, Mexico.
