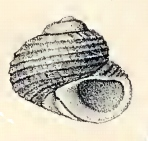
- Drawing of a shell of Homalopoma nocturnum

Scientific classification
- Kingdom: Animalia
- Phylum: Mollusca
- Class: Gastropoda
- Subclass: Vetigastropoda
- Order: Trochida
- Family: Colloniidae
- Genus: Homalopoma
- Species: H. nocturnum

Binomial name
- Homalopoma nocturnum (Gould, 1861)

Synonyms
- Collonia rubra Dunker, 1882; Leptothyra rubra laevicostata Pilsbry, 1901

= Homalopoma nocturnum =

Species of gastropod

Homalopoma nocturnum is a species of sea snail, a marine gastropod mollusc in the family Colloniidae.

== Description ==
The size of the shell varies between 4 mm and 7 mm. The small, solid shell has a globose shape. It has 4-4½ rotund whorls, marked with subgranulose transverse ribs. The suture is obvious. The rotund aperture is iridescent and pearly within. The lip is thickened.

== Distribution ==
This marine species occurs off Southern Japan.
