= Rhombipoma rowleyana =

Scientific classification
- Kingdom: Animalia
- Phylum: Mollusca
- Class: Gastropoda
- Subclass: Vetigastropoda
- Order: Trochida
- Superfamily: Trochoidea
- Family: Colloniidae
- Subfamily: Liotipomatinae
- Genus: Rhombipoma
- Species: R. rowleyana

Binomial name
- Rhombipoma rowleyana McLean, 2012

Species of gastropod

Rhombipoma rowleyana is a species of small sea snail with calcareous opercula, a marine gastropod mollusc in the family Colloniidae.

== Description ==
The height of the shell reaches 3.2 mm.

== Distribution ==
This marine species occurs off the Mermaid Shoals, Western Australia.
