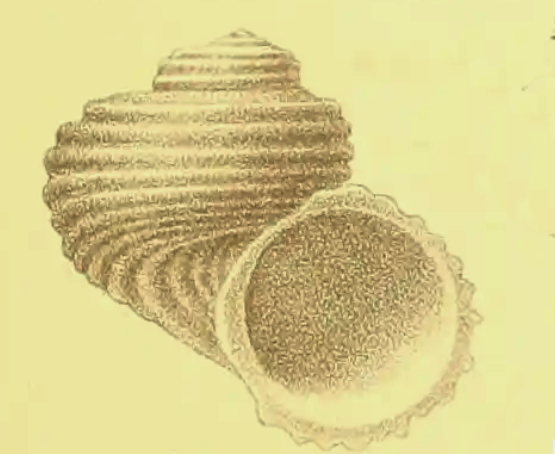
- Shell of Leptocollonia innocens (holotype)

Scientific classification
- Kingdom: Animalia
- Phylum: Mollusca
- Class: Gastropoda
- Subclass: Vetigastropoda
- Order: Trochida
- Family: Colloniidae
- Genus: Leptocollonia
- Species: L. innocens

Binomial name
- Leptocollonia innocens (Thiele, 1912)

Synonyms
- Leptothyra innocens Thiele, 1912 · unaccepted (original combination)

= Leptocollonia innocens =

Species of gastropod

Leptocollonia innocens is a species of sea snail, a marine gastropod mollusk in the family Colloniidae.

== Description ==
The shell grows to a length of 5 mm, its diameter 5 mm.

(Original description in German) The shell consists of 3 1/2 whorls. These begin with a rounded, smooth, and slightly protruding apex, which is followed by about 1/2 more smooth whorls. The subsequent whorls are sculptured with rounded, fairly strong spiral ribs. These ribs gradually increase in number as additional ones emerge within the deep furrows, eventually bringing the total count to about 20, the last of which are located inside the deep, moderately wide umbilicus. The whorls themselves are rounded, rapidly increasing in size, and descending, while the spire is distinctly blunt at the top. The surface of the shell displays distinct, dense, and slightly wrinkled growth lines. The aperture is rounded; its outer margin reflects the ends of the ribs, and the columellar margin is somewhat widened and reflected in the middle. The entire margin shows a clear demarcation where the outer translucent layer meets the inner nacreous (mother-of-pearl) layer. Two isolated opercula, which are likewise concave on the outside toward the center because the whorls are offset from one another in a step-like fashion, prove one of two things: either the described species of Leptothyra grows even larger—as the largest operculum measures 2.9 by 2.6 mm in diameter—or a second, larger species occurs alongside it. I consider the former scenario to be more likely, as the shape of the operculum does not argue against it.

== Distribution ==
This species occurs in the Weddell Sea, Antarctica in benthic zones.
