= Liotipoma solaris =

Scientific classification
- Kingdom: Animalia
- Phylum: Mollusca
- Class: Gastropoda
- Subclass: Vetigastropoda
- Order: Trochida
- Superfamily: Trochoidea
- Family: Colloniidae
- Subfamily: Liotipomatinae
- Genus: Liotipoma
- Species: L. solaris

Binomial name
- Liotipoma solaris McLean, 2012

Species of gastropod

Liotipoma solaris is a species of small sea snail with calcareous opercula, a marine gastropod mollusc in the family Colloniidae.

== Description ==
The shell grows to a height of 4 mm and a diameter of 1 mm. It is known from male shells with a fully formed tongue. It has minimal whorl expansion and a very short, triangular tongue with a pointed tip.

== Distribution ==
This marine species occurs off the Fiji Islands and Papua New Guinea, in the Indo-Pacific coral reefs.
