= Paraliotipoma sirenkoi =

Scientific classification
- Kingdom: Animalia
- Phylum: Mollusca
- Class: Gastropoda
- Subclass: Vetigastropoda
- Order: Trochida
- Superfamily: Trochoidea
- Family: Colloniidae
- Subfamily: Liotipomatinae
- Genus: Paraliotipoma
- Species: P. sirenkoi

Binomial name
- Paraliotipoma sirenkoi McLean, 2012

Species of gastropod

Paraliotipoma sirenkoi is a species of small sea snail with calcareous opercula, a marine gastropod mollusk in the family Colloniidae.

== Description ==
The shell reaches a height of 4.2 mm.

== Distribution ==
This marine species occurs off the Chiametan Bank, South China Sea.
