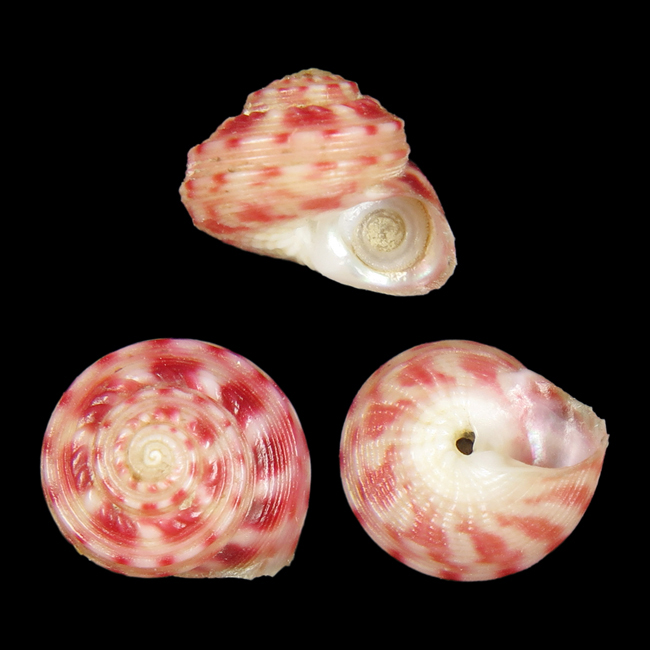

Scientific classification
- Kingdom: Animalia
- Phylum: Mollusca
- Class: Gastropoda
- Subclass: Vetigastropoda
- Order: Trochida
- Family: Colloniidae
- Genus: Homalopoma
- Species: H. zephyrium

Binomial name
- Homalopoma zephyrium Huang, Fu & Poppe, 2016

= Homalopoma zephyrium =

Species of gastropod

Homalopoma zephyrium is a species of sea snail, a marine gastropod mollusk in the family Colloniidae.

== Distribution ==
This marine species occurs off the Philippines.

== Original description ==
- Huang S.-I, Fu I-F. & Poppe G.T. (2016). Taiwanese and Philippine Colloniidae. Nomenclatural remarks and the description of 17 new species (Gastropoda: Colloniidae). Visaya. 4(5): 4-42. page(s): 26.
