= Homalopoma imperforata =

Scientific classification
- Kingdom: Animalia
- Phylum: Mollusca
- Class: Gastropoda
- Subclass: Vetigastropoda
- Order: Trochida
- Family: Colloniidae
- Genus: Homalopoma
- Species: H. imperforata

Binomial name
- Homalopoma imperforata (Suter, 1908)

Synonyms
- Pseudoliotia imperforata Suter, 1908; Homalopoma foveauxana Ponder, 1968

Species of gastropod

Homalopoma imperforata is a species of small sea snail with a calcareous operculum, a marine gastropod mollusc in the family Colloniidae.

== Distribution ==
This species occurs in New Zealand.
