= Homalopoma rotundatum =

Scientific classification
- Kingdom: Animalia
- Phylum: Mollusca
- Class: Gastropoda
- Subclass: Vetigastropoda
- Order: Trochida
- Family: Colloniidae
- Genus: Homalopoma
- Species: H. rotundatum

Binomial name
- Homalopoma rotundatum (Sowerby, 1889)

Synonyms
- Cyclostrema rotundata G.B. Sowerby III, 1892 (original combination); Homalopoma rotundata [sic] (incorrect gender ending); Leptothyra rotundata (G.B. Sowerby III, 1892)

Species of gastropod

Homalopoma rotundatum is a species of sea snail, a marine gastropod mollusc in the family Colloniidae.

== Description ==
The size of the shell varies between 2 mm and 3.6 mm.

== Distribution ==
This marine species is found off the Cape Province, South Africa.
