= Liotipoma clausa =

Scientific classification
- Kingdom: Animalia
- Phylum: Mollusca
- Class: Gastropoda
- Subclass: Vetigastropoda
- Order: Trochida
- Superfamily: Trochoidea
- Family: Colloniidae
- Subfamily: Liotipomatinae
- Genus: Liotipoma
- Species: L. clausa

Binomial name
- Liotipoma clausa McLean, 2012

Species of gastropod

Liotipoma clausa is a species of small sea snail with calcareous opercula, a marine gastropod mollusc in the family Colloniidae.

== Description ==
The shell grows to a height of 4.2 mm.

== Distribution ==
This species occurs in the Pacific Ocean off the Fiji Islands.
