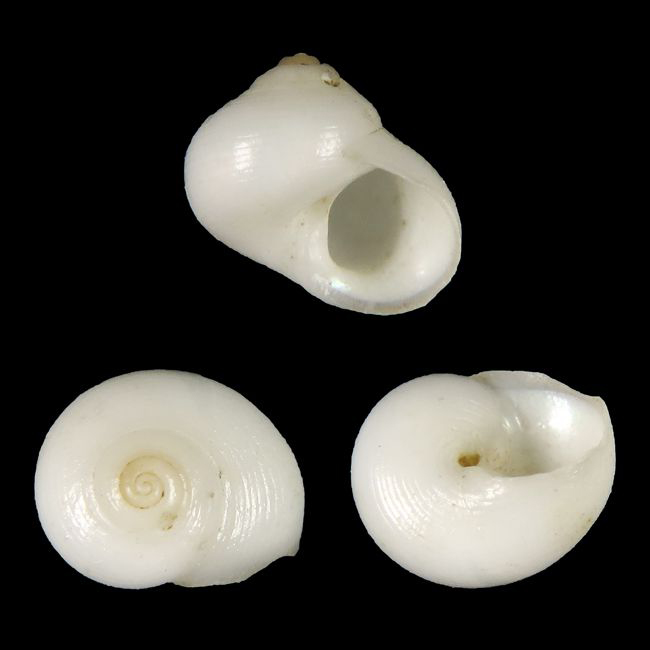

Scientific classification
- Kingdom: Animalia
- Phylum: Mollusca
- Class: Gastropoda
- Subclass: Vetigastropoda
- Order: Trochida
- Family: Colloniidae
- Genus: Homalopoma
- Species: H. mactanense

Binomial name
- Homalopoma mactanense Huang, Fu & Poppe, 2016

= Homalopoma mactanense =

Species of gastropod

Homalopoma mactanense is a species of sea snail, a marine gastropod mollusk in the family Colloniidae.

== Description ==
The length of the shell attains 3.4 mm.

== Distribution ==
This marine species occurs off the Philippines.
