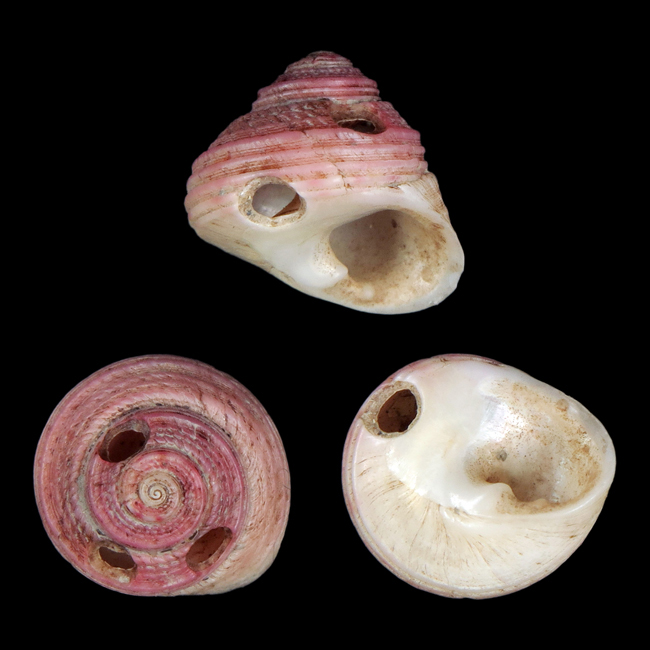

Scientific classification
- Kingdom: Animalia
- Phylum: Mollusca
- Class: Gastropoda
- Subclass: Vetigastropoda
- Order: Trochida
- Family: Colloniidae
- Genus: Homalopoma
- Species: H. hui

Binomial name
- Homalopoma hui Huang, Fu & Poppe, 2016

= Homalopoma hui =

Species of gastropod

Homalopoma hui is a species of sea snail, a marine gastropod mollusk in the family Colloniidae.
