= Homalopoma boffii =

Scientific classification
- Kingdom: Animalia
- Phylum: Mollusca
- Class: Gastropoda
- Subclass: Vetigastropoda
- Order: Trochida
- Superfamily: Trochoidea
- Family: Colloniidae
- Subfamily: Colloniinae
- Genus: Homalopoma
- Species: H. boffii

Binomial name
- Homalopoma boffii Marini, 1975

Species of gastropod

Homalopoma boffii is a species of small sea snail with calcareous opercula, a marine gastropod mollusk in the family Colloniidae.

== Description ==
The shell grows to a height of 7 mm.

== Distribution ==
This species occurs in the Atlantic Ocean off Southern Brazil at a depth between 182 m and 780 m.
