= Homalopoma quantillum =

Scientific classification
- Kingdom: Animalia
- Phylum: Mollusca
- Class: Gastropoda
- Subclass: Vetigastropoda
- Order: Trochida
- Family: Colloniidae
- Genus: Homalopoma
- Species: H. quantillum

Binomial name
- Homalopoma quantillum Gould, 1861

Synonyms
- Collonia quantilla Gould, 1861; Leptothyra quantilla (Gould, 1861)

Species of gastropod

Homalopoma quantillum is a species of sea snail, a marine gastropod mollusk in the family Colloniidae.

Subspecies

- Homalopoma quantillum carmineum (Bartsch, 1915)
- Homalopoma quantillum quantillum (Gould, 1861)

== Description ==
The size of the shell varies between 2 mm and 3.5 mm. It is a small, rose-colored, solid shell with a depressed-orbicular shape. it contains four whorls. The aperture is circular. The outer lip is thick. The columella has a strong slope. The periphery of the base is blunt.

== Distribution ==
This marine species has been found off Jeffrey's Bay, South Africa
