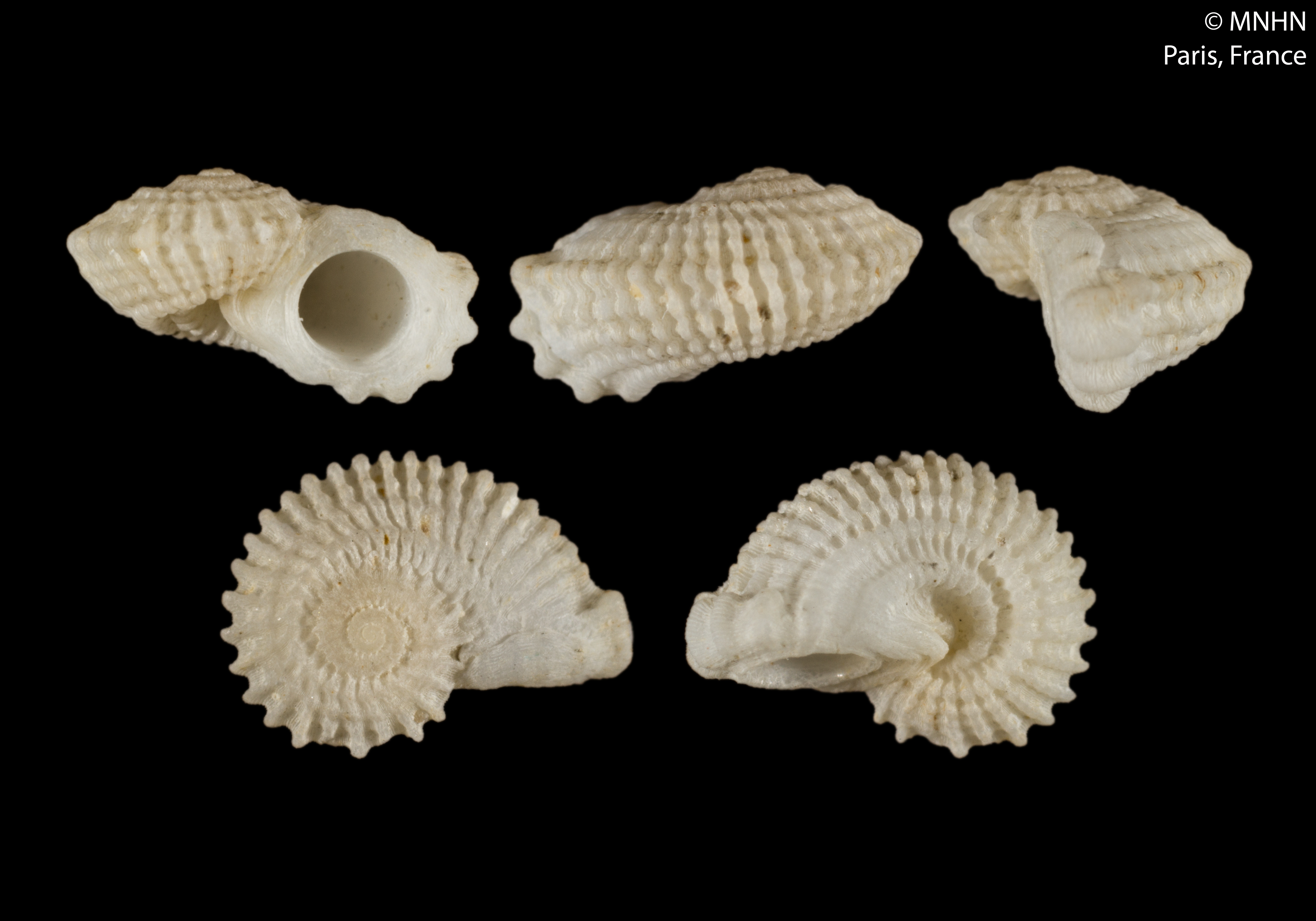
- Shell of Liotipoma mutabilis (holotype at MNHN, Paris)

Scientific classification
- Kingdom: Animalia
- Phylum: Mollusca
- Class: Gastropoda
- Subclass: Vetigastropoda
- Order: Trochida
- Superfamily: Trochoidea
- Family: Colloniidae
- Subfamily: Liotipomatinae
- Genus: Liotipoma
- Species: L. mutabilis

Binomial name
- Liotipoma mutabilis McLean, 2012

= Liotipoma mutabilis =

Species of gastropod

Liotipoma mutabilis is a species of small sea snail with calcareous opercula, a marine gastropod mollusc in the family Colloniidae.

== Description ==
The length of the shell attains 5.7 mm.

== Distribution ==
This marine species occurs off the Loyalty Islands.
