= Homalopoma umbilicatum =

Scientific classification
- Kingdom: Animalia
- Phylum: Mollusca
- Class: Gastropoda
- Subclass: Vetigastropoda
- Order: Trochida
- Family: Colloniidae
- Genus: Homalopoma
- Species: H. umbilicatum

Binomial name
- Homalopoma umbilicatum (Powell, 1926)

Synonyms
- Argalista umbilicata Powell, 1926

Species of gastropod

Homalopoma umbilicatum is a species of small deepwater sea snail with a calcareous operculum, a marine gastropod mollusc in the family Colloniidae.

== Distribution ==
This species occurs in New Zealand.
