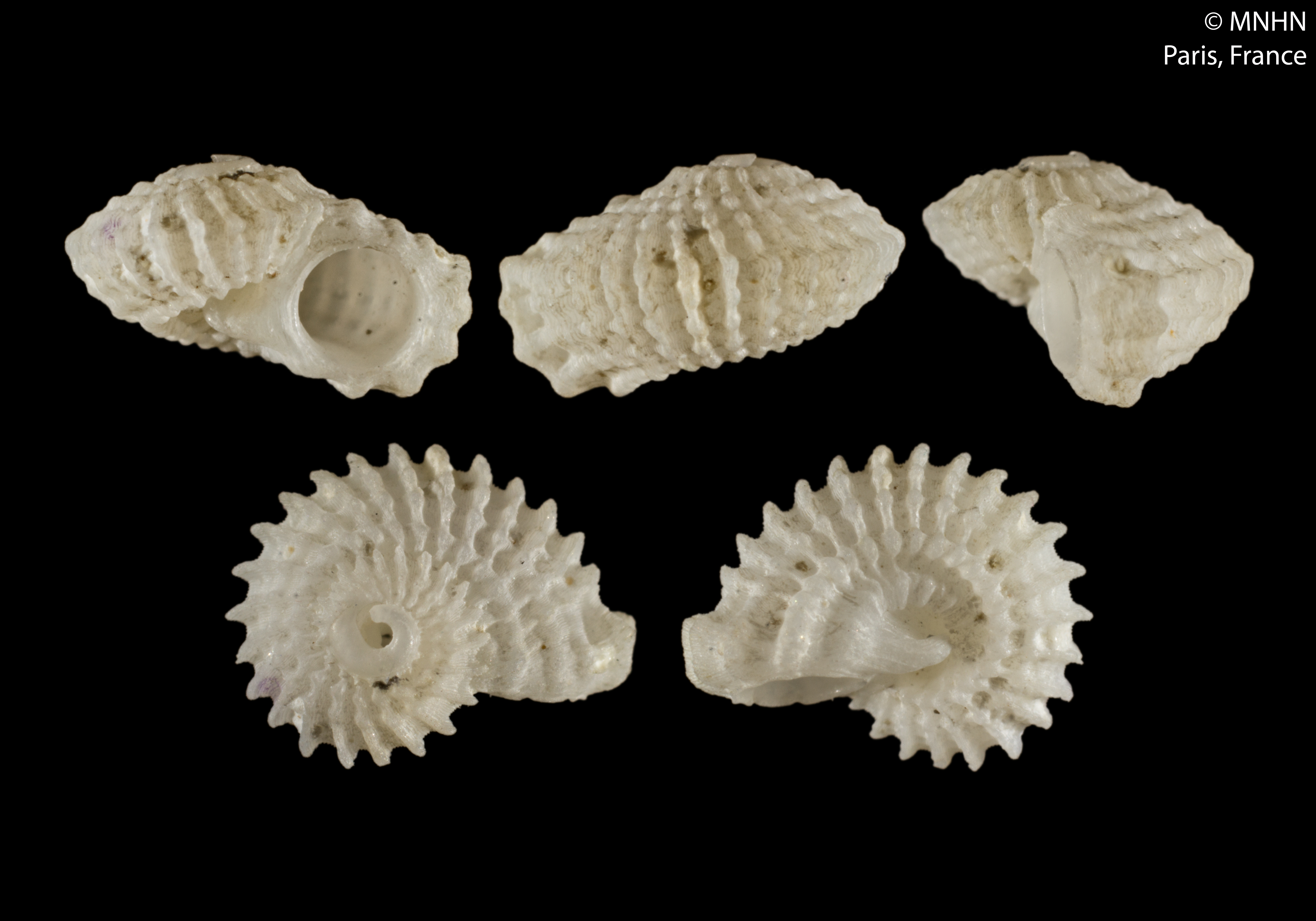
- Shell of Liotipoma lifouensis (holotype at MNHN, Paris)

Scientific classification
- Kingdom: Animalia
- Phylum: Mollusca
- Class: Gastropoda
- Subclass: Vetigastropoda
- Order: Trochida
- Superfamily: Trochoidea
- Family: Colloniidae
- Subfamily: Liotipomatinae
- Genus: Liotipoma
- Species: L. lifouensis

Binomial name
- Liotipoma lifouensis McLean, 2012

= Liotipoma lifouensis =

Species of gastropod

Liotipoma lifouensis is a species of small sea snail with calcareous opercula, a marine gastropod mollusc in the family Colloniidae.

== Description ==
The shell grows to a height of 4.3 mm. The shell has an ivory color and an axial structure protruding from the shell.

== Biology ==
This species is sexually dimorphic. Male shells have bigger tongues that block out their umbilical areas, unlike females, which have a reduced tongue for a bigger umbilical area, which they use for protecting eggs and larva.

== Distribution ==
This marine species occurs off the Loyalty Islands and Lifou Island, with some traces in Fiji and Vanuatu.
