= Pictacollonia donghaiensis =

Scientific classification
- Kingdom: Animalia
- Phylum: Mollusca
- Class: Gastropoda
- Subclass: Vetigastropoda
- Order: Trochida
- Superfamily: Trochoidea
- Family: Colloniidae
- Genus: Pictacollonia
- Species: P. donghaiensis

Binomial name
- Pictacollonia donghaiensis (Z.Z. Dong, 1982)

Synonyms
- Collonia donghaiensis Z.-Z. Dong, 1982 superseded combination; Homalopoma donghaiense (Z.-Z. Dong, 1982) superseded combination

Species of gastropod

Pictacollonia donghaiensis is a species of small sea snail with calcareous opercula, a marine gastropod mollusk in the family Colloniidae.

== Distribution ==
This species occurs in the East China Sea.
