= Anadema macandrewii =

- Drawing of a shell of Anadema macandrewii

Scientific classification
- Kingdom: Animalia
- Phylum: Mollusca
- Class: Gastropoda
- Subclass: Vetigastropoda
- Order: Trochida
- Family: Colloniidae
- Genus: Anadema
- Species: A. macandrewii

Binomial name
- Anadema macandrewii (Mörch 1868)

Synonyms
- Bolma macandrewii (Mørch, 1868); Leptothyra coelata A. Adams, 1854; Turbo (Anadema) macandrewi, Morch, 1868

Species of gastropod

Anadema macandrewii is a species of sea snail, a marine gastropod mollusk in the family Colloniidae,

== Description ==
The umbilicate, reddish yellow shell has an ovate-conoid, trochiform shape. It is thick, slightly elevated, and below subdepressed. The spire is obtuse. It contains 5-6 slightly convex whorls that are longitudinally and obliquely striate, spirally granose-lirate. The suture is impressed. The body whorl is obtusely angular at the middle. It shows 16-18 spiral granose lirae. The small granules are close. The aperture is transversely ovate, and silvery within. The operculum is calcareous. The lip is simple. The narrow columella is arcuate and thickened at the base. The deep umbilicus has a spiral funicle inside; color reddish yellow. Its altitude is 11 mm, its diameter 16 mm.

The species is characterized by the spiral funicle within the umbilicus.

== Distribution ==
This species occurs in the Indian Ocean off East Africa.
