= Homalopoma rubidum =

Scientific classification
- Kingdom: Animalia
- Phylum: Mollusca
- Class: Gastropoda
- Subclass: Vetigastropoda
- Order: Trochida
- Superfamily: Trochoidea
- Family: Colloniidae
- Subfamily: Colloniinae
- Genus: Homalopoma
- Species: H. rubidum

Binomial name
- Homalopoma rubidum (Dall, 1908)

Species of gastropod

Homalopoma rubidum is a species of small sea snail with calcareous opercula, a marine gastropod mollusk in the family Colloniidae.

== Description ==
The shell grows to a height of 10 mm.

== Distribution ==
This species occurs in the Pacific Ocean off Panama.
