= Homalopoma crassicostata =

Scientific classification
- Kingdom: Animalia
- Phylum: Mollusca
- Class: Gastropoda
- Subclass: Vetigastropoda
- Order: Trochida
- Family: Colloniidae
- Genus: Homalopoma
- Species: H. crassicostata

Binomial name
- Homalopoma crassicostata (Murdoch, 1905)

Synonyms
- Leptothyra crassicostata Murdoch, 1905

Species of gastropod

Homalopoma crassicostata is a species of small sea snail, a marine gastropod mollusc in the family Colloniidae.

== Distribution ==
This species occurs in New Zealand.
