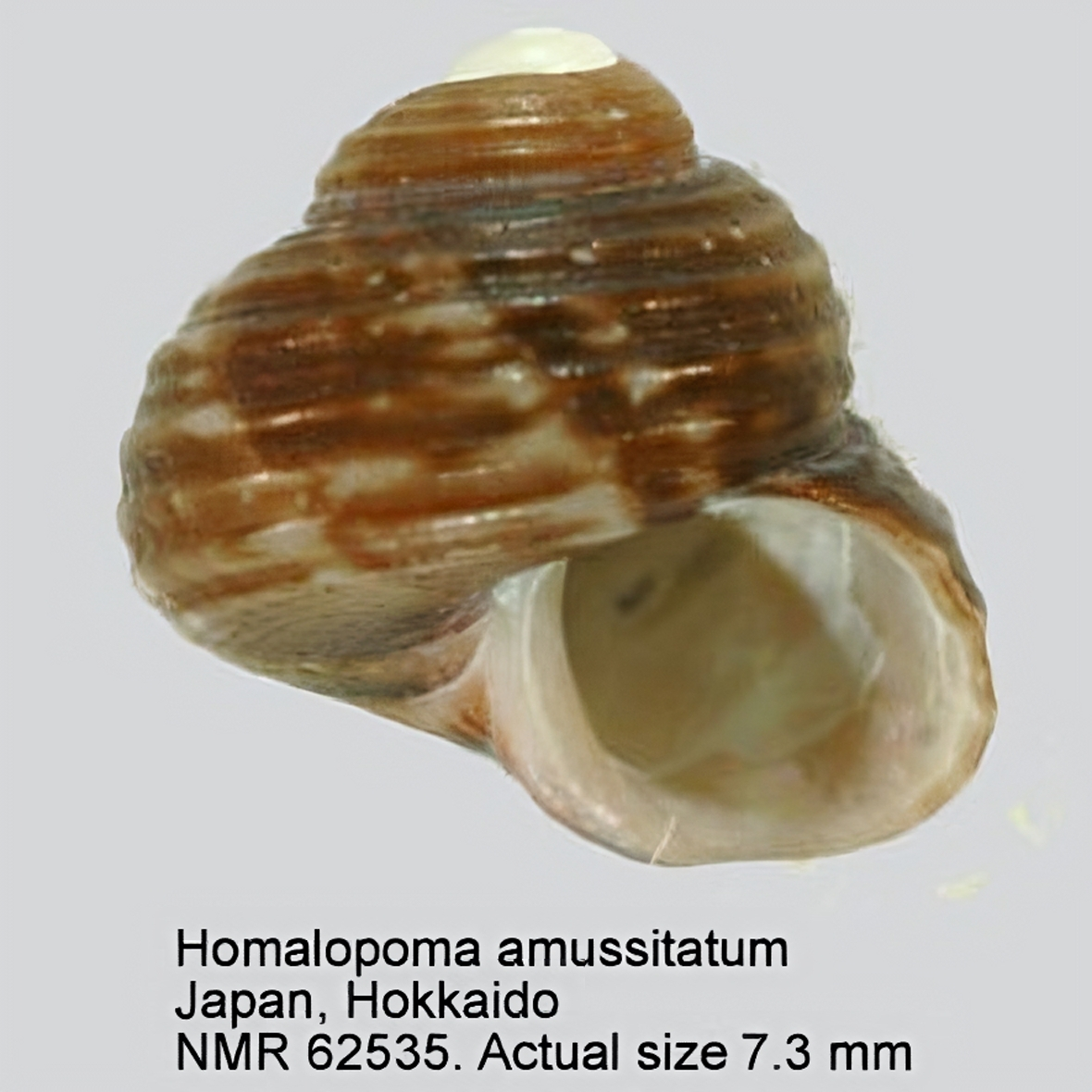

Scientific classification
- Kingdom: Animalia
- Phylum: Mollusca
- Class: Gastropoda
- Subclass: Vetigastropoda
- Order: Trochida
- Superfamily: Trochoidea
- Family: Colloniidae
- Subfamily: Colloniinae
- Genus: Homalopoma
- Species: H. amussitatum

Binomial name
- Homalopoma amussitatum (Gould, 1861)

Synonyms
- Collonia purpurescens Dunker, 1882; Trochus corallinus E. A. Smith, 1875; Turbo amussitatus Gould, 1861

= Homalopoma amussitatum =

Species of gastropod

Homalopoma amussitatum is a species of small sea snail with calcareous opercula, a marine gastropod mollusk in the family Colloniidae.

== Description ==
The height of the shell reaches 16 mm.

== Distribution ==
This marine species occurs off the Kuriles, Russia to northern Japan.
