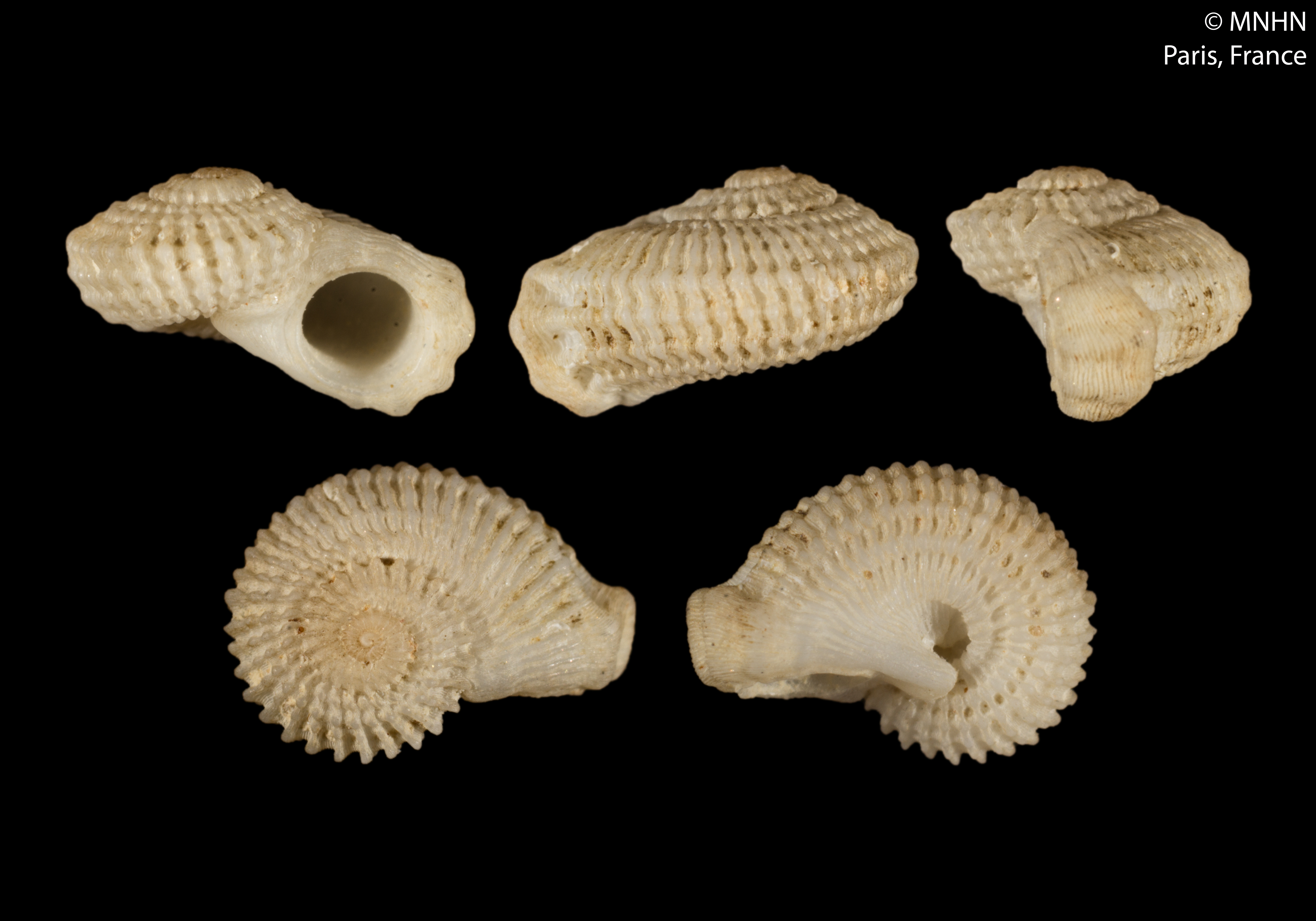
- Shell of Liotipoma splendida (holotype at MNHN, Paris)

Scientific classification
- Kingdom: Animalia
- Phylum: Mollusca
- Class: Gastropoda
- Subclass: Vetigastropoda
- Order: Trochida
- Superfamily: Trochoidea
- Family: Colloniidae
- Subfamily: Liotipomatinae
- Genus: Liotipoma
- Species: L. splendida

Binomial name
- Liotipoma splendida McLean, 2012

= Liotipoma splendida =

Species of gastropod

Liotipoma splendida is a species of small sea snail with calcareous opercula, a marine gastropod mollusk in the family Colloniidae.

== Description ==
The shell grows to a height of 5.1 mm

== Distribution ==
This marine species occurs off New Caledonia.
