= Homalopoma berryi =

Scientific classification
- Kingdom: Animalia
- Phylum: Mollusca
- Class: Gastropoda
- Subclass: Vetigastropoda
- Order: Trochida
- Superfamily: Trochoidea
- Family: Colloniidae
- Subfamily: Colloniinae
- Genus: Homalopoma
- Species: H. berryi

Binomial name
- Homalopoma berryi J. H. McLean, 1964

Species of gastropod

Homalopoma berryi is a species of small sea snail with calcareous opercula, a marine gastropod mollusk in the family Colloniidae.
