= Homalopoma albidum =

Scientific classification
- Kingdom: Animalia
- Phylum: Mollusca
- Class: Gastropoda
- Subclass: Vetigastropoda
- Order: Trochida
- Family: Colloniidae
- Genus: Homalopoma
- Species: H. albidum

Binomial name
- Homalopoma albidum (Dall, 1881)

Synonyms
- Leptothyra induta var. albida Dall, 1881

Species of gastropod

Homalopoma albidum, common name the white dwarf turban, is a species of sea snail, a marine gastropod mollusc in the family Colloniidae.

== Distribution ==
This species occurs in the Caribbean Sea, the Gulf of Mexico and the Lesser Antilles; in the Atlantic Ocean off North Carolina at depths between 64 m and 1832 m.
