= Homalopoma granuliferum =

Scientific classification
- Kingdom: Animalia
- Phylum: Mollusca
- Class: Gastropoda
- Subclass: Vetigastropoda
- Order: Trochida
- Family: Colloniidae
- Genus: Homalopoma
- Species: H. granuliferum

Binomial name
- Homalopoma granuliferum Nomura & Hatai, 1940

Species of gastropod

Homalopoma granuliferum is a species of sea snail, a marine gastropod mollusc in the family Colloniidae.

== Description ==
The height of the shell varies between 4 mm and 7 mm.

== Distribution ==
This marine species occurs off Japan and in the East China Sea.
