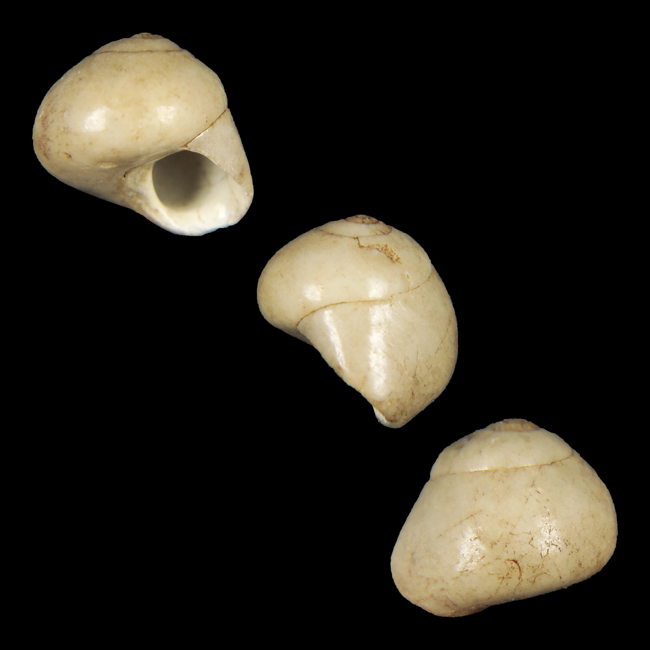

Scientific classification
- Kingdom: Animalia
- Phylum: Mollusca
- Class: Gastropoda
- Subclass: Vetigastropoda
- Order: Trochida
- Family: Colloniidae
- Genus: Homalopoma
- Species: H. unicum

Binomial name
- Homalopoma unicum Huang, Fu & Poppe, 2016

= Homalopoma unicum =

Species of gastropod

Homalopoma unicum is a species of minute sea snail, a marine gastropod mollusk in the family Colloniidae.

== Description ==
Like other members of its genus, Homalopoma unicum have small shells with the length of the shell attaining 4.2 mm. Its body symmetry is dextrally coiled along with its mineralized skeleton containing mostly calcium and calcium carbonate.

== Distribution ==
This marine species occurs off the coast of the Philippines, mostly near Mactan island, Cebu.

== Original description ==
- Huang S.-I, Fu I-F. & Poppe G.T. (2016). Taiwanese and Philippine Colloniidae. Nomenclatural remarks and the description of 17 new species (Gastropoda: Colloniidae). Visaya. 4(5): 4-42. page(s): 26.
