= Depressipoma laddi =

Scientific classification
- Kingdom: Animalia
- Phylum: Mollusca
- Class: Gastropoda
- Subclass: Vetigastropoda
- Order: Trochida
- Superfamily: Trochoidea
- Family: Colloniidae
- Subfamily: Liotipomatinae
- Genus: Depressipoma
- Species: D. laddi

Binomial name
- Depressipoma laddi McLean, 2012

Synonyms
- Liotina (Austroliotia) cf. L. botanica (Hedley)” – Ladd 1966

Species of gastropod

Depressipoma laddi is a species of small sea snail with calcareous opercula, a marine gastropod mollusc in the family Colloniidae.

== Description ==
The shell grows to a height of 3.3 mm.

== Distribution ==
This species occurs in the Pacific Ocean off the Marshall Islands.
