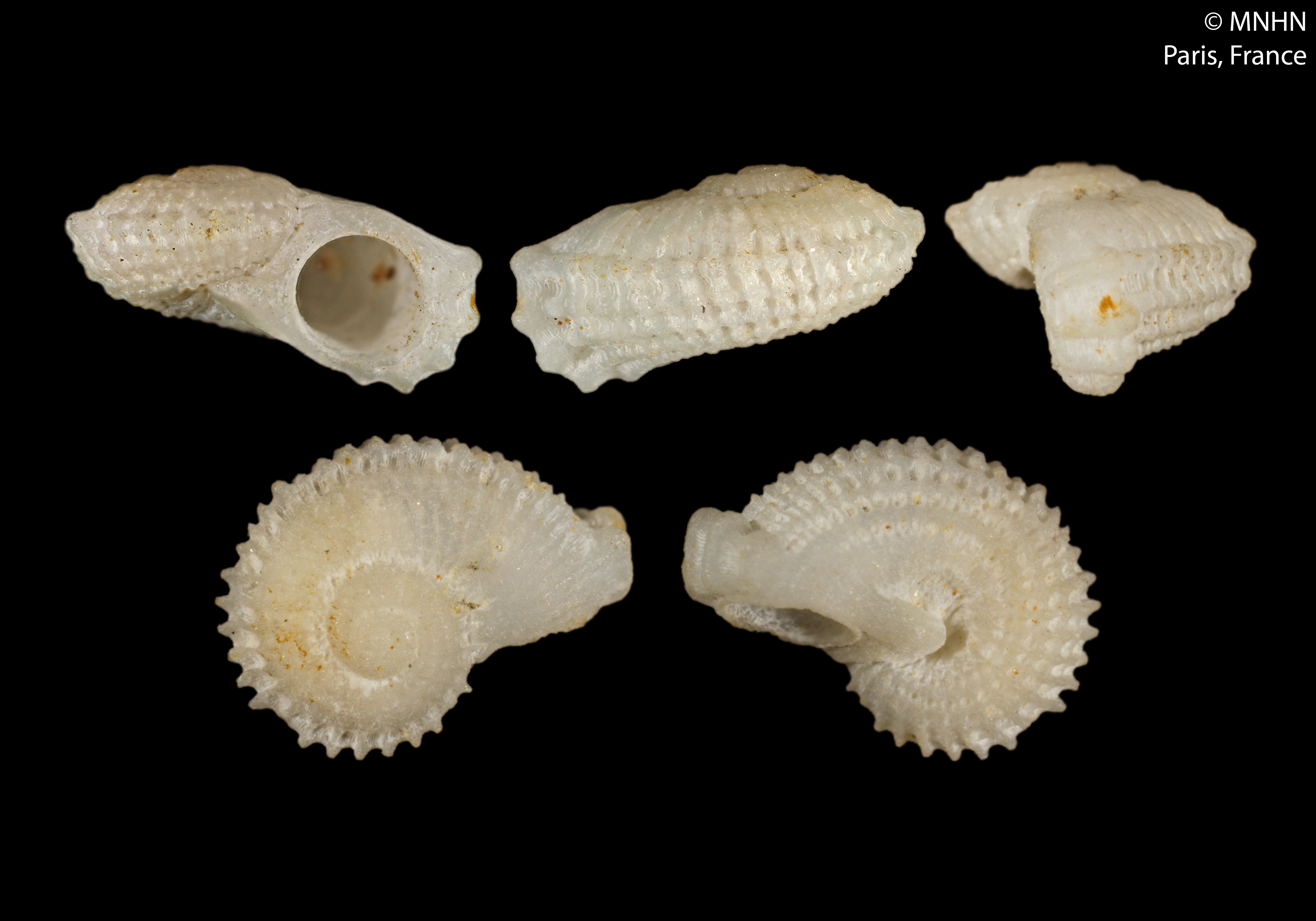
- Shells of Liotipoma wallisensis (holotype at MNHN, Paris)

Scientific classification
- Kingdom: Animalia
- Phylum: Mollusca
- Class: Gastropoda
- Subclass: Vetigastropoda
- Order: Trochida
- Family: Colloniidae
- Genus: Liotipoma
- Species: L. wallisensis

Binomial name
- Liotipoma wallisensis McLean & Kiel, 2007

= Liotipoma wallisensis =

Species of gastropod

Liotipoma wallisensis is a species of sea snail, a marine gastropod mollusk in the family Colloniidae.

== Description ==
The size of the shell varies between 3.5 mm and 4.5 mm.

== Distribution ==
This marine species occurs off Wallis Island, Polynesia.
