= Homalopoma maculatum =

Scientific classification
- Kingdom: Animalia
- Phylum: Mollusca
- Class: Gastropoda
- Subclass: Vetigastropoda
- Order: Trochida
- Superfamily: Trochoidea
- Family: Colloniidae
- Subfamily: Colloniinae
- Genus: Homalopoma
- Species: H. maculatum

Binomial name
- Homalopoma maculatum Golikov & Gulbin, 1978

Species of gastropod

Homalopoma maculatum is a species of small sea snail with calcareous opercula, a marine gastropod mollusk in the family Colloniidae.

== Description ==
The shell grows to a size of 3 mm.

== Distribution ==
This species occurs in the Pacific Ocean off the Kurile Islands.
