= Homalopoma lacunatum =

Scientific classification
- Kingdom: Animalia
- Phylum: Mollusca
- Class: Gastropoda
- Subclass: Vetigastropoda
- Order: Trochida
- Superfamily: Trochoidea
- Family: Colloniidae
- Subfamily: Colloniinae
- Genus: Homalopoma
- Species: H. lacunatum

Binomial name
- Homalopoma lacunatum (Carpenter, 1864)

Synonyms
- Homalopoma engbergi (Willett, 1929)

Species of gastropod

Homalopoma lacunatum, common name the Engberg dwarf turban, is a species of small sea snail with calcareous opercula, a marine gastropod mollusk in the family Colloniidae.
