= Homalopoma clippertonense =

Scientific classification
- Kingdom: Animalia
- Phylum: Mollusca
- Class: Gastropoda
- Subclass: Vetigastropoda
- Order: Trochida
- Superfamily: Trochoidea
- Family: Colloniidae
- Subfamily: Colloniinae
- Genus: Homalopoma
- Species: H. clippertonense

Binomial name
- Homalopoma clippertonense (Hertlein & Emerson, 1953)

Synonyms
- Clanculus clippertonensis Hertlein & Emerson 1953 (original combination); Homalopoma (Panocochlea) clippertonense Hertlein, L.G. & W.K. Emerson, 1953

Species of gastropod

Homalopoma clippertonense is a species of small sea snail, with calcareous opercula, a marine gastropod mollusk in the family Colloniidae.

== Distribution ==
This marine species occurs off Baja California, Mexico; Clipperton Island; San Benedict Island.
