= Planacollonista rosea =

Scientific classification
- Kingdom: Animalia
- Phylum: Mollusca
- Class: Gastropoda
- Subclass: Vetigastropoda
- Order: Trochida
- Superfamily: Trochoidea
- Family: Colloniidae
- Genus: Planacollonista
- Species: P. rosea

Binomial name
- Planacollonista rosea (Tenison Woods, 1876)

Synonyms
- Argalista rosea (Tenison Woods, 1876) superseded combination; Monilea rosea Tenison Woods, 1876 superseded combination

Species of gastropod

Planacollonista rosea is a species of small sea snail with calcareous opercula, a marine gastropod mollusk in the family Colloniidae.

== Description ==
(Original description) The shell is minute and turbinate (top-shaped), with a widely umbilicate base. Its color is rose, often variegated with white spots. In some specimens, this small shell exhibits an intense carmine color.

It has four rounded whorls which are encircled with alternating large and small white striae (lines or grooves).

The aperture is entire and rounded. The outer lip is produced (extended) very much from the suture, which gives the aperture a sunken appearance. The inner lip is simple. The umbilical margin is furnished with a somewhat inconspicuous white corrugated umbilicus. The callosity at the umbilicus is only perceptible under a lens in very good specimens.
