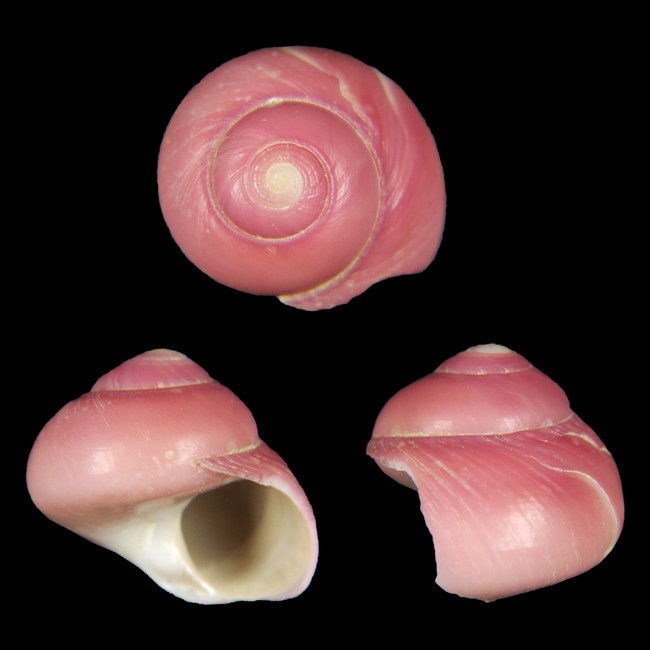

Scientific classification
- Kingdom: Animalia
- Phylum: Mollusca
- Class: Gastropoda
- Subclass: Vetigastropoda
- Order: Trochida
- Family: Colloniidae
- Genus: Homalopoma
- Species: H. imberculi

Binomial name
- Homalopoma imberculi Huang, Fu & Poppe, 2016

= Homalopoma imberculi =

Species of gastropod

Homalopoma imberculi is a species of sea snail, a marine gastropod mollusk in the family Colloniidae.

== Original description ==
- Huang S.-I, Fu I-F. & Poppe G.T. (2016). Taiwanese and Philippine Colloniidae. Nomenclatural remarks and the description of 17 new species (Gastropoda: Colloniidae). Visaya. 4(5): 4-42.

page(s): 15.
