= Depressipoma kwajaleina =

Scientific classification
- Kingdom: Animalia
- Phylum: Mollusca
- Class: Gastropoda
- Subclass: Vetigastropoda
- Order: Trochida
- Superfamily: Trochoidea
- Family: Colloniidae
- Subfamily: Liotipomatinae
- Genus: Depressipoma
- Species: D. kwajaleina

Binomial name
- Depressipoma kwajaleina McLean, 2012

Species of gastropod

Depressipoma kwajaleina is a species of small sea snail with calcareous opercula, a marine gastropod mollusc in the family Colloniidae.

== Description ==
The shell grows to a height of 3.2 mm.

== Distribution ==
This marine species occurs in the Pacific Ocean off the Kwajalein Atoll, Marshall Islands.
