= Depressipoma pentegoniostoma =

Scientific classification
- Kingdom: Animalia
- Phylum: Mollusca
- Class: Gastropoda
- Subclass: Vetigastropoda
- Order: Trochida
- Family: Colloniidae
- Subfamily: Liotipomatinae
- Genus: Depressipoma
- Species: D. pentegoniostoma

Binomial name
- Depressipoma pentegoniostoma (H. Adams, 1873)

Synonyms
- Bothropoma cf. bellula Bosch et al, 1995; Bothropoma bellulum (H. Adams, 1873); Bothropoma pentegoniostoma (P. P. Carpenter, 1856) superseded combination; Cyclostrema pentegoniostoma P. P. Carpenter, 1856 superseded combination; Liotia bellula H. Adams, 1873 junior subjective synonym; Neocollonia bellula (H. Adams, 1873); Neocollonia pentegoniostoma (P. P. Carpenter, 1856) superseded combination

Species of gastropod

Depressipoma pentegoniostoma is a species of small sea snail with calcareous opercula, a marine gastropod mollusk in the family Colloniidae.

== Description ==
(Original description in Latin) The subdiscoidal shell is small and somewhat solid. It is white in color. The shell contains 5 whorls, the last two being typical. The shell is encircled by five keels: one on the spire, a very prominent one at the periphery, faintly undulated with obscure tubercles, one on the base, and two below the large umbilicus. The entire surface is finely and densely striated transversely. The circular aperture is slightly detached and angular due to the keels.

== Distribution ==
This marine species occurs in the Red Sea, Arabian Sea and the Persian Gulf.
