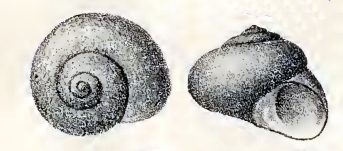
- Drawing with two views of a shell of Homalopoma cunninghami

Scientific classification
- Kingdom: Animalia
- Phylum: Mollusca
- Class: Gastropoda
- Subclass: Vetigastropoda
- Order: Trochida
- Superfamily: Trochoidea
- Family: Colloniidae
- Subfamily: Colloniinae
- Genus: Homalopoma
- Species: H. cunninghami

Binomial name
- Homalopoma cunninghami (E. A. Smith, 1881)

Synonyms
- Leptothyra cunninghami (E. A. Smith, 1881); Turbo cunninghami (E. A. Smith, 1881)

= Homalopoma cunninghami =

Species of gastropod

Homalopoma cunninghami is a species of small sea snail with calcareous opercula, a marine gastropod mollusk in the family Colloniidae.

== Description ==
The height of the shell varies between 4 mm and 5.5 mm. The small, rose-madder shell has a sub globose shape. It is perforated in the young state, but when adult imperforate, it contains 42 whorls, the apical one whitish, the rest convex, and finely spirally striated. The shell is also marked with faint oblique lines of growth. The suture is rather profound. The body whorl descends obliquely near the lip. It is somewhat flattened beneath near the center. The aperture is obliquely subcircular and iridescent within. The pearly columella is spread over the umbilicus. The labrum has a narrow pinkish margin within.

== Distribution ==
This marine species is found at depths between 13 m and 665 m off Patagonia, Tierra del Fuego and the Falkland Islands.
