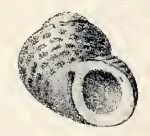
- Drawing of a shell of Homalopoma tapparonei

Scientific classification
- Kingdom: Animalia
- Phylum: Mollusca
- Class: Gastropoda
- Subclass: Vetigastropoda
- Order: Trochida
- Superfamily: Trochoidea
- Family: Colloniidae
- Subfamily: Colloniinae
- Genus: Homalopoma
- Species: H. tapparonei

Binomial name
- Homalopoma tapparonei (Caramagna, 1888)

Synonyms
- Gibbula tapparonei Caramagna, 1888

= Homalopoma tapparonei =

Species of gastropod

Homalopoma tapparonei is a species of small sea snail with calcareous opercula, a marine gastropod mollusk in the family Colloniidae.

== Description ==
The small, turbiniform shell grows to a height of 3 mm. It is very thick. The short spire is obtuse. The apex is mammillated. The shell contains four whorls. The first two are smooth and very rapidly increasing. The remainder are convex. They are ornamented with spiral ridges or cords. These ridges are costiform, rounded, regular, as wide as the interstices, and ornamented with blood-red spots. These spots are here and there interrupted, sometimes disposed in nearly regular series parallel with the axis, and more obscure on the posterior part of the body whorl. The white interstices between the ridges are profound and sulciform. The body whorl is more produced than the spire, quite inflated. It is rounded at the periphery, depressed on the base and umbilicated. The umbilicus is very narrow, white and encircled by a white zone. The rounded aperture is oblique and simple. The peristome shows a light thickening. The shell is within white, or painted like the outside. The simple suture is somewhat impressed.

== Distribution ==
This species occurs in the Red Sea and in the Gulf of Oman.
