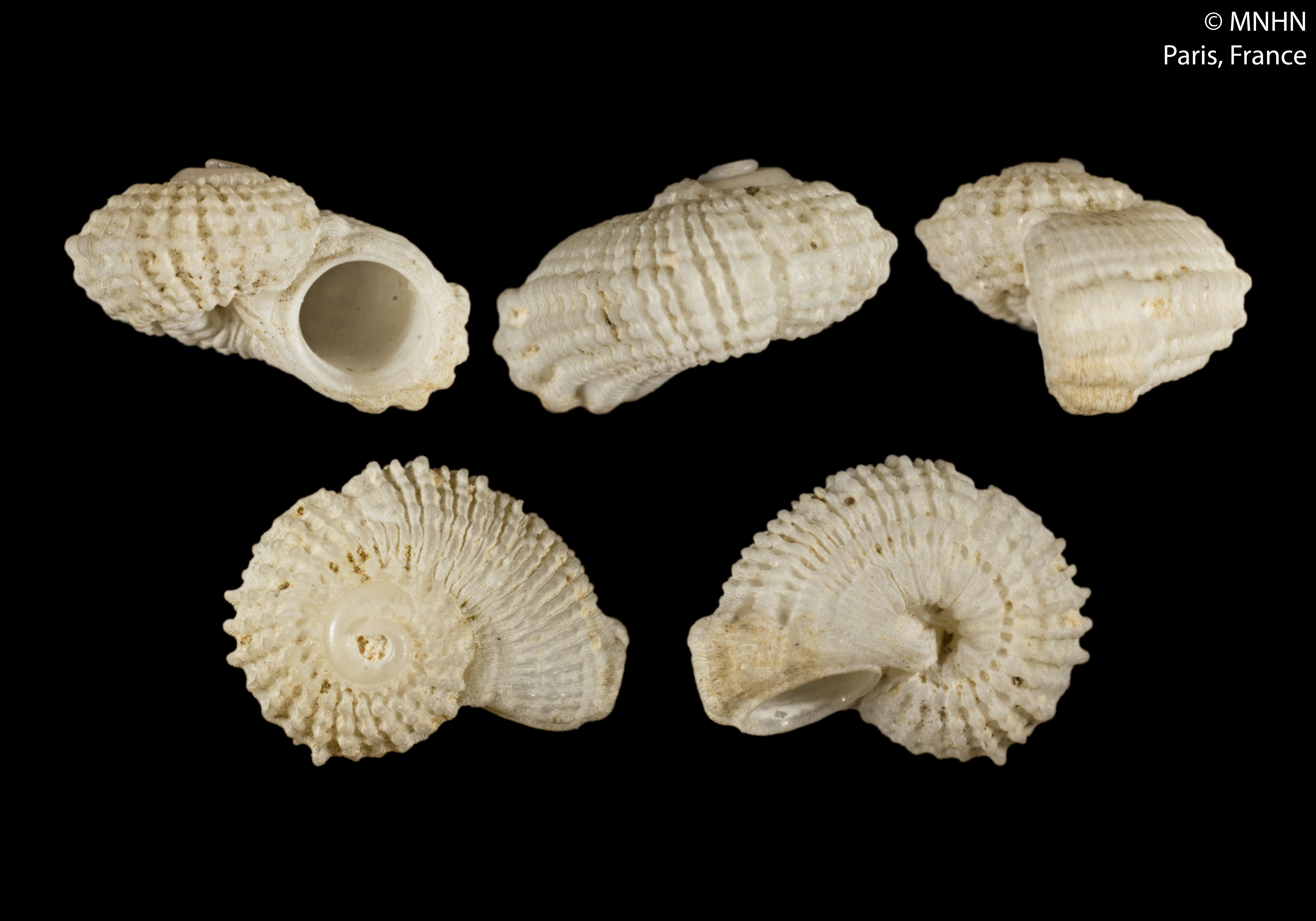
- Shell of Liotipoma magna (holotype at MNHN, Paris)

Scientific classification
- Kingdom: Animalia
- Phylum: Mollusca
- Class: Gastropoda
- Subclass: Vetigastropoda
- Order: Trochida
- Superfamily: Trochoidea
- Family: Colloniidae
- Subfamily: Liotipomatinae
- Genus: Liotipoma
- Species: L. magna

Binomial name
- Liotipoma magna McLean, 2012

= Liotipoma magna =

Species of sea snail

Liotipoma magna is a species of small sea snail in the family Colloniidae. It is a marine gastropod mollusc characterized by its small shell and calcareous operculum. The species was described by James Hamilton McLean in 2012 as part of a study of colloniid gastropods from Indo-Pacific coral reef environments.

== Description ==
Liotipoma magna has a small, calcareous shell. The shell measures approximately 5 mm to 6.8 mm in size. As in other members of the Colloniidae, the animal possesses a calcareous operculum, which is used to close the aperture of the shell when the animal withdraws into it.

The species was described from material examined by McLean in his revisionary work on colloniid gastropods from Indo-Pacific coral reefs. The holotype is deposited in the Muséum national d'Histoire naturelle (MNHN) in Paris.

== Taxonomy ==
Liotipoma magna belongs to the family Colloniidae, a group of marine gastropods within the clade Vetigastropoda. The species was described by American malacologist James Hamilton McLean in 2012. Its description formed part of a larger taxonomic treatment of colloniid species from Indo-Pacific coral reef habitats.

McLean's 2012 study also introduced the subfamily Liotipomatinae, reflecting the distinctive morphological characteristics of members of this group.

== Distribution ==
Liotipoma magna is a marine species recorded from Vanuatu in the southwestern Pacific Ocean. The species was included by McLean among colloniid gastropods associated with Indo-Pacific coral reef environments.

== Habitat ==
The species is known from marine environments associated with the tropical Indo-Pacific. Its occurrence in Vanuatu places it within the diverse reef-associated molluscan fauna of the southwestern Pacific. More detailed information on its depth range, microhabitat and ecology is not currently included in the cited taxonomic sources.
