= Homalopoma draperi =

Scientific classification
- Kingdom: Animalia
- Phylum: Mollusca
- Class: Gastropoda
- Subclass: Vetigastropoda
- Order: Trochida
- Superfamily: Trochoidea
- Family: Colloniidae
- Subfamily: Colloniinae
- Genus: Homalopoma
- Species: H. draperi

Binomial name
- Homalopoma draperi J. H. McLean, 1984

Species of gastropod

Homalopoma draperi, common name Draper's dwarf turban, is a species of small sea snail with calcareous opercula, a marine gastropod mollusk in the family Colloniidae.

== Distribution ==
This species occurs in the Pacific Ocean off Catalina Island, California, USA
