= Homalopoma bicolor =

Conservation status
- Least Concern (IUCN 3.1)

Scientific classification
- Kingdom: Animalia
- Phylum: Mollusca
- Class: Gastropoda
- Subclass: Vetigastropoda
- Order: Trochida
- Family: Colloniidae
- Genus: Homalopoma
- Species: H. bicolor

Binomial name
- Homalopoma bicolor Okutani, 2001

Species of gastropod

Homalopoma bicolor is a species of sea snail, a marine gastropod mollusc in the family Colloniidae.

== Distribution ==
This marine species occurs off Japan.
