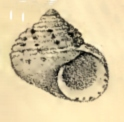
- Drawing of a shell of Homalopoma maculosa

Scientific classification
- Kingdom: Animalia
- Phylum: Mollusca
- Class: Gastropoda
- Subclass: Vetigastropoda
- Order: Trochida
- Family: Colloniidae
- Genus: Homalopoma
- Species: H. maculosa

Binomial name
- Homalopoma maculosa (Pease, 1868)

Synonyms
- Collonia maculosa Pease, 1868; Leptothyra maculosa Pease, 1862

= Homalopoma maculosa =

Species of gastropod

Homalopoma maculosa is a species of sea snail, a marine gastropod mollusc in the family Colloniidae.

== Description ==
The white shell is small, globose and umbilicate. It is rather thin and shining. It is concentrically irregularly ribbed. The interstices are grooved, concave and transversely very faintly striate The ribs are spotted remotely with rose red. The altitude is about equal to the diameter. The subsutural rib is frequently nodose. The umbilicus is crenated within the margin.

== Distribution ==
This species occurs in the Pacific Ocean off French Polynesia, Hawaii and the Marshall Islands.
