= Paraliotipoma =

Scientific classification
- Kingdom: Animalia
- Phylum: Mollusca
- Class: Gastropoda
- Subclass: Vetigastropoda
- Order: Trochida
- Superfamily: Trochoidea
- Family: Colloniidae
- Subfamily: Liotipomatinae
- Genus: Paraliotipoma; McLean, 2012

Genus of gastropods

Paraliotipoma is a genus of small sea snails with calcareous opercula, marine gastropod mollusks in the family Colloniidae.

== Species ==
Species within the genus Paraliotipoma include:

- Paraliotipoma sirenkoi McLean, 2012
