= Gloriacollonia =

Scientific classification
- Kingdom: Animalia
- Phylum: Mollusca
- Class: Gastropoda
- Subclass: Vetigastropoda
- Order: Trochida
- Superfamily: Trochoidea
- Family: Colloniidae
- Genus: Gloriacollonia; Poppe, Tagaro & S.-I Huang, 2023

Type species
- Homalopoma eoa M. Azuma, 1972

Genus of gastropods

Gloriacollonia is a genus of sea snails, marine gastropod mollusks in the subfamily Colloniinae of the family Colloniidae.

== Species ==
Species within the genus Gloriacollonia include:

- Gloriacollonia concors (S.-I Huang, I-F. Fu & Poppe, 2016)
- Gloriacollonia eoa (M. Azuma, 1972)
