= Planacollonista =

Scientific classification
- Kingdom: Animalia
- Phylum: Mollusca
- Class: Gastropoda
- Subclass: Vetigastropoda
- Order: Trochida
- Family: Colloniidae
- Genus: Planacollonista; Poppe, Tagaro & S.-I Huang, 2023

Type species
- Turbo naninus Souverbie, 1864

Genus of gastropods

Planacollonista is a genus of sea snails, marine gastropod mollusks in the subfamily Colloniinae of the family Colloniidae.

== Species ==
- Planacollonista arneghysi Poppe, Tagaro & S.-I Huang, 2023
- Planacollonista nanina (Souverbie, 1864)
- Planacollonista polongi Poppe, Tagaro & S.-I Huang, 2025
- Planacollonista rosa (Pilsbry, 1904)
- Planacollonista rosea (Tenison Woods, 1876)
