= Leptocollonia =

Scientific classification
- Kingdom: Animalia
- Phylum: Mollusca
- Class: Gastropoda
- Subclass: Vetigastropoda
- Order: Trochida
- Family: Colloniidae
- Subfamily: Colloniinae
- Genus: Leptocollonia; Powell, 1951

Type species
- Leptocollonia thielei A. W. B. Powell, 1951

Genus of gastropods

Leptocollonia is a genus of sea snails, marine gastropod mollusks in the family Colloniidae.

== Species ==
Species within the genus Leptocollonia include:

- Leptocollonia innocens (Thiele, 1912)
- Leptocollonia thielei A. W. B. Powell, 1951
