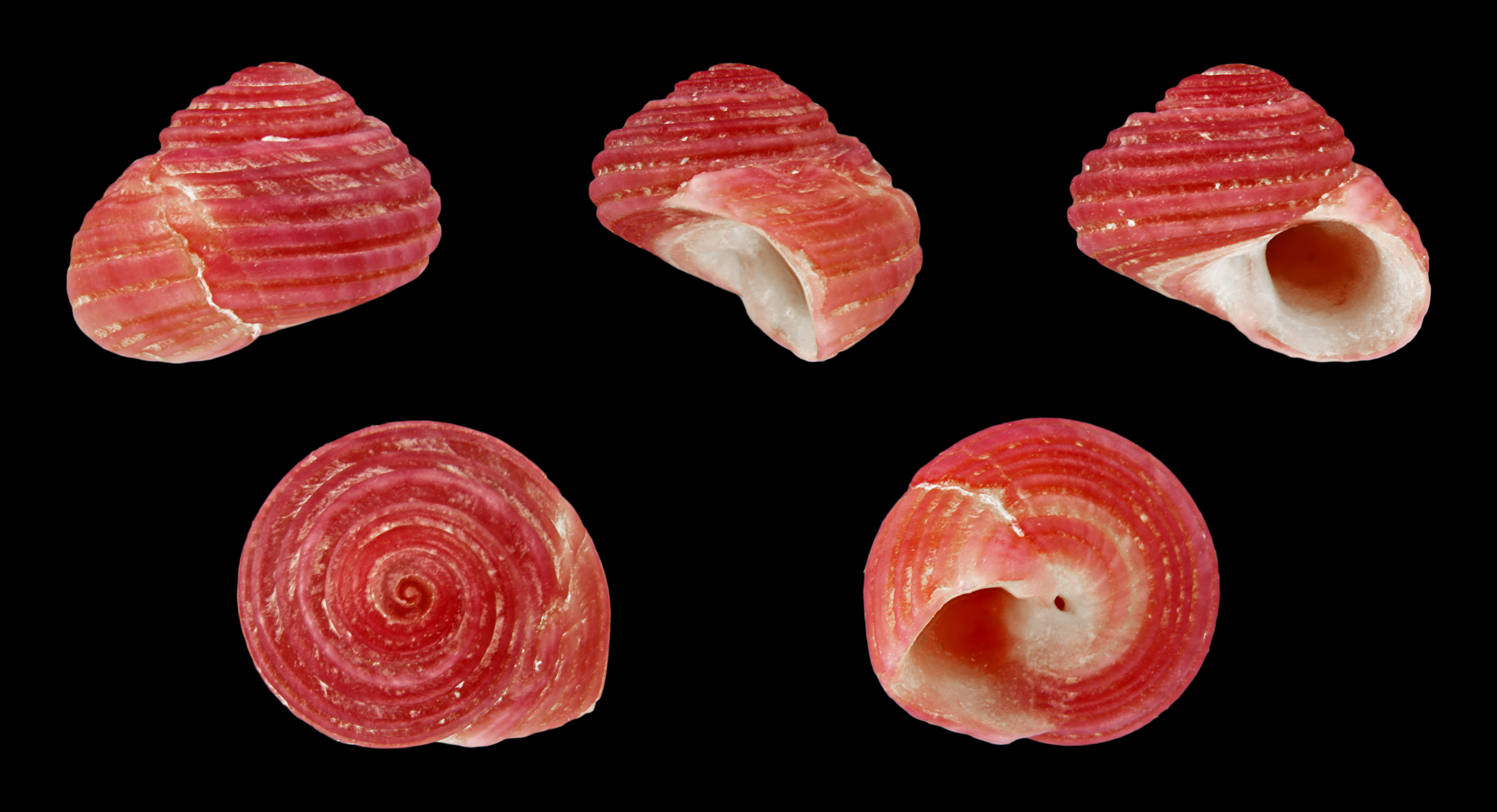
- A shell of Homalopoma sanguineum

Scientific classification
- Kingdom: Animalia
- Phylum: Mollusca
- Class: Gastropoda
- Subclass: Vetigastropoda
- Order: Trochida
- Family: Colloniidae
- Genus: Homalopoma
- Species: H. sanguineum

Binomial name
- Homalopoma sanguineum (Linnaeus, 1758)

Synonyms
- Leptothyra sanguinea Linnaeus, 1758; Turbo sanguineum Linnaeus, 1758

= Homalopoma sanguineum =

Species of gastropod

Homalopoma sanguineum is a species of sea snail, a marine gastropod mollusc in the family Colloniidae.

== Description ==
The shell is very small, its length measuring 3.5 – 4 mm and it is 6.5 mm wide. The small, very solid, shell has a depressed, orbicular shape with a conic spire. The 4½-5 whorls are convex and strongly spirally lirate. These lirae are smooth, about twelve in number on the body whorl, three on penultimate whorl, not perceptibly crenulated by the very subtle incremental stride. Above the lirae are coarse, smooth, and generally irregularly spaced. The interstices are smooth, as wide or wider than the ribs. Below they become more finely lirate The body whorl is well rounded and deflected anteriorly. The rounded aperture somewhat contracted, oblique, and pearly white within. The peristome is rather thick, its ends not converging. The columella is short, slightly arcuate, thick and heavy. It terminates below in an obtuse tubercle. The base of the deep crimson aperture bears sometimes an inconspicuous dentiform callus at its margin.

== Habitat and distribution ==
This herbivorous snail lives on rocks and other surfaces in the Mediterranean Sea and the Red Sea. It feeds on algae.
