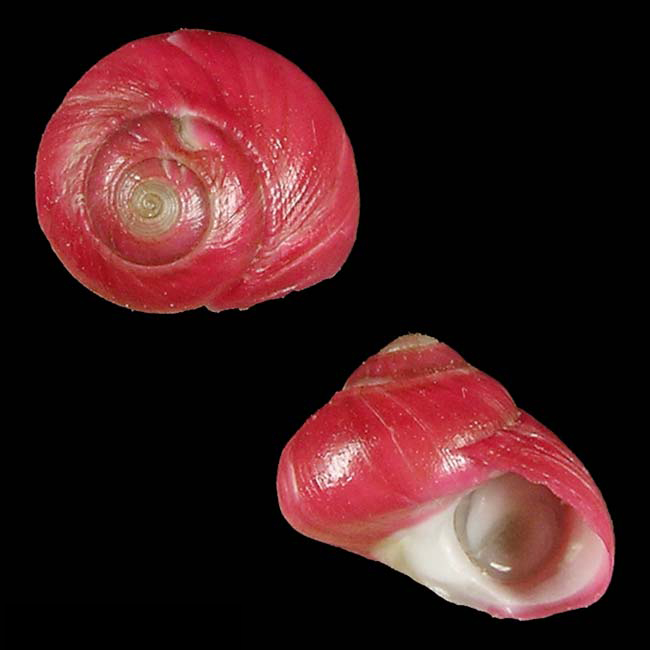

Scientific classification
- Kingdom: Animalia
- Phylum: Mollusca
- Class: Gastropoda
- Subclass: Vetigastropoda
- Order: Trochida
- Family: Colloniidae
- Genus: Gloriacollonia
- Species: G. concors

Binomial name
- Gloriacollonia concors (Huang, Fu & Poppe, 2016)

Synonyms
- Homalopoma concors S.-I Huang, I-F. Fu & Poppe, 2016 superseded combination

= Gloriacollonia concors =

Species of gastropod

Gloriacollonia concors is a species of sea snail, a marine gastropod mollusk in the family Colloniidae.

== Distribution ==
This marine species occurs off the Philippines and off the Solomon Islands.

== Original description ==
Huang S.-I; Fu I-F.; Poppe G.T. (2016). "Taiwanese and Philippine Colloniidae. Nomenclatural remarks and the description of 17 new species (Gastropoda: Colloniidae)". Visaya. 4 (5): 11.
