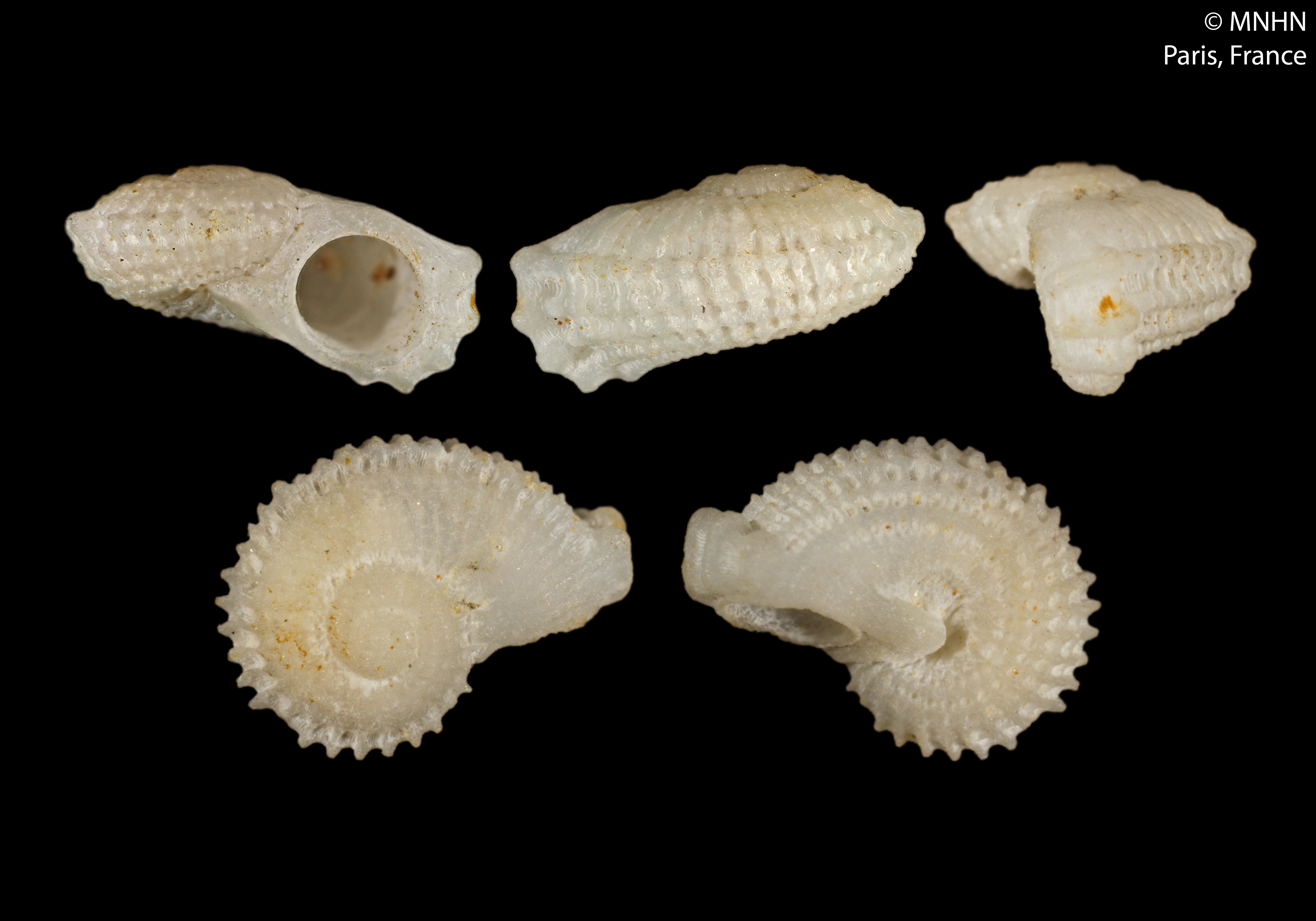
- Shells of Liotipoma wallisensis

Scientific classification
- Kingdom: Animalia
- Phylum: Mollusca
- Class: Gastropoda
- Subclass: Vetigastropoda
- Order: Trochida
- Superfamily: Trochoidea
- Family: Colloniidae
- Subfamily: Liotipomatinae
- Genus: Liotipoma; McLean & Kiel, 2007

Type species
- Liotipoma wallisensis McLean & Kiel, 2007

= Liotipoma =

Genus of gastropods

Liotipoma is a genus of sea snails, marine gastropod mollusks in the family Colloniidae.

== Species ==
Species within the genus Liotipoma include:

- Liotipoma clausa McLean, 2012
- Liotipoma dimorpha McLean, 2012
- Liotipoma lifouensis McLean, 2012
- Liotipoma magna McLean, 2012
- Liotipoma mutabilis McLean, 2012
- Liotipoma solaris McLean, 2012
- Liotipoma splendida McLean, 2012
- Liotipoma wallisensis McLean & Kiel, 2007
