= Depressipoma =

Scientific classification
- Kingdom: Animalia
- Phylum: Mollusca
- Class: Gastropoda
- Subclass: Vetigastropoda
- Order: Trochida
- Superfamily: Trochoidea
- Family: Colloniidae
- Subfamily: Liotipomatinae
- Genus: Depressipoma; McLean, 2012

Type species
- Depressipoma kwajaleina McLean, J.H., 2012

Genus of gastropods

Depressipoma is a genus of small sea snails with calcareous opercula, marine gastropod mollusks in the family Colloniidae.

== Species ==
Species within the genus Depressipoma include:

- Depressipoma kwajaleina McLean, 2012
- Depressipoma laddi McLean, 2012
- Depressipoma pentegoniostoma (P. P. Carpenter, 1856)
