= Pictacollonia =

Scientific classification
- Kingdom: Animalia
- Phylum: Mollusca
- Class: Gastropoda
- Subclass: Vetigastropoda
- Order: Trochida
- Superfamily: Trochoidea
- Family: Colloniidae
- Genus: Pictacollonia; Poppe, Tagaro & S.-I Huang, 2023

Type species
- Homalopoma tagaroae S.-I Huang, I-F. Fu & Poppe, 2016

Genus of gastropods

Pictacollonia is a genus of small sea snails with calcareous opercula, marine gastropod mollusks in the family Colloniidae.

== Species ==
Species within the genus Pictacollonia include:

- Pictacollonia boucheti Poppe, Tagaro & S.-I Huang, 2023
- Pictacollonia donghaiensis (Z.-Z. Dong, 1982)
- Pictacollonia ellenstrongae Poppe, Tagaro & S.-I Huang, 2023
- Pictacollonia fijiensis Poppe, Tagaro & S.-I Huang, 2023
- Pictacollonia hardyi Poppe, Tagaro & S.-I Huang, 2023
- Pictacollonia imberculi (S.-I Huang, I-F. Fu & Poppe, 2016)
- Pictacollonia julieae Poppe, Tagaro & S.-I Huang, 2023
- Pictacollonia keyurare (S.-I Huang, I-F. Fu & Poppe, 2016)
- Pictacollonia nebulosa Poppe, Tagaro & S.-I Huang, 2023
- Pictacollonia ornamentaria Poppe, Tagaro & S.-I Huang, 2023
- Pictacollonia pseudotagaroae Poppe, Tagaro & S.-I Huang, 2023
- Pictacollonia salmonis Poppe, Tagaro & S.-I Huang, 2023
- Pictacollonia tagaroae (S.-I Huang, I-F. Fu & Poppe, 2016)
