= Anadema =

- Drawing of a shell of Anadema macandrewii

Scientific classification
- Kingdom: Animalia
- Phylum: Mollusca
- Class: Gastropoda
- Subclass: Vetigastropoda
- Order: Trochida
- Family: Colloniidae
- Subfamily: Colloniinae
- Genus: Anadema; H. Adams & A. Adams, 1855

Synonyms
- Omphalius (Anadema) H. Adams & A. Adams, 1854 (original combination)

Genus of gastropods

Anadema is a genus of sea snails, marine gastropod mollusks in the family Colloniidae.

This name is evidently a junior homonym of Anadema Meuschen, 1787 (Echinodermata).

== Species ==
Species within the genus Anadema include:

- Anadema macandrewii (Mörch 1868)
