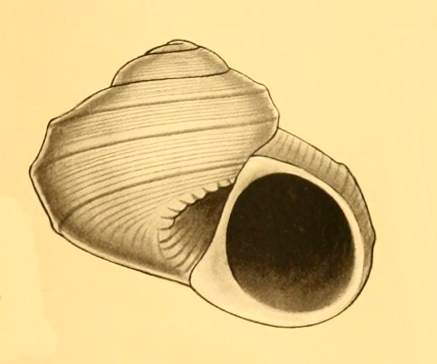
- Shell of Orbiscollonia variecostata

Scientific classification
- Kingdom: Animalia
- Phylum: Mollusca
- Class: Gastropoda
- Subclass: Vetigastropoda
- Order: Trochida
- Family: Colloniidae
- Genus: Orbiscollonia; Poppe, Tagaro & S.-I Huang, 2023

Type species
- Orbiscollonia mixta Poppe, Tagaro & S.-I Huang, 2023

= Orbiscollonia =

Genus of gastropods

Orbiscollonia is a genus of sea snails, marine gastropod mollusks in the subfamily Thermocolloniinae of the family Colloniidae.

== Species ==
- Orbiscollonia arenula (E. A. Smith, 1890)
- Orbiscollonia mixta Poppe, Tagaro & S.-I Huang, 2023
- Orbiscollonia pacifica Poppe, Tagaro & S.-I Huang, 2023
- Orbiscollonia variecostata (A. W. B. Powell, 1937)
