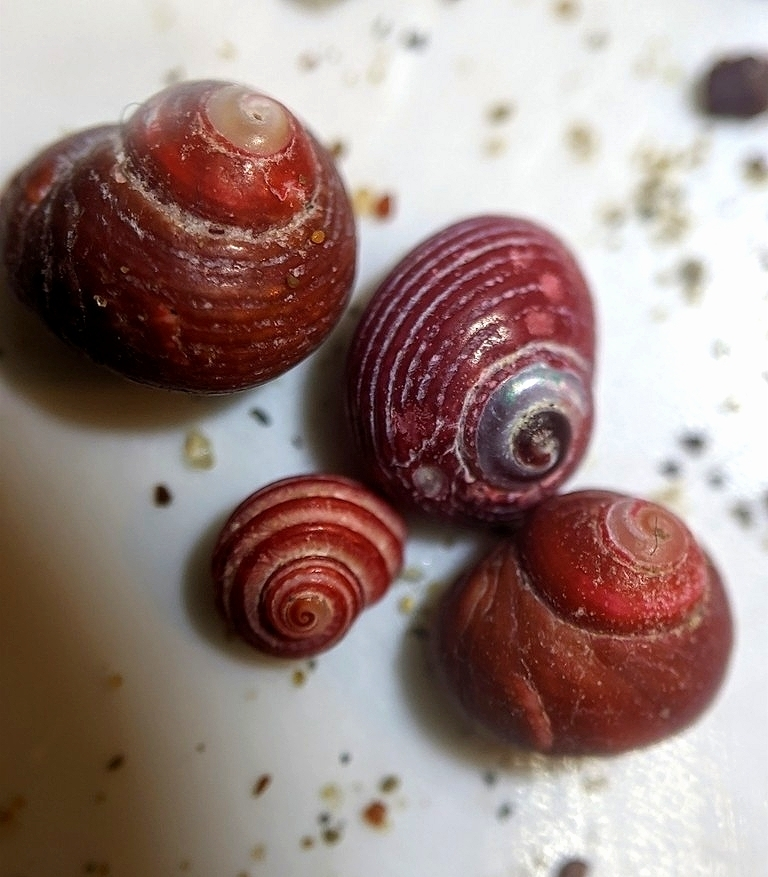

Scientific classification
- Kingdom: Animalia
- Phylum: Mollusca
- Class: Gastropoda
- Subclass: Vetigastropoda
- Order: Trochida
- Superfamily: Trochoidea
- Family: Colloniidae
- Subfamily: Colloniinae
- Genus: Gigahomalopoma
- Species: G. luridum

Binomial name
- Gigahomalopoma luridum (Dall, 1885)

Synonyms
- Homalopoma luridum (Dall, 1885); Homalopoma carpenteri (Pilsbry, 1888); Homalopoma juanensis (Dall, 1919); Leptothyra carpenteri Pilsbry, 1888; Leptothyra coccineus Deshayes, G.P., 1833

= Gigahomalopoma luridum =

Species of gastropod

Gigahomalopoma luridum, with the common names Dall's dwarf turban or dark dwarf-turban snail, is a species of small sea snail with calcareous opercula, a marine gastropod mollusk in the family Colloniidae.

== Description ==
The height of the shell varies between 6 mm and 10 mm. Its color is red, ashen or purple. The small, globose shell is very solid and imperforate. The spire is conic, more or less depressed. The suture is moderately impressed. There are five whorls. These are slightly convex, the last decidedly deflected toward the aperture, encircled by about fifteen subequal spiral lirae, separated by interstices about as wide as the ridges. The incremental striae are generally strongly developed, causing the liree to appear nodose or somewhat irregular, and the interstices to appear pitted. The oblique aperture is pearly white within. It measures about half the length of shell. The columella is arcuate. The base of the shell is obsoletely uni- bi- or tri-dentate. The rounded oval operculum is nearly smooth and slightly concave in the middle.

== Distribution ==
This species occurs in abundant numbers in the Pacific Ocean under rocks and an shale at low tide from Sitka, Alaska to Northern Baja California, Mexico.
