= Turbo pustulatus =

Scientific classification
- Kingdom: Animalia
- Phylum: Mollusca
- Class: Gastropoda
- Subclass: Vetigastropoda
- Order: Trochida
- Family: Turbinidae
- Genus: Turbo
- Species: T. pustulatus

Binomial name
- Turbo pustulatus Brocchi, 1821

Synonyms
- Homalopoma pustulatum (Brocchi, 1821); Turbo (Turbo) pustulatus Helbling, G.S., 1779

Species of gastropod

Turbo pustulatus is a species of sea snail, a marine gastropod mollusk in the family Turbinidae, the turban snails.

This has become a nomen dubium.

== Distribution ==
This marine species occurs in the Red Sea and in the Indian Ocean off Madagascar.
