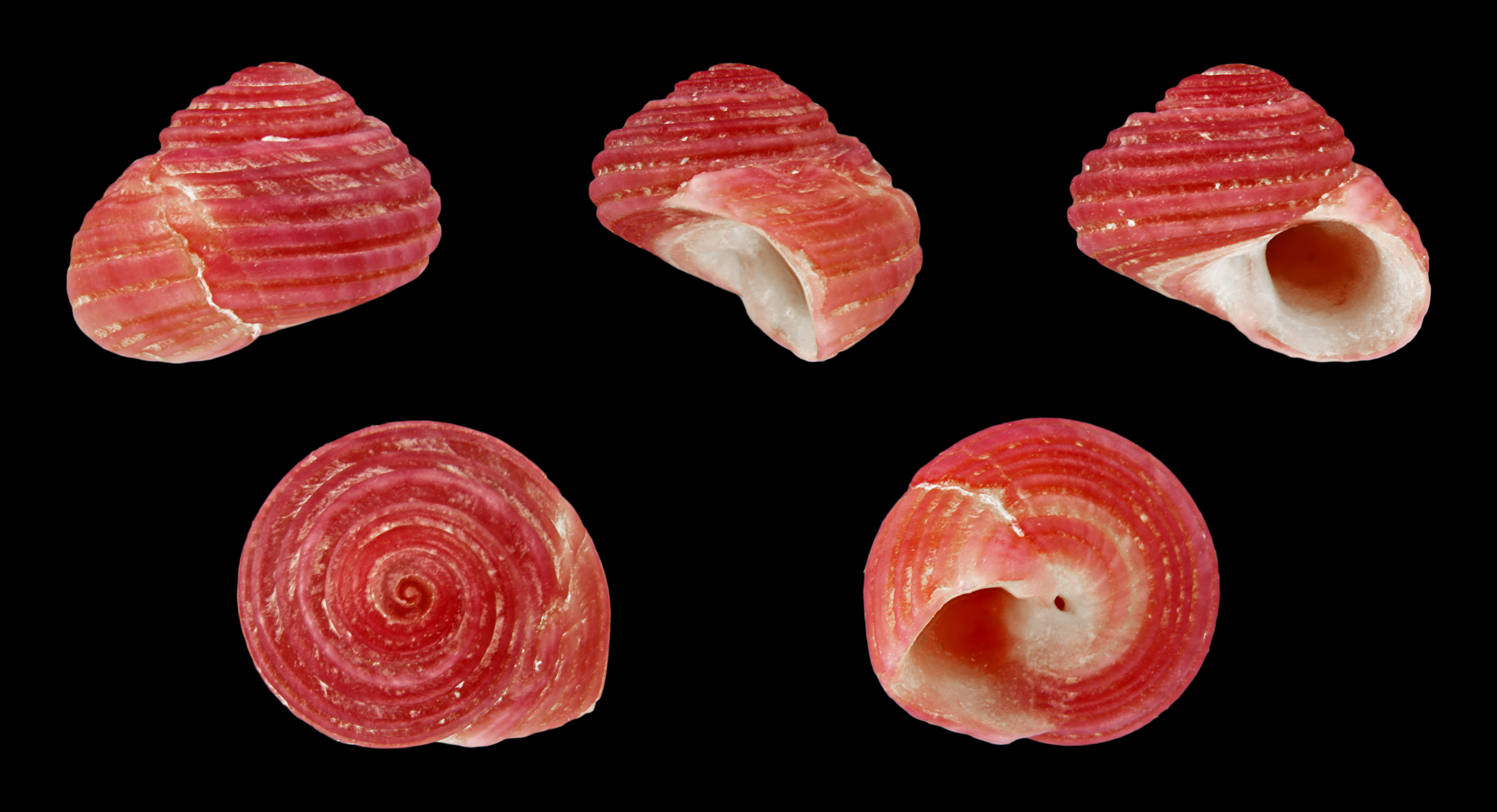
- Homalopoma sanguineum shell
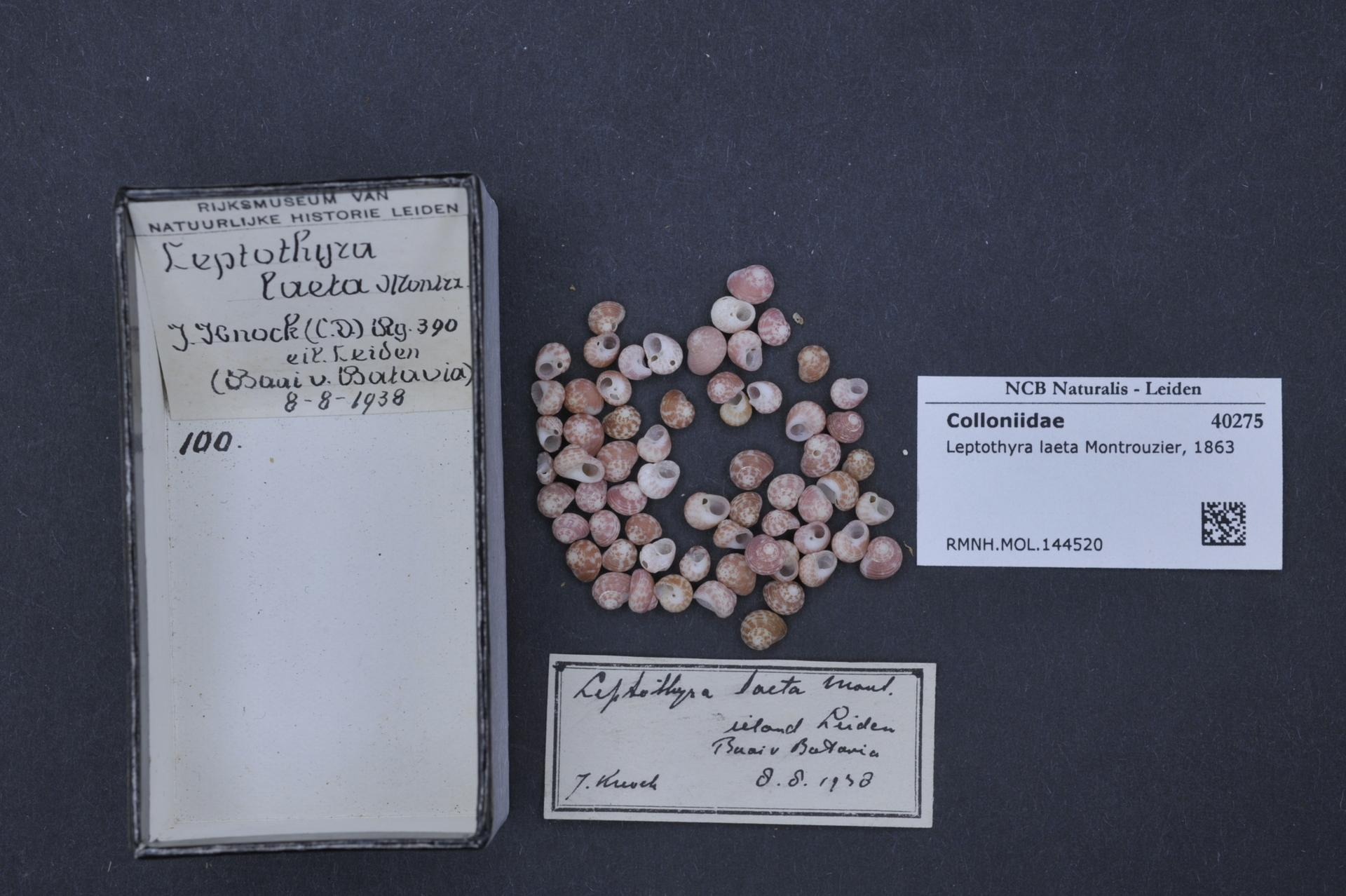
- Collonia granulosa shells

Scientific classification
- Kingdom: Animalia
- Phylum: Mollusca
- Class: Gastropoda
- Subclass: Vetigastropoda
- Order: Trochida
- Superfamily: Trochoidea
- Family: Colloniidae; Cossmann, 1917

= Colloniidae =

Family of gastropods

Colloniidae is a family of small sea snails with calcareous opercula, marine gastropod mollusks in the clade Vetigastropoda.

== Genera ==
Genera in the family Colloniidae include:

Subfamily Colloniinae Cossmann, 1917

- Anadema H. & A. Adams, 1854: belongs to the Turbinidae
- Argalista Iredale, 1915
- Artiscollonia Poppe, Tagaro & S.-I Huang, 2023
- † Circulopsis Cossmann, 1902
- Circumcollonia Poppe, Tagaro & S.-I Huang, 2023
- † Cirsochilus Cossmann, 1888 †
- † Cochleochilus Cossmann, 1918
- Collonia Gray, 1850
- Collonista Iredale, 1918
- Complicatacollonista Poppe, Tagaro & S.-I Huang, 2023
- † Cyniscella Cossmann, 1888
- Emiliotia Faber, 2006
- Gigahomalopoma Poppe, Tagaro & S.-I Huang, 2023
- Glabracollonia Poppe, Tagaro & S.-I Huang, 2023
- Gloriacollonia Poppe, Tagaro & S.-I Huang, 2023
- Homalopoma Carpenter, 1864
- Leptothyra sensu Pease, 1869
- Magnihomalopoma Poppe, Tagaro & S.-I Huang, 2023
- Margaritacollonia Poppe, Tagaro & S.-I Huang, 2023
- Mexicocollonia Poppe & Tagaro, 2026
- Microcollonia Poppe, Tagaro & S.-I Huang, 2023
- Neocollonia Kuroda & T. Habe, 1954
- † Otomphalus Cossmann, 1902
- Panocochlea Dall, 1908
- Pictacollonia Poppe, Tagaro & S.-I Huang, 2023
- Planacollonista Poppe, Tagaro & S.-I Huang, 2023
- Pulchracollonia Poppe, Tagaro & S.-I Huang, 2023
- Trochicollonia Poppe, Tagaro & S.-I Huang, 2023
- † Vertesella J. Szabó, 2012
- † Vexinia Cossmann, 1918

Subfamily † Crossostomatinae L. R. Cox, 1960

- † Adeorbisina Greco, 1899
- † Costataphrus Gründel, 2007
- † Crossostoma J. Morris & Lycett, 1851
- † Helicocryptus A. d'Orbigny, 1850

Subfamily † Lewisiellinae Gründel, 2008

- † Lewisiella Stoliczka, 1868

Subfamily Liotipomatinae McLean, 2012

- Depressipoma McLean, 2012
- Liotipoma McLean & Kiel, 2007
- Paraliotipoma McLean, 2012
- Rhombipoma McLean, 2012

Subfamily Moelleriinae Hickman & McLean, 1990

- Leptocollonia A. W. B. Powell, 1951
- Moelleria Jeffreys, 1865
- Spiromoelleria Baxter & McLean, 1984

Subfamily † Petropomatinae Cox, 1960

- † Petropoma Gabb, 1877

Subfamily Thermocolloniinae Poppe, Tagaro & S.-I Huang, 2023

- Cantrainea Jeffreys, 1883
- Escondidacantrainea Poppe, Tagaro & S.-I Huang, 2023
- Intaglicollonia Hickman, 2013 †
- Orbiscollonia Poppe, Tagaro & S.-I Huang, 2023
- Phanerolepida Dall, 1907
- Planasolidum Poppe, Tagaro & S.-I Huang, 2023
- Squamahomalopoma Poppe, Tagaro & S.-I Huang, 2023
- Thermocollonia Okutani & Fujikura, 1990
- Triangularis Poppe, Tagaro & S.-I Huang, 2023

Subfamily Colloniidae incertae sedis (temporary name)

- † Eutinochilus Cossmann, 1918
- † Hikidea Kaim, R. G. Jenkins, Tanabe & Kiel, 2014
- † Rangimata Marwick, 1928
- † Torusataphrus Gründel, Keupp & F. Lang, 2017

Synonyms

- * Bothropoma Thiele, 1924: synonym of Neocollonia Kuroda & T. Habe, 1954 (junior homonym of Geophorus (Bothropoma) A. J. Wagner, 1908)
- subfamily Bothropomatinae Thiele, 1924: synonym of Colloniinae Cossmann, 1917 (invalid: type genus is a junior homonym)
- † Boutillieria Cossmann, 1888 : synonym of † Homalopoma (Boutillieria) Cossmann, 1888 represented as Homalopoma P. P. Carpenter, 1864 (superseded rank)
- Contundere Poppe, Tagaro & S.-I Huang, 2023: synonym of Panocochlea Dall, 1908 (junior objective synonym)
- † Helyocryptus: synonym of † Helicocryptus A. d'Orbigny, 1850 (incorrect subsequent spelling of Helicocryptus d'Orbigny, 1850)
- Leptonyx P. P. Carpenter, 1864: synonym of Homalopoma P. P. Carpenter, 1864 (junior homonym of Leptonyx Swainson, 1833 [Aves]; Homalopoma is a replacement name)
- Leptothyla: synonym of Leptothyra sensu Pease, 1869 (misspelling)
- Leptothyra J. G. Cooper, 1867: synonym of Homalopoma P. P. Carpenter, 1864 (junior objective synonym of Homalopoma)
- Molleria Jeffreys, 1865: synonym of Moelleria Jeffreys, 1865 ( unjustified emendation)
- † Tipua Marwick, 1943: synonym of † Cirsochilus Cossmann, 1888 (junior subjective synonym)
