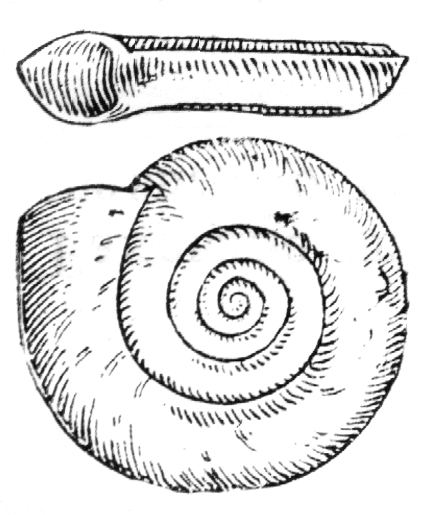
- Drawing of a shell of Planorbis planorbis

Scientific classification
- Kingdom: Animalia
- Phylum: Mollusca
- Class: Gastropoda
- Superorder: Hygrophila
- Family: Planorbidae
- Subfamily: Planorbinae
- Tribe: Planorbini
- Genus: Planorbis; O. F. Müller, 1774

Species
- See text

Synonyms
- Tropidiscus Stein, 1850

= Planorbis =

Planorbis Temporal range: Jurassic–recent

Genus of gastropods

Planorbis is a genus of air-breathing freshwater snails, aquatic pulmonate gastropod molluscs in the family Planorbidae, the ram's horn snails, or planorbids. All species in this genus have sinistral or left-coiling shells.

== Description ==
Planorbis shells are flat-coiled and sinistral.

== Distribution ==
This genus has a worldwide distribution. It is known from the Jurassic to the Recent periods.

== Human Uses ==
Species in the genus Planorbis have long been used in the aquarium trade, with references going back as far as 1921.

== Species ==
Extant species currently in Planorbis

- Planorbis agraulus Bourguignat, 1864
- Planorbis atticus Bourguignat, 1852
- Planorbis carinatus O. F. Müller, 1774
- Planorbis cretensis Glöer & Hirschfelder, 2015
- Planorbis intermixtus Mousson, 1874
- Planorbis kubanicus Soldatenko & Starobogatov, 1998
- Planorbis macedonicus Sturany, 1894
- Planorbis moquini Requien, 1848
- Planorbis planorbis (Linnaeus, 1758)
- Planorbis presbensis Sturany, 1894
- Planorbis sieversi Mousson, 1873
- Planorbis vitojensis Glöer & Pešić, 2010

Fossil species (selection)

- † Planorbis anceps Sacco, 1884
- † Planorbis austroalpinus Harzhauser & Neubauer in Harzhauser et al., 2012
- † Planorbis bouei Pavlović, 1932
- † Planorbis fischeri Wenz, 1919
- † Planorbis gladilini Pavlović, 1931
- † Planorbis kochi Pavlović, 1927
- † Planorbis nisseanus Pavlović, 1931
- † Planorbis petrovici Pavlović, 1931
- † Planorbis striatus Serres, 1853
- † Planorbis truncatocarinatus Pavlović, 1931
- † Planorbis verticilloides Pavlović, 1931
- † Planorbis zivkovici Pavlović, 1931
- † Planorbis (Jalpuchorbis) bolgradensis Prysjazhnjuk & Kovalenko, 1986
- † Planorbis (Jalpuchorbis) roshkai Prysjazhnjuk & Kovalenko, 1986

Suggenera and species brought into synonymy

- Subgenus Planorbis (Anisus) Studer, 1820: synonym of Anisus Studer, 1820
- Subgenus Planorbis (Armiger) Hartmann, 1843 : synonym of Gyraulus (Armiger) Hartmann, 1843 represented as Gyraulus Charpentier, 1837
- Subgenus Planorbis (Bathyomphalus) Charpentier, 1837: synonym of Bathyomphalus Charpentier, 1837
- Subgenus Planorbis (Coretus) Gray, 1847: synonym of Planorbarius Duméril, 1805
- Subgenus Planorbis (Gyraulus) Agassiz in Charpentier, 1837: synonym of Gyraulus Charpentier, 1837
- † Planorbis (Gyraulus) declivis var. balizacensis Peyrot, 1932: synonym of † Anisus balizacensis (Peyrot, 1932)
- Subgenus Planorbis (Gyrorbis) Fitzinger, 1833: synonym of Valvata O. F. Müller, 1774
- Subgenus Planorbis (Odontogyrorbis) Lörenthey, 1906: synonym of Anisus (Anisus) Studer, 1820
- Subgenus Planorbis (Segmentina) Fleming, 1818: synonym of Segmentina Fleming, 1818
- Planorbis acronicus Férussac, 1807: synonym of Gyraulus acronicus (Férussac, 1807)
- Planorbis albus O. F. Müller, 1774: synonym of Gyraulus albus (O. F. Müller, 1774)
- Planorbis argaeicus Sturany, 1904: synonym of Gyraulus argaeicus (Sturany, 1904)
- Planorbis atkinsoni Johnston, 1879: synonym of Gyraulus atkinsoni (Johnston, 1879)
- Planorbis biwaensis Preston, 1916: synonym of Gyraulus biwaensis (Preston, 1916)
- Planorbis borealis Westerlund, 1875: synonym of Gyraulus borealis (Lovén in Westerlund, 1875)
- Planorbis campanulatus Say, 1821 accepted as Planorbella campanulata (Say, 1821)
- Planorbis chinensis Dunker, 1848: synonym of Gyraulus chinensis (Dunker, 1848)
- Planorbis contrarius O. F. Müller, 1774: synonym of Marisa cornuarietis (Linnaeus, 1758)
- Planorbis convexiusculus Hutton, 1849: synonym of Gyraulus convexiusculus (Hutton, 1849)
- Planorbis corinna Gray, 1850 accepted as Gyraulus corinna
- Planorbis costulatus Krauss, 1848: synonym of Gyraulus costulatus (Krauss, 1848)
- Planorbis crosseanus Bourguignat, 1862: synonym of Gyraulus albus (O. F. Müller, 1774)
- Planorbis ehrenbergi Beck, 1837: synonym of Gyraulus ehrenbergi (Beck, 1837)
- Planorbis essingtonensis E. A. Smith, 1882: synonym of Gyraulus essingtonensis (E. A. Smith, 1882)
- Planorbis fragilis Tate, 1896: synonym of Gyraulus essingtonensis (E. A. Smith, 1882)
- Planorbis gredleri Gredler, 1859: synonym of Gyraulus acronicus (Férussac, 1807)
- Planorbis hebraicus Bourguignat, 1852: synonym of Gyraulus hebraicus (Bourguignat, 1852)
- Planorbis hispidus Draparnaud, 1805: synonym of Gyraulus albus (O. F. Müller, 1774)
- Planorbis imbricatus O. F. Müller, 1774: synonym of Gyraulus crista (Linnaeus, 1758) represented as Gyraulus (Armiger) crista (Linnaeus, 1758)
- Planorbis kahuica Finlay & Laws, 1931 accepted as Gyraulus kahuica (Finlay & Laws, 1931)
- Planorbis laevis Alder, 1838: synonym of Gyraulus laevis (Alder, 1838)
- Planorbis leucostoma Millet, 1813: synonym of Anisus (Anisus) leucostoma (Millet, 1813)
- Planorbis natalensis Krauss, 1848: synonym of Afrogyrorbis natalensis (Krauss, 1848)
- Planorbis paladilhi Moitessier, 1867: synonym of Gyraulus crista (Linnaeus, 1758) represented as Gyraulus (Armiger) crista (Linnaeus, 1758)
- Planorbis parvus Say, 1817: synonym of Gyraulus parvus (Say, 1817)
- Planorbis persicus Ancey, 1900: synonym of Planorbis intermixtus Mousson, 1874
- Planorbis piscinarum Bourguignat, 1852: synonym of Gyraulus piscinarum (Bourguignat, 1852)
- Planorbis riparius Westerlund, 1865: synonym of Gyraulus riparius (Westerlund, 1865)
- Planorbis rossmaessleri Auerswald, 1851: synonym of Gyraulus rossmaessleri (Auerswald, 1851)
- Planorbis rotula Benson, 1850: synonym of Gyraulus rotula (Benson, 1850)
- Planorbis sivalensis Clessin, 1884: synonym of Gyraulus sivalensis (Clessin, 1884)
- Planorbis spirillus Gould, 1859: synonym of Gyraulus spirillus (Gould, 1859)
- Planorbis spirorbis (Linnaeus, 1758): synonym of Anisus (Anisus) spirorbis (Linnaeus, 1758)
- Planorbis thermalis Westerlund, 1885: synonym of Gyraulus laevis (Alder, 1838)
- Planorbis umbilicatus (Müller, 1773): synonym of Planorbis (Planorbis) planorbis (Linnaeus, 1758)
- Planorbis waterhousei Clessin, 1885: synonym of Gyraulus waterhousei (Clessin, 1885)
