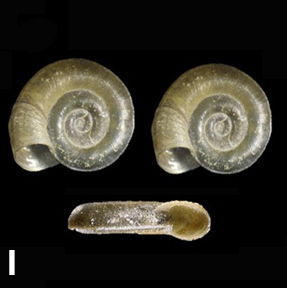

Scientific classification
- Kingdom: Animalia
- Phylum: Mollusca
- Class: Gastropoda
- Superorder: Hygrophila
- Family: Planorbidae
- Genus: Planorbis
- Species: P. intermixtus

Binomial name
- Planorbis intermixtus Mousson, 1874

Synonyms
- List: Afroplanorbis intermixtus (Mousson, 1874); superseded combination; Gyraulus intermixtus (Mousson, 1874); superseded combination; Planorbis (Gyraulus) intermixtus Mousson, 1874; superseded combination; Planorbis (Planorbis) intermixtus Mousson, 1874; alternative representation; Planorbis persicus Ancey, 1900; junior subjective synonym

= Planorbis intermixtus =

Planorbis intermixtus Temporal range: Upper Holocene–Present

Species of gastropod

Planorbis intermixtus is an extant species of freshwater gastropod belonging to the family Planorbidae. It can be found across much of Southeastern Europe and West Asia. It has a fossil record dating back to the early Holocene. It can be an intermediate host to trematode and roundworm parasites.

== Taxonomy ==
Planorbis intermixtus was first described as Planorbis (Gyraulus) intermixtus in 1874 by Albert Mousson. It was described again in 1900 as Planorbis persicus by C. F. Ancey. It was moved from the subgenus Gyraulus to the subgenus Planorbis in 1976, where it remains today. It may be alternatively referred to as Planorbis (Planorbis) intermixtus.

This species may be a distant ring species of Planorbis planorbis. It is likely closely related to Planorbis atticus.

== Description ==
Planorbis intermixtus shares several characteristics in common with other Planorbis species, and therefore cannot be distinguished by the shell alone.

=== Shell ===
The shell of Planorbis intermixtus is similar to those of Planorbis planorbis and Planorbis atticus. As an adult, the shell of P. intermixtus measures between 6 and 7 mm (0.24 and 0.28 in) in width on average, and about 1.8 mm (0.071 in) in height. Under the right conditions, however, this species may grow up to 11.5 mm (0.45 in) in width. There are between 4 and 5 body whorls. The aperture is weakly or moderately angled (distinct from the strongly angled shell of Planorbis philippii). The final whorl may be rounded or keeled near the suture.

=== Sexual characteristics ===
Many sexual characteristics of Planorbis intermixtus are distinct from P. planorbis and P. atticus, but may overlap with those of Planorbis carinatus and Planorbis presbensis. The number of prostate diverticules range from 20 to 36, with an average of about 30 (± 2.8 for 1 standard deviation). The number of diverticules increases with more western populations. The preputium is pigmented, unlike the penis sheath. The penis sheath is relatively long (about 1.8 mm), is about the same length as the penis, is 75% of the length of the preputium, and is between 25 and 33% of the length of the vas deferens. The seminal vesicles have spiny projections. The bursa copulatrix is highly variable in shape. It may resemble a tadpole with a large bursa and skinny duct, elongated with a poorly defined bursa, or have intermediate characteristics. Most specimens have more elongate forms.

=== Other characteristics ===
The head and foot of Planorbis intermixtus are light grey or black in color, with the mantle being dark grey or black. It is diploid, with 18 pairs of (36 total) chromosomes. The radula of P. intermixtus is indistinguishable from P. planorbis.

== Distribution ==
Planorbis intermixtus may be found across various Greek islands, Turkey, western Iran, Iraq, Georgia, and even as far as Issyk-Kul in Kyrgyzstan. In Iran, specific occurrences have been found in seven provinces, including Mazandaran, Markazi, and Fars. Additionally, prior instances of Planorbis planorbis in the country are thought to be misidentified, and are actually P. intermixtus. In Iraq, the species has been found near the Euphrates River in Samawah. There are also reports of its range extending to northern India.

== Habitat and ecology ==
Planorbis intermixtus may be found alongside other mollusk species, including Physella acuta, Pseudobithynia zagrosia, Pisidium casertanum, and Radix persica. It inhabits a similar variety of habitats as other planorbids, from small streams to rivers, and from temporary ponds to lakes. It inhabits primarily rocky environments, sometimes with aquatic vegetation. It may be found at depths of up to 70 cm (2.3 ft), though usually it stays shallower at around 33 cm (1.08 ft) on average.

P. intermixtus can be an intermediate host for trematode parasites. A Turkish study from 2020 found that of the 1,650 individuals collected, 20% were infected. This species is also highly susceptible to infection with the nematode parasite Angiostrongylus cantonensis, where it again acts as an intermediate host. It may share the same habitat as the commensal polychaete Chaetogaster limnaei limnaei, but does not harbor them. The larvae of flies in the genus Colobaea are known to predate upon this snail, then use the empty shell to pupate.

== Fossil record ==
Several fossils of this species have been discovered from the uppermost deposits in the Hammar Formation in Iraq (ancient Mesopotamia). These deposits date back to the early Holocene. At this point in time, this area was likely a freshwater lake or swamp, and may have been connected to the estuary formed by the Euphrates and Tigris rivers. Some fossils of Planorbis intermixtus are attached to fossilized aquatic plants.
