= Planorbis presbensis =

Conservation status
- Vulnerable (IUCN 3.1)

Scientific classification
- Kingdom: Animalia
- Phylum: Mollusca
- Class: Gastropoda
- Superorder: Hygrophila
- Family: Planorbidae
- Genus: Planorbis
- Species: P. presbensis

Binomial name
- Planorbis presbensis Sturany, 1894
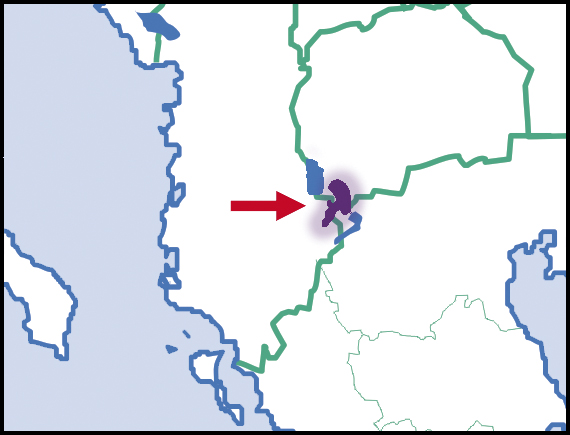
- Geographic range of Planorbis presbensis

Synonyms
- Planorbis (Crassiplanorbis) presbensis Sturany, 1894; alternative representation

Species of gastropod

Planorbis presbensis is a species of planorbid snail endemic to Lake Prespa. Since 2010, it has been considered vulnerable by the IUCN.

== Taxonomy ==
Planorbis presbensis was described from Lake Prespa by Rudolf Sturany in 1894. At some point, it may have been placed in the genus Gyraulus, and was redescribed in 1976 as Planorbis (Crassiplanorbis) presbensis. It is the type species of the subgenus Crassiplanorbis. It may be closely related to Planorbis macedonicus.

== Description ==
The shell of Planorbis presbensis measures between 7–9 mm (0.28–0.35 in) in length and 4–5 mm (0.16–0.20 in) in height. The walls of the shell are relatively thick compared to other species of Planorbis. Each successive body whorl from the umbilicus is wider than the last, and forms so the shell is concave on one side and convex on the other. The final whorl may diverge out of line with the other whorls. The aperture is between 4–5 mm (0.16–0.20 in) across, is oval-shaped, and has a round lip.

P. presbensis has between 24–32 prostate diverticules. Most other reproductive features are indistinguishable from other Planorbis species, namely Planorbis intermixtus. The penis can be corkscrew-shaped or straight, and is 1.8 mm in length on average.

== Distribution, habitat, and ecology ==
Planorbis presbensis is endemic to both lakes in the Lake Prespa system. This includes specific occurrences from Albania and Greece. It stays close to the shore at a maximum depth of about 1 m (3.3 ft). Most of its diet consists of diatoms that grow on the rocks it lives on.

== Conservation status ==
Planorbis presbensis has been considered vulnerable by the IUCN since 2010. Although it is still common in the lakes, it faces a number of threats that put it at risk of future extinction. These threats include invasive fish species, eutrophication, and pollution from agricultural and residential effluents. Herbicides are also harmful given that they change the quantity of the algae that they eat.
