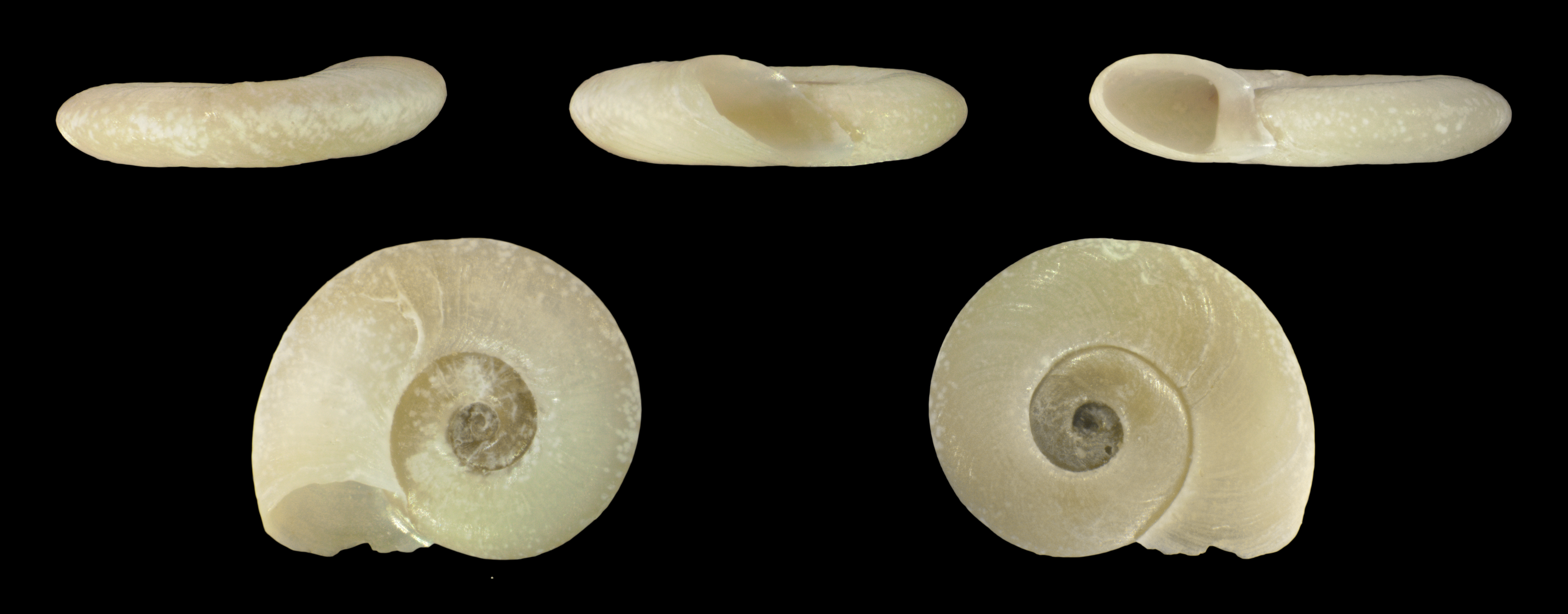

Conservation status
- Endangered (IUCN 3.1)

Scientific classification
- Kingdom: Animalia
- Phylum: Mollusca
- Class: Gastropoda
- Superorder: Hygrophila
- Family: Planorbidae
- Genus: Planorbis
- Species: P. macedonicus

Binomial name
- Planorbis macedonicus Sturany, 1894
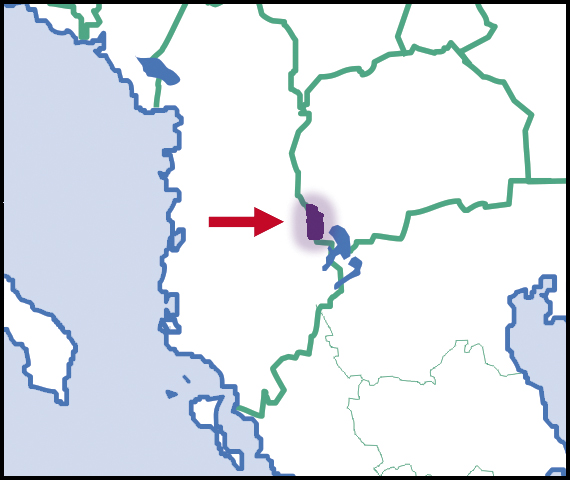

Synonyms
- Planorbis (Gyrorbis) macedonicus Sturany, 1894; Planorbis (Planorbis) macedonicus (Sturany, 1894)

= Planorbis macedonicus =

Species of gastropod

Planorbis macedonicus is a small species of planorbid snail endemic to North Macedonia. Since 2010, this species has been considered endangered.

== Taxonomy ==
Planorbis macedonicus was described from Lake Ohrid in 1894 by Rudolf Sturany. It may be closely related to Planorbis presbensis.

== Description ==
The shell of Planorbis macedonicus is between 6.5–8.6 mm in diameter and 2.3–2.6 mm in length. The aperture is between 3–3.2 mm. There are around 4.5 whorls in total. It is brown in coloration, and the final whorl may curve out of line with the others.

P. macedonicus has between 29–32 prostate diverticules.

== Distribution and habitat ==
Planorbis macedonicus is endemic to southeastern Lake Ohrid and surrounding springs. It can be found at depths of between 0–5 m (0–16 ft). It is only found in rockier areas.

== Conservation status ==
In November 2009, Planorbis macedonicus was reviewed by the IUCN and the species was determined to be endangered. Because P. macedonicus is only known from Lake Ohrid, wastewater and agricultural effluents in the lake threaten the entire species. Once described as being abundant, the species is now only found in low numbers.
