= Nassarius thaumasius =

Scientific classification
- Kingdom: Animalia
- Phylum: Mollusca
- Class: Gastropoda
- Subclass: Caenogastropoda
- Order: Neogastropoda
- Family: Nassariidae
- Genus: Nassarius
- Species: N. thaumasius

Binomial name
- Nassarius thaumasius (Sturany, 1900)

Synonyms
- Nassa steindachneri Sturany, 1900; Nassa thaumasia Sturany, 1900 (original combination); Nassa thaumasia f. nana Sturany, 1900; Nassa xesta Sturany, 1900

Species of gastropod

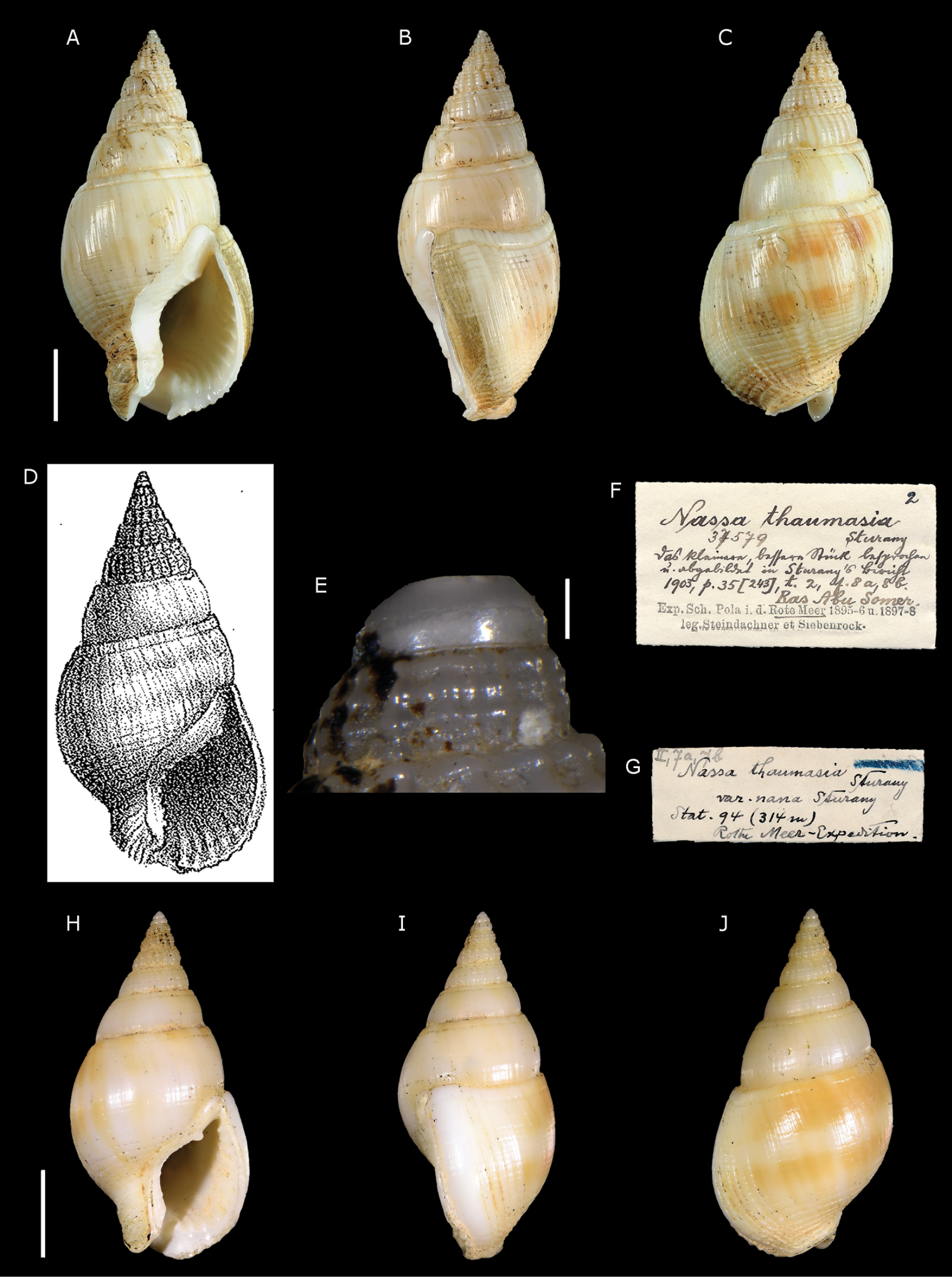

Nassarius thaumasius is a species of sea snail, a marine gastropod mollusk in the family Nassariidae, the nassa mud snails or dog whelks.

== Distribution ==
This species occurs in the Red Sea.
