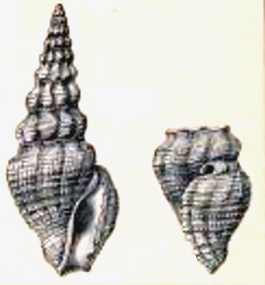
- Original image of a shell of Drillia levanderi

Scientific classification
- Kingdom: Animalia
- Phylum: Mollusca
- Class: Gastropoda
- Subclass: Caenogastropoda
- Order: Neogastropoda
- Superfamily: Conoidea
- Family: Drilliidae
- Genus: Drillia
- Species: D. levanderi

Binomial name
- Drillia levanderi Sturany, 1905

= Drillia levanderi =

Species of gastropod

Drillia levanderi is a species of sea snail, a marine gastropod mollusk in the family Drilliidae.

== Description ==
The length of the shell attains 19.5 mm, its diameter 7.2 mm.

(Original description in German) The shell, which is 19.5 mm high and 7.2 mm wide, is distinguished by an aperture that is 5 mm high. The shell consists of 11 whorls. The first 2 1/2 to 3 whorls are smooth, followed by strong transverse ridges, to which gradually increasing spiral ridges are added. The last and second-to-last whorl bears 8 transverse ridges, while the upper whorls have 7 transverse ridges. On the body whorl, these ridges barely reach halfway, leaving the dark violet-colored base of the shell free. However, just before the aperture, there is a prominent ridge that extends from the upper notch to the basal area. The dark color of the shell's base is due to a broad band that can be traced into the upper whorls, where it is integrated into the seam but appears as interconnected spots. Among the spiral ridges, the uppermost one, which runs through the slightly lower whorl section, is particularly marked by yellow spots, but the underlying ridges also show such spots here and there, especially on the body whorl. Here, the ridges adorned with a pearl-like pattern, which are closest to the end of the shell, stand out beautifully against the dark background. The edge of the aperture is jagged, strongly notched at the top, and bent back at the bottom; the wall of the aperture features a strong thickening opposite the notch, and the interior of the aperture is pink in color.

== Distribution ==
This marine species occurs off Eritrea.
