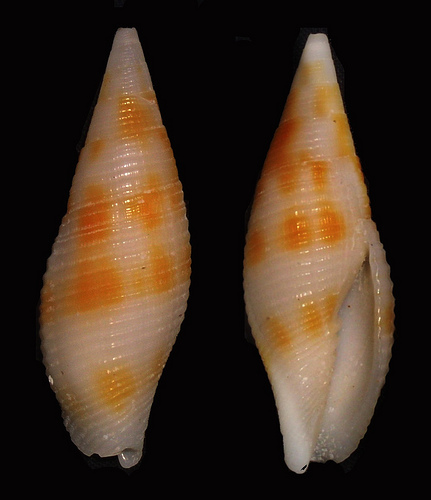

Scientific classification
- Kingdom: Animalia
- Phylum: Mollusca
- Class: Gastropoda
- Subclass: Caenogastropoda
- Order: Neogastropoda
- Family: Mitridae
- Genus: Gemmulimitra
- Species: G. rubiginosa

Binomial name
- Gemmulimitra rubiginosa Reeve, 1844

Synonyms
- Mitra (Nebularia) rubiginosa Reeve, 1844

= Gemmulimitra rubiginosa =

Species of gastropod

Gemmulimitra rubiginosa is a species of sea snail, a marine gastropod mollusk in the family Mitridae, the miters or miter snails.

== Description ==
The shell size varies between 24 mm and 50 mm.

== Distribution ==
This species is distributed in the Eastern Indian Ocean, the Pacific Ocean along Papua New Guinea, Fiji, and the Philippines.
