= Gyraulus argaeicus =

Conservation status
- Vulnerable (IUCN 3.1)

Scientific classification
- Kingdom: Animalia
- Phylum: Mollusca
- Class: Gastropoda
- Superorder: Hygrophila
- Family: Planorbidae
- Genus: Gyraulus
- Species: G. argaeicus

Binomial name
- Gyraulus argaeicus (Sturany, 1904)

Species of gastropod

Gyraulus argaeicus is a species of small freshwater snail, an aquatic pulmonate gastropod mollusk in the family Planorbidae, the ram's horn snails.
