= Gyraulus circumstriatus =

Conservation status
- Least Concern (IUCN 3.1)

- Secure (NatureServe)

Scientific classification
- Kingdom: Animalia
- Phylum: Mollusca
- Class: Gastropoda
- Superorder: Hygrophila
- Family: Planorbidae
- Genus: Gyraulus
- Species: G. circumstriatus

Binomial name
- Gyraulus circumstriatus (Tryon, 1866)

Synonyms
- Planorbis (Gyraulus) circumstriatus Tryon, 1866; Planorbis parvus var. urbanensis Baker, 1919 †

Species of freshwater snail native to North America

Gyraulus circumstriatus, commonly known as the disk gyro, is a species of freshwater snail in the family Planorbidae. It is native to North America.
