= Gyraulus cockburni =

Conservation status
- Endangered (IUCN 3.1)

Scientific classification
- Kingdom: Animalia
- Phylum: Mollusca
- Class: Gastropoda
- Superorder: Hygrophila
- Family: Planorbidae
- Genus: Gyraulus
- Species: G. cockburni

Binomial name
- Gyraulus cockburni (Godwin-Austen, 1883)

Species of gastropod

Gyraulus cockburni is a species of small, mostly air-breathing, freshwater snail, aquatic pulmonate gastropod mollusk in the family Planorbidae, the ram's horn snails.

This species is endemic to Socotra, Yemen.
