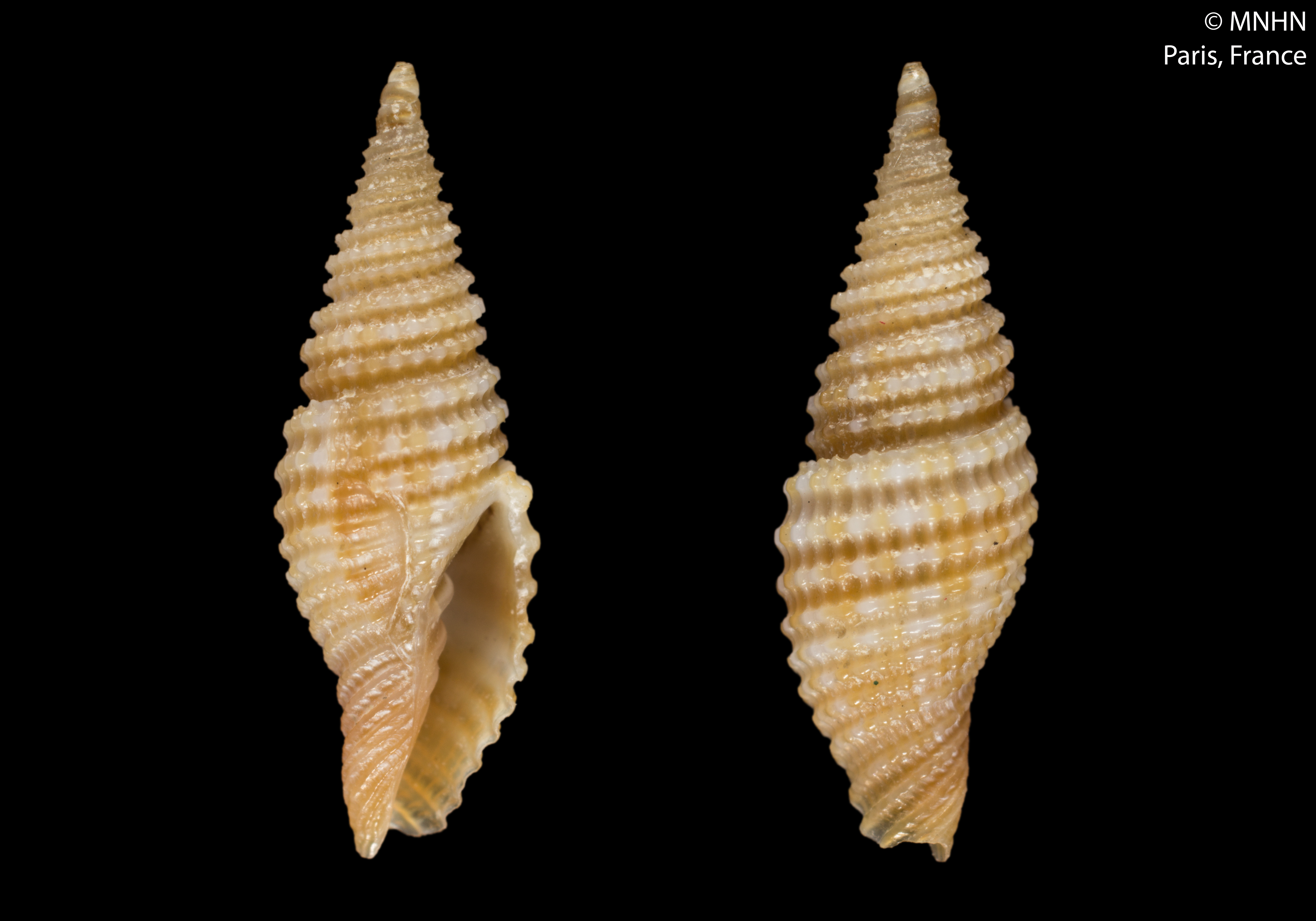

Scientific classification
- Kingdom: Animalia
- Phylum: Mollusca
- Class: Gastropoda
- Subclass: Caenogastropoda
- Order: Neogastropoda
- Family: Mitridae
- Genus: Gemmulimitra
- Species: G. hansturneri

Binomial name
- Gemmulimitra hansturneri (Guillot de Suduiraut, 2009)

Synonyms
- Mitra hansturneri Guillot de Suduiraut, 2009

= Gemmulimitra hansturneri =

Species of gastropod

Gemmulimitra hansturneri is a species of sea snail, a marine gastropod mollusk in the family Mitridae, the miters or miter snails.

== Description ==
The length of the shell attains 11.65 mm.

== Distribution ==
This marine species occurs off Mactan Island, the Philippines.
