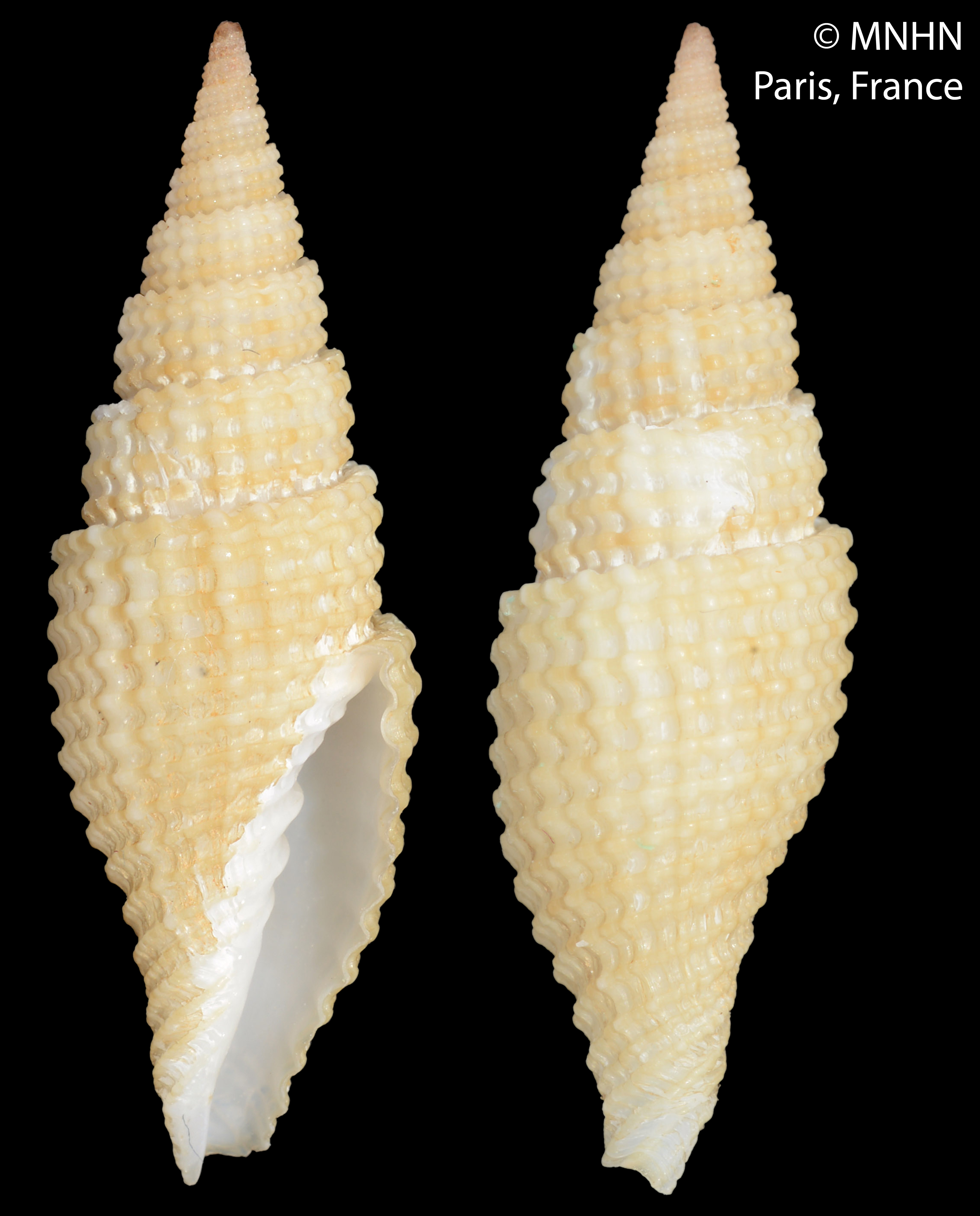
- Shell of Gemmulimitra neocaledonica (holotype at MNHN, Paris)

Scientific classification
- Kingdom: Animalia
- Phylum: Mollusca
- Class: Gastropoda
- Subclass: Caenogastropoda
- Order: Neogastropoda
- Superfamily: Mitroidea
- Family: Mitridae
- Subfamily: Mitrinae
- Genus: Gemmulimitra; Fedosov, Herrmann, Kantor & Bouchet, 2018

Type species
- Gemmulimitra neocaledonica Fedosov, Herrmann, Kantor & Bouchet, 2018

Species
- See text

= Gemmulimitra =

Genus of gastropods

Gemmulimitra is a genus of sea snails, marine gastropod mollusks in the family Mitridae.

== Species ==
Species within the genus Gemmulimitra include:

- Gemmulimitra aliciae (Poppe, Tagaro & R. Salisbury, 2009)
- Gemmulimitra apprimapex (Poppe, Tagaro & R. Salisbury, 2009)
- Gemmulimitra avenacea (Reeve, 1845)
- Gemmulimitra boucheti (Cernohorsky, 1988)
- Gemmulimitra duplilirata (Reeve, 1845)
- Gemmulimitra edgari (Poppe, Tagaro & R. Salisbury, 2009)
- Gemmulimitra gemma S.-I Huang & Q.-Y. Chuo, 2019
- Gemmulimitra gonatophora (Sturany, 1903)
- Gemmulimitra hansturneri (E. Guillot de Suduiraut & E. G. Guillot de Suduiraut, 2009)
- Gemmulimitra margaritata (Poppe, Tagaro & R. Salisbury, 2009)
- Gemmulimitra neocaledonica Fedosov, Herrmann, Kantor & Bouchet, 2018
- Gemmulimitra picardali S.-I Huang & Q.-Y. Chuo, 2019
- Gemmulimitra rubiginosa (Reeve, 1844)
- Gemmulimitra solanderi (Reeve, 1844)
- Gemmulimitra strongae (Poppe, Tagaro & R. Salisbury, 2009)
