= Gemmulimitra solanderi =

Scientific classification
- Kingdom: Animalia
- Phylum: Mollusca
- Class: Gastropoda
- Subclass: Caenogastropoda
- Order: Neogastropoda
- Family: Mitridae
- Genus: Gemmulimitra
- Species: G. solanderi

Binomial name
- Gemmulimitra solanderi (Reeve, 1844)

Synonyms
- Mitra solanderi Reeve, 1844

Species of gastropod

Gemmulimitra solanderi is a species of sea snail, a marine gastropod mollusk in the family Mitridae, the miters or miter snails.
