= Gemmulimitra apprimapex =

Scientific classification
- Kingdom: Animalia
- Phylum: Mollusca
- Class: Gastropoda
- Subclass: Caenogastropoda
- Order: Neogastropoda
- Family: Mitridae
- Genus: Gemmulimitra
- Species: G. apprimapex

Binomial name
- Gemmulimitra apprimapex (Poppe, Tagaro & Salisbury, 2009)

Synonyms
- Cancilla apprimapex Poppe, Tagaro & Salisbury, 2009

Species of gastropod

Gemmulimitra apprimapex is a species of sea snail, a marine gastropod mollusc in the family Mitridae, the miters or miter snails.

== Description ==
Shell size 35-40 mm.

== Distribution ==
Indo-Pacific region.
