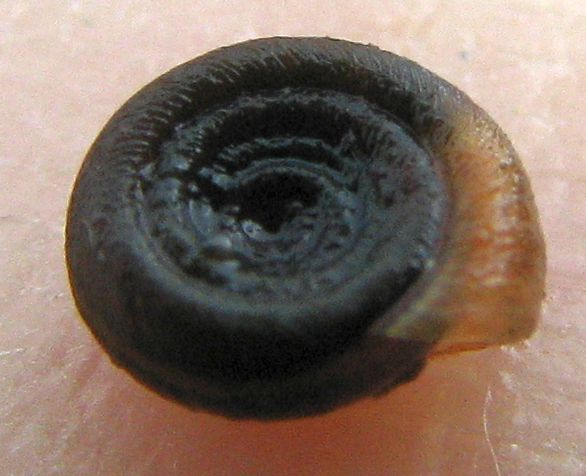

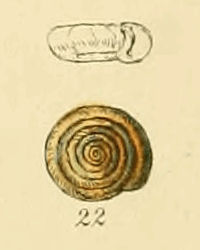

Conservation status
- Least Concern (IUCN 3.1)

Scientific classification
- Kingdom: Animalia
- Phylum: Mollusca
- Class: Gastropoda
- Superorder: Hygrophila
- Family: Planorbidae
- Genus: Bathyomphalus
- Species: B. contortus

Binomial name
- Bathyomphalus contortus (Linnaeus, 1758)

= Bathyomphalus contortus =

Species of gastropod

Bathyomphalus contortus is a species of small air-breathing freshwater snail, an aquatic pulmonate gastropod mollusk in the family Planorbidae, the Ramshorn snails and their allies.

== Distribution ==
The distribution of this species is Palearctic:Eurasian Wide-temperate.

It occurs in countries and islands including:

- Great Britain
- Czech Republic - least concern (LC)
- Germany
- Netherlands
- Poland
- Slovakia

== Description ==
The 1-2 × 3-6 mm shell has up to 7-8 densely coiled and rounded whorls with deep suture. The whorls are higher than wide, the lower side is almost flat, the upper side with a large umbilicus which is more than 1/3 of the shell diameter. The aperture is narrow. Shell colour is reddish horny brown, often with black or brown encrustations, finely striated. The animal is blackish dark red, tentacles very long, eyes small and black.

== Habitat ==
This small snail lives in freshwater habitats especially small, impoverished water-bodies and drains and marshy or peaty pools. It is also found in floodplain marshes. It seldom occurs in larger water-bodies. Bathyomphalus contortus is tolerant of acidic conditions as is Ampullaceana balthica. In Ireland it is often the only species present in pools or drains in and around raised bogs.
