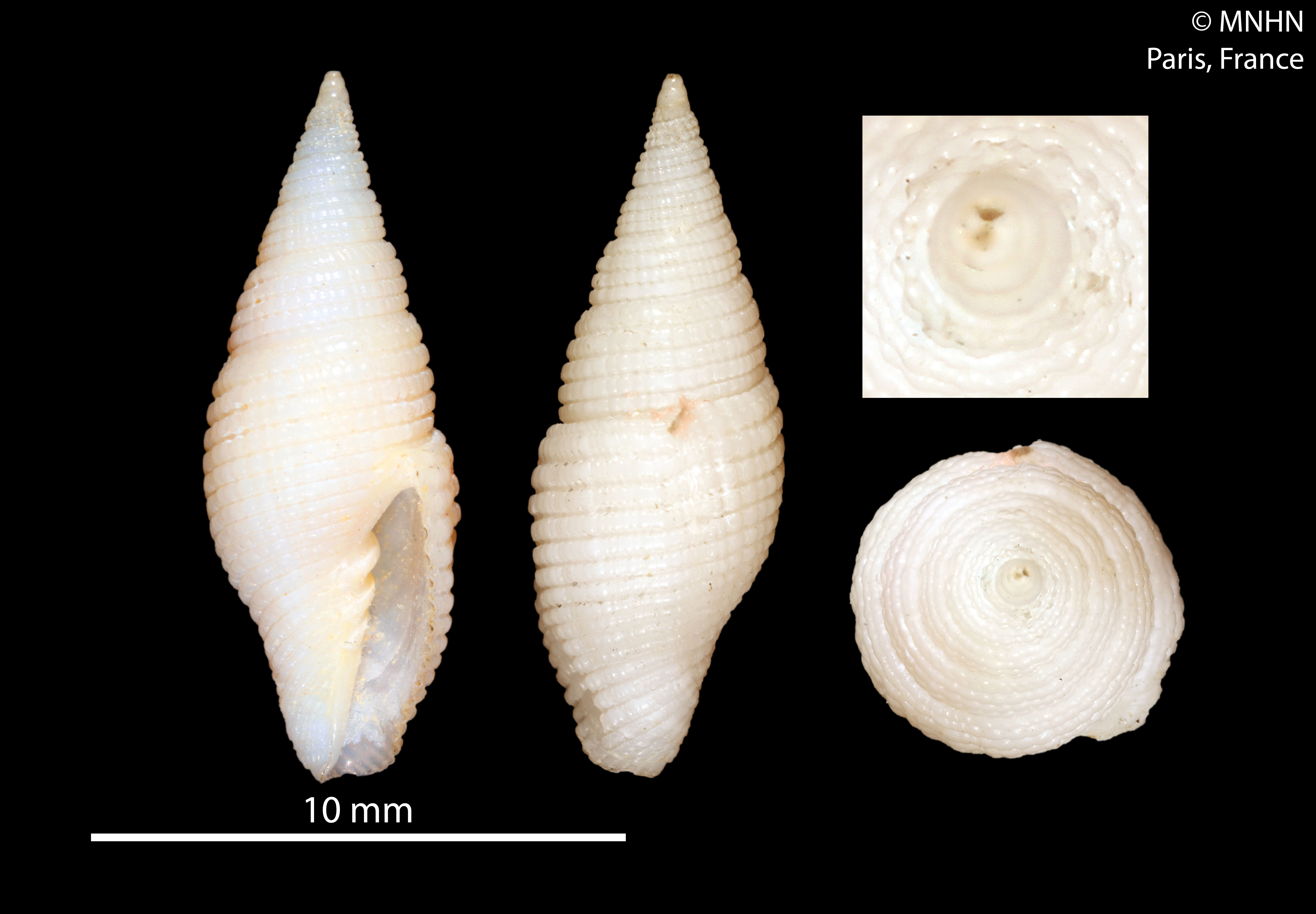
- Shell of Gemmulimitra aliciae (paratype at MNHN, Paris)

Scientific classification
- Kingdom: Animalia
- Phylum: Mollusca
- Class: Gastropoda
- Subclass: Caenogastropoda
- Order: Neogastropoda
- Family: Mitridae
- Genus: Gemmulimitra
- Species: G. aliciae

Binomial name
- Gemmulimitra aliciae (Poppe, Tagaro & Salisbury, 2009)

Synonyms
- Mitra aliciae Poppe, Tagaro & Salisbury, 2009; Neocancilla aliciae (Poppe, Tagaro & R. Salisbury, 2009)

= Gemmulimitra aliciae =

Species of gastropod

Gemmulimitra aliciae is a species of sea snail, a marine gastropod mollusk in the family Mitridae, the miters or miter snails.

== Distribution ==
This marine species occurs off the Philippines.
