= Gyraulus pamphylicus =

Conservation status
- Vulnerable (IUCN 3.1)

Scientific classification
- Domain: Eukaryota
- Kingdom: Animalia
- Phylum: Mollusca
- Class: Gastropoda
- Superorder: Hygrophila
- Family: Planorbidae
- Genus: Gyraulus
- Species: G. pamphylicus

Binomial name
- Gyraulus pamphylicus (Glöer, & Rähle, 2009)

Species of gastropod

Gyraulus pamphylicus is a species of small, mostly air-breathing, freshwater snail, aquatic pulmonate gastropod mollusc in the family Planorbidae, the ram's horn snails. The species is endemic to Taurus Mountains in Turkey.
