= Gyraulus deflectus =

Conservation status
- Least Concern (IUCN 3.1)

- Secure (NatureServe)

Scientific classification
- Kingdom: Animalia
- Phylum: Mollusca
- Class: Gastropoda
- Superorder: Hygrophila
- Family: Planorbidae
- Genus: Gyraulus
- Species: G. deflectus

Binomial name
- Gyraulus deflectus (Say, 1824)

Synonyms
- Gyraulus hirsutus (Gould, 1840); Gyraulus latistomus Baker, 1932; Planorbis altissimus Baker, 1919; Planorbis deflectus Say, 1824; Planorbis hirsutus Gould, 1840; Planorbis obliquus De Kay, 1843

Species of freshwater snail native to North America

Gyraulus deflectus, commonly known as the flexed gyro, is a species of freshwater snail in the family Planorbidae. It is native to North America.
