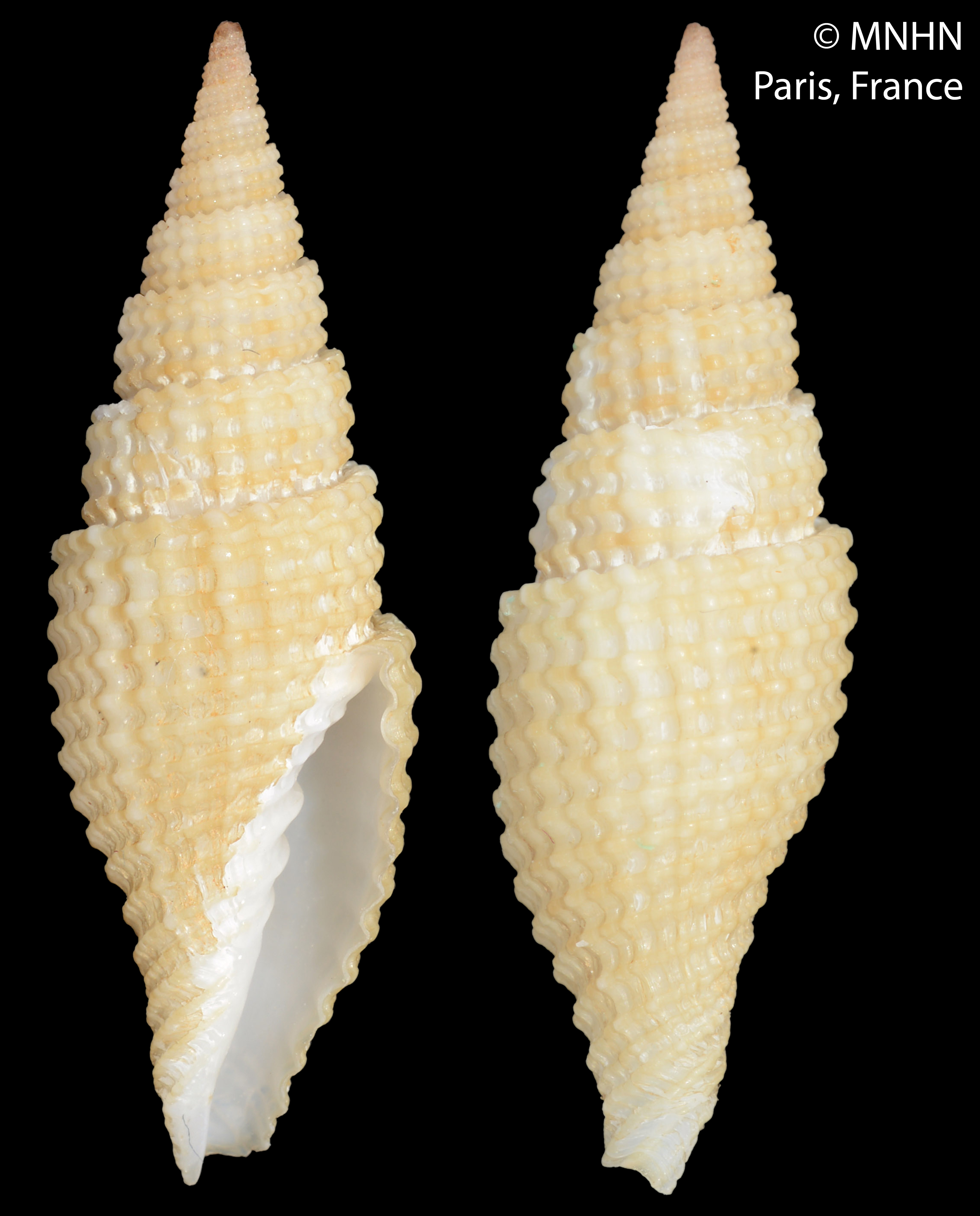
- Shell of Gemmulimitra neocaledonica (holotype at MNHN, Paris)

Scientific classification
- Kingdom: Animalia
- Phylum: Mollusca
- Class: Gastropoda
- Subclass: Caenogastropoda
- Order: Neogastropoda
- Superfamily: Mitroidea
- Family: Mitridae
- Subfamily: Mitrinae
- Genus: Gemmulimitra
- Species: G. neocaledonica

Binomial name
- Gemmulimitra neocaledonica Fedosov, Herrmann, Kantor & Bouchet, 2018

= Gemmulimitra neocaledonica =

Species of gastropod

Gemmulimitra neocaledonica is a species of sea snail, a marine gastropod mollusk, in the family Mitridae, the miters or miter snails.

== Distribution ==
This marine species occurs off New Caledonia.
