= Gyraulus nedyalkovi =

Conservation status
- Vulnerable (IUCN 3.1)

Scientific classification
- Domain: Eukaryota
- Kingdom: Animalia
- Phylum: Mollusca
- Class: Gastropoda
- Superorder: Hygrophila
- Family: Planorbidae
- Genus: Gyraulus
- Species: G. nedyalkovi

Binomial name
- Gyraulus nedyalkovi (Glöer & Georgiev, 2012)

Species of gastropod

Gyraulus nedyalkovi is a species of small, mostly air-breathing, freshwater snail. It is an aquatic pulmonate gastropod mollusc in the family Planorbidae, namely the ram's horn snails. The species is endemic to Turkey.
