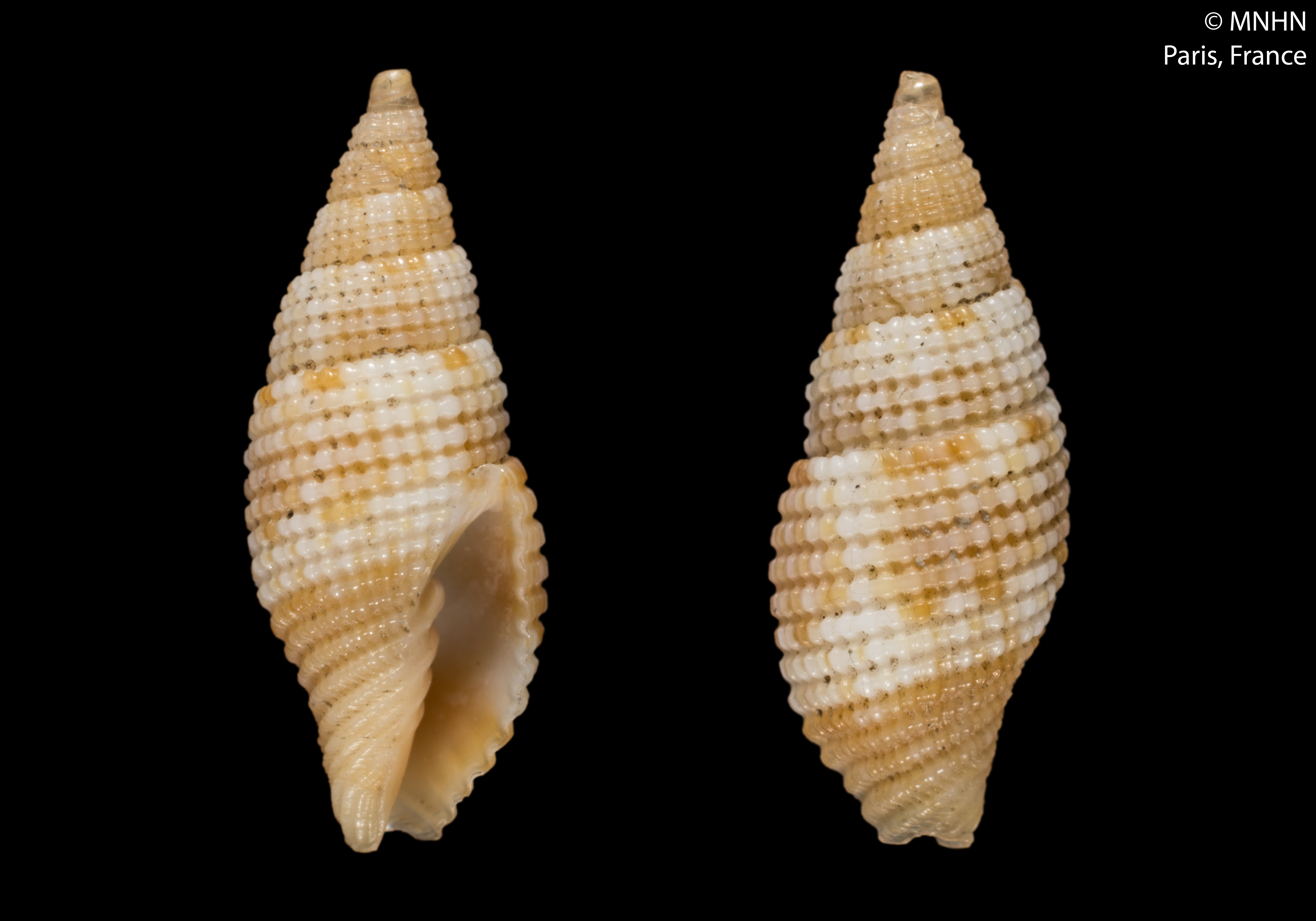
- Shell of Gemmulimitra boucheti (holotype at MNHN, Paris)

Scientific classification
- Kingdom: Animalia
- Phylum: Mollusca
- Class: Gastropoda
- Subclass: Caenogastropoda
- Order: Neogastropoda
- Superfamily: Mitroidea
- Family: Mitridae
- Subfamily: Mitrinae
- Genus: Gemmulimitra
- Species: G. boucheti

Binomial name
- Gemmulimitra boucheti (Cernohorsky, 1988)

Synonyms
- Mitra (Nebularia) boucheti Cernohorsky, 1988; Mitra boucheti Cernohorsky, 1988

= Gemmulimitra boucheti =

Species of gastropod

Gemmulimitra boucheti is a species of sea snail, a marine gastropod mollusk, in the family Mitridae, the miters or miter snails.

== Description ==
The length of the shell attains 9 mm.

== Distribution ==
This marine species occurs in the Indian Ocean off Réunion.
