= Gemmulimitra edgari =

Scientific classification
- Kingdom: Animalia
- Phylum: Mollusca
- Class: Gastropoda
- Subclass: Caenogastropoda
- Order: Neogastropoda
- Family: Mitridae
- Genus: Gemmulimitra
- Species: G. edgari

Binomial name
- Gemmulimitra edgari (Poppe, Tagaro & Salisbury, 2009)

Synonyms
- Mitra edgari Poppe, Tagaro & Salisbury, 2009

Species of gastropod

Gemmulimitra edgari is a species of sea snail, a marine gastropod mollusk in the family Mitridae, the miters or miter snails.
