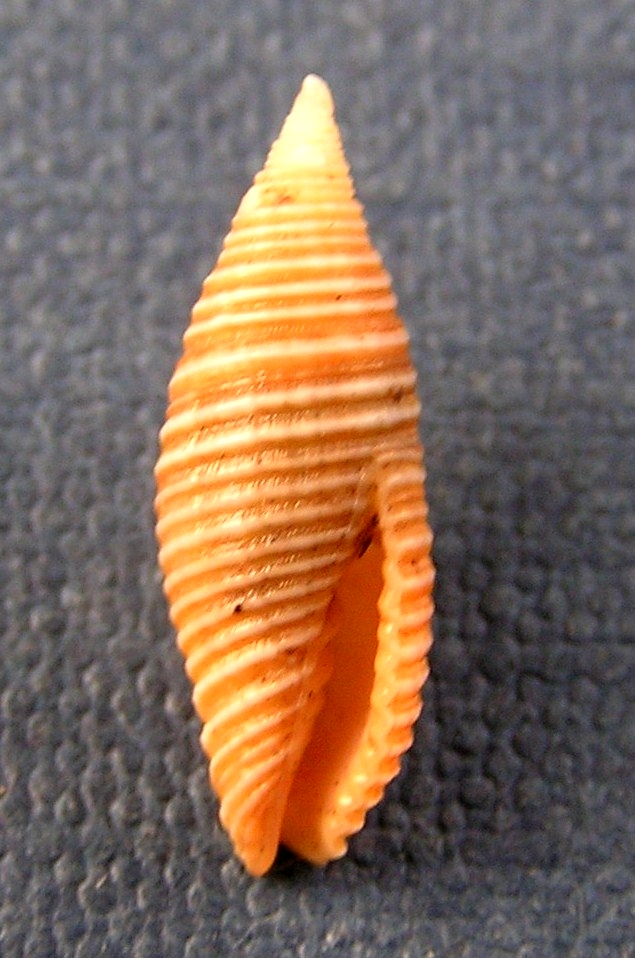

Scientific classification
- Kingdom: Animalia
- Phylum: Mollusca
- Class: Gastropoda
- Subclass: Caenogastropoda
- Order: Neogastropoda
- Family: Mitridae
- Genus: Gemmulimitra
- Species: G. avenacea

Binomial name
- Gemmulimitra avenacea (Reeve, 1845)

Synonyms
- Mitra avenacea Reeve, 1845; Mitra hanleyi Sowerby, 1874; Mitra (Nebularia) indentata Orbigny, A.V.M.D. d', 1841; Mitra indentata Sowerby, 1874

= Gemmulimitra avenacea =

Species of gastropod

Gemmulimitra avenacea is a species of sea snail, a marine gastropod mollusk in the family Mitridae, the miters or miter snails.

== Description ==
The shell size varies between 12 mm and 32 mm.

== Distribution ==
This species is distributed in the Indian Ocean along the Mascarene Basin and in the Pacific Ocean along the Philippines, Indonesia, Fiji, Papua New Guinea.

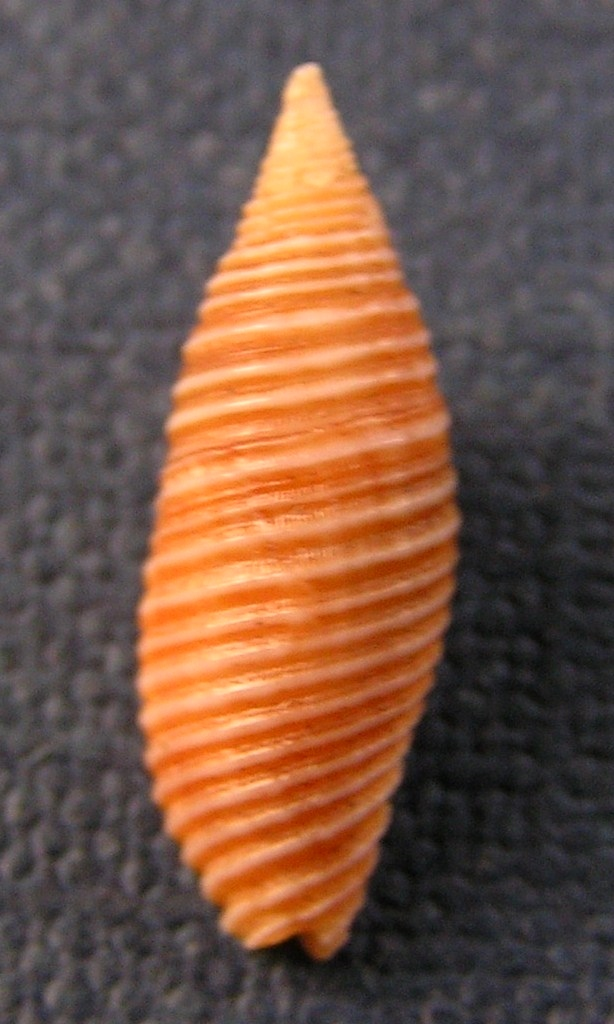
'Mitra (Nebularia) avenacea', abapertural view
