= Gyraulus bekaensis =

Conservation status
- Vulnerable (IUCN 3.1)

Scientific classification
- Kingdom: Animalia
- Phylum: Mollusca
- Class: Gastropoda
- Superorder: Hygrophila
- Family: Planorbidae
- Genus: Gyraulus
- Species: G. bekaensis

Binomial name
- Gyraulus bekaensis Glöer & Bössneck, 2007

Species of gastropod

Gyraulus bekaensis is a species of freshwater snail, an aquatic pulmonate gastropod mollusc in the family Planorbidae, the ram's horn snails. It is endemic to Lebabon.

The specific name bekaensis is named after the Beqaa Governorate, where it occurs.

== Distribution ==
The type locality is Aammiq, Beqaa Governorate, Lebanon. It is not known from anywhere else.

== Habitat ==
Gyraulus bekaensis is a palustrine species that occurs in the Aammiq Wetland.
