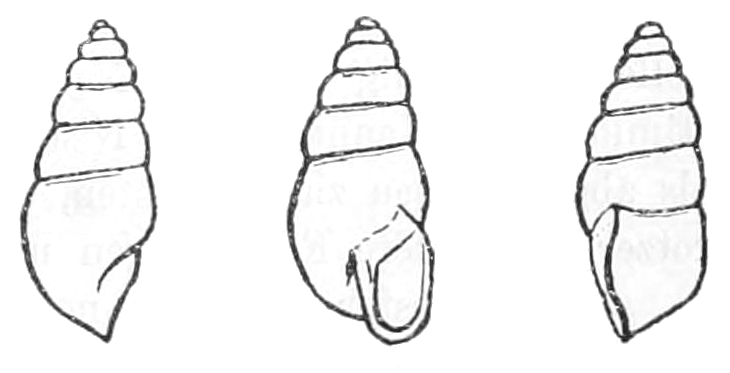
- Drawing of three views of a shell of Spelaeoconcha paganettii from its original description by Rudolf Sturany in 1901

Scientific classification
- Kingdom: Animalia
- Phylum: Mollusca
- Class: Gastropoda
- Order: Stylommatophora
- Suborder: Helicina
- Infraorder: Pupilloidei
- Superfamily: Pupilloidea
- Family: Spelaeoconchidae; A. J. Wagner, 1928
- Genus: Spelaeoconcha; Sturany, 1901
- Species: S. paganettii

Binomial name
- Spelaeoconcha paganettii Sturany, 1901

Subspecies
- Spelaeoconcha paganettii alphonsi Maassen, 1989; Spelaeoconcha paganettii paganettii Sturany, 1902; Spelaeoconcha paganettii polymorpha A. J. Wagner, 1914

= Spelaeoconcha =

Species of gastropod

Spelaeoconcha paganettii is a species of small air-breathing land snail, a terrestrial pulmonate gastropod mollusk in the superfamily Pupilloidea. It is the only species in the monotypic family Spelaeoconchidae.

== Taxonomy ==
The family Spelaeoconchidae is classified within the informal clade Orthurethra, itself belonging to the clade Stylommatophora within the clade Eupulmonata (according to the taxonomy of the Gastropoda by Bouchet & Rocroi, 2005). The family Spelaeoconchidae has no subfamilies.

== Distribution ==
The distribution of Spelaeoconcha paganettii includes Croatia and Bosnia and Herzegovina.

== Description ==
The shell is whitish or pale yellowish, almost smooth and very shiny. The shell has 7 not very convex whorls. The last whorl is ascending shortly before the aperture. The aperture is without teeth. Apertural margin is thickened except on upper side, and with a wavy contour seen from the side. The umbilicus is open but narrow, only partly covered by columellar margin of the aperture.

The width of the shell is 2.5–2.6 mm. The height of the shell is 5.4–6.1 mm.

== Ecology ==
This small snail was found under stone rubble, on blackish-brown soil in a cave.
