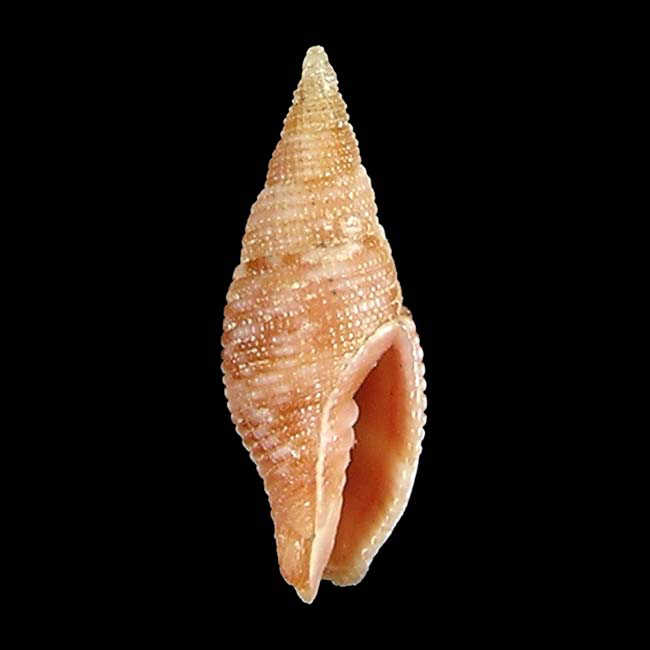
- Gemmulimitra strongae shell

Scientific classification
- Kingdom: Animalia
- Phylum: Mollusca
- Class: Gastropoda
- Subclass: Caenogastropoda
- Order: Neogastropoda
- Family: Mitridae
- Genus: Gemmulimitra
- Species: G. strongae

Binomial name
- Gemmulimitra strongae (Poppe, Tagaro & Salisbury, 2009)

Synonyms
- Mitra (Neocancilla) strongae Poppe, Tagaro & R. Salisbury, 2009; Mitra strongae Poppe, Tagaro & Salisbury, 2009

= Gemmulimitra strongae =

Species of gastropod

Gemmulimitra strongae is a species of sea snail, a marine gastropod mollusk in the family Mitridae, the miters or miter snails.

== Distribution ==
This marine species occurs off Papua New Guinea and Japan.
