= Gemmulimitra gonatophora =

Scientific classification
- Kingdom: Animalia
- Phylum: Mollusca
- Class: Gastropoda
- Subclass: Caenogastropoda
- Order: Neogastropoda
- Family: Mitridae
- Genus: Gemmulimitra
- Species: G. gonatophora

Binomial name
- Gemmulimitra gonatophora (Sturany, 1903)

Synonyms
- Mitra gonatophora Sturany, 1903

Species of gastropod

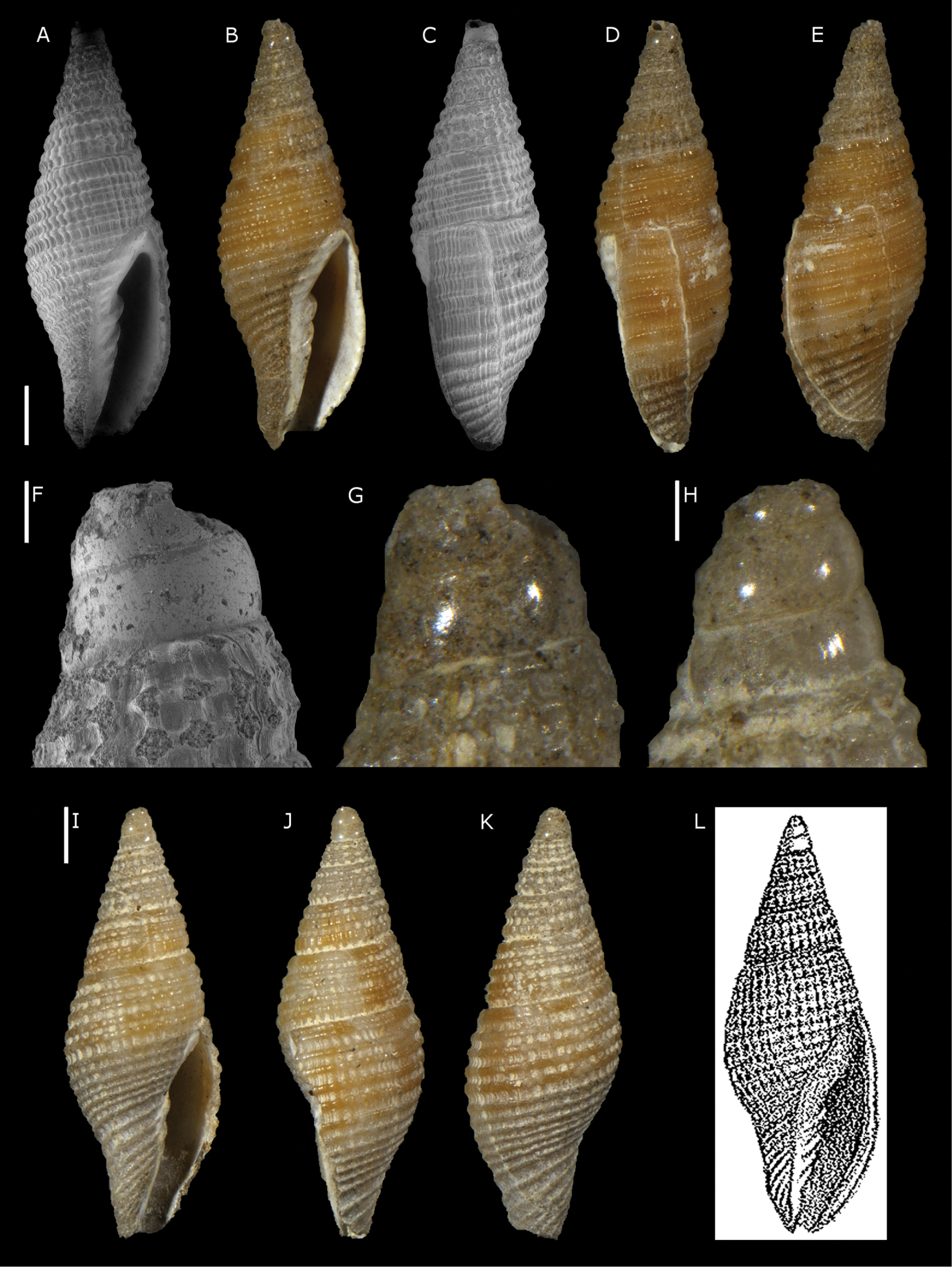
Mitra gonatophora Sturany

Gemmulimitra gonatophora is a species of sea snail, a marine gastropod mollusk in the family Mitridae, the miters or miter snails.
