= Gyraulus kahuica =

Scientific classification
- Kingdom: Animalia
- Phylum: Mollusca
- Class: Gastropoda
- Superorder: Hygrophila
- Family: Planorbidae
- Genus: Gyraulus
- Species: G. kahuica

Binomial name
- Gyraulus kahuica (Finlay & Laws, 1931)

Species of gastropod

Gyraulus kahuica is a species of minute, air-breathing freshwater snail, an aquatic pulmonate gastropod mollusc or micromollusc in the family Planorbidae, the ram's horn snailss. All planorbids have sinistral shells. It is native to New Zealand.

== Etymology ==
The species name kahuica is derived from "Kahu", a Māori personal name, and was part of the tribal name of the principal Māori tribe in the Hawke's Bay district of New Zealand.

== Description ==
The shell is sinistral and planispiral.
