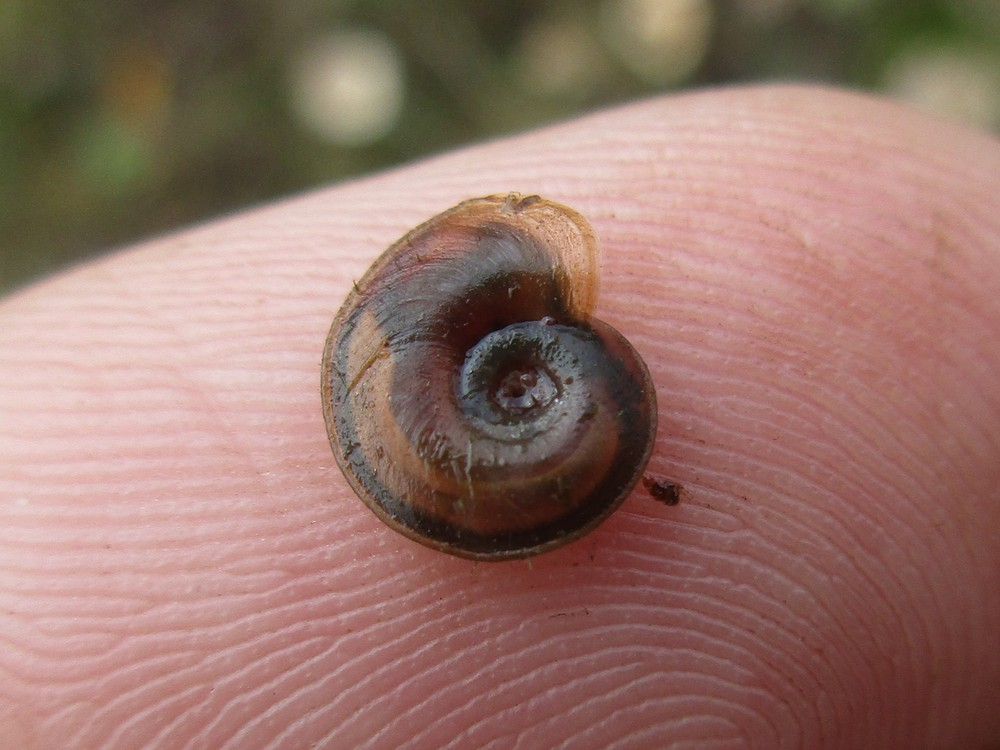

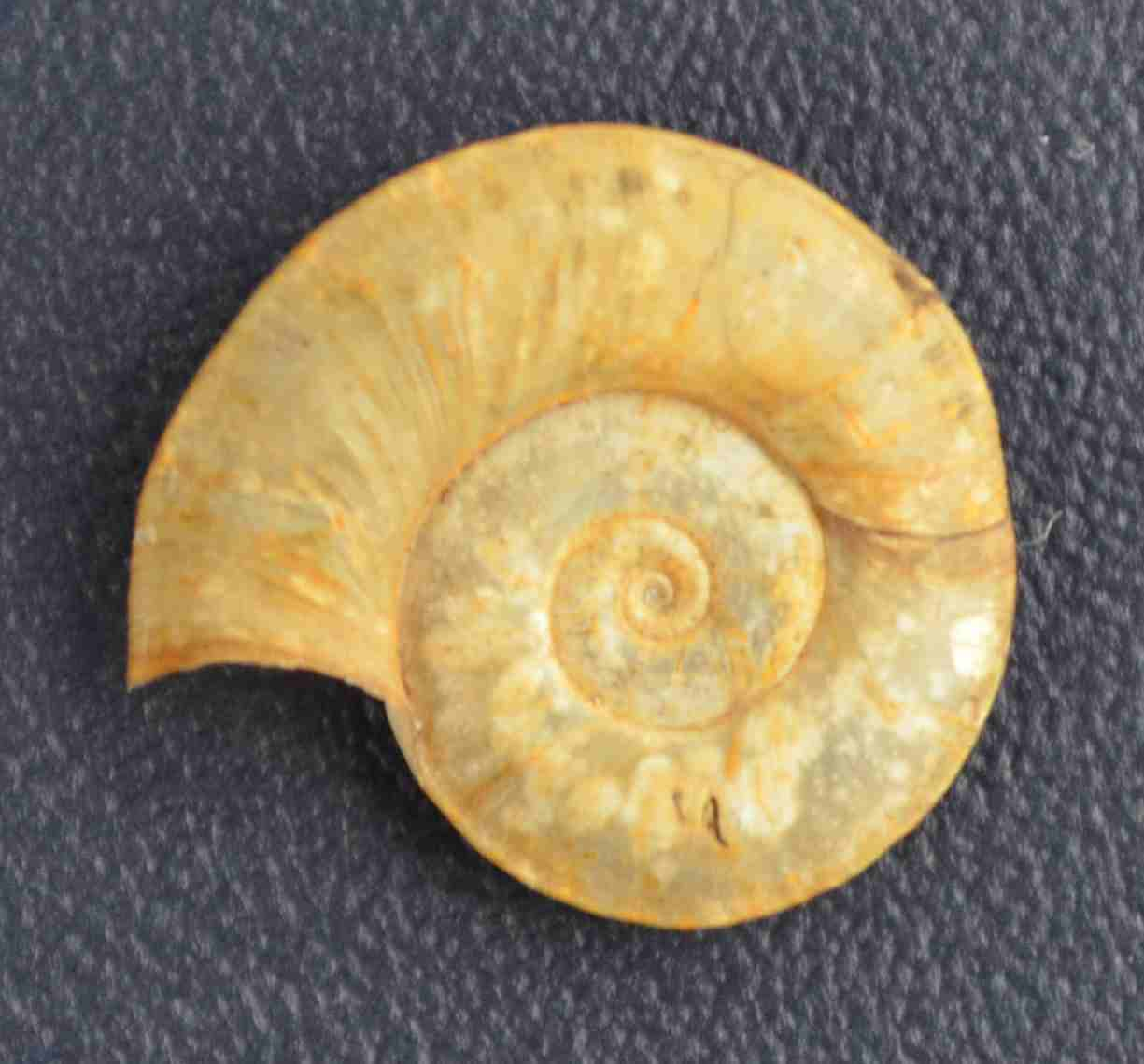

Conservation status
- Least Concern (IUCN 3.1)

Scientific classification
- Kingdom: Animalia
- Phylum: Mollusca
- Class: Gastropoda
- Superorder: Hygrophila
- Family: Planorbidae
- Genus: Planorbis
- Species: P. carinatus

Binomial name
- Planorbis carinatus O. F. Müller, 1774
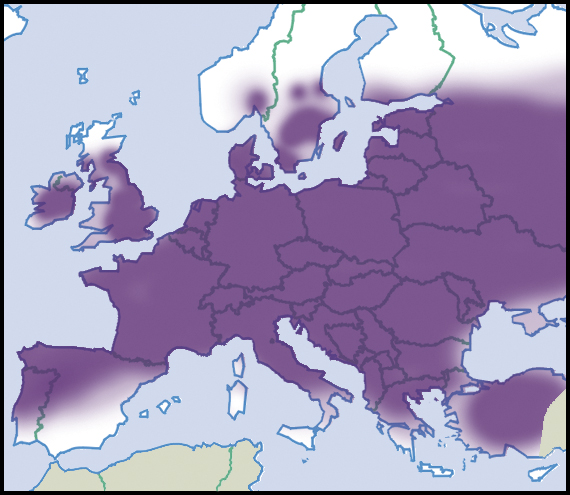

Synonyms
- List: Anisus carinatus (O. F. Müller, 1774); superseded combination; Helix planata Maton & Rackett, 1807; junior subjective synonym; Planorbis (Anisus) tenellus S. Studer, 1820; junior synonym; Planorbis (Anisus) umbilicatus S. Studer, 1820; junior synonym; Planorbis (Planorbis) carinatus O. F. Müller, 1774; alternative representation; Planorbis (Planorbis) dubius W. Hartmann, 1821; junior subjective synonym; Planorbis marginatus var. dubius W. Hartmann, 1821; junior subjective synonym; Planorbis tenerrimus M. Bielz, 1851; unaccepted

= Planorbis carinatus =

Species of gastropod

Planorbis carinatus is species of air-breathing freshwater snail, a pulmonate gastropod mollusk in the family Planorbidae, the ramshorn snails.

== Description ==
The width of shell of this species is 9–15 mm. The shell has a noticeable keel at the center of the periphery of the body whorl.

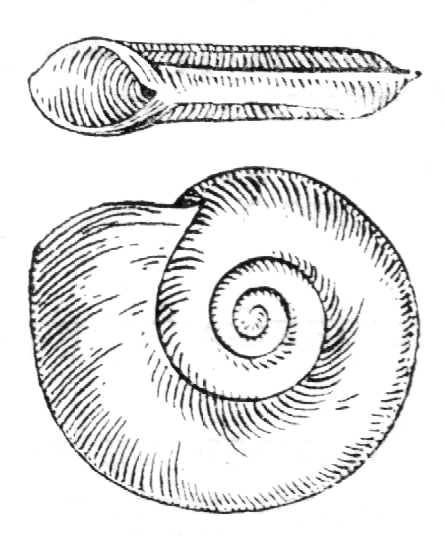

== Distribution ==
Planorbis carinatus is found across Europe from Spain to Scandinavia. The Distribution type is European Wide-temperate range.

- This species has been evaluated for the IUCN red list as 'Least Concern'.
- Czech Republic
- Slovakia
- Germany
- Netherlands
- Poland

== Ecology ==
The habitat of this species is larger water bodies such as the open water of canals, rivers and lakes. It is essentially a hard water species and it is only locally found in very soft or acid waters.
