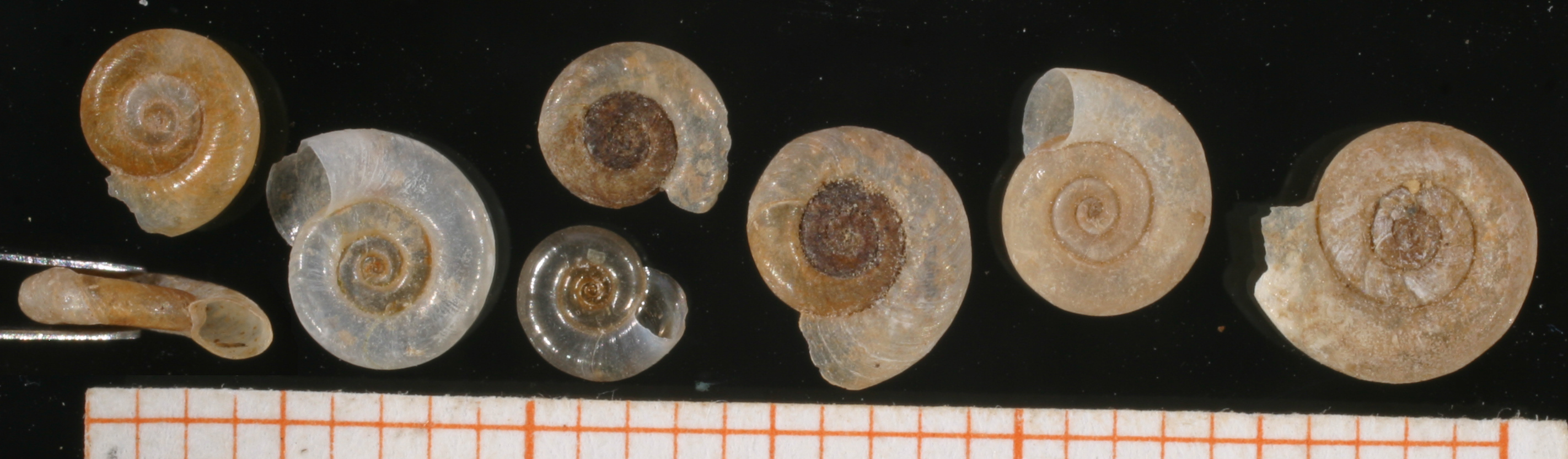
- A group of shells of Gyraulus chinensis, scale bar in mm

Conservation status
- Least Concern (IUCN 3.1)

Scientific classification
- Kingdom: Animalia
- Phylum: Mollusca
- Class: Gastropoda
- Superorder: Hygrophila
- Family: Planorbidae
- Genus: Gyraulus
- Species: G. chinensis

Binomial name
- Gyraulus chinensis (Dunker, 1848)

= Gyraulus chinensis =

Species of gastropod

Gyraulus chinensis is a species of small freshwater snail, an aquatic pulmonate gastropod mollusc in the family Planorbidae, the ram's horn snails.

== Distribution ==
This species is native to Asia.

The non-indigenous distribution for this species includes:

- Czech Republic as a "hothouse alien"
- Great Britain, as a "hothouse alien"
- Netherlands
