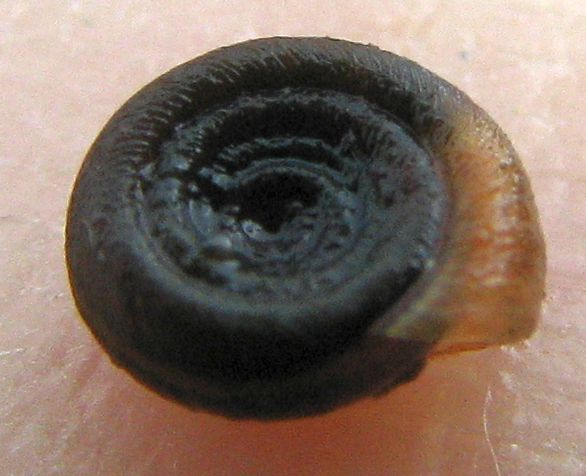
- Bathyomphalus contortus

Scientific classification
- Domain: Eukaryota
- Kingdom: Animalia
- Phylum: Mollusca
- Class: Gastropoda
- Superorder: Hygrophila
- Family: Planorbidae
- Subfamily: Planorbinae
- Genus: Bathyomphalus; Charpentier, 1837

= Bathyomphalus =

Genus of gastropods

Bathyomphalus is a genus of small air-breathing freshwater snails, aquatic pulmonate gastropod mollusks in the family Planorbidae, the ramshorn snails and their allies.

== Species ==
Species within this genus include:

- Bathyomphalus contortus Linnaeus, 1758 - type species
