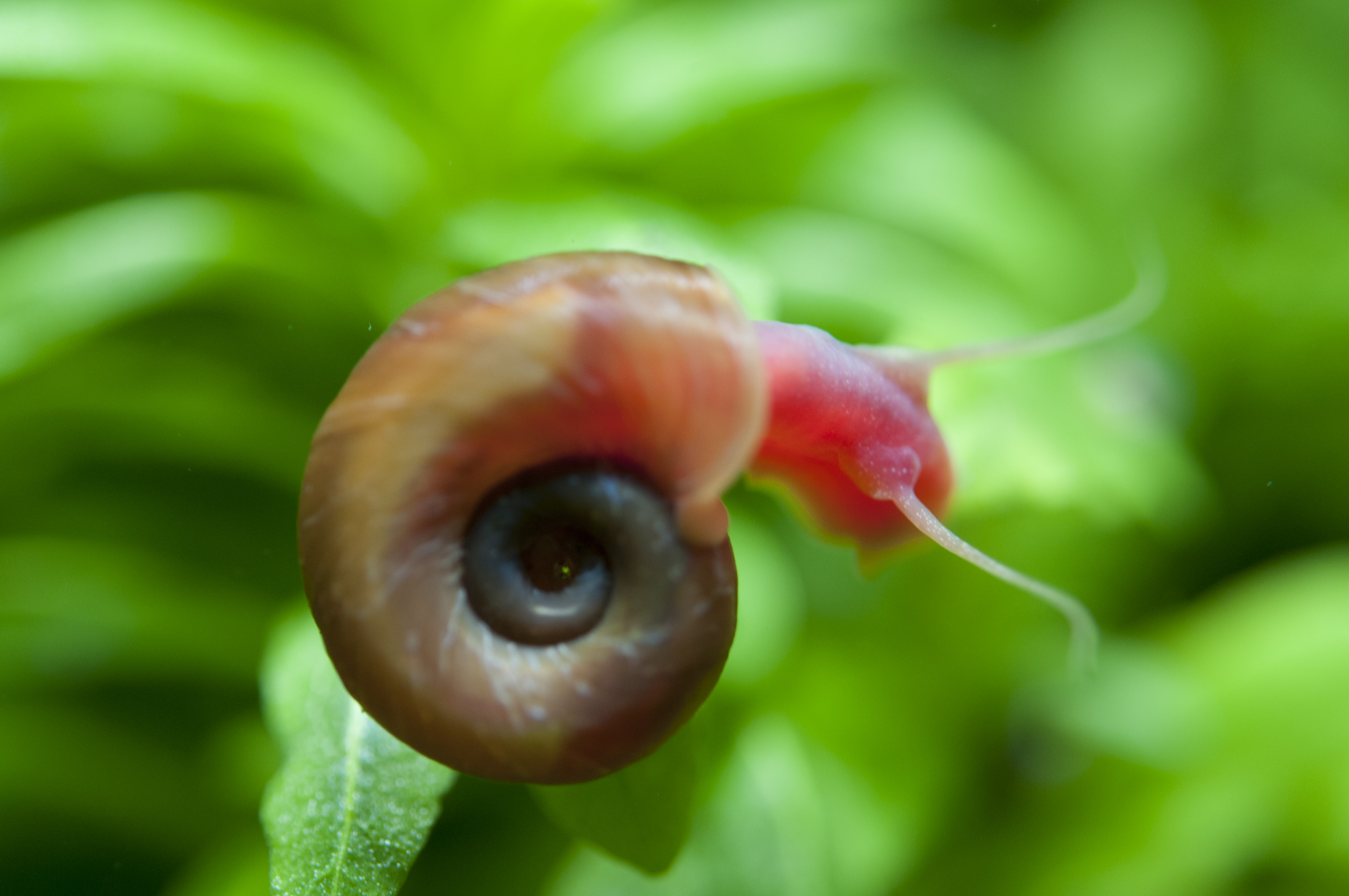

Conservation status
- Least Concern (IUCN 3.1)

Scientific classification
- Kingdom: Animalia
- Phylum: Mollusca
- Class: Gastropoda
- Superorder: Hygrophila
- Family: Planorbidae
- Genus: Planorbis
- Species: P. planorbis

Binomial name
- Planorbis planorbis (Linnaeus, 1758)

Synonyms
- List: Helix limbata Da Costa, 1778; Helix planorbis Linnaeus, 1758; Helix rhombea Turton, 1819; Planorbis (Anisus) umbilicatus (Müller, 1774); Planorbis (Planorbis) planorbis (Linnaeus, 1758); Planorbis (Planorbis) rhombeus Turton, 1819; Planorbis (Planorbis) umbilicatus Müller, 1774; Planorbis (Tropidiscus) planorbis (Linnaeus, 1758); Planorbis (Tropidiscus) umbilicatus (Müller, 1773); Planorbis (Tropodiscus) umbilicatus Müller, 1774; Planorbis marginatus Draparnaud, 1805; Planorbis marginatus var. fontinalis Hazay, 1880; Planorbis morletianus Crosse, 1888; Planorbis umbilicatus Müller, 1774; Tropidiscus planorbis (Linnaeus, 1758)

= Planorbis planorbis =

Species of gastropod

Planorbis planorbis is a species of air-breathing freshwater snail, an aquatic gastropod mollusk in the family Planorbidae, the ram's horn snails.

== Taxonomy ==
Planorbis planorbis was originally described as Helix planorbis by Carl Linnaeus in Systema Naturae in 1758.

== Distribution ==
Planorbis planorbis can be found across much of Europe and Northern Africa. It is considered invasive in many European countries, including:

- Czech Republic - least concern (LC)
- Slovakia
- Germany
- the Netherlands
- Poland
- Great Britain
- Ireland
- Hungary

== Description ==
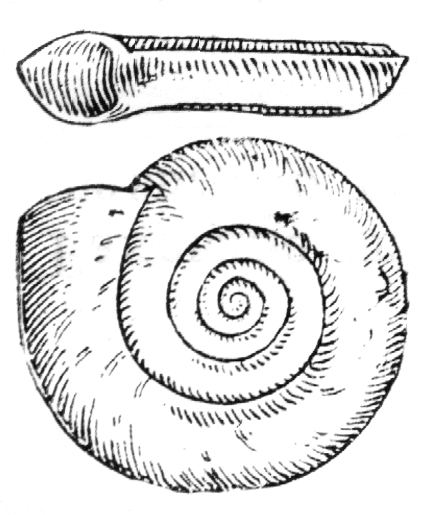
Drawing of the shell of Planorbis planorbis. Upper image: Lateral view showing the profile of the shell. Lower image: Umbilical view; this side is carried uppermost in the living snail.

This species, like all planorbids, has a sinistral shell. The width of the shell is 15 – 20 mm. The keel on the periphery of the shell is near the edge closest to the spire side, which is carried downwards in life.

== Ecology ==
The habitat of this species is shallow standing and slowly running freshwaters on a mud substrate, also ponds and temporarily drying flood waters, up to 1 m (3.3 ft) depth. It seems to prefer habitats with large amounts of vegetation and high pH. Planorbis planorbis does not tolerate intensive water movements but is tolerant to eutrophic conditions.

Between 1–500 individuals per square meter may be found per water source.

== Reproduction ==
Planorbis planorbis has 2 reproductive cycles per year, which are tied to the seasons. In the northern hemisphere, spawning takes place in February and during the summer–early autumn. Juveniles likely grow fast enough to participate in the next spawning season. After reproduction, the snails may survive through the following winter.
