= Gyraulus acronicus =

Scientific classification
- Kingdom: Animalia
- Phylum: Mollusca
- Class: Gastropoda
- Superorder: Hygrophila
- Family: Planorbidae
- Genus: Gyraulus
- Species: G. acronicus

Binomial name
- Gyraulus acronicus (A. Férussac, 1807)

Synonyms
- Planorbis acronicus Férussac, 1807

Species of gastropod

Gyraulus acronicus is a small species of freshwater snail, an aquatic pulmonate gastropod mollusk in the family Planorbidae, the ram's horn snails.

== Distribution ==
The distribution of this species is Holarctic.

It is known to occur in islands and countries including:

- Czech Republic
- Slovakia
- Germany - critically endangered (vom Aussterben bedroht)
- Poland - endangered
- Great Britain

== Description ==
The shell is nearly planispiral in its coiling.

== Habitat ==
This small snail lives on water plants in freshwater.
