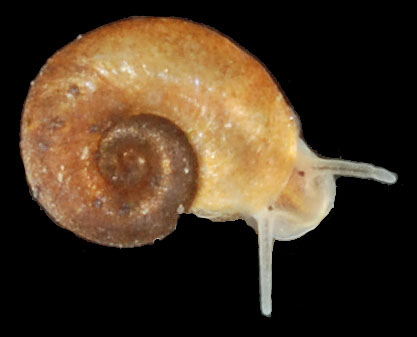

Conservation status
- Least Concern (IUCN 3.1)

- Secure (NatureServe)

Scientific classification
- Kingdom: Animalia
- Phylum: Mollusca
- Class: Gastropoda
- Superorder: Hygrophila
- Family: Planorbidae
- Genus: Gyraulus
- Species: G. parvus

Binomial name
- Gyraulus parvus (Say, 1817)

Synonyms
- List: Anisus (Gyraulus) laevis (Alder, 1838); Gyraulus (Gyraulus) laevis (Alder, 1838); Gyraulus (Torquis) laevis (Alder, 1838); Gyraulus (Torquis) parvus (Say, 1817); Gyraulus cressmani F. C. Baker, 1942 †; Gyraulus cyclostomus F. C. Baker, 1934 †; Gyraulus labiatus A. B. Leonard, 1948 †; Gyraulus laevis (Alder, 1838); Gyraulus similaris (F. C. Baker, 1919); Gyraulus vermicularis albolineatus J. Henderson, 1933; Planorbis (Gyraulus) glaber Jeffreys, 1830; Planorbis (Gyraulus) laevis Alder, 1838; Planorbis (Gyraulus) parvus Say, 1817; Planorbis billingsii I. Lea, 1864; Planorbis concavus J. G. Anthony, 1843; Planorbis elevatus C. B. Adams, 1840; Planorbis glaber Jeffreys, 1830; Planorbis glaber var. compressa Lloyd, 1874; Planorbis laevis Alder, 1838; Planorbis parvus Say, 1817; Planorbis parvus var. walkeri Vanatta, 1902; Planorbis similaris F. C. Baker, 1919; Planorbis similis F. C. Baker, 1919; Planorbis thermalis Westerlund, 1885

= Gyraulus parvus =

Species of gastropod

Gyraulus parvus is a species of freshwater snail in the family Planorbidae, the ram's horn snails. It is known by the common name ash gyro. It is native to much of North America and the Caribbean, where it occurs in Canada, the United States (including Puerto Rico), Mexico, Hispaniola, Jamaica, and Cuba. It is also an introduced species in Eurasia, including Austria, the Czech Republic, France, Germany, and Israel.

This common snail occurs in many types of freshwater habitat, such as ponds and lakes. It consumes diatoms and other periphyton that it scrapes off of surfaces. It sometimes rests attached to water plants.

This snail has a thin, transparent, whitish-gray shell measuring 2.5 to 5 millimeters wide. It has 4 to 5 whorls. The upper side is concave and the lower side is flat.

This snail is an intermediate host for schistosomes that cause swimmer's itch.
