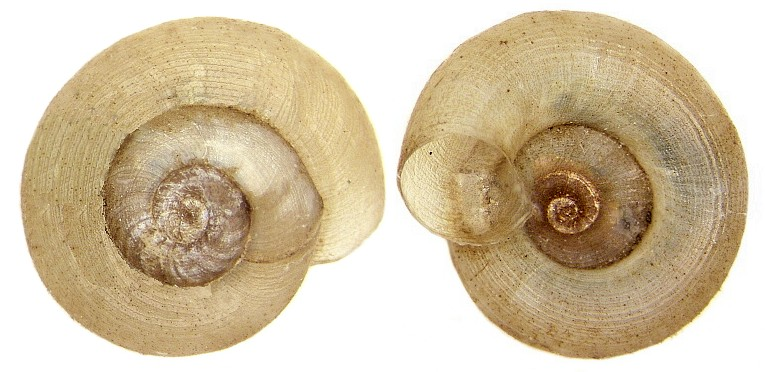

Scientific classification
- Domain: Eukaryota
- Kingdom: Animalia
- Phylum: Mollusca
- Class: Gastropoda
- Superorder: Hygrophila
- Family: Planorbidae
- Genus: Gyraulus
- Species: G. albus

Binomial name
- Gyraulus albus (O. F. Müller, 1774)

Synonyms
- Planorbis albus Müller, 1774; Planorbis hispidus Draparnaud, 1805

= Gyraulus albus =

Species of gastropod

Gyraulus albus, common name white ramshorn, is a small species of freshwater snail, an aquatic pulmonate gastropod mollusk in the family Planorbidae, the ram's horn snails.

Gyraulus albus is the type species of the genus Gyraulus.

== Distribution ==
Palearctic:

- Belgium
- Czech Republic - least concern (LC)
- Germany
- Hungary
- Netherlands
- Poland
- Slovakia
- Great Britain
- Ireland

== Habitat ==
This small snail lives in various types of freshwater habitats among weed and on bottom mud. It doesn't require a high level of calcium.

== Description ==
The shell of this species is rather small, reaching a height of 1.3 - 1.8 mm and a width of 4 – 7 mm. This shell has a discoid shape with 4 - 4½ body whorls that expand in the direction of the aperture. This aperture and the whorls are curved and do not have a keel.

The shell of this species is white (sometimes darkened by mud deposits) and has a characteristic spiral sculpture.
