= Gyraulus corinna =

Scientific classification
- Kingdom: Animalia
- Phylum: Mollusca
- Class: Gastropoda
- Superorder: Hygrophila
- Family: Planorbidae
- Genus: Gyraulus
- Species: G. corinna

Binomial name
- Gyraulus corinna Gray, 1850

Species of gastropod

Gyraulus corinna is a species of minute, air-breathing freshwater snail, an aquatic pulmonate gastropod mollusc, or micromollusc in the family Planorbidae, the ram's horn snails, or planorbids. All planorbids have sinistral or left-coiling shells.

== Distribution ==
This species is endemic to New Zealand.

== Shell description ==
This species, like all planorbids, has a sinistral shell. The shell in this species is very minute, discoidal, with four slowly increasing whorls. The shell coloration is greenish-white to light brown. The width of the shell is up to 3.3 mm, and the height is up to 0.8 mm.
