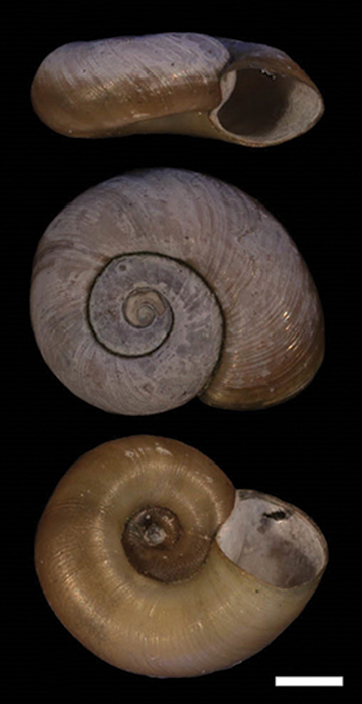
- Views of a Gyraulus takhteevi shell

Scientific classification
- Kingdom: Animalia
- Phylum: Mollusca
- Class: Gastropoda
- Superorder: Hygrophila
- Family: Planorbidae
- Subfamily: Planorbinae
- Tribe: Planorbini
- Genus: Gyraulus; Charpentier, 1837

Type species
- Planorbis albus O. F. Müller, 1774

Synonyms
- List: Anisus (Gyraulus) Charpentier, 1837; Anisus (Microanisus) Moskvicheva, 1986; Caillaudia Bourguignat, 1883; Choanomphalodes Lindholm, 1927; Choanomphalus (Lamorbis) Starobogatov, 1967; Choanomphalus (Pseudogyraulus) Prozorova & Starobogatov, 1997; Glyptanisus Iredale, 1943; Gyraulus (Caillaudia) Bourguignat, 1883; Gyraulus (Carinogyraulus) Polinski, 1929; Gyraulus (Choanomphalodes) Lindholm, 1927; Gyraulus (Gyraulus) Charpentier, 1837; Gyraulus (Lamorbis) Starobogatov, 1967; Gyraulus (Microanisus) Moskvicheva, 1986; Gyraulus (Nautilinus) Mousson, 1872; Gyraulus (Pygmanisus) Iredale, 1943; Gyraulus (Torquis) Dall, 1905; Lamorbis Starobogatov, 1967; Plananisus Iredale, 1943; Planaria T. Brown, 1827; Planorbis (Gyraulus) ICharpentier, 1837; Planorbis (Torquis) IDall, 1905; †Ptychospira Slavík, 1869; Pygmanisus Iredale, 1943; Trochlea Haldeman, 1842

= Gyraulus =

Gyraulus Temporal range: Early Cretaceous - Recent, 125–0 Ma

Genus of gastropods

Gyraulus is a genus of small, mostly air-breathing, freshwater snails, aquatic pulmonate gastropod mollusks in the family Planorbidae, the ram's horn snails.

The genus Gyraulus is known from the Early Cretaceous to the present. Fossils attributed to Gyraulus sp. have been found in the lakebottom sediments of the Yixian Formation in China, dating to 125 million years ago.

== Description ==
Shells of the species within this genus are small, and are mostly almost planispiral in their coiling.

== Distribution and habitat ==
The distribution of this genus is Holarctic. These snails live on water plants in freshwater.

== Species ==
The following species are recognised in the genus Gyraulus:

- Gyraulus acronicus (A. Férussac, 1807)
- †Gyraulus aegaeus Willmann, 1981
- †Gyraulus albertanus (Clessin, 1877)
- Gyraulus albidus Radoman, 1953 (Lake Ohrid, Albania and North Macedonia)
- Gyraulus albus (O. F. Müller, 1774) (Caucasus, Central Asia, Europe, Russia and northern Middle East)
- †Gyraulus alienus (Rolle, 1862)
- Gyraulus amplificatus (Mori, 1938)
- Gyraulus amuricus (Prozorova & Starobogatov, 1998)
- †Gyraulus andrussovi (A. A. Ali-Zade & Kabakova, 1969)
- †Gyraulus antunesi Callapez, 2003
- †Gyraulus applanatus (Thomä, 1845)
- Gyraulus argaeicus (Sturany, 1904) (Turkey)
- †Gyraulus arminiensis Jekelius, 1932
- Gyraulus associatus (Westerlund, 1883)
- Gyraulus atkinsoni (R. M. Johnston, 1879)
- †Gyraulus austroalpinus (Harzhauser & Neubauer, 2012)
- †Gyraulus bachmayeri Schlickum & Strauch, 1979
- Gyraulus barrackporensis Schlickum & Strauch, 1979 (India and Bangladesh; however, due to incomplete distributional data, it may he also present in Bhutan, China, and Nepal)
- Gyraulus bakeri Brandt, 1974 (northern Thailand)
- †Gyraulus bakonicus (Halaváts, 1902)
- †Gyraulus balmensis Gründel, Pélissié & Guérin, 2000
- Gyraulus balteatus van Benthem Jutting, 1963
- Gyraulus bekaensis Glöer & Bößneck, 2007 (Lebanon)
- †Gyraulus bigueti (Fontannes, 1880)
- Gyraulus biwaensis (Preston, 1916)
- †Gyraulus blazkai (Klika, 1891)
- †Gyraulus bondartchuki (Prysjazhnjuk, 1974)
- Gyraulus borealis (Lovén, 1875)
- †Gyraulus bosqueti (Glibert & de Heinzelin de Braucourt, 1954)
- †Gyraulus brlici (Brusina, 1897)
- Gyraulus brongersmai van Benthem Jutting, 1963
- †Gyraulus brusinai (Lörenthey, 1894)
- †Gyraulus calamensis (Dareste de la Chavanne, 1910)
- Gyraulus centrifugops (Prozorova & Starobogatov, 1997)
- Gyraulus centrifugus (Westerlund, 1897)
- †Gyraulus ceratioides (Fontannes, 1884)
- †Gyraulus chaenostomus (Brusina, 1902)
- †Gyraulus chapmani McMichael, 1968
- Gyraulus chinensis (Dunker, 1848) (East and Southeast Asia, Mongolia and less likely Papua New Guinea .However, it was also introduced to Europe)
- Disk Gyro (Gyraulus circumstriatus) (Tryon, 1866) (Canada and the US)
- Gyraulus clymene (Shuttleworth, 1852) (Canary Islands, Spain)
- Gyraulus cockburni (Godwin-Austen, 1883) (Socotra island, Yemen)
- †Gyraulus connivens (Eichwald, 1830)
- Gyraulus connollyi D. S. Brown & Van Eeden, 1969 (Eswatini and South Arica)
- †Gyraulus constans (Brusina, 1884)
- Gyraulus convexiusculus (T. Hutton, 1849) (Asia)
- Gyraulus cordatus (F. Sandberger, 1862)
- Gyraulus corinna (Gray, 1850) (New Zealand)
- †Gyraulus costatus (Klein, 1846)
- Gyraulus costulatus (Krauss, 1848) (Africa)
- †Gyraulus courpoilensis (Carez, 1881)
- Gyraulus crenophilus Hubendick & Radoman, 1959 (Lake Orhid, Albania and North Macedonia)
- †Gyraulus crescens (Hilgendorf, 1867)
- Nautilus Ram's-horn Snail (Gyraulus crista) (Hilgendorf, 1867)
- †Gyraulus cryptornatus (Sauerzopf, 1953)
- †Gyraulus dalmaticus (Brusina, 1884)
- †Gyraulus dealbatus (A. Braun, 1851)
- Gyraulus deflectus (Say, 1824)
- †Flexed Gyro (Gyraulus deflectus) (F. Sandberger, 1858) (Canada and northern US)
- Gyraulus demissus (Westerlund, 1883)
- †Gyraulus denudatus (Hilgendorf, 1867)
- †Gyraulus dimitrovici (Brusina, 1902)
- †Gyraulus distortus (Hyatt, 1880)
- †Gyraulus dongcunensis W. Yü, 1980
- †Gyraulus dongcunensis W. Yü, 1984
- †Gyraulus doricus (Bukowski, 1896)
- †Gyraulus doseni (Brusina, 1902)
- †Gyraulus douvillei (Saporta, 1889)
- Gyraulus edgbastonensis D. S. Brown, 2001 (Queensland, Australia)
- †Gyraulus edlaueri (Sauerzopf, 1953)
- Gyraulus egirdirensis Glöer & Girod, 2013
- Gyraulus ehrenbergi (H. Beck, 1837) (Nile river, Egypt)
- Gyraulus eichwaldi (Clessin & W. Dybowski, 1887)
- Gyraulus elenae Vinarski, Glöer & Palatov, 2013
- †Gyraulus elisus (Dall, 1915)
- Gyraulus essingtonensis (E. A. Smith, 1882)
- Gyraulus eugyne Meier-Brook, 1983
- Gyraulus euphraticus (Mousson, 1874) (Afganistan, China, Middle East, South Asia and Turkey)
- Gyraulus feuerborni B. Rensch, 1934
- †Gyraulus florissantensis (T. D. A. Cockerell, 1906)
- Gyraulus fontinalis Hubendick & Radoman, 1959 (Lake Orhid Basin, Albania and North Macedonia)
- †Gyraulus formosus (Brusina, 1902)
- †Gyraulus fragilis (Pavlović, 1903)
- Gyraulus frigidarius van Benthem Jutting, 1963
- †Gyraulus fuchsi (Lörenthey, 1902)
- †Gyraulus gaoyouensis W. Yü, 1977
- †Gyraulus geminus (Brusina, 1897)
- Gyraulus gilberti (Dunker, 1848) (eastern Australia)
- †Gyraulus gladilini (Pavlović, 1931)
- †Gyraulus globosus (Sauerzopf, 1953)
- †Gyraulus goetzendorfensis (Sauerzopf, 1953)
- †Gyraulus goussardianus (Noulet, 1854)
- †Gyraulus gracilis (Gozhik & Prysjazhnjuk, 1978)
- Gyraulus hebraicus (Bourguignat, 1852) (Lebanon, Syria and Turkey)
- †Gyraulus helicophantoides (Pavlović, 1927)
- Gyraulus hesperus (Iredale, 1943) (northern coast of Australia in the states of Northern Territory, Queensland and Western Australia)
- †Gyraulus heudei (Rolle, 1860) (Vietnam)
- †Gyraulus hians (Rolle, 1860)
- Gyraulus hiemantium (Westerlund, 1883)
- Gyraulus hindsianus (Dunker, 1848)
- †Gyraulus hoernesi (Rolle, 1860)
- †Gyraulus homalosomus (Brusina, 1902)
- Gyraulus homsensis (Dautzenberg, 1894)
- †Gyraulus horasanensis Schütt, 1991
- Tuba Gyro (Gyraulus hornensis) F. C. Baker, 1934 (southeastern Canada and the North Center US)
- Gyraulus hubendicki Brandt, 1974 (southern Thailand)
- †Gyraulus huguenini (Fontannes, 1880)
- Gyraulus huronensis J. B. Burch & Y. Jung, 1990
- Gyraulus huwaizahensis Glôer & Naser, 2007 (Iraq and less likely Iran)
- †Gyraulus ignoratus Schlickum & Puisségur, 1977
- Gyraulus illibatus (Westerlund, 1883)
- Gyraulus infirmus (Mori, 1938)
- Gyraulus infraliratus (Westerlund, 1877)
- †Gyraulus inopinatus (S. Meunier, 1880)
- †Gyraulus inornatus (Brusina, 1902)
- Gyraulus ioanis Glöer & Pešić, 2007 (Albania and Montenegro)
- Gyraulus isingi (Cotton & Godfrey, 1932)
- Gyraulus iwaotakii (Mori, 1938)
- Gyraulus janinensis (Mousson, 1859) (Lake Pambotis, Greece)
- †Gyraulus jugleri (Dunker, 1843)
- †Gyraulus jukici (Brusina, 1902)
- †Gyraulus jurkovici (Brusina, 1902)
- Gyraulus kahuica (Finlay & Laws, 1931) (New Zealand)
- †Gyraulus katurici (Brusina, 1897)
- †Gyraulus keideli (Schlosser, 1906)
- †Gyraulus kleini Gottschick & Wenz, 1916
- Gyraulus kosiensis Glöer & Bössneck, 2013
- †Gyraulus kosovensis (Pavlović, 1903)
- †Gyraulus kraussii (Klein, 1846)
- †Gyraulus krohi Neubauer & Harzhauser, 2014
- Gyraulus kruglowiae (Johansen, 1937)
- Gyraulus labiatus (Johansen, 1937) (South Asia and Myanmar)
- Gyraulus ladacensis (G. Nevill, 1878)
- Smooth Ram’s Horn Snail (Gyraulus laevis) (G. Nevill, 1878) (Caucasus, Europe and Morocco)
- †Gyraulus laiwuensis Yen, 1969
- †Gyraulus lazici (Brusina, 1892)
- †Gyraulus lendli (Brusina, 1902)
- †Gyraulus liaoxiensis X.-H. Yu, 1987
- Gyraulus limbatus van Benthem Jutting, 1963
- †Gyraulus lineolatus (Brusina, 1878)
- †Gyraulus lorentheyi (Brusina, 1902)
- †Gyraulus loryi (Coquand, 1856)
- †Gyraulus ludovici (Noulet, 1854)
- Gyraulus luguhuensis F.-Y. Shu, Köhler, C.-C. Fu & H.-Z. Wang, 2013
- Gyraulus lychnidicus Hesse, 1928 (Lake Ohrid, Albania and North Macedonia)
- †Gyraulus macroconcha (Popova & Starobogatov, 1970)
- Gyraulus malayensis Meier-Brook, 1983
- †Gyraulus marinkovici (Brusina, 1892)
- Gyraulus marocanus Mabrouki, Glöer & Taybi, 2022
- †Gyraulus matheroni (P. Fischer & Tournouër, 1873)
- †Gyraulus matraensis Gál et al., 1999
- Gyraulus mauritianus (Morelet, 1876) (Mauritius. However, it may also be present on Réunion Island and Seychelles)
- Gyraulus meierbrooki Glöer & Pešić, 2007 (Skadar Lake, Albania and Montenegro)
- Gyraulus meridionalis (Brazier, 1875)
- Gyraulus messonghi Glöer & Zettler, 2021 (Corfu, Greece)
- †Gyraulus micromphalus (T. Fuchs, 1870)
- Gyraulus mienanus D. S. Brown, 1998
- †Gyraulus militaris (C. A. White, 1880)
- Gyraulus minusculus (Moskvicheva, 1980)
- †Gyraulus mirabilis (Popova, 1981)
- Gyraulus montrouzieri (Gassies, 1863)
- †Gyraulus multicingulatus Wenz, 1919
- †Gyraulus nedici (Brusina, 1902)
- Gyraulus nedyalkovi Glöer & Georgiev, 2012 (Mediterranean Region, Turkey)
- †Gyraulus nematophorus (Brusina, 1902)
- †Gyraulus nisseanus (Pavlović, 1931)
- †Gyraulus novaki (Brusina, 1897)
- Gyraulus noziriensis (Mori, 1938)
- †Gyraulus nusici (Pavlović, 1903)
- †Gyraulus oecsensis Wenz, 1919
- †Gyraulus okrugljakensis Neubauer, Harzhauser, Kroh, Georgopoulou & Mandic, 2014
- †Gyraulus oncostomus (Brusina, 1902)
- †Gyraulus orahovacensis (Pavlović, 1903)
- †Gyraulus oxystoma (Klein, 1846)
- †Gyraulus pachychilus (Brusina, 1902)
- †Gyraulus palaeoalbus S.-Y. Guo, 1982
- Gyraulus pamphylicus Glöer & Rähle, 2009 (Turkey)
- Gyraulus pankongensis Glöer & Rähle, 2009 (Lake Pankong, China and India)
- †Gyraulus parvulus (Lörenthey, 1906)
- †Gyraulus parvulus (Meek & Hayden, 1856)
- Ash Gyro (Gyraulus parvus) (Say, 1817)
- †Gyraulus pavlovici (Brusina, 1893)
- †Gyraulus peruzzii (De Stefani, 1880)
- †Gyraulus phacecercus (Brusina, 1902)
- Gyraulus piscinarum (Bourguignat, 1852) (Bulgaria, Iran, Israel, Lebanon, Syria and Turkey)
- †Gyraulus placidus (Volkova, 1953)
- †Gyraulus planoconcavus H.-L. Gu, 1989
- †Gyraulus planorbiformis (Zieten, 1832)
- †Gyraulus platystomus Nützel & Bandel, 1993
- †Gyraulus pleiopleurus (G. D. Hanna, 1923)
- †Gyraulus pliosibericus Yen, 1969
- †Gyraulus polycymus (Fontannes, 1884)
- †Gyraulus ponticus (Lörenthey, 1893)
- †Gyraulus popovici (Pavlović, 1927)
- †Gyraulus porcellaneus (Lörenthey, 1902)
- †Gyraulus praeponticus (Gorjanović-Kramberger, 1890)
- †Gyraulus praesibericus Yen, 1969
- Gyraulus prasongi Brandt, 1974 (southern Thailand and possibly Malaysia)
- †Gyraulus primiformis (Sauerzopf, 1953)
- Gyraulus proclivis (E. von Martens, 1897)
- †Gyraulus protectus Jekelius, 1944
- †Gyraulus protocrescens Nützel & Bandel, 1993
- †Gyraulus pseudhomalosomus (Sauerzopf, 1953)
- †Gyraulus pseudotenuis (Hilgendorf, 1867)
- †Gyraulus ptychostomus (Brusina, 1902)
- †Gyraulus ptycophorus (Brusina, 1892)
- †Gyraulus pulici (Brusina, 1897)
- Himehiramakimizumaimai (Gyraulus pulcher) Rintelen, T. 2011 (Amaji and Shikoku islands, Japan)
- †Gyraulus quadrangulus (Neumayr, 1875)
- †Gyraulus rabensis (Blanckenhorn, 1897)
- †Gyraulus rasseri Neubauer, Harzhauser, Kroh, Georgopoulou & Mandic, 2014
- †Gyraulus revertens (Hilgendorf, 1867)
- †Gyraulus rhytidophorus (Brusina, 1902)
- Sjöskivsnäcka (Gyraulus riparius) (Westerlund, 1865) (northwestern Europe (Benelux and Nordic regions) and fractured range in the Baltics, Belarus, and Central Europe)
- Gyraulus rossiteri (Crosse, 1871) (New Caledonia)
- Gyraulus rossmaessleri (Auerswald, 1852) (Central and Eastern Europe, Baltics, Benelux and Romania)
- †Gyraulus rotella (Rousseau, 1842)
- Gyraulus rotula (W. H. Benson, 1850) (India, Sri Lanka and less likely Thailand)
- †Gyraulus rotundistomus (Sauerzopf, 1953)
- †Gyraulus rotundostomus Nützel & Bandel, 1993
- †Gyraulus rumanus Wenz, 1932
- †Gyraulus sabljari (Brusina, 1892)
- †Gyraulus sachsenhoferi Harzhauser & Neubauer, 2012
- †Gyraulus saltensis (Germain, 1922)
- †Gyraulus sauerzopfi Neubauer, Kroh, Harzhauser, Georgopoulou & Mandic, 2015
- †Gyraulus scabiosus (G. D. Hanna, 1922)
- Gyraulus scottianus (R. M. Johnston, 1879)
- †Gyraulus sebetinus (de Lapparent, 1938)
- †Gyraulus seibersdorfensis (Sauerzopf, 1953)
- Gyraulus sentaniensis van Benthem Jutting, 1963
- Gyraulus shasi Glöer & Pešić, 2007 (Albania and Montenegro)
- Gyraulus siamensis (E. von Martens, 1867) (Cambodia, Laos, Malaysia, Thailand and Vietnam)
- †Gyraulus sibinjensis (Brusina, 1897)
- †Gyraulus sigillatus (Volkova, 1953)
- Gyraulus sivalensis (Clessin, 1884)
- †Gyraulus slavonicus (Brusina, 1897)
- †Gyraulus soceni Jekelius, 1944
- †Gyraulus solenoeides (Lörenthey, 1902)
- Gyraulus spirillus (A. Gould, 1859)
- †Gyraulus spratti (E. Forbes, 1845)
- †Gyraulus spretus (Noulet, 1868)
- Gyraulus stankovici Hadžišče, 1953 (Lake Prespa, Albania and Northern Macedonia)
- †Gyraulus steinheimensis (Hilgendorf, 1867)
- †Gyraulus stenocyclotus (Fontannes, 1884)
- †Gyraulus stoppanii (Sacco, 1886)
- Gyraulus stromi (Westerlund, 1881)
- †Gyraulus subhemistoma (A. d'Orbigny, 1852)
- †Gyraulus subverticillus (Oppenheim, 1919)
- †Gyraulus sulfureus (Royo Gómez, 1922)
- Gyraulus sumatranus (E. von Martens, 1897)
- †Gyraulus supremus (Hilgendorf, 1867)
- †Gyraulus symmetricus (Sauerzopf, 1953)
- Gyraulus takhteevi Sitnikova & Peretolchina, 2018
- Gyraulus taseviensis Glöer & Girod, 2013 (Lake Egirdir, Turkey)
- †Gyraulus tenuistriatus (Gorjanović-Kramberger, 1899)
- Gyraulus terekholicus (Prozorova & Starobogatov, 1997)
- Gyraulus terraesacrae B. Rensch, 1934 (Java, Indonesia)
- †Gyraulus tetracarinatus (Pavlović, 1903)
- Gyraulus tokyoensis (Mori, 1938)
- †Gyraulus transsylvanicus (Neumayr, 1875)
- Gyraulus trapezoides Poliński, 1929 (Lake Ohrid, Albania and North Macedonia)
- †Gyraulus tressinensis (Oppenheim, 1890)
- †Gyraulus triquetrus (Hilgendorf, 1867)
- †Gyraulus trochiformis (Stahl, 1824)
- †Gyraulus trolli (Sauerzopf, 1953)
- †Gyraulus turislavicus Jekelius, 1944
- Gyraulus umbiliciferus (Kozhov, 1936)
- Gyraulus vermicularis (A. Gould, 1847)
- †Gyraulus verticilloides (Pavlović, 1931)
- Gyraulus velifer (A. Gould, 1847) (Inlé lake, Myanmar)
- Gyraulus verticillus (Brusina, 1892)
- †Gyraulus veternus (Meek & Hayden, 1865)
- †Gyraulus virgatus (Ludwig, 1865)
- †Gyraulus vrapceanus Neubauer, Harzhauser, Kroh, Georgopoulou & Mandic, 2014
- Waterhouse’s Freshwater Snail (Gyraulus waterhousei) (Clessin, 1884) (Australia)
- Gyraulus xingtian H. Chen, Y.-M. He, H.-Q. Xiang & X.-P. Wu, 2025
- †Gyraulus xinlitunensis X.-H. Yu, 1987
- †Gyraulus yongkangensis W. Yü, 1980
- †Gyraulus yuanchuensis W. Yü, 1965
- †Gyraulus zemendorfensis (Sauerzopf, 1953)
- Gyraulus zilchianus (Sauerzopf, 1953) (Yangtze River Delta, China)
- †Gyraulus zoebeleini Schlickum & Strauch, 1974
- †Gyraulus zoltani Perrilliat & Vega, 2008
