= Rudolf Sturany =

Austrian malacologist (1867–1935)

Rudolf Sturany (13 April 1867 – 28 February 1935) was an Austrian zoologist who specialized in the field of malacology, the study of mollusks.

== Education ==
He studied zoology at the University of Leipzig under Rudolf Leuckart and at the University of Vienna, where his instructors included Carl Claus, Friedrich Moritz Brauer and Karl Grobben. In 1891 he obtained his PhD at Vienna.

== Career ==
In September 1889 he began work as a volunteer at the Natural History Museum of Vienna, later serving as a curator, being entrusted with the collections of mollusks, bryozoans, brachiopods and tunicates. During his career, he took frequent trips for scientific research in Bosnia, Herzegovina, Dalmatia, Montenegro, Albania and Crete. In 1924 he retired from museum work due to a deteriorating eye condition.

Sturany was the taxonomic authority for numerous mollusk species, a few examples being: Spelaeoconcha paganettii, Pseudobithynia pentheri and Mitra gonatophora. The land snail genus Sturanyella, in all likelihood, is named after him.

== Selected writings ==
- Lamellibranchiaten des Rothen Meeres, 1899 – Lamellibranches of the Red Sea.
- W.A. Obrutschew's Mollusken-Ausbiete aus Hochasien, 1900 – Wladimir Afanasjewitsch Obrutschew's collection from Central Asia.
- Gastropoden des Rothen Meeres, 1904 – Gastropods of the Red Sea.
- Über schalentragende Landmolusken aus Albanien und Nachbargebieten, 1915 – On shell-bearing land mollusks of Albania and neighboring areas.
