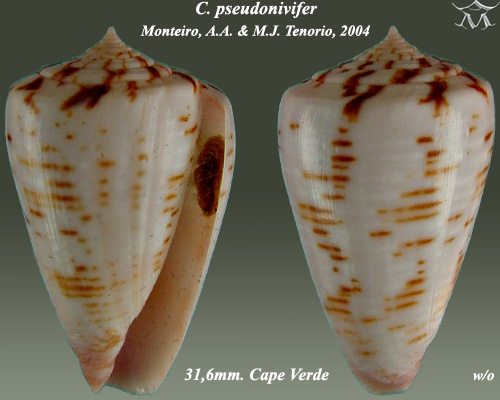
- Apertural and abapertural views of shell of Conus pseudonivifer Monteiro, A.A. & M.J. Tenorio, 2004
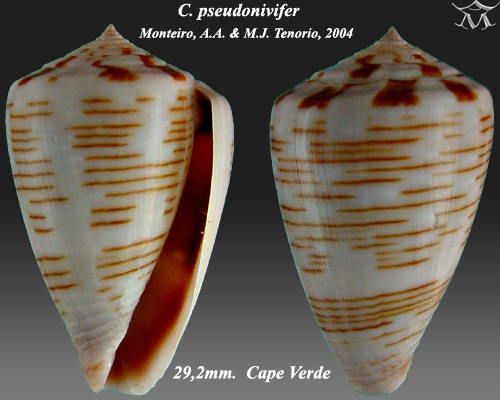

Conservation status
- Least Concern (IUCN 3.1)

Scientific classification
- Kingdom: Animalia
- Phylum: Mollusca
- Class: Gastropoda
- Subclass: Caenogastropoda
- Order: Neogastropoda
- Superfamily: Conoidea
- Family: Conidae
- Genus: Conus
- Species: C. pseudonivifer

Binomial name
- Conus pseudonivifer Monteiro, Tenorio & Poppe, 2004

Synonyms
- Conus (Kalloconus) pseudonivifer Monteiro, Tenorio & Poppe, 2004 · accepted, alternate representation; Trovaoconus pseudonivifer (Monteiro, Tenorio & Poppe, 2004)

= Conus pseudonivifer =

Species of sea snail

Conus pseudonivifer is a species of sea snail, a marine gastropod mollusk in the family Conidae, the cone snails and their allies.

Like all species within the genus Conus, these snails are predatory and venomous. They are capable of stinging humans, therefore live ones should be handled carefully or not at all.

== Description ==
The size of the shell varies between 24 mm and 50 mm.

It is a white shell. Its color forms of some spots and spot like features as well as interior and exterior parts ranges from light brown and butterscotch to brown to chocolate and chestnut brown.

== Distribution ==
This species occurs in the Atlantic Ocean off the Cape Verdes.

== Gallery ==
Below are several color forms:

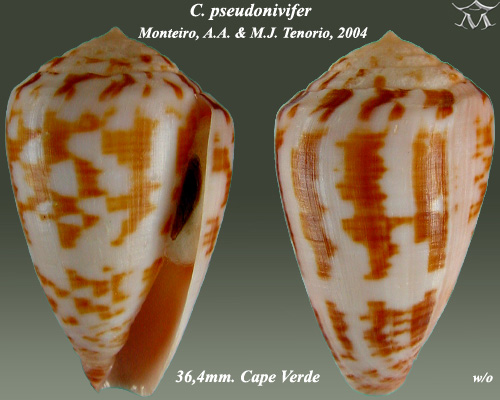
Conus pseudonivifer Monteiro, A.A. & M.J. Tenorio, 2004

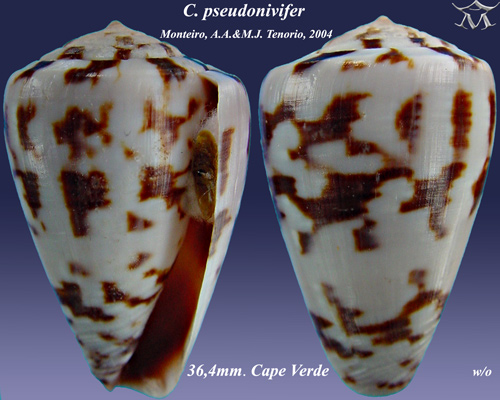
Conus pseudonivifer Monteiro, A.A. & M.J. Tenorio, 2004

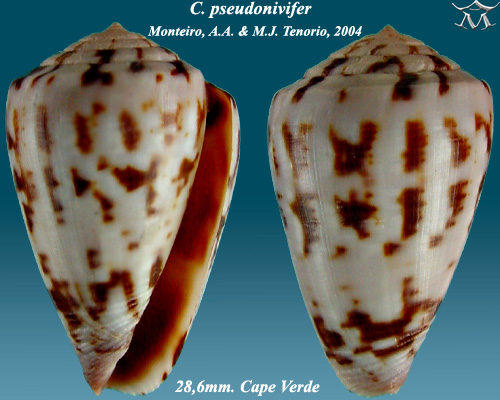
Conus pseudonivifer Monteiro, A.A. & M.J. Tenorio, 2004

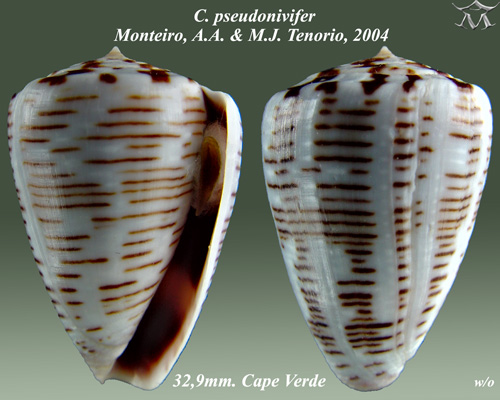
Conus pseudonivifer Monteiro, A.A. & M.J. Tenorio, 2004

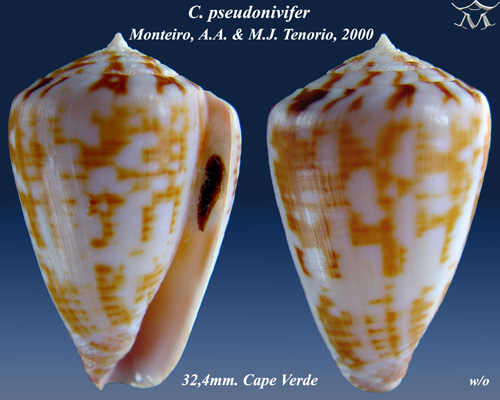
Conus pseudonivifer Monteiro, A.A. & M.J. Tenorio, 2004
