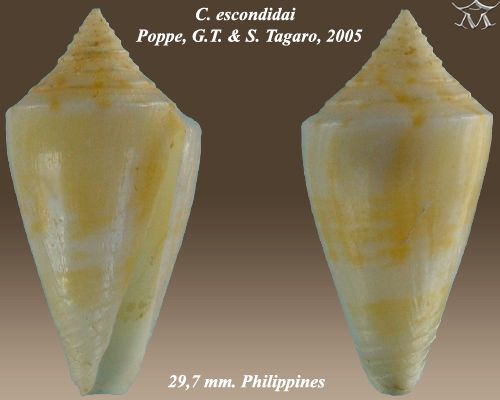
- Apertural and abapertural views of shell of Conus escondidai Poppe, G.T. & S. Tagaro, 2005

Conservation status
- Data Deficient (IUCN 3.1)

Scientific classification
- Kingdom: Animalia
- Phylum: Mollusca
- Class: Gastropoda
- Subclass: Caenogastropoda
- Order: Neogastropoda
- Superfamily: Conoidea
- Family: Conidae
- Genus: Conus
- Species: C. escondidai

Binomial name
- Conus escondidai Poppe & Tagaro, 2005

Synonyms
- Conus (Lividoconus) escondidae (Petuch, 1995) · accepted, alternate representation; Calamiconus escondidai (Poppe & Tagaro, 2005); Lividoconus escondidai (Poppe & Tagaro, 2005)

= Conus escondidai =

Species of sea snail

Conus escondidai is a species of sea snail, a marine gastropod mollusk in the family Conidae, the cone snails and their allies.

Like all species within the genus Conus, these snails are predatory and venomous. They are capable of stinging humans, therefore live ones should be handled carefully or not at all.

== Description ==
The size of the shell varies between 30 mm and 52 mm.

== Distribution ==
This marine species occurs off the Philippines.
