= Seguenzia giovia =

Scientific classification
- Kingdom: Animalia
- Phylum: Mollusca
- Class: Gastropoda
- Subclass: Vetigastropoda
- Superfamily: Seguenzioidea
- Family: Seguenziidae
- Subfamily: Seguenziinae
- Genus: Seguenzia
- Species: S. giovia

Binomial name
- Seguenzia giovia Dall, 1919

Species of gastropod

Seguenzia giovia is a species of extremely small deep water sea snail, a marine gastropod mollusk in the family Seguenziidae.

== Description ==
(Original description by W.H. Dall) The shell is higher (6 mm) than broad (5 mm). The shell resembles Seguenzia certoma Dall, 1919, but it is larger and differently sculptured. The minute nucleus is smooth, subglobular followed by seven sculptured whorls. The obscure suture is laid on the peripheral keel. The spiral sculpture shows four narrow prominent keels, of which the second is peripheral, the third marginates the base, and the fourth is on the base, the interspaces much wider and becoming narrower anteriorly. There are also seven closer even low threads on the base with subequal interspaces. The posterior wide interspaces are sculptured with close-set fine spiral thread. The axial sculpture shows numerous equal and equally spaced arcuate threads, with wide interspaces, which on the upper whorls bead the posterior carina, but later are chiefly visible in the interspaces and extend over the whole shell. The sulcus at the aperture next the body is shallow. The outer lip beyond it is moderately produced and crenulate by the sculpture. The thin and arcuate columella has a very small notch at its base. There is a deep twisted perforate umbilicus and a thin layer of enamel on the body.

== Distribution ==
The type specimen was found in the Pacific Ocean off Catalina Island, California.
