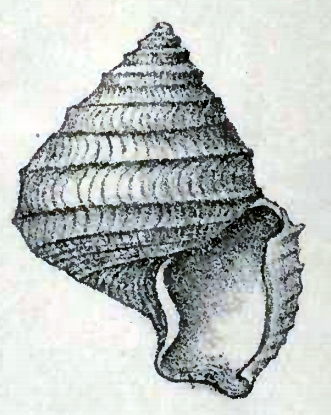
- Drawing with an apertural view of a shell of Seguenzia eritima

Scientific classification
- Kingdom: Animalia
- Phylum: Mollusca
- Class: Gastropoda
- Subclass: Vetigastropoda
- Family: Seguenziidae
- Genus: Seguenzia
- Species: S. eritima

Binomial name
- Seguenzia eritima A. E. Verrill, 1884

= Seguenzia eritima =

Species of gastropod

Seguenzia eritima is a species of sea snail, a marine gastropod mollusk in the family Seguenziidae.

== Description ==
The height of the shell attains 4.5 mm. The sculpture is more delicate. The carinae are less acute. The riblets finer and closer. The basal lines finer and more numerous than in Seguenzia nitida. It is also narrowly umbilicated.

== Distribution ==
This species occurs in the Atlantic Ocean off Delaware, USA, at depths between 2359 m and 3718 m
