= Seguenzia donaldi =

Scientific classification
- Kingdom: Animalia
- Phylum: Mollusca
- Class: Gastropoda
- Subclass: Vetigastropoda
- Superfamily: Seguenzioidea
- Family: Seguenziidae
- Subfamily: Seguenziinae
- Genus: Seguenzia
- Species: S. donaldi

Binomial name
- Seguenzia donaldi Ladd, 1982

Species of gastropod

Seguenzia donaldi is a species of extremely small deep water sea snail, a marine gastropod mollusk in the family Seguenziidae.
