= Seguenzia transenna =

Scientific classification
- Kingdom: Animalia
- Phylum: Mollusca
- Class: Gastropoda
- Subclass: Vetigastropoda
- Superfamily: Seguenzioidea
- Family: Seguenziidae
- Subfamily: Seguenziinae
- Genus: Seguenzia
- Species: S. transenna

Binomial name
- Seguenzia transenna B. A. Marshall, 1983

Species of gastropod

Seguenzia transenna is a species of extremely small deep water sea snail, a marine gastropod mollusk in the family Seguenziidae.

== Description ==
The height of this translucent, nacreous, white shell attains 3.1 mm, with a similar width of 2.8 mm.

== Distribution ==
The type specimen of this marine species was found off New Zealand in the Tasman Basin at a depth of 1029 m.
