= Rotellenzia lampra =

Scientific classification
- Kingdom: Animalia
- Phylum: Mollusca
- Class: Gastropoda
- Subclass: Vetigastropoda
- Superfamily: Seguenzioidea
- Family: Seguenziidae
- Subfamily: Seguenziinae
- Genus: Rotellenzia
- Species: R. lampra

Binomial name
- Rotellenzia lampra (Watson, 1879)

Synonyms
- Basilissa lampra Watson, 1879 (original description)

Species of gastropod

Rotellenzia lampra is a species of extremely small deep water sea snail, a marine gastropod mollusk in the family Seguenziidae.

== Description ==
(Original description by Watson) The height of the shell attains 7.6 mm. The thin, white, opalescent, smooth shell is faintly reticulated. It has a high concave spire, a sharp apex, an acute carina, an angulated umbilicus, and a rhomboidal aperture.

Sculpture: The shell is smooth, glossy, and iridescent. It has ten to twenty faint spiral threads on the upperside of the body whorl. The last of these which joins the lip is much stronger than the others. A little remote and below is a thread forming the keel, below which, and nearer, are two other strong threads. Round the umbilicus are also two strong threads. The intermediate space on the base is marked with eight to ten impressed spiral striae. The interstices of the spirals are crossed by longitudinals, which are regular, fine, hair-like, but distinct and well parted. Their curve on the surface below the suture shows the old sinus. On the base they are radiating and are crowded and irregular, except round the umbilicus, where in the first two or three striae they are very sharp and distinct. On the upper whorls both the spirals and longitudinals are finer, but sharper, than on the last.

Colour: a greyish, horny, translucent, opalescent white.

The spire is raised, with a concave outline. The apex, which consists of the single minute embryonic whorl, is sharp and slightly extends out. It is quite smooth, but the spirals and longitudinals begin sharply immediately below it. The 6½ whorls show a slow and regular increase except the last, which widens rapidly. They are depressed, quite flat, except the last, which is slightly rounded above, and still more slightly concave on the base, with an acute, but still rounded keel. The suture is impressed on the body whorl, but on the upper whorls sharply, though slightly, marginated below. The aperture is a little oblique, rhomboidal, the basal and palatal lines being nearly parallel, while the outer and inner lip diverge downwards. The outer lip is thin, not patulous, not descending, advancing at its junction with the body whorl, and then retreating so as to form a shallow, broad, open sinus a little below the suture, acutely, but roundedly, angulate at the periphery, nearly flat on the base, with a very slight nick at the point of the columella, where it joins the inner lip at a slightly obtuse angle. The pcolumellar lip is straight. It is a very little thickened, and is slightly porcellanous. It advances a little on the edge of the umbilicus. Below this it is hollowed out by a receding curve, but advances again into a slight rounded projection just above its junction with the outer lip. In its whole direction it inclines slightly to the left. The umbilicus is oblique edged, funnel-shaped, being wide in the mouth and deep, with straight converging sides. It is slightly marked with lines of gi'owtli and a few faint spirals. While all the rest of the shell without and within is brightly opalescent, it is scarcely so at all.

== Distribution ==
This species occurs in the mid Pacific Ocean, east of Japan.
