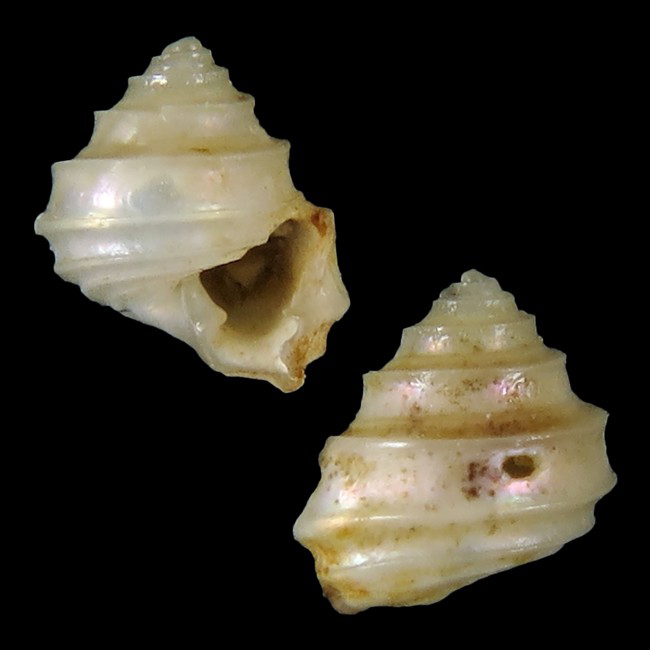

Scientific classification
- Kingdom: Animalia
- Phylum: Mollusca
- Class: Gastropoda
- Subclass: Vetigastropoda
- Family: Seguenziidae
- Genus: Seguenzia
- Species: S. beloni

Binomial name
- Seguenzia beloni Poppe, Tagaro & Dekker, 2006

Synonyms
- Volvarina torresiana Laseron, C.F., 1957 (lapsus)

= Seguenzia beloni =

Species of gastropod

Seguenzia beloni is a species of sea snail, a marine gastropod mollusk in the family Seguenziidae. Specimens were discovered in a trawl at 400 meters depth then named after Pierre Belon (1517–1564), a French naturalist.

== Description ==
The height of the shell attains 2.5 mm.

== Distribution ==
This marine species occurs off the Philippines, and lives near the ocean floor within the demersal zone of tropical waters.
