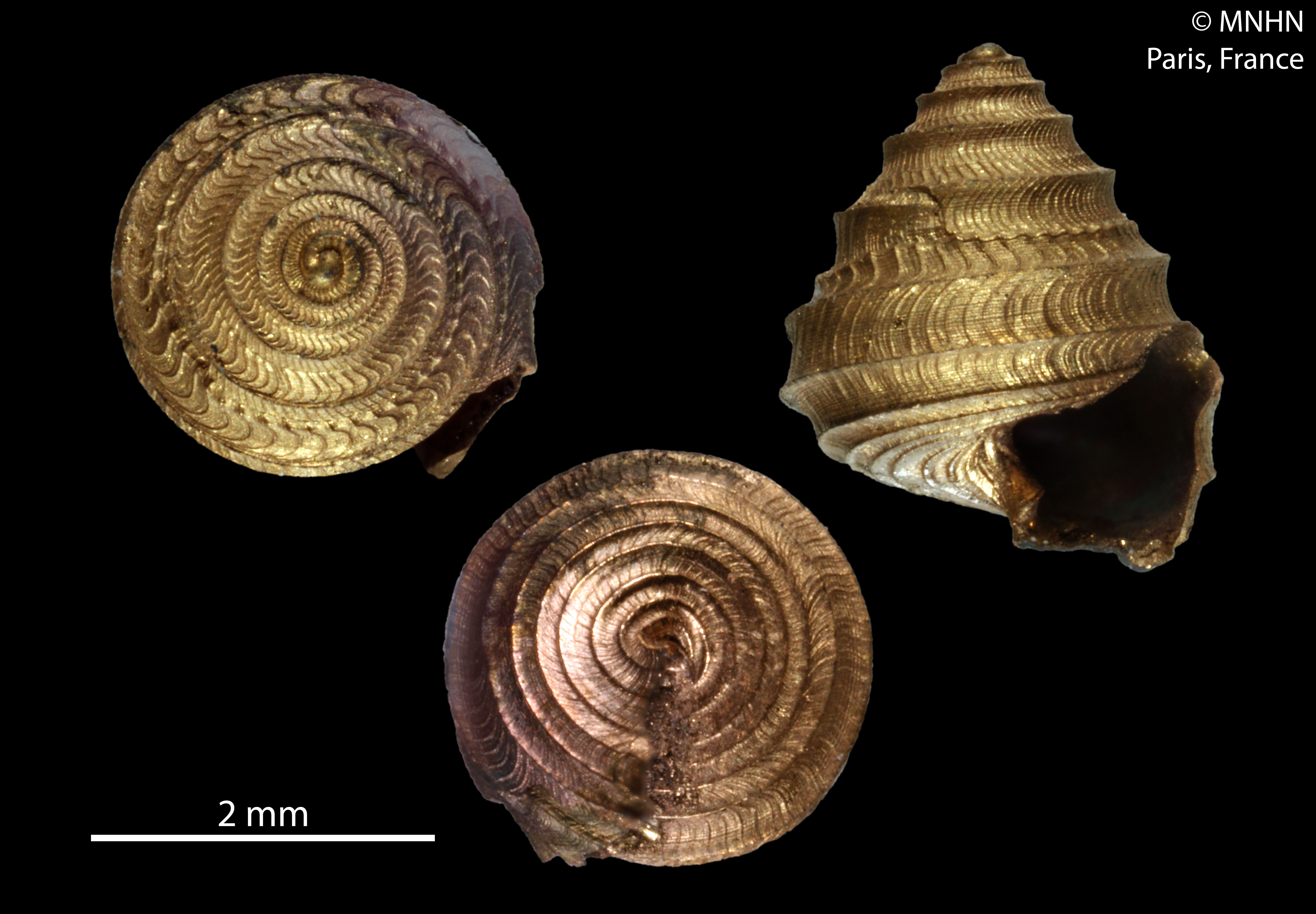
- Shell of Seguenzia elegans (specimen at MNHN, Paris)

Scientific classification
- Kingdom: Animalia
- Phylum: Mollusca
- Class: Gastropoda
- Subclass: Vetigastropoda
- Family: Seguenziidae
- Genus: Seguenzia
- Species: S. elegans

Binomial name
- Seguenzia elegans Jeffreys, 1885

= Seguenzia elegans =

Species of gastropod

Seguenzia elegans is a species of sea snail, a marine gastropod mollusk in the family Seguenziidae.

== Description ==
The size of the shell varies between 3 mm and 4.3 mm. The base is perforated or umbilicated. The fissure of the outer lip is close to the suture. The columella is produced below. The aperture is broadly truncately sinuous on the base.

== Distribution ==
This species occurs in the Atlantic Ocean off the Bay of Biscay, Madeira, Bermuda; also off Brazil and Argentine.
