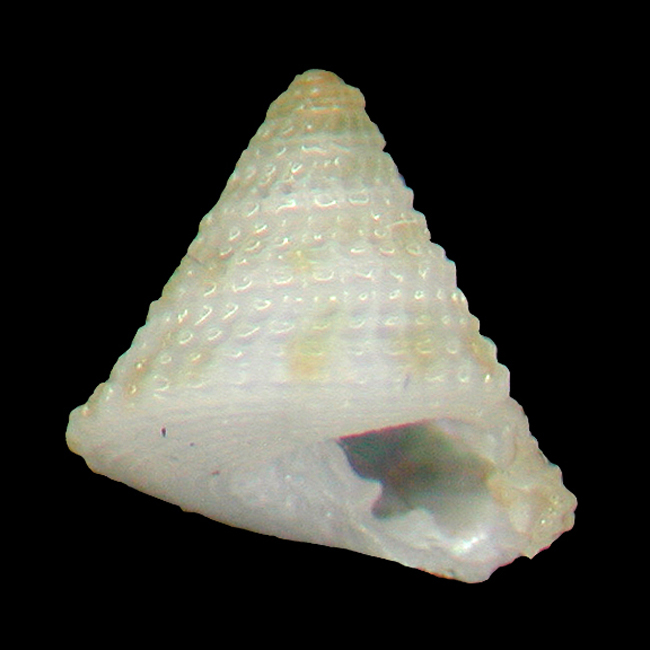

Scientific classification
- Kingdom: Animalia
- Phylum: Mollusca
- Class: Gastropoda
- Subclass: Vetigastropoda
- Family: Seguenziidae
- Genus: Visayaseguenzia
- Species: V. maestratii

Binomial name
- Visayaseguenzia maestratii Poppe, Tagaro & Dekker, 2006

= Visayaseguenzia maestratii =

Species of gastropod

Visayaseguenzia maestratii is a species of sea snail, a marine gastropod mollusk in the family Seguenziidae.

== Description ==
The size of the shell varies between 1.6 mm and 2.8 mm.

== Distribution ==
This marine species occurs off the Philippines.
