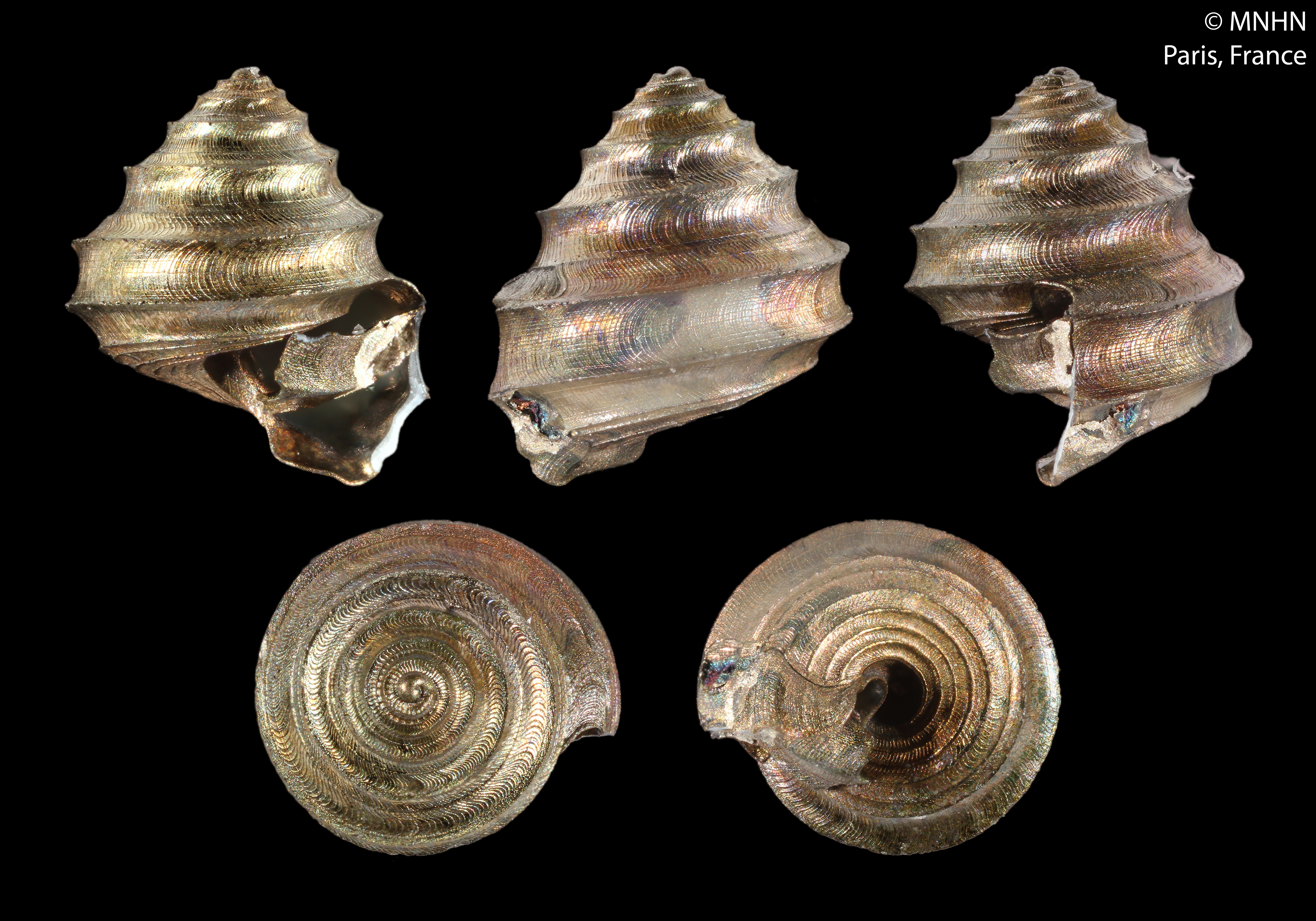
- Shell of Seguenzia wareni (holotype at MNHN, Paris)

Scientific classification
- Kingdom: Animalia
- Phylum: Mollusca
- Class: Gastropoda
- Subclass: Vetigastropoda
- Family: Seguenziidae
- Subfamily: Seguenziinae
- Genus: Seguenzia
- Species: S. wareni

Binomial name
- Seguenzia wareni Marshall, 1991

= Seguenzia wareni =

Species of gastropod

Seguenzia wareni is a species of extremely small deep water sea snail, a marine gastropod mollusk in the family Seguenziidae.

== Description ==
The length of the shell attains 2.8 mm.

== Distribution ==
This marine species occurs in the South Pacific Ocean off New Caledonia.
