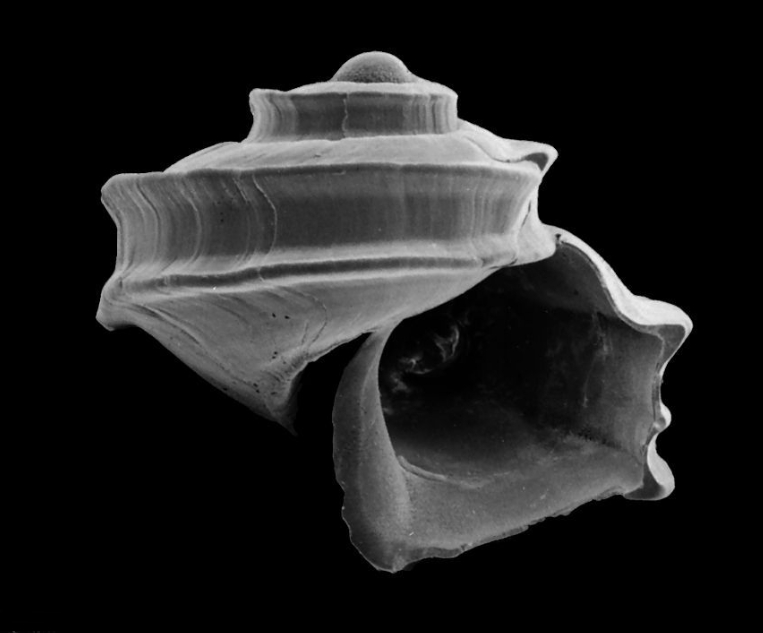
- Shell of Seguenziopsis bicorona (hlotype at Museum of New Zealand Te Papa Tongarewa)

Scientific classification
- Kingdom: Animalia
- Phylum: Mollusca
- Class: Gastropoda
- Subclass: Vetigastropoda
- Superfamily: Seguenzioidea
- Family: Seguenziidae
- Subfamily: Seguenziinae
- Genus: Seguenziopsis
- Species: S. bicorona

Binomial name
- Seguenziopsis bicorona Marshall, 1983

= Seguenziopsis bicorona =

Species of gastropod

Seguenziopsis bicorona is a species of very small deep water sea snail, a marine gastropod mollusk in the family Seguenziidae.

== Description ==
The nacreous, white shell is somewhat broader (2.45 mm) than high (2.1 mm). The thick shell has a narrow umbilicus.

Its functional group is Benthos.

It is a deposit feeder and a grazer.
