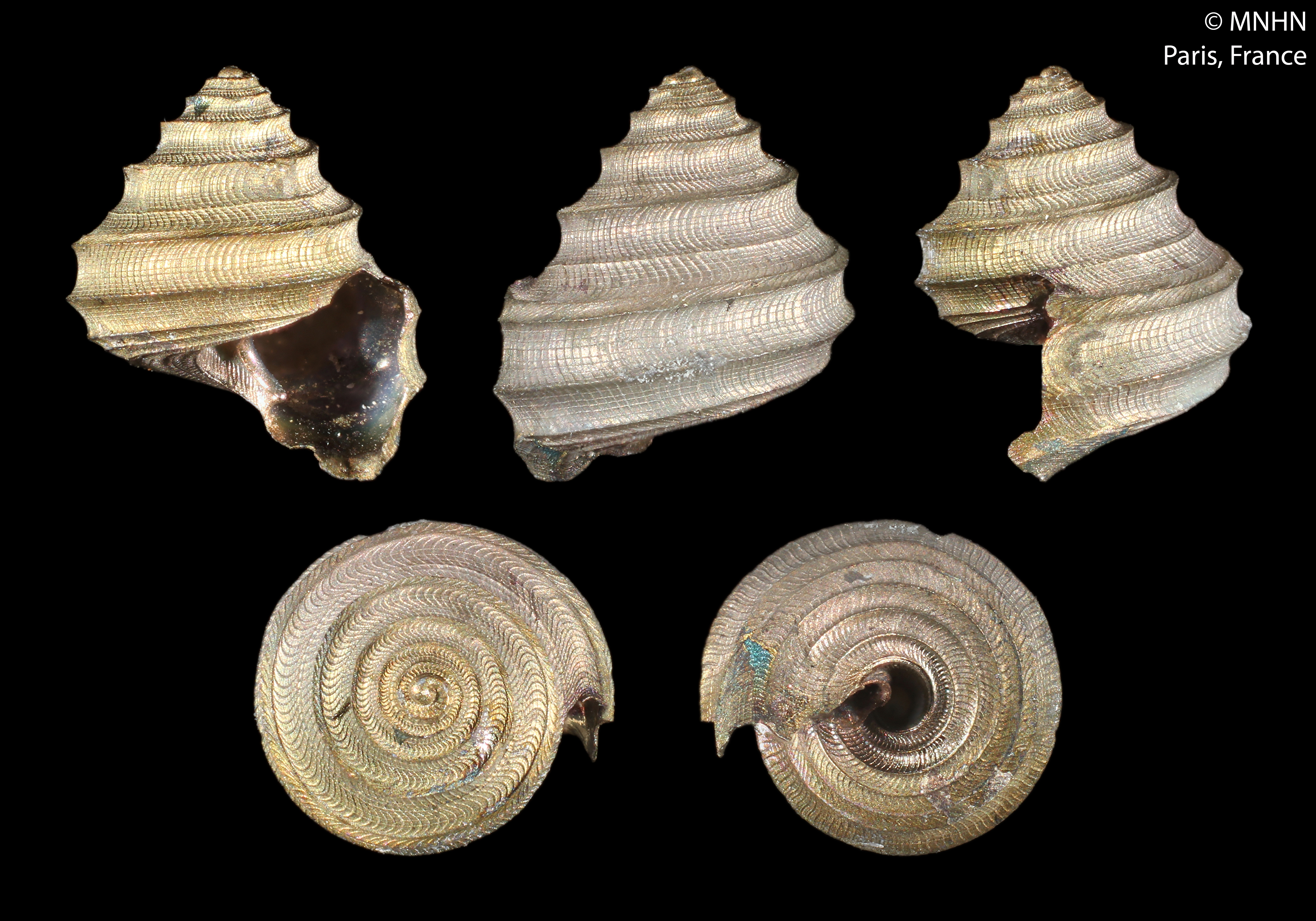
- Shell of Seguenzia richeri (holotype at MNHN, Paris)

Scientific classification
- Kingdom: Animalia
- Phylum: Mollusca
- Class: Gastropoda
- Subclass: Vetigastropoda
- Superfamily: Seguenzioidea
- Family: Seguenziidae
- Subfamily: Seguenziinae
- Genus: Seguenzia
- Species: S. richeri

Binomial name
- Seguenzia richeri Marshall, 1991

= Seguenzia richeri =

Species of gastropod

Seguenzia richeri is a species of extremely small deep water sea snail, which is a marine gastropod mollusk in the family Seguenziidae.

== Description ==
The length of the shell attains 3.55 mm. The species has been found 5 times, at sea surface temperatures ranging from 20 to 30 degrees celsius. Two samples have been found at a depth of 1000-2000 meters, and two have been found at 2000-3000 meters, and one has been found at a range of 3000-4000 meters. 2 of the 5 samples were found in 1987, the other three's dates are unknown. The species was named by B. A. Marshall in 1991.

== Distribution ==
This marine species occurs off New Caledonia.
