= Davisiana inquirenda =

Scientific classification
- Kingdom: Animalia
- Phylum: Mollusca
- Class: Gastropoda
- Subclass: Vetigastropoda
- Superfamily: Seguenzioidea
- Family: Seguenziidae
- Subfamily: Davisianinae
- Genus: Davisiana
- Species: D. inquirenda

Binomial name
- Davisiana inquirenda Egorova, 1972

Species of gastropod

Davisiana inquirenda is a species of extremely small deep water sea snail, a marine gastropod mollusk in the family Seguenziidae.
