= Seguenzia orientalis =

Scientific classification
- Kingdom: Animalia
- Phylum: Mollusca
- Class: Gastropoda
- Subclass: Vetigastropoda
- Superfamily: Seguenzioidea
- Family: Seguenziidae
- Subfamily: Seguenziinae
- Genus: Seguenzia
- Species: S. orientalis

Binomial name
- Seguenzia orientalis Thiele, 1925

Species of gastropod

Seguenzia orientalis is a species of extremely small deep water sea snail, a marine gastropod mollusk in the family Seguenziidae.
