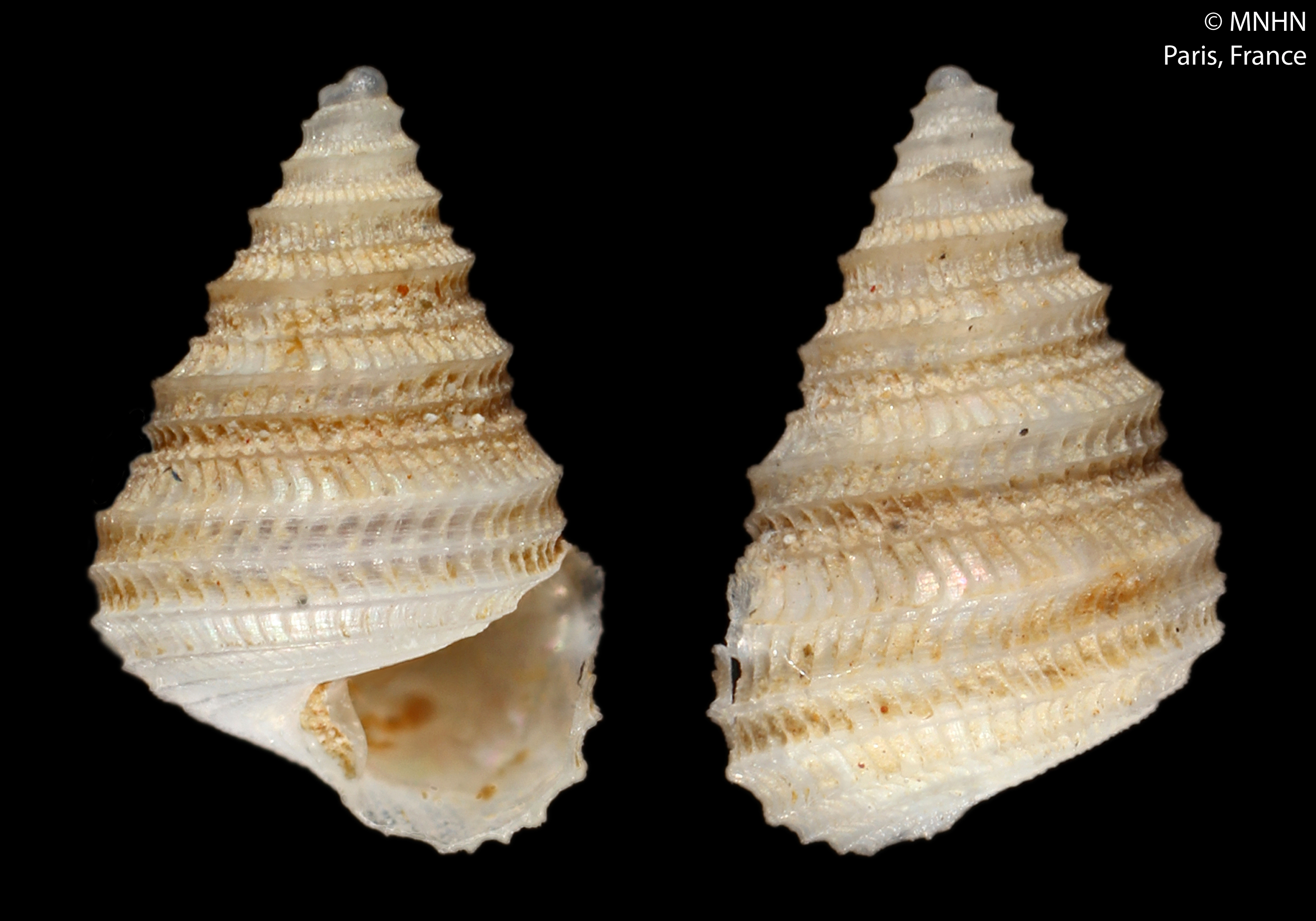
- Shell of Seguenzia triteia (holotype at MNHN, Paris)

Scientific classification
- Kingdom: Animalia
- Phylum: Mollusca
- Class: Gastropoda
- Subclass: Vetigastropoda
- Family: Seguenziidae
- Subfamily: Seguenziinae
- Genus: Seguenzia
- Species: S. triteia

Binomial name
- Seguenzia triteia Salvador, Cavallari & Simone, 2014

= Seguenzia triteia =

Species of gastropod

Seguenzia triteia is a species of very small, deep water sea snail, a marine gastropod mollusc in the family Seguenziidae.

== Description ==
The length of the shell attains 3.3 mm.

== Distribution ==
This species occurs in the Atlantic Ocean off South-east Brazil.
