= Sericogyra metallica =

Scientific classification
- Kingdom: Animalia
- Phylum: Mollusca
- Class: Gastropoda
- Subclass: Vetigastropoda
- Superfamily: Seguenzioidea
- Family: Seguenziidae
- Subfamily: Guttulinae
- Genus: Sericogyra
- Species: S. metallica

Binomial name
- Sericogyra metallica Marshall, 1988

Species of sea snail

Sericogyra metallica is a species of extremely small deep water sea snail, a marine gastropod mollusk in the family Seguenziidae.

== Distribution ==
This marine species occurs off the coast of New Zealand.
