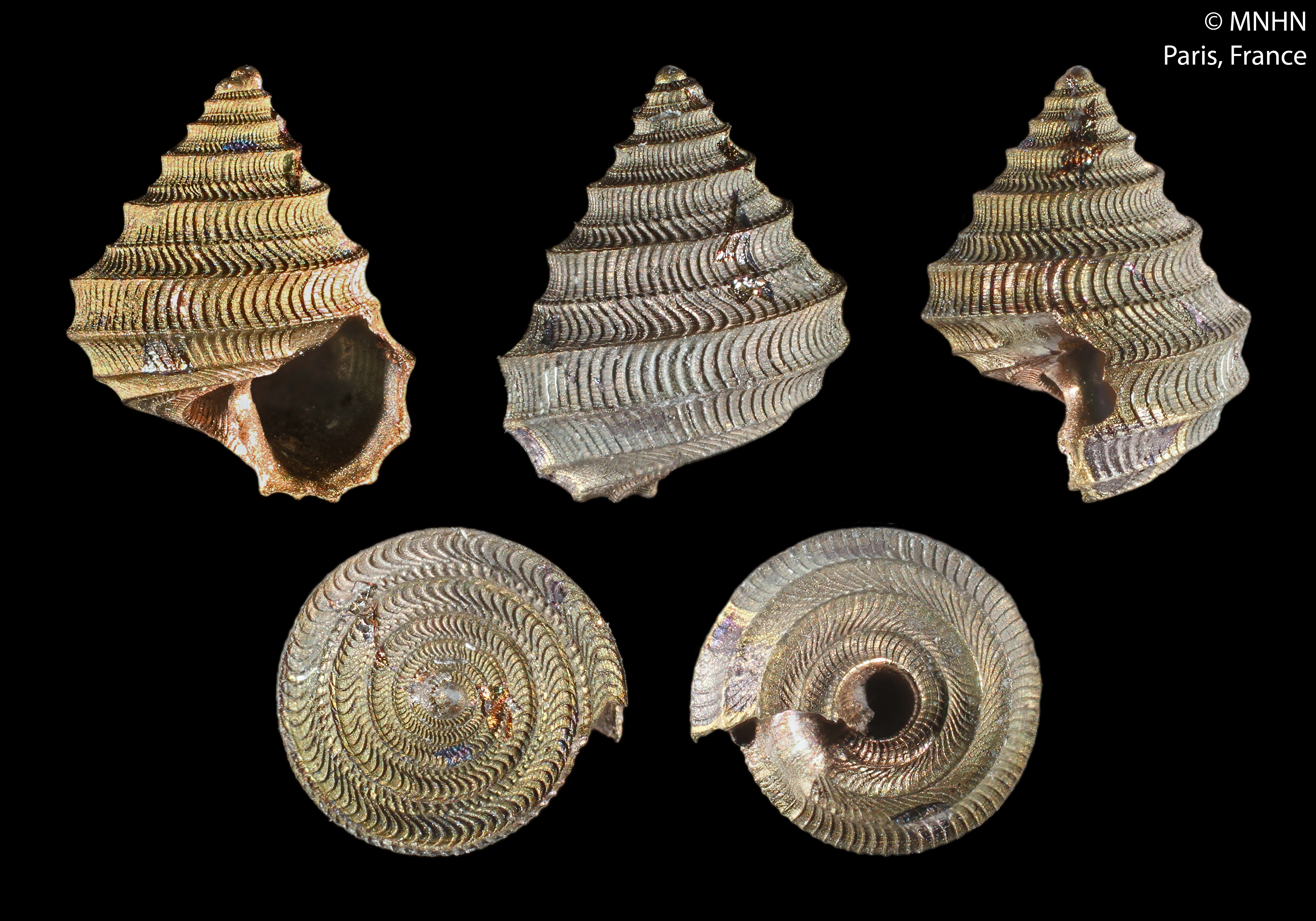
- Shell of Seguenzia emmeles (holotype at MNHN, Paris)

Scientific classification
- Kingdom: Animalia
- Phylum: Mollusca
- Class: Gastropoda
- Subclass: Vetigastropoda
- Superfamily: Seguenzioidea
- Family: Seguenziidae
- Subfamily: Seguenziinae
- Genus: Seguenzia
- Species: S. emmeles

Binomial name
- Seguenzia emmeles B. A. Marshall, 1991

= Seguenzia emmeles =

Species of gastropod

Seguenzia emmeles is a species of extremely small deep water sea snail, a marine gastropod mollusk in the family Seguenziidae.

== Description ==
The length of the shell attains 3.55 mm.

== Distribution ==
This marine species occurs on the Norfolk Ridge, off New Caledonia.
