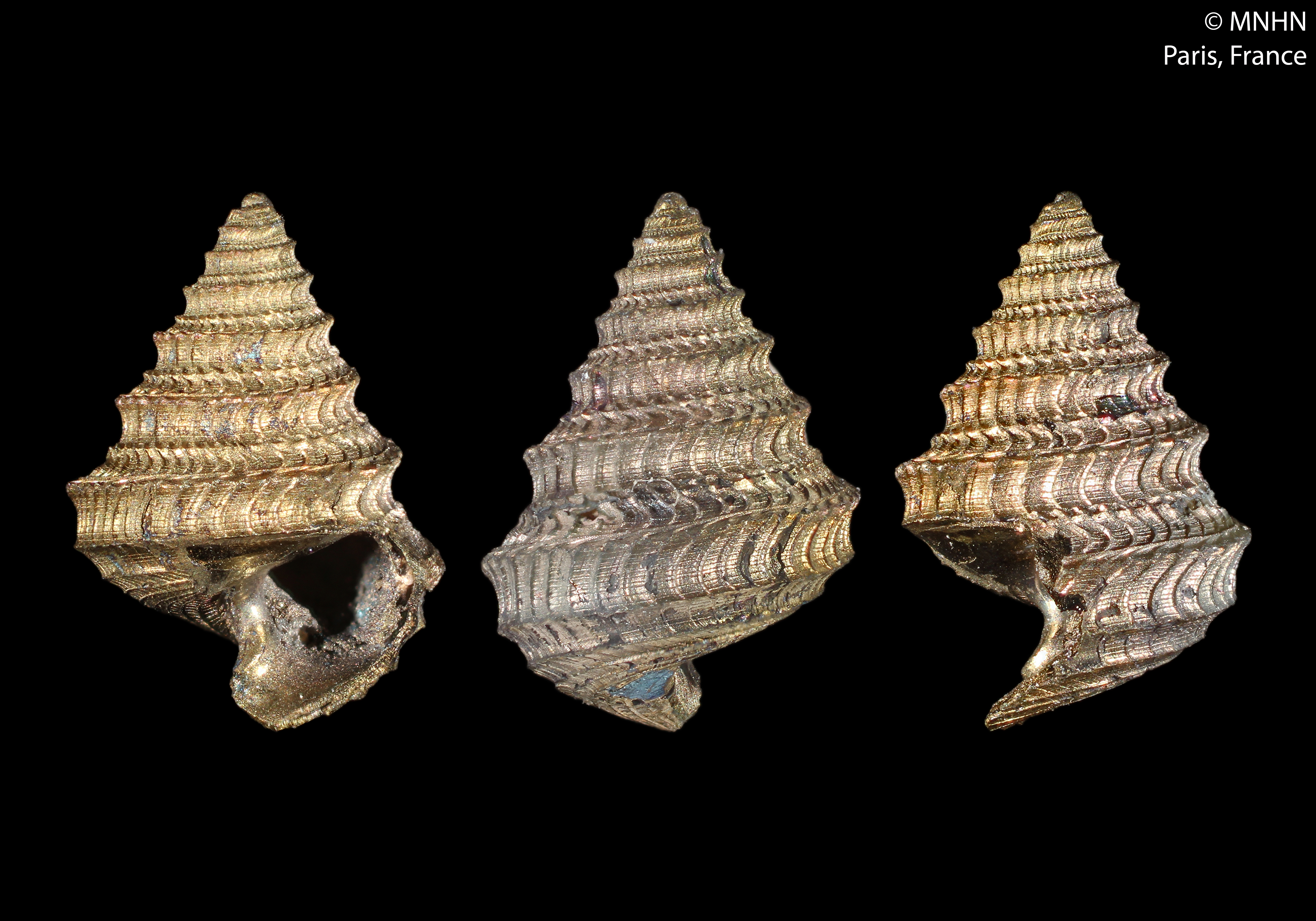
- Shell of Seguenzia levii (holotype at MNHN, Paris)

Scientific classification
- Kingdom: Animalia
- Phylum: Mollusca
- Class: Gastropoda
- Subclass: Vetigastropoda
- Family: Seguenziidae
- Subfamily: Seguenziinae
- Genus: Seguenzia
- Species: S. levii

Binomial name
- Seguenzia levii B. A. Marshall, 1991

= Seguenzia levii =

Species of gastropod

Seguenzia levii is a species of extremely small deep water sea snail, a marine gastropod mollusk in the family Seguenziidae.

== Description ==
The length of the shell can attain 5 mm. It is conical and white, with a thin outer shell. The original specimen was photographed in both holotype and paratype.

== Distribution ==
This marine species occurs off New Caledonia.
