= Halystes chimaera =

Scientific classification
- Kingdom: Animalia
- Phylum: Mollusca
- Class: Gastropoda
- Subclass: Vetigastropoda
- Superfamily: Seguenzioidea
- Family: Seguenziidae
- Subfamily: Seguenziinae
- Genus: Halystes
- Species: H. chimaera

Binomial name
- Halystes chimaera Marshall, 1988

Species of gastropod

Halystes chimaera is a species of extremely small deep water sea snail, a marine gastropod mollusk in the family Seguenziidae. It was described by B.A. Marshall in 1988 and is the sole species within the genus Halystes. It can be found in much of the southwest Pacific, inhabiting deep-sea environments.
