= Seguenzia conopia =

Scientific classification
- Kingdom: Animalia
- Phylum: Mollusca
- Class: Gastropoda
- Subclass: Vetigastropoda
- Superfamily: Seguenzioidea
- Family: Seguenziidae
- Subfamily: Seguenziinae
- Genus: Seguenzia
- Species: S. conopia

Binomial name
- Seguenzia conopia B. A. Marshall, 1983

Species of gastropod

Seguenzia conopia is a species of extremely small deep water sea snail, a marine gastropod mollusk in the family Seguenziidae.

== Description ==
The height of this translucent, nacreous, white shell attains 3.7 mm.

== Distribution ==
This marine species occurs off New Zealand in the Tasman Basin at a depth of about 1,800 m.
