= Oligomeria conoidea =

Scientific classification
- Kingdom: Animalia
- Phylum: Mollusca
- Class: Gastropoda
- Subclass: Vetigastropoda
- Superfamily: Seguenzioidea
- Family: Seguenziidae
- Subfamily: Davisianinae
- Genus: Oligomeria
- Species: O. conoidea

Binomial name
- Oligomeria conoidea Galkin & Golikov, 1985

Species of gastropod

Oligomeria conoidea is a species of extremely small deep water sea snail, a marine gastropod mollusk in the family Seguenziidae.

== Description ==
The height of the shell attains 5 mm.

== Distribution ==
This marine species occurs off the Kurile Islands, Russia.
