= Seguenzia hosyu =

Scientific classification
- Kingdom: Animalia
- Phylum: Mollusca
- Class: Gastropoda
- Subclass: Vetigastropoda
- Superfamily: Seguenzioidea
- Family: Seguenziidae
- Subfamily: Seguenziinae
- Genus: Seguenzia
- Species: S. hosyu

Binomial name
- Seguenzia hosyu Habe, 1953

Species of gastropod

Seguenzia hosyu is a species of extremely small deep water sea snail, a marine gastropod mollusk in the family Seguenziidae.

== Description ==
The height of the shell attains 3 mm.

== Distribution ==
This marine species occurs off Japan.
