= Seguenzia mirabilis =

Scientific classification
- Kingdom: Animalia
- Phylum: Mollusca
- Class: Gastropoda
- Subclass: Vetigastropoda
- Superfamily: Seguenzioidea
- Family: Seguenziidae
- Subfamily: Seguenziinae
- Genus: Seguenzia
- Species: S. mirabilis

Binomial name
- Seguenzia mirabilis Okutani, 1964

Species of gastropod

Seguenzia mirabilis is a species of extremely small deep water sea snail, a marine gastropod mollusk in the family Seguenziidae.

== Description ==
The length of the shell attains 4.5 mm.

== Distribution ==
This marine species occurs off Japan.
