= Seguenzia cervola =

Scientific classification
- Kingdom: Animalia
- Phylum: Mollusca
- Class: Gastropoda
- Subclass: Vetigastropoda
- Family: Seguenziidae
- Subfamily: Seguenziinae
- Genus: Seguenzia
- Species: S. cervola

Binomial name
- Seguenzia cervola Dall, 1919

Synonyms
- Seguenzia megaloconcha Rokop, 1972 ·

Species of gastropod

Seguenzia cervola is a species of extremely small deep-water sea snail, a marine gastropod mollusk in the family Seguenziidae.

== Description ==
(Original description by W.H. Dall) The height of the shell attains 4.5 mm. The white shell is small and slightly depressed. It has one small, smooth nuclear whorl and five subsequent whorls. These are flattened a little in front of a distinct suture. They are separated by a somewhat convex smooth fasciole from a thread-like keel above the periphery. In front of this is a wide, smooth interval. On the base of the shell are about a dozen spiral threads with wider interspaces, and very faint microscopic spiral striae are visible in all the interspaces under a lens. On the upper whorls, there is a small thread between the keel and the suture. Near the apex, they become obsolete. At the aperture, is a shallow sulcus between the keel and the suture and a smaller one at the middle of the base. There is a sharp notch below the end of the thin, arcuate projecting columella, behind which is a moderately large twisted umbilicus. The body shows no glaze. The base of the shell is conspicuously convex.

== Distribution ==
The type specimen of this marine species was found off the Coronado Islands, Baja California.
