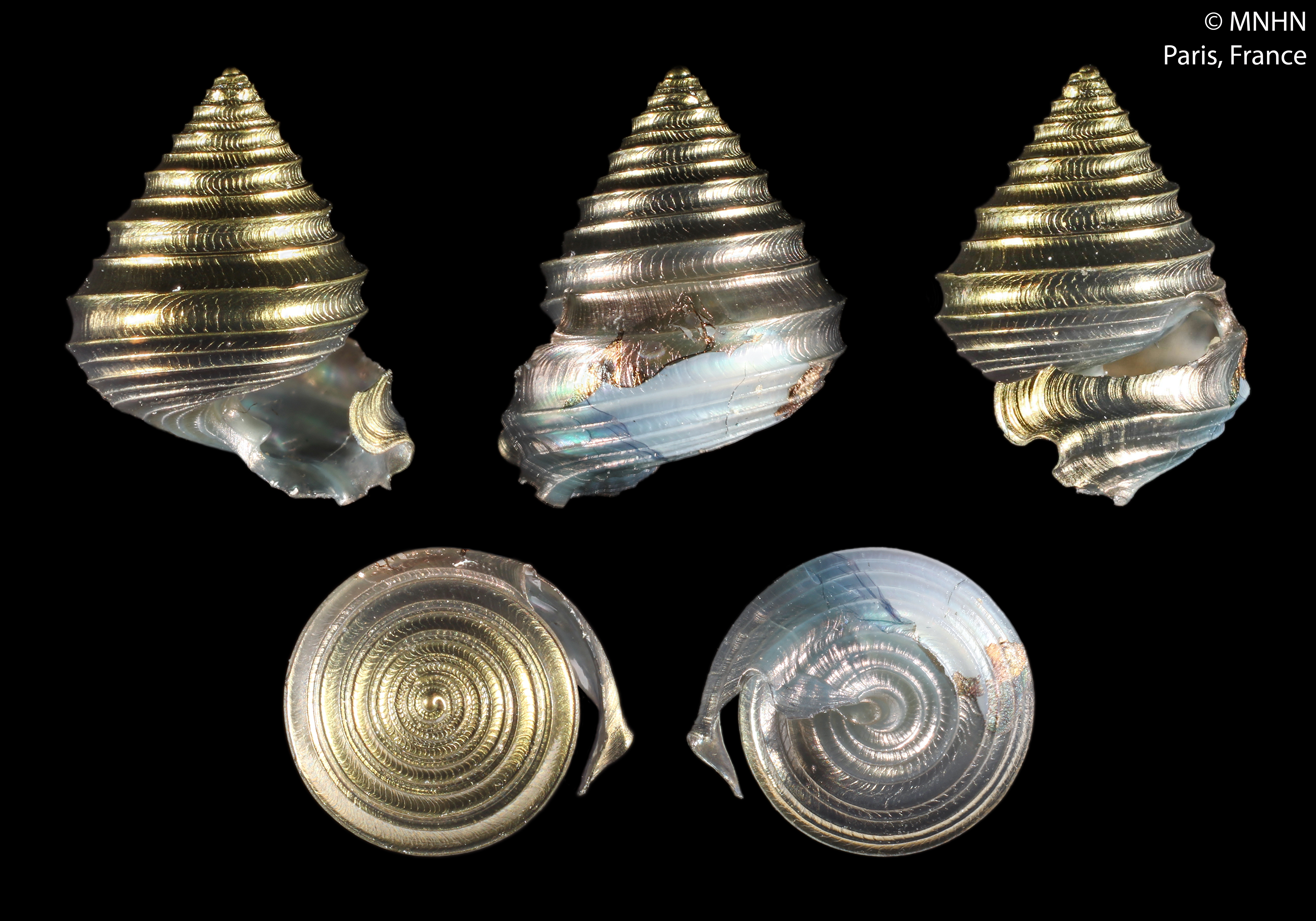
- Shell of Seguenzia chariessa (holotype at MNHN, Paris)

Scientific classification
- Kingdom: Animalia
- Phylum: Mollusca
- Class: Gastropoda
- Subclass: Vetigastropoda
- Family: Seguenziidae
- Subfamily: Seguenziinae
- Genus: Seguenzia
- Species: S. chariessa

Binomial name
- Seguenzia chariessa Marshall, 1991

= Seguenzia chariessa =

Species of gastropod

Seguenzia chariessa is a species of extremely small deep water sea snail, a marine gastropod mollusk in the family Seguenziidae.

== Distribution ==
This marine species occurs off New Caledonia.
