= Seguenzia occidentalis =

Scientific classification
- Kingdom: Animalia
- Phylum: Mollusca
- Class: Gastropoda
- Subclass: Vetigastropoda
- Superfamily: Seguenzioidea
- Family: Seguenziidae
- Subfamily: Seguenziinae
- Genus: Seguenzia
- Species: S. occidentalis

Binomial name
- Seguenzia occidentalis Dall, 1908

Species of gastropod

Seguenzia occidentalis is a species of extremely small deep water sea snail, a marine gastropod mollusk in the family Seguenziidae.

== Distribution ==
The type species was found in the Pacific Ocean off Acapulco, Mexico at a depth of 1,200 m.
