= Seguenzia hapala =

Scientific classification
- Kingdom: Animalia
- Phylum: Mollusca
- Class: Gastropoda
- Subclass: Vetigastropoda
- Family: Seguenziidae
- Genus: Seguenzia
- Species: S. hapala

Binomial name
- Seguenzia hapala Woodring, 1928

Synonyms
- Seguenzia monocingulata auct. non Seguenza, 1876

Species of gastropod

Seguenzia hapala is a species of sea snail, a marine gastropod mollusk in the family Seguenziidae.

== Description ==
The height of the shell attains 3 mm. The species is a deitrivore.

== Distribution ==
This marine species occurs in the Gulf of Mexico, the Caribbean Sea, the Lesser Antilles; in the Atlantic Ocean off Florida, and Northern Brazil at depths between 80 m and 150 m. The species is tropical and most commonly found on soft substrates; with a range of 25°N - 30°S, 82°E - 50°E.
