= Seguenzia textilis =

Scientific classification
- Kingdom: Animalia
- Phylum: Mollusca
- Class: Gastropoda
- Subclass: Vetigastropoda
- Superfamily: Seguenzioidea
- Family: Seguenziidae
- Subfamily: Seguenziinae
- Genus: Seguenzia
- Species: S. textilis

Binomial name
- Seguenzia textilis B. A. Marshall, 1983

Species of gastropod

Seguenzia textilis, commonly known as a marine snail, is a species of extremely small deep water sea snail, a marine gastropod mollusk in the family Seguenziidae.

== Description ==
The height of their translucent, nacreous, white shell attains 3.5 mm.

== Distribution ==
This marine species occurs off New Zealand in the Tasman Basin and off the Aldermen Islands at depths between 570 m and 846 m.

== Diet ==
The sea snail feeds on Foraminifera.

== History ==
Seguenzia textilis was collected by RV Tangaroa in 1981 but was first identified by Dr Bruce Marshall in 2002.
