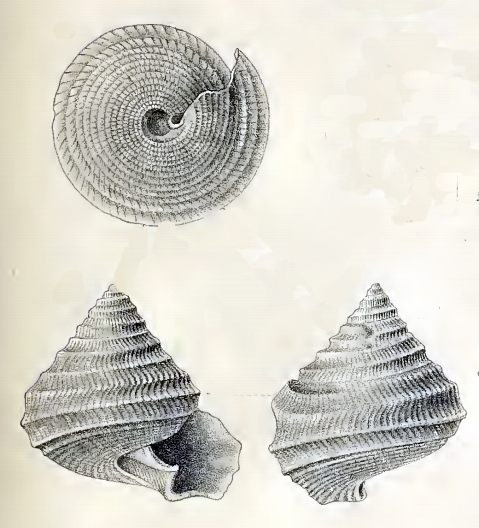
- Original drawing with three views of a shell of Seguenzia dautzenbergi

Scientific classification
- Kingdom: Animalia
- Phylum: Mollusca
- Class: Gastropoda
- Subclass: Vetigastropoda
- Superfamily: Seguenzioidea
- Family: Seguenziidae
- Subfamily: Seguenziinae
- Genus: Seguenzia
- Species: S. dautzenbergi

Binomial name
- Seguenzia dautzenbergi Schepman, 1909

= Seguenzia dautzenbergi =

Species of gastropod

Seguenzia dautzenbergi is a species of extremely small deep water sea snail, a marine gastropod mollusk in the family Seguenziidae.

== Description ==
(Original description by M. Schepman) The height of this whitish-yellow shell attains 4¼ mm. The rather small, umbilicate shell has a spire forming a short gradated cone. The shell contains 7 whorls of which the uppermost forms the smooth nucleus, followed by about 2 whorls with a submedian keel and displaying a cancellated appearance by the intercrossing of subequal spiral and radiating riblets. The other whorls have each 3 spirals, of which the uppermost runs at a little distance from the suture. The next one is the strongest. It renders the whorls carinate about halfway, and a third which seems to run just in the rather conspicuous suture. Moreover, the interstices have more or less numerous fine spirals (numerous in the type, where they quite fill the spaces). This spiral sculpture is crossed by radiating riblets, running straight in an oblique direction, from the suture to the upper spiral, where they form small crenulations. In the next interstice they are concave and at last convex towards the basal liration. The body whorl is rounded, with a strong peripheral keel, being the basal one of the upper whorls, and a convex base. There is another spiral at some distance from the peripheral keel, and 12 basal spirals of which three more spaced ones, at a larger distance from the subperipheral spiral, and 9 more central spirals, which are flatter, at subequal distances, the innermost bordering the umbilicus. These spirals are connected by small radiating riblets in the interstices. Moreover, these interstices are filled with similar finer spirals as in the spire. The funnel-shaped umbilicus is moderately wide, and probably pervious. Its wall shows fine radiating striae and a conspicuous spiral groove, terminating in a strong dentiform projection on the columellar margin. The aperture is moderately large, irregular in shape, with a rather deep sinus at the suture (about 1½ mm, behind the most projecting part of the outer margin). It is rounded behind, with an upturned margin. The outer margin is thin, angular by the terminations of the spiral keels. The columellar margin is strongly excavated above. This excavation is bordered by the strong toothlike projection formed at the end of the umbilical groove. It has the appearance of a compressed fold. Below this tooth, the columellar margin runs obliquely back and terminates in a projecting point where it joins the slightly curved basal margin. The interior is nacreous.

== Distribution ==
This marine species occurs in the Makassar Strait, the Banda Sea and the Ceram Sea.
