= Seguenzia fulgida =

Scientific classification
- Kingdom: Animalia
- Phylum: Mollusca
- Class: Gastropoda
- Subclass: Vetigastropoda
- Superfamily: Seguenzioidea
- Family: Seguenziidae
- Subfamily: Seguenziinae
- Genus: Seguenzia
- Species: S. fulgida

Binomial name
- Seguenzia fulgida B. A. Marshall, 1983

Species of gastropod

Seguenzia fulgida is a species of extremely small deep water sea snail, a marine gastropod mollusk in the family Seguenziidae.

== Description ==
The length of the shell attains 6.1 mm, making the shell longer than broad (4.4 mm). It is uniformly translucent white,

== Distribution ==
This marine species occurs off New Zealand in the Tasman Basin at a depth of about 1,800 m.
