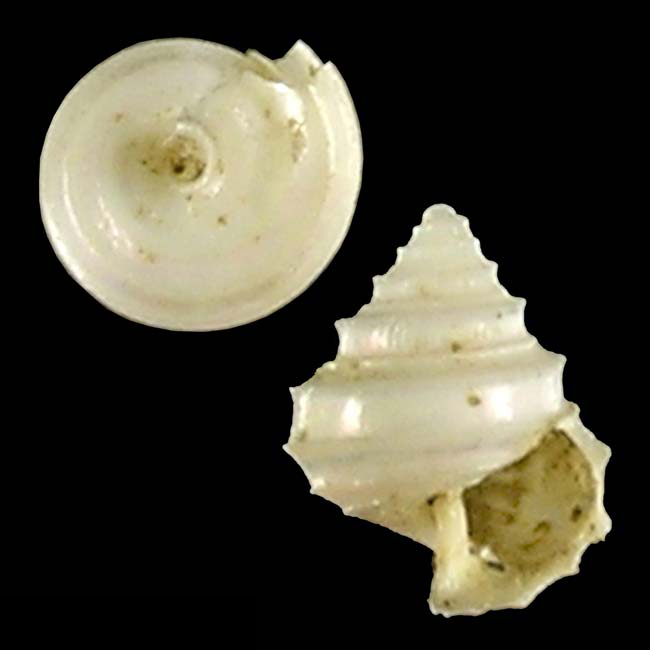

Scientific classification
- Kingdom: Animalia
- Phylum: Mollusca
- Class: Gastropoda
- Subclass: Vetigastropoda
- Family: Seguenziidae
- Genus: Seguenzia
- Species: S. balicasagensis

Binomial name
- Seguenzia balicasagensis Poppe, Tagaro & Dekker, 2006

= Seguenzia balicasagensis =

Species of gastropod

Seguenzia balicasagensis is a species of sea snail, a marine gastropod mollusk in the family Seguenziidae.

== Description ==
The height of the shell attains 2.5 mm.

== Distribution ==
This marine species occurs off the Philippines.
