= Seguenzia floridana =

Scientific classification
- Kingdom: Animalia
- Phylum: Mollusca
- Class: Gastropoda
- Subclass: Vetigastropoda
- Superfamily: Seguenzioidea
- Family: Seguenziidae
- Subfamily: Seguenziinae
- Genus: Seguenzia
- Species: S. floridana

Binomial name
- Seguenzia floridana Dall, 1927

Synonyms
- Seguenzia florida Dall, 1927 (misspelling)

Species of gastropod

Seguenzia floridana is a species of extremely small deep water sea snail, a marine gastropod mollusk in the family Seguenziidae.

== Description ==
The height of the shell attains 5 mm.

== Distribution ==
This species occurs in the Atlantic Ocean off Georgia and Florida.
