= Seguenzia antarctica =

Scientific classification
- Kingdom: Animalia
- Phylum: Mollusca
- Class: Gastropoda
- Subclass: Vetigastropoda
- Family: Seguenziidae
- Genus: Seguenzia
- Species: S. antarctica

Binomial name
- Seguenzia antarctica Thiele, 1925

Species of gastropod

Seguenzia antarctica is a species of sea snail, a marine gastropod mollusk in the family Seguenziidae.

== Description ==
The height of the shell attains 5 mm (0.20 in).

== Distribution ==
This species occurs in the Weddell Sea, Antarctica.
