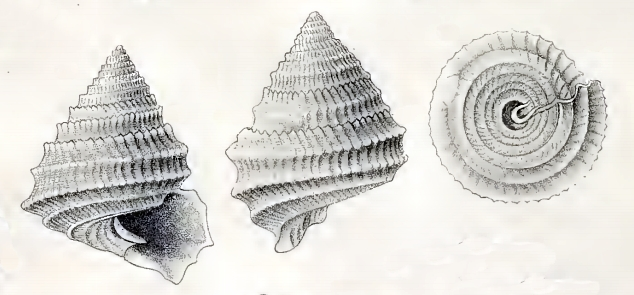
- Original drawing with three views of a shell of Seguenzia costulifera

Scientific classification
- Kingdom: Animalia
- Phylum: Mollusca
- Class: Gastropoda
- Subclass: Vetigastropoda
- Superfamily: Seguenzioidea
- Family: Seguenziidae
- Subfamily: Seguenziinae
- Genus: Seguenzia
- Species: S. costulifera

Binomial name
- Seguenzia costulifera Schepman, 1909

= Seguenzia costulifera =

Species of gastropod

Seguenzia costulifera is a species of extremely small deep water sea snail, a marine gastropod mollusk in the family Seguenziidae.

== Description ==
(Original description by M. Schepman) The height of the yellowish white shell attains 5 mm. The rather small shell has a conoidal shape, with a high spire and convex base. It is scalar and rimate. It contains about 7 whorls of which the upper one forms the smooth, bulbous nucleus, followed by 2 whorls, which have a strong median keel and traces of a third one below the suture. These lirations become more conspicuous on the lower whorls, which have the median keel, another one just below the suture and in some parts traces of a third one, running entirely or partly in the deep suture. Moreover, the whole shell is covered with microscopic, close-set, spiral threads. This sculpture is crossed by conspicuous riblets, fainter on the upper whorls, very strong on the lower ones, and by very fine growth-striae. The riblets are not close-set and form conspicuous spines below the suture of the lower whorls. When they cross the upper spiral, they run obliquely from behind and are curved in the lower part of the space between the upper and median keel, being concave below. Below this median keel they are convex. On the body whorl runs a third keel, which is crenulated by the ribs. This is also the case with the median keel, though not so strong;.aA some distance from the third keel a fourth one makes its appearance, this is a little fainter and less crenulate, the riblets between it and the third keel being also weaker. The interspaces of the keels described above are conspicuously concave. From the fourth keel until the centre run 5 spirals, of which the distal one at a considerable distance from the 4th keel. The innermost borders the umbilicus. These spirals are narrow, cord-like, with large interspaces, crossed by riblets in very various direction. The umbilicus is rather large, but nearly closed by the columellar margin, leaving only a fissure. The aperture is incomplete, a rather broad but not deep fissure at the upper part, rounded and turned up behind. The shape of the aperture is subquadrangular, irregular by the terminations of the keels. The columellar margin is expanded towards the left, formed by a deep, rounded sinus above and another narrower one below, with a strong tooth between them. This tooth is strongly compressed, as if formed by pinching the columellar margin.

== Distribution ==
This marine species occurs off Sulawesi, Indonesia.
