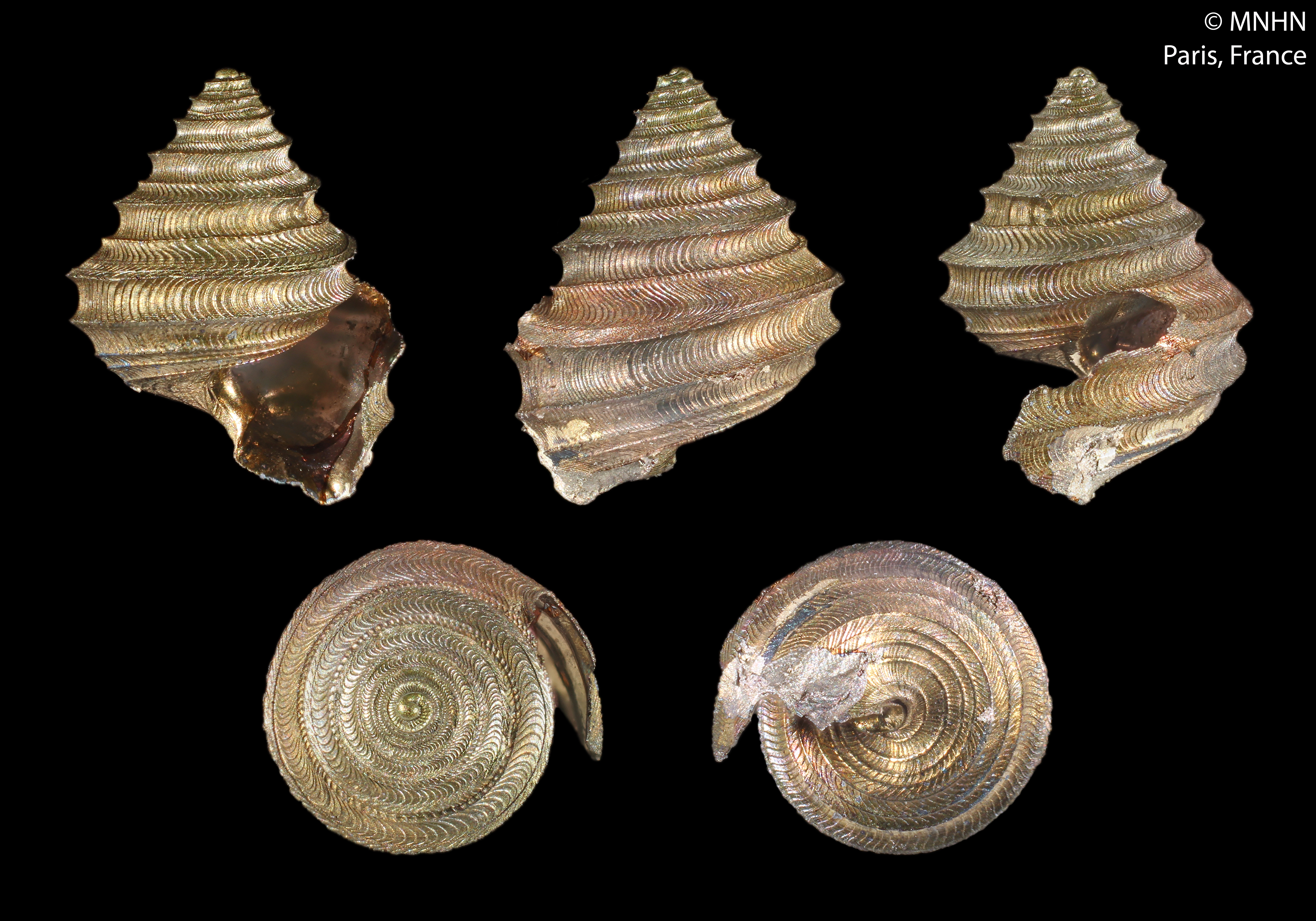
- Shell of Seguenzia praeceps (holotype at MNHN, Paris)

Scientific classification
- Kingdom: Animalia
- Phylum: Mollusca
- Class: Gastropoda
- Subclass: Vetigastropoda
- Family: Seguenziidae
- Subfamily: Seguenziinae
- Genus: Seguenzia
- Species: S. praeceps

Binomial name
- Seguenzia praeceps Marshall, 1991

= Seguenzia praeceps =

Species of gastropod

Seguenzia praeceps is a species of extremely small deep water sea snail, a marine gastropod mollusk in the family Seguenziidae.

== Derscription ==
The length of the shell attains 4.15 mm.

== Distribution ==
This marine species occurs off New Caledonia and the Loyalty Islands.
