= Seguenzia lineata =

Scientific classification
- Kingdom: Animalia
- Phylum: Mollusca
- Class: Gastropoda
- Subclass: Vetigastropoda
- Superfamily: Seguenzioidea
- Family: Seguenziidae
- Subfamily: Seguenziinae
- Genus: Seguenzia
- Species: S. lineata

Binomial name
- Seguenzia lineata Watson, 1879

Synonyms
- Seguenzia formosa var. lineata Watson, 1879

Species of gastropod

Seguenzia lineata is a species of extremely small deep water sea snail, a marine gastropod mollusk in the family Seguenziidae.

== Description ==
The height of the shell can reach up to 6mm.

== Distribution ==
This species occurs in the Caribbean Sea off Yucatan, Mexico, and in the Atlantic Ocean off Brazil at depths between 640 m and 1234 m.
