= Seguenzia matara =

Scientific classification
- Kingdom: Animalia
- Phylum: Mollusca
- Class: Gastropoda
- Subclass: Vetigastropoda
- Superfamily: Seguenzioidea
- Family: Seguenziidae
- Subfamily: Seguenziinae
- Genus: Seguenzia
- Species: S. matara

Binomial name
- Seguenzia matara B. A. Marshall, 1988

Species of gastropod

Seguenzia matara is a species of extremely small deep water sea snail, a marine gastropod mollusk in the family Seguenziidae.

== Description ==
The white, nacreous shell is broader (3.9 mm) than high (3.8 mm).

== Distribution ==
This marine species occurs off South Island, New Zealand at depths between 750 m and 1029 m.
