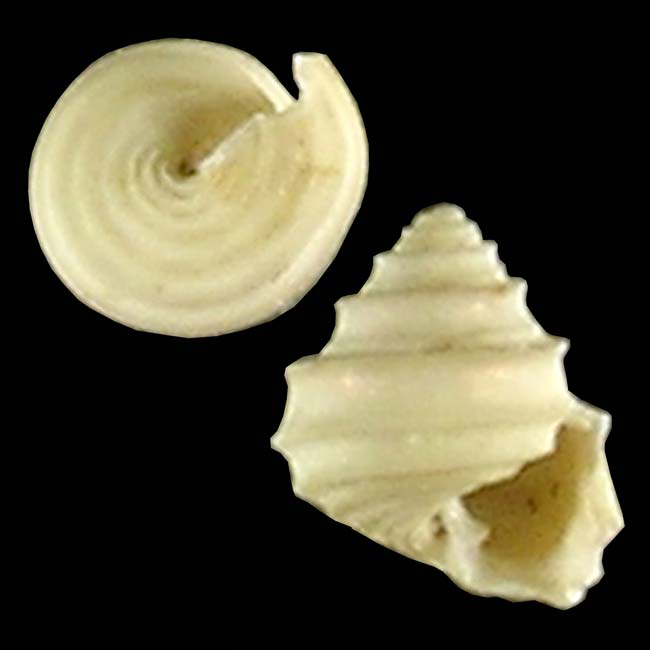

Scientific classification
- Kingdom: Animalia
- Phylum: Mollusca
- Class: Gastropoda
- Subclass: Vetigastropoda
- Family: Seguenziidae
- Genus: Seguenzia
- Species: S. keikoae

Binomial name
- Seguenzia keikoae Poppe, Tagaro & Dekker, 2006

= Seguenzia keikoae =

Species of gastropod

Seguenzia keikoae is a species of sea snail, a marine gastropod mollusk in the family Seguenziidae.

== Description ==
The size of the shell varies between 2 mm and 2.5 mm.

== Distribution ==
This marine species occurs off the Philippines.
