= Seguenzia compta =

Scientific classification
- Kingdom: Animalia
- Phylum: Mollusca
- Class: Gastropoda
- Subclass: Vetigastropoda
- Superfamily: Seguenzioidea
- Family: Seguenziidae
- Subfamily: Seguenziinae
- Genus: Seguenzia
- Species: S. compta

Binomial name
- Seguenzia compta B. A. Marshall, 1983

Species of gastropod

Seguenzia compta is a species of extremely small deep water sea snail, a marine gastropod mollusk in the family Seguenziidae.

== Description ==
The translucent and nacreous white shell is usually up to 6.8 mm wide and 6.5 mm high.

== Distribution ==
It occurs off New Zealand in the Bounty Trough at a depth of 1,386 m.
