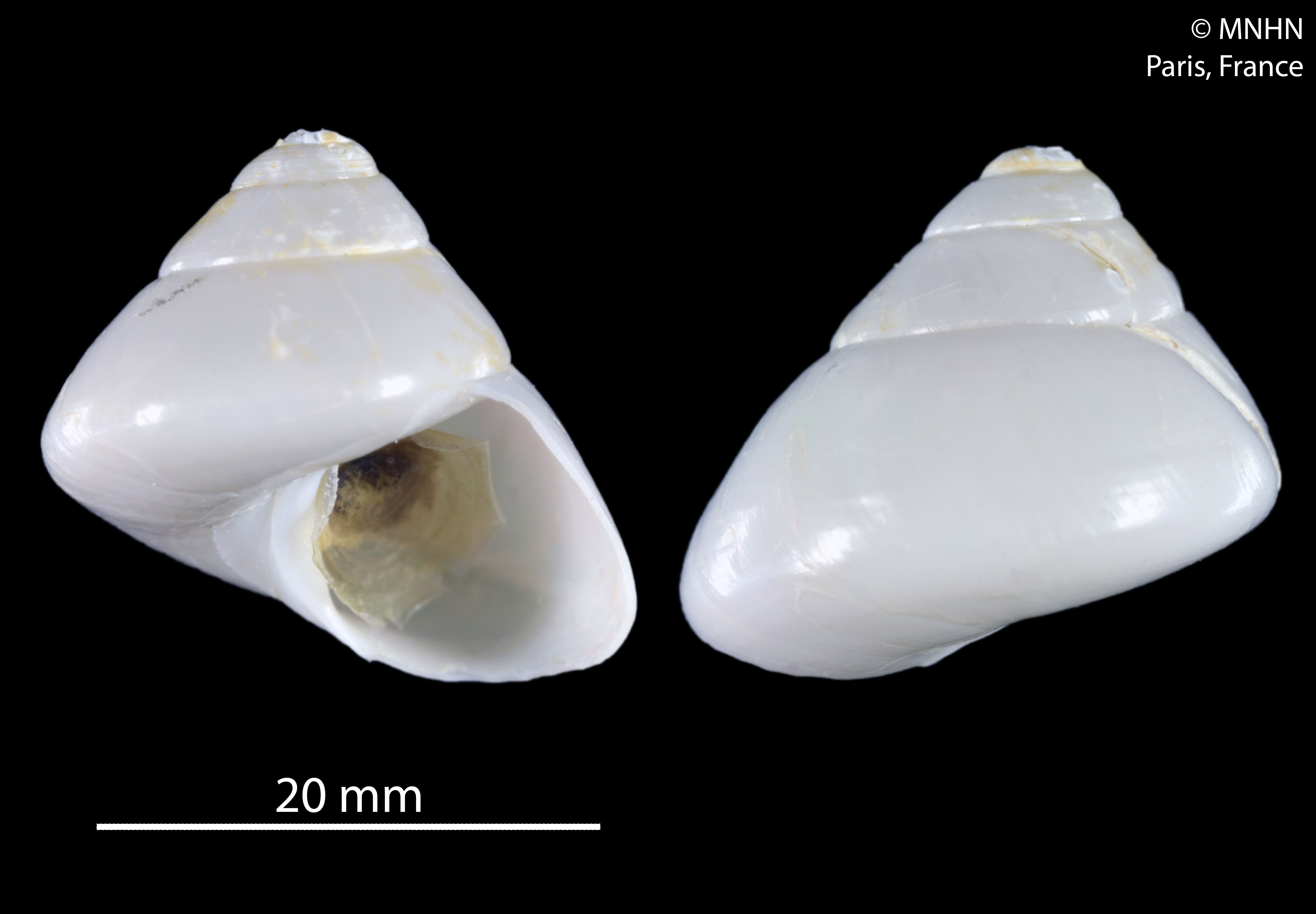
- shell of Bathymargarites symplector (paratype at MNHN, Paris)

Conservation status
- Near Threatened (IUCN 3.1)

Scientific classification
- Kingdom: Animalia
- Phylum: Mollusca
- Class: Gastropoda
- Subclass: Vetigastropoda
- Superfamily: Seguenzioidea
- Family: Seguenziidae
- Genus: Bathymargarites
- Species: B. symplector

Binomial name
- Bathymargarites symplector Warén & Bouchet, 1989

= Bathymargarites symplector =

Species of gastropod

Bathymargarites symplector is a species of extremely small deep water sea snail, a marine gastropod mollusk in the family Seguenziidae.
