= Seguenzia chelina =

Scientific classification
- Kingdom: Animalia
- Phylum: Mollusca
- Class: Gastropoda
- Subclass: Vetigastropoda
- Superfamily: Seguenzioidea
- Family: Seguenziidae
- Subfamily: Seguenziinae
- Genus: Seguenzia
- Species: S. chelina

Binomial name
- Seguenzia chelina B. A. Marshall, 1983

Species of gastropod

Seguenzia chelina is a species of extremely small deep water sea snail, a marine gastropod mollusk in the family Seguenziidae.

== Description ==
The height of the translucent nacreous, white shell attains 3 mm.

== Distribution ==
This marine species occurs off New Zealand in the Tasman Basin at a depth of about 1,000 m.
