= Seguenzia soyoae =

Scientific classification
- Kingdom: Animalia
- Phylum: Mollusca
- Class: Gastropoda
- Subclass: Vetigastropoda
- Superfamily: Seguenzioidea
- Family: Seguenziidae
- Subfamily: Seguenziinae
- Genus: Seguenzia
- Species: S. soyoae

Binomial name
- Seguenzia soyoae (Okutani, 1964)

Species of gastropod

Seguenzia soyoae is a species of extremely small deep water sea snail, a marine gastropod mollusk in the family Seguenziidae.
