= Sericogyra periglenes =

Scientific classification
- Kingdom: Animalia
- Phylum: Mollusca
- Class: Gastropoda
- Subclass: Vetigastropoda
- Superfamily: Seguenzioidea
- Family: Seguenziidae
- Subfamily: Guttulinae
- Genus: Sericogyra
- Species: S. periglenes

Binomial name
- Sericogyra periglenes Marshall, 1988

Species of gastropod

Sericogyra periglenes is a species of extremely small deep water sea snail, a marine gastropod mollusk in the family Seguenziidae.

== Distribution ==
This marine species occurs off New Zealand.
