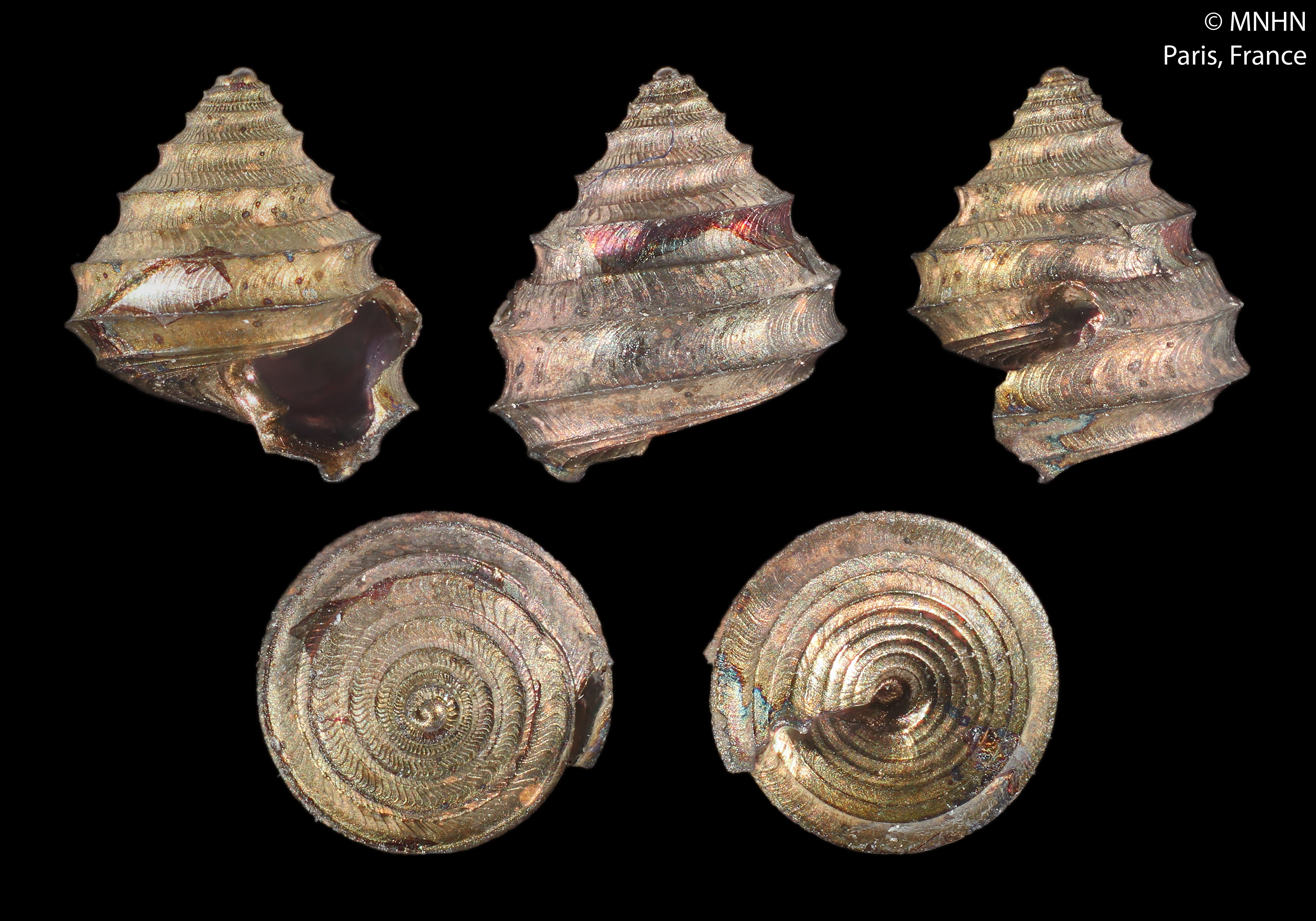
- Shell of Seguenzia metivieri (holotype at MNHN? Paris)

Scientific classification
- Kingdom: Animalia
- Phylum: Mollusca
- Class: Gastropoda
- Subclass: Vetigastropoda
- Family: Seguenziidae
- Subfamily: Seguenziinae
- Genus: Seguenzia
- Species: S. metivieri

Binomial name
- Seguenzia metivieri B. A. Marshall, 1991

= Seguenzia metivieri =

Species of gastropod

Seguenzia metivieri is a species of extremely small deep water sea snail, a marine gastropod mollusk in the family Seguenziidae.

== Description ==
The height of the shell attains 3 mm.

== Distribution ==
This marine species occurs off New Caledonia.
