= Halystes =

Scientific classification
- Kingdom: Animalia
- Phylum: Mollusca
- Class: Gastropoda
- Subclass: Vetigastropoda
- Superfamily: Seguenzioidea
- Family: Seguenziidae
- Subfamily: Seguenziinae
- Genus: Halystes; Marshall, 1988

Genus of gastropods

Halystes is a genus of extremely small deep water sea snails, marine gastropod mollusks in the family Seguenziidae.

== Species ==
Species within the genus Halystes include:

- Halystes chimaera Marshall, 1988
