= Seguenziopsis =

Scientific classification
- Kingdom: Animalia
- Phylum: Mollusca
- Class: Gastropoda
- Subclass: Vetigastropoda
- Family: Seguenziidae
- Subfamily: Seguenziinae
- Genus: Seguenziopsis; Marshall, 1983

Type species
- Seguenziopsis bicorona Marshall, 1983

Genus of gastropods

Seguenziopsis is a genus of minute sea snails, marine gastropod mollusks or micromollusks in the family Seguenziidae.

The name Seguenziopsisis derived from Seguenzia and the Ancient Greek word opsis (= appearance).

== Species ==
Species within the genus Seguenziopsis include:

- Seguenziopsis bicorona Marshall, 1983
