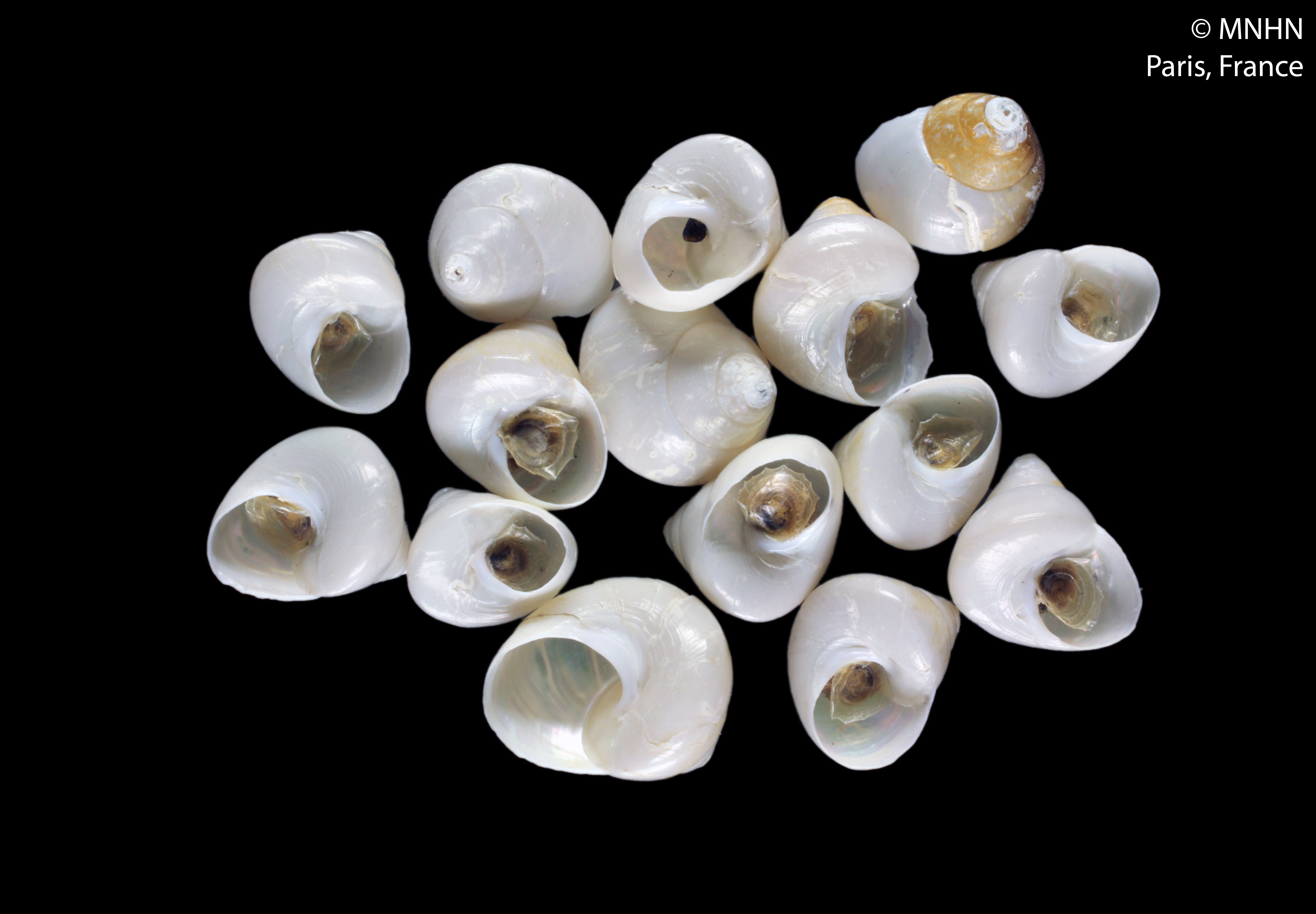
- Shells of Bathymargarites symplector (paratypes at MNHN, Paris)

Scientific classification
- Kingdom: Animalia
- Phylum: Mollusca
- Class: Gastropoda
- Subclass: Vetigastropoda
- Superfamily: Seguenzioidea
- Family: Seguenziidae
- Genus: Bathymargarites; Warén & Bouchet, 1989

Type species
- Bathymargarites symplector Warén & Bouchet, 1989

= Bathymargarites =

Genus of gastropods

Bathymargarites is a genus of extremely small deep water sea snails, marine gastropod mollusks in the family Seguenziidae.

== Species ==
Species within the genus Bathymargarites include:

- Bathymargarites symplector Warén & Bouchet, 1989
