= Seguenzia stephanica =

Scientific classification
- Kingdom: Animalia
- Phylum: Mollusca
- Class: Gastropoda
- Subclass: Vetigastropoda
- Family: Seguenziidae
- Subfamily: Seguenziinae
- Genus: Seguenzia
- Species: S. stephanica

Binomial name
- Seguenzia stephanica Dall, 1908

Synonyms
- Seguenzia caliana Dall, 1919 · unaccepted; Seguenzia certoma Dall, 1919

Species of gastropod

Seguenzia stephanica is a species of extremely small deep water sea snail, a marine gastropod mollusk in the family Seguenziidae.

== Description ==
(Original description of Seguenzia caliana by W.H. Dall) "The shell is small, its height attains 4.5 mm and its diameter is 3.2 mm. The white shell is elevated, trochiform, with a minute glassy smooth nucleus and about five subsequent whorls. The suture is obscure, and laid on the peripheral keel. On the spire there is a single sharp prominent keel somewhat behind the central line between the sutures, and on the body whorl is a similar peripheral keel with a wide excavated space on each side of it, the space behind the periphery wider. The base of the shell shows seven rather close-set squarish cords, those nearer the axis most adjacent to each other. The axial sculpture consists of low thin sharp lamellae with wider interspaces, over riding the peripheral keel on the spire but not on the body whorl. They are prominent in the interspaces behind the base, retractively arcuate in the posterior interspace, and protractively arcuate in the others. They do not invade the somewhat flattish base. The aperture has a very deep sulcus next to the suture. The outer lip in front of it is much produced, a feeble sulcus at the middle of the base. In front of the arcuate columella there is a smaller rounded indentation. Behind the columella there is a deep groove ending in a minutely perforate umbilicus. The body has no perceptible glaze."

(Original description of Seguenzia certoma by W.H. Dall) "The white, trochiform shell is small, its height attains 5 mm and it is 3.5 mm wide. It has a minute, smooth globular nucleus and seven subsequent strongly sculptured whorls. The suture is obscure. The spiral sculpture consists of a small, closely beaded thread at the summit of the whorl, separated from a low, sharp carina by a wider, excavated interspace, and the latter from a more prominent peripheral carina by a still wider space. On the base of the shell there are three sharp threads followed by three lower rounded threads, which approach the columella. The axial sculpture consists of fine, even, arcuate wrinkles, which, except where they bead the posterior thread, are chiefly visible in the interspaces. The suture is laid on the peripheral thread. Between it and the outer lip at the aperture there is a very deep sulcus. The outer lip is much produced and its edge modified by the external sculpture, so that there is a sulcus at the end of the peripheral keel, another one at the middle of the base, and still another at the base of the columella, which is arcuate and produced like a small plait. The base is imperforate. The body has no visible glaze."

== Distribution ==
This species occurs in the Pacific Ocean from the Aleutian Islands, Alaska (175°E) to Peru (3° S) between depths of 750 m to 5100 m; also off La Jolla and San Diego, California.
