= Visayaseguenzia =

Scientific classification
- Kingdom: Animalia
- Phylum: Mollusca
- Class: Gastropoda
- Subclass: Vetigastropoda
- Family: Seguenziidae
- Subfamily: Seguenziinae
- Tribe: Fluxinellini
- Genus: Visayaseguenzia; Poppe, Tagaro & Dekker, 2006

Type species
- Visayaseguenzia maestratii Poppe, Tagaro & Dekker, 2006

Genus of gastropods

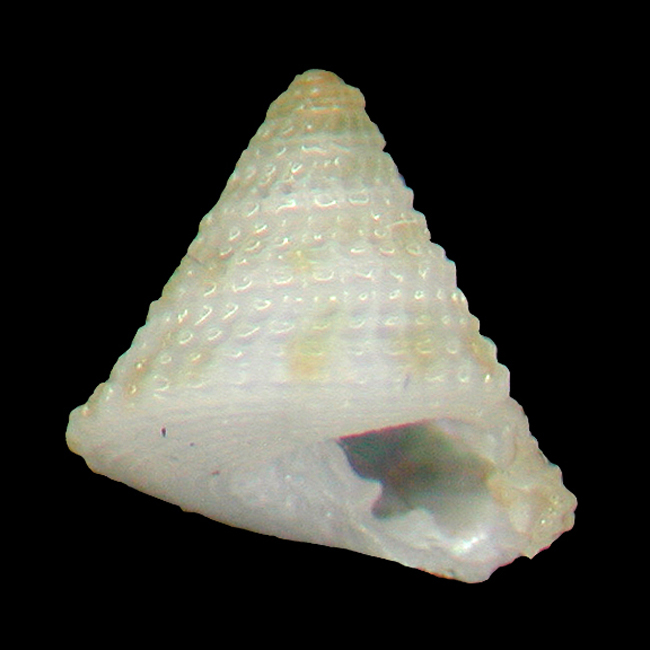
Seashell Visayaseguenzia maestratii

Visayaseguenzia is a genus of sea snails, marine gastropod molluscs in the family Seguenziidae.

== Species ==
Species within the genus Visayaseguenzia include:

- Visayaseguenzia cumingi Poppe, Tagaro & Dekker, 2006
- Visayaseguenzia maestratii Poppe, Tagaro & Dekker, 2006
