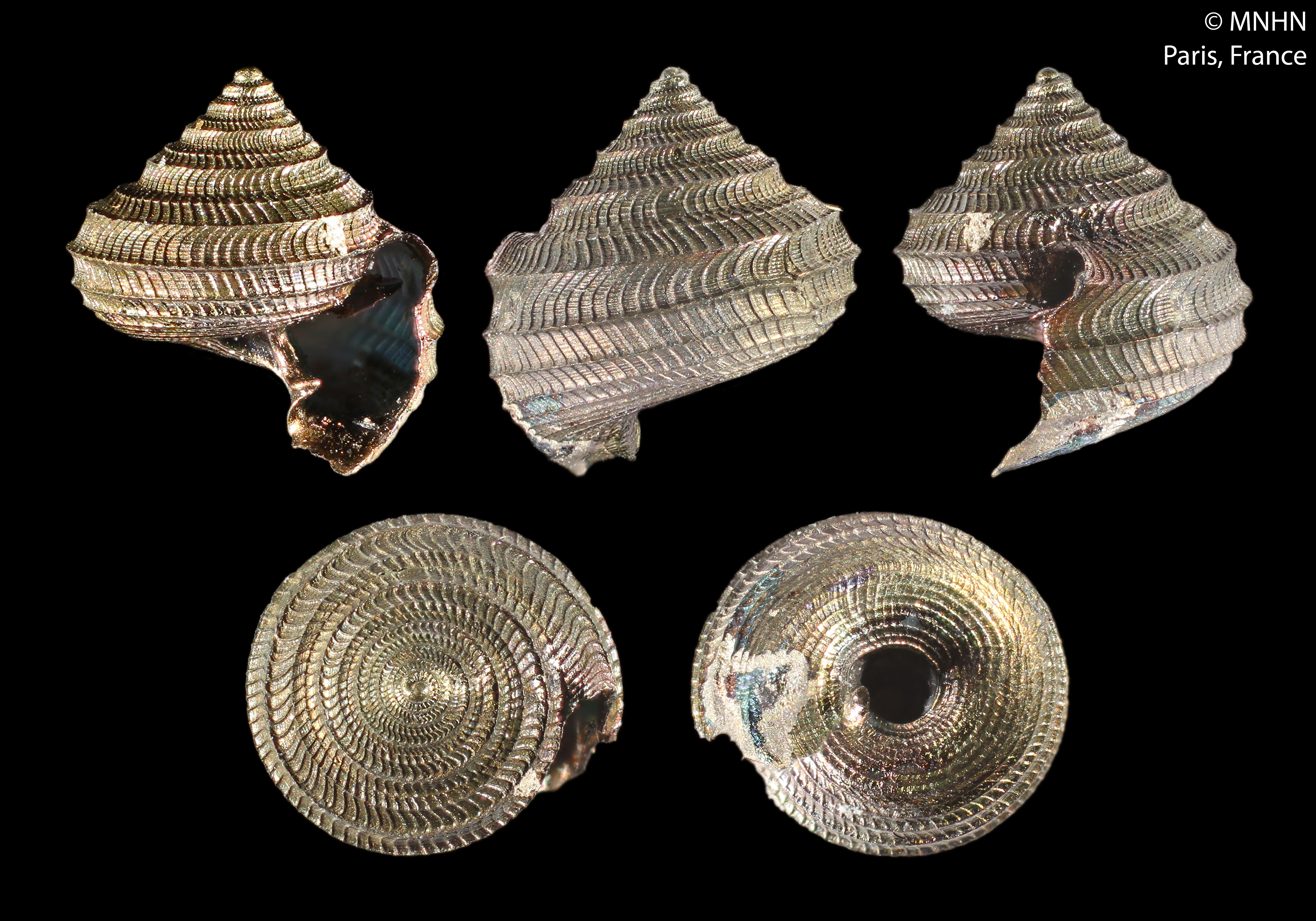
- Shell of Seguenzia eidalima (holotype at MNHN, Paris)

Scientific classification
- Kingdom: Animalia
- Phylum: Mollusca
- Class: Gastropoda
- Subclass: Vetigastropoda
- Superfamily: Seguenzioidea
- Family: Seguenziidae
- Subfamily: Seguenziinae
- Genus: Seguenzia; Jeffreys, 1876

Type species
- Seguenzia formosa Jeffreys, 1876

= Seguenzia =

Genus of gastropods

Seguenzia is a genus of sea snails, marine gastropod mollusks in the family Seguenziidae.

This genus was named after Giuseppe Seguenza (1833–1889), the palaeontologist at Messina, Italy.

== Description ==
The thin shell has a turbinate or subtrochoid shape. It is translucent, the outer layer very slight, somewhat nacreous in fresh specimens. There is no epidermis. The shell contains spiral carinations. The upper part of the body whorl is deeply and widely grooved. The aperture is irregular and sinuous behind. The columella is twisted and abruptly notched below. It has a small tooth-like process. The base of the shell shows a sinus. It is deeply umbilicated or imperforate. The thin operculum is oval, with a subcentral nucleus and with obsolete, numerous concentric lines.

== Species ==
According to the World Register of Marine Species (WoRMS), the following species with valid name are included within the genus Seguenzia :

- Seguenzia antarctica Thiele, 1925
- Seguenzia balicasagensis Poppe, Tagaro & Dekker, 2006
- Seguenzia beloni Poppe, Tagaro & Dekker, 2006
- Seguenzia cervola Dall, 1919
- Seguenzia chariessa Marshall, 1991
- Seguenzia chelina Marshall, 1983
- Seguenzia compta Marshall, 1983
- Seguenzia conopia Marshall, 1983
- Seguenzia costulifera Schepman, 1909
- Seguenzia dabfari Poppe, Tagaro & Dekker, 2006
- Seguenzia dautzenbergi Schepman, 1909
- † Seguenzia donaldi Ladd, 1982
- Seguenzia eidalima Marshall, 1991
- Seguenzia elegans Jeffreys, 1885
- Seguenzia elegantissima Poppe, Tagaro & Dekker, 2006
- Seguenzia emmeles Marshall, 1991
- Seguenzia engonia B.A. Marshall, 1991
- Seguenzia eritima Verrill, 1884
- Seguenzia eutyches Marshall, 1991
- Seguenzia fatigans Barnard, 1963
- Seguenzia floridana Dall, 1927
- Seguenzia formosa Jeffreys, 1876
- Seguenzia fulgida Marshall, 1983
- Seguenzia giovia Dall, 1919
- † Seguenzia glabella B. A. Marshall, 1983
- Seguenzia hapala Woodring, 1928
- Seguenzia hosyu Habe, 1953
- Seguenzia iota Marshall, 1991
- Seguenzia keikoae Poppe, Tagaro & Dekker, 2006
- Seguenzia levii Marshall, 1991
- Seguenzia lineata Watson, 1879
- Seguenzia louiseae A.H. Clarke, 1961
- Seguenzia macleani Geiger, 2017
- Seguenzia matara Marshall, 1988
- Seguenzia metivieri Marshall, 1991
- Seguenzia mirabilis Okutani, 1964
- Seguenzia monocingulata Seguenza, 1876
- Seguenzia nipponica Okutani, 1964
- Seguenzia nitida Verrill, 1884
- Seguenzia occidentalis Dall, 1908
- Seguenzia orientalis Thiele, 1925
- Seguenzia platamodes Marshall, 1991
- Seguenzia praeceps Marshall, 1991
- † Seguenzia prisca B. A. Marshall, 1983
- † Seguenzia propheta Lozouet, 1999
- Seguenzia richeri Marshall, 1991
- † Seguenzia serrata B. A. Marshall, 1983
- Seguenzia soyoae (Okutani, 1964)
- † Seguenzia statiana Sosso, Bertolaso & Dell'Angelo, 2020
- Seguenzia stegastris Marshall, 1991
- Seguenzia stephanica Dall, 1908
- Seguenzia sumatrensis Thiele, 1925
- Seguenzia textilis Marshall, 1983
- Seguenzia transenna Marshall, 1983
- Seguenzia triteia Salvador, Cavallari & Simone, 2014
- Seguenzia trochiformis Poppe, Tagaro & Dekker, 2006
- Seguenzia wareni Marshall, 1991

Species brought into synonymy

- Seguenzia caliana Dall, 1919: synonym of Seguenzia stephanica Dall, 1908
- Seguenzia carinata Jeffreys, 1876 synonym of Carenzia carinata (Jeffreys, 1877)
- Seguenzia certoma Dall, 1919: synonym of Seguenzia stephanica Dall, 1908
- Seguenzia cazioti Dautzenberg, 1925: synonym of Quinnia cazioti (Dautzenberg, 1925)
- Seguenzia ionica Watson, 1878 synonym of Quinnia ionica (Watson, 1878)
- Seguenzia laxa Jeffreys, 1885: synonym of Haloceras laxa (Jeffreys, 1885)
- Seguenzia megaloconcha Rokop, 1972: synonym of Seguenzia cervola Dall, 1919
- Seguenzia melvillii Schepman, 1909: synonym of Carenzia melvillii (Schepman, 1909)
- Seguenzia polita Verco, 1906: synonym of Quinnia polita (Verco, 1906)
- Seguenzia quinni J. H. McLean, 1985: synonym of Seguenzia giovia Dall, 1919
- Seguenzia reticulata (Philippi, 1844): synonym of Ancistrobasis reticulata (Philippi, 1844)
- Seguenzia rushi Dall, 1927: synonym of Quinnia rushi (, 1927)
- Seguenzia siberutensis Thiele, 1925: synonym of Halystina siberutensis (Thiele, 1925)
- Seguenzia simplex Barnard, 1963: synonym of Halystina simplex (Barnard, 1963)
- Seguenzia sykesi Schepman, 1909: synonym of Quinnia sykesi (Schepman, 1909)
- Seguenzia tricarinata Jeffreys, 1885: synonym of Haloceras tricarinata (Jeffreys, 1885)
