= Rotellenzia =

Scientific classification
- Kingdom: Animalia
- Phylum: Mollusca
- Class: Gastropoda
- Subclass: Vetigastropoda
- Superfamily: Seguenzioidea
- Family: Seguenziidae
- Subfamily: Seguenziinae
- Genus: Rotellenzia; Quinn, 1987

Genus of gastropods

Rotellenzia is a genus of extremely small deep water sea snails, marine gastropod mollusks in the family Seguenziidae.

== Species ==
Species within the genus Rotellenzia include:

- Rotellenzia lampra (Watson, 1879)
