= Sericogyra =

Scientific classification
- Kingdom: Animalia
- Phylum: Mollusca
- Class: Gastropoda
- Subclass: Vetigastropoda
- Family: Seguenziidae
- Subfamily: Guttulinae
- Genus: Sericogyra; Marshall, 1988

Type species
- Sericogyra metallica Marshall, 1988

Genus of gastropods

Sericogyra is a genus of sea snails, marine gastropod mollusks in the family Seguenziidae.

== Description ==
The turbinate shell has collabral axial riblets and lacks a peripheral carina. There is no midwhorl angulation. Spiral lirae are present on all whorls. The shell has no basal, posterior of anterolateral sinuses. There is no columellar sinus or columellar tooth. The aperture is circular. There is no umbilical septum. The shell contains granular microsculpture.

Radula: the rachidian tooth is broader than high and has lateral wings prominent. The lateral tooth cusp is broad to absent. The marginal tooth pairs are smaller or equal to 10.

== Species ==
Species within the genus Sericogyra include:

- Sericogyra metallica Marshall, 1988
- Sericogyra periglenes Marshall, 1988
