= Oligomeria =

Scientific classification
- Kingdom: Animalia
- Phylum: Mollusca
- Class: Gastropoda
- Subclass: Vetigastropoda
- Superfamily: Seguenzioidea
- Family: Seguenziidae
- Subfamily: Davisianinae
- Genus: Oligomeria; Galkin & Golikov, 1985

Genus of gastropods

Oligomeria is a genus of extremely small deep water sea snails, marine gastropod mollusks in the family Seguenziidae.

== Species ==
Species within the genus Oligomeria include:

- Oligomeria conoidea Galkin & Golikov, 1985
