= Davisiana =

Scientific classification
- Kingdom: Animalia
- Phylum: Mollusca
- Class: Gastropoda
- Subclass: Vetigastropoda
- Superfamily: Seguenzioidea
- Family: Seguenziidae
- Subfamily: Davisianinae
- Genus: Davisiana; Egorova, 1972

Genus of gastropods

Davisiana is a genus of extremely small deep water sea snails, marine gastropod mollusks in the family Seguenziidae.

== Species ==
Species within the genus Davisiana include:

- Davisiana inquirenda Egorova, 1972
