= Seguenzia nitida =

Scientific classification
- Kingdom: Animalia
- Phylum: Mollusca
- Class: Gastropoda
- Subclass: Vetigastropoda
- Family: Seguenziidae
- Genus: Seguenzia
- Species: S. nitida

Binomial name
- Seguenzia nitida A. E. Verrill, 1884

Synonyms
- Seguenzia formosa var. nitida A. E. Verrill, 1884 (original description)

Species of gastropod

Seguenzia nitida is a species of sea snail, a marine gastropod mollusk in the family Seguenziidae. It is both a grazer and a deposit feeder.

== Description ==
The height of the shell is 5mm, the width is 4mm, and its breadth is 2mm.

It is shaped like a top shell and is translucent when fresh. It has narrow spiral twists around the base.

The whorl is prominent, rounded, and smooth.

== Distribution ==
This species occurs in the Atlantic Ocean off Delaware, USA, at a depth of about 3,700 m.
