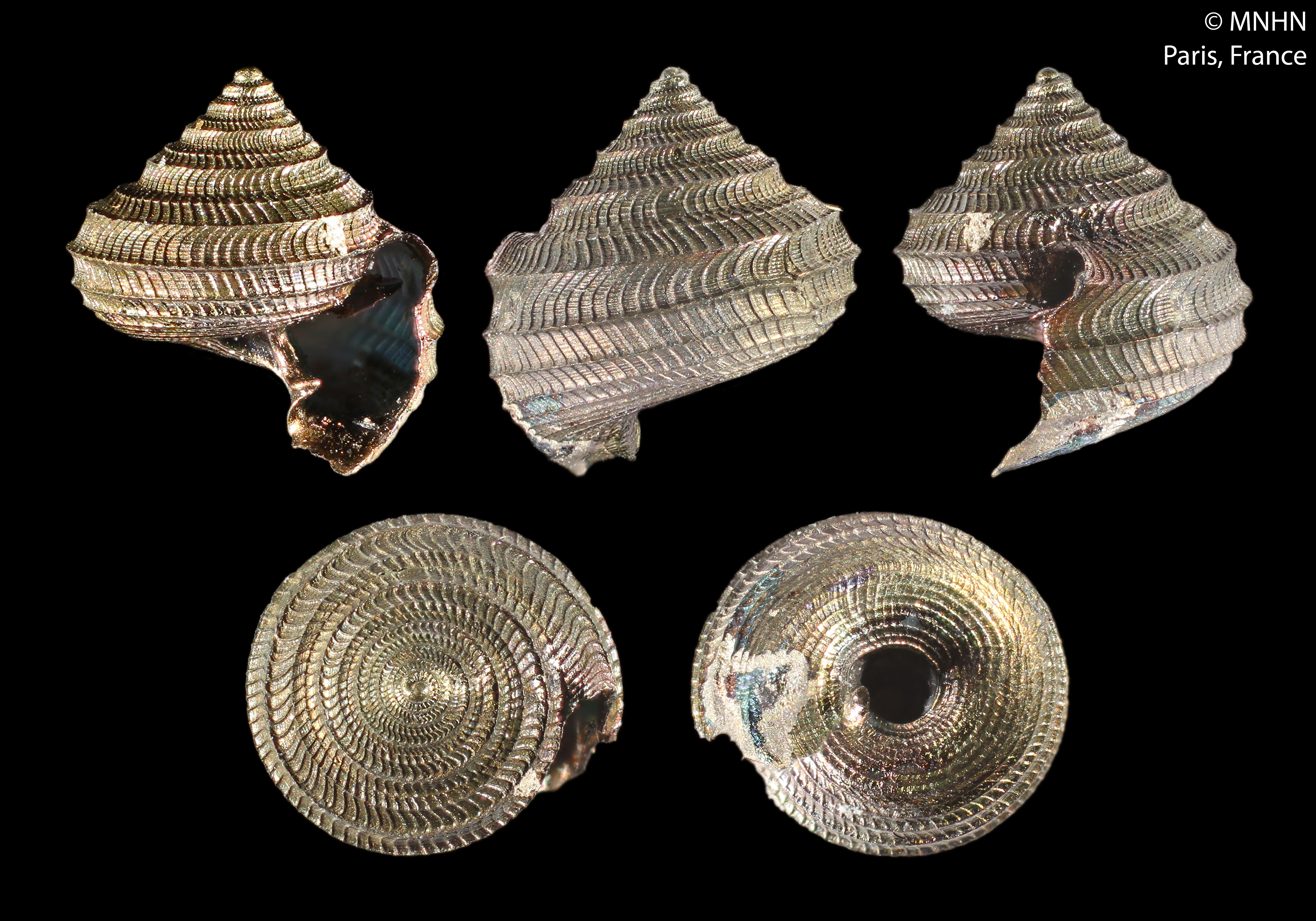
- Shell of Seguenzia eidalima

Scientific classification
- Kingdom: Animalia
- Phylum: Mollusca
- Class: Gastropoda
- Subclass: Vetigastropoda
- Superfamily: Seguenzioidea
- Family: Seguenziidae; Verrill, 1884

Subfamilies
- Asthelysinae; Davisianinae; Guttulinae; Seguenziinae

= Seguenziidae =

Family of gastropods

Seguenziidae is a family of very small deepwater sea snails, marine gastropod mollusks in the superfamily Seguenzioidea (according to the taxonomy of the Gastropoda by Bouchet & Rocroi, 2005).

== Distribution ==
Species from this family occur in the Atlantic Ocean, the Pacific Ocean, the Indian Ocean and the Antarctic Ocean, mostly at bathyal and abyssal depths. Only a few species have been found at depths less than 300 m and none at intertidal depths.

== Description ==
The thin, translucent, white shell has a trochiform shape. They are small or very small. Their maximum height is 22 mm. They are usually nacreous. The inner lip has often a tooth-like fold. The outer lip has characteristically one to three concave notches (except in the genus Guttula). The chitinous operculum is multispiral. The rhipidoglossan radula has intermediate characteristics of the former order Archaeogastropoda (by having more than two pairs of marginal teeth) and the former order Mesogastropoda (by having a single pair of lateral teeth).

== Taxonomy ==
This family consists of four following subfamilies (according to the taxonomy of the Gastropoda by Bouchet & Rocroi, 2005) with the following genera

- Asthelysinae Marshall, 1991
  - Anxietas Iredale, 1917
  - Asthelys Quinn, 1987
  - Eratasthelys Marshall, 1991
  - Thelyssina Marshall, 1983
- Davisianinae Egorova, 1972 - synonyms: Putillinae F. Nordsieck, 1972; Oligomeriinae Egorov, 2000
  - Davisiana Egorova, 1972
  - Oligomeria Galkin & Golikov, 1985
- Guttulinae Goryachev, 1987
  - Guttula Schepman, 1908
  - Sericogyra Marshall, 1988
- Seguenziinae Verrill, 1884
  - tribe Fluxinellini Marshall, 1991
    - Ancistrobasis Dall, 1889
    - Basilissa Watson, 1879
    - Basilissopsis Dautzenberg & Fischer, 1897
    - Calliobasis Marshall, 1983
    - Fluxinella Marshall, 1983
    - Thelyssa Bayer, 1971
    - Visayaseguenzia Poppe, Tagaro & Dekker, 2006
  - tribe Seguenziini Verrill, 1884
    - Carenzia Quinn, 1983
    - Hadroconus Quinn, 1987
    - Halystes Marshall, 1988
    - Halystina Marshall, 1991
    - Quinnia Marshall, 1988
    - Rotellenzia Quinn, 1987
    - Seguenzia Jeffreys, 1876: the type genus
    - Seguenziopsis Marshall, 1983
- Unassigned :
- Bathymargarites Warén & Bouchet, 1989

Genera brought into synonymy

- Fluxiella Okutani, 1968: synonym of Fluxinella B.A. Marshall, 1983
- Seguenziella Marshall, 1983: synonym of Quinnia Marshall, 1988
