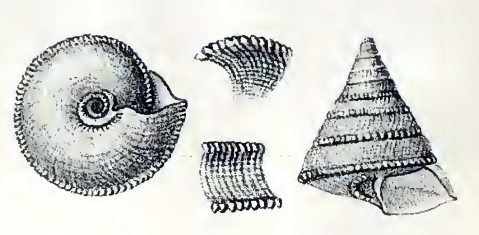
- Basilissa superba

Scientific classification
- Kingdom: Animalia
- Phylum: Mollusca
- Class: Gastropoda
- Subclass: Vetigastropoda
- Superfamily: Seguenzioidea
- Family: Seguenziidae
- Subfamily: Seguenziinae
- Genus: Basilissa; Watson, 1879

= Basilissa (gastropod) =

Genus of molluscs

Basilissa is a genus of extremely small deep water sea snails. They are marine gastropod mollusks in the family Seguenziidae.

== Species ==
Species within the genus Basilissa include:

- Basilissa soyoae Okutani, 1964
- Basilissa superba Watson, 1879

The following species were brought into synonymy:

- Basilissa alta Watson, 1879 synonym of Hadroconus altus (Watson, 1879)
- Basilissa babelica Watson, 1907 synonym of Orectospira tectiformis (Watson, 1880)
- Basilissa bombax Cotton & Godfrey, 1938 synonym of Calliobasis bombax (Cotton & Godfrey, 1938)
- Basilissa costulata Watson, 1879 synonym of Ancistrobasis reticulata (Philippi, 1844)
- Basilissa discula (Dall, 1889): synonym of Fluxinella discula (Dall, 1889)
- Basilissa gelida Barnard, 1963: synonym of Fluxinella gelida (Barnard, 1963) (original combination)
- Basilissa lampra Watson, 1879 synonym of Rotellenzia lampra (Watson, 1879)
- Basilissa munda Watson, 1879 synonym of Asthelys munda (Watson, 1879)
- Basilissa niceterium Hedley & May, 1908 synonym of Carinastele niceterium (Hedley & May, 1908)
- Basilissa rhyssa Dall, 1927: synonym of Basilissopsis rhyssa (Dall, 1927)
- Basilissa sibogae Schepman, 1908 synonym of Hadroconus sibogae (Schepman, 1908)
- Basilissa simplex Watson, 1879 synonym of Asthelys simplex (Watson, 1879)
- Basilissa trochiformis (Schepman, 1909) synonym of Fluxinella trochiformis (Schepman, 1909)
- Basilissa watsoni Dall, 1927 synonym of Hadroconus watsoni (Dall, 1927)
