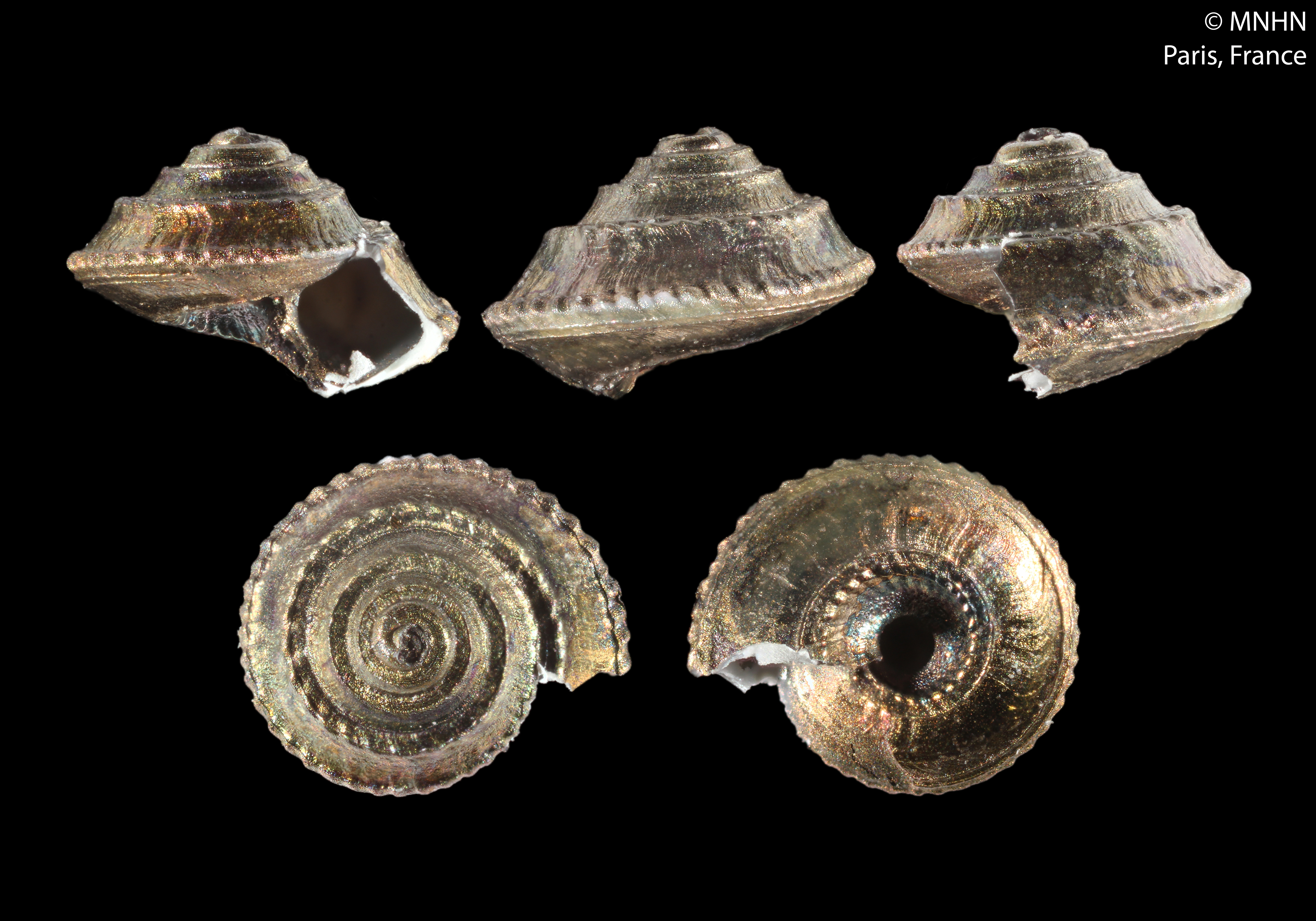
- Shell of Asthelys depressa (holotype at MNHN, Paris)

Scientific classification
- Kingdom: Animalia
- Phylum: Mollusca
- Class: Gastropoda
- Subclass: Vetigastropoda
- Superfamily: Seguenzioidea
- Family: Seguenziidae
- Subfamily: Asthelysinae
- Genus: Asthelys
- Species: A. depressa

Binomial name
- Asthelys depressa Marshall, 1991

= Asthelys depressa =

Species of gastropod

Asthelys depressa is a species of extremely small deep water sea snail, a marine gastropod mollusk in the family Seguenziidae.

== Distribution ==
This marine species occurs off New Caledonia and the Loyalty Islands.
