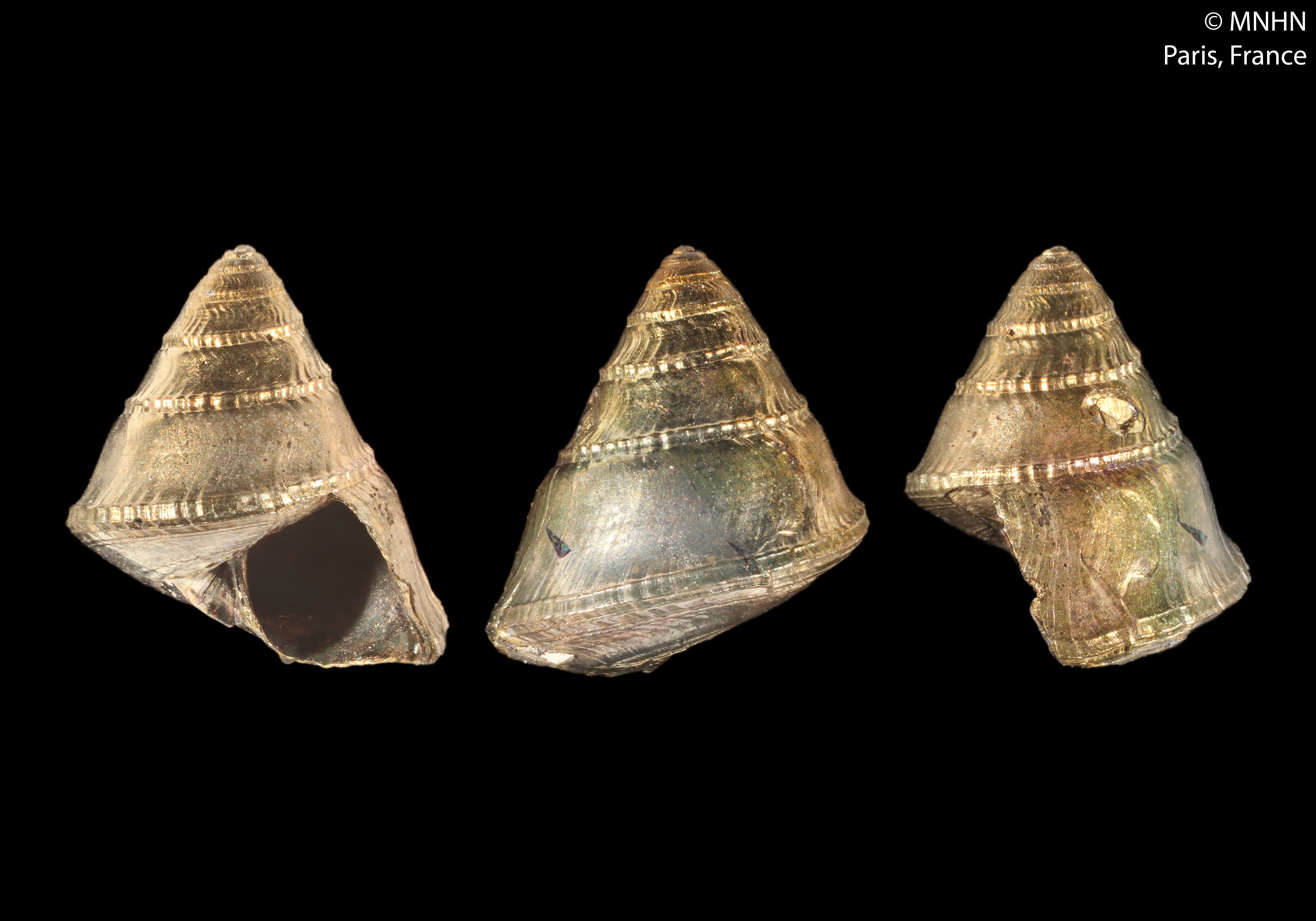
- Shell of Asthelys semiplicata (holotype at MNHN, Paris)

Scientific classification
- Kingdom: Animalia
- Phylum: Mollusca
- Class: Gastropoda
- Subclass: Vetigastropoda
- Superfamily: Seguenzioidea
- Family: Seguenziidae
- Subfamily: Asthelysinae
- Genus: Asthelys
- Species: A. semiplicata

Binomial name
- Asthelys semiplicata Marshall, 1991

= Asthelys semiplicata =

Species of gastropod

Asthelys semiplicata is a species of extremely small deep water sea snail, a marine gastropod mollusk in the family Seguenziidae.

== Distribution ==
This marine species occurs off New Caledonia, the Loyalty Islands and off Queensland, Australia at depths between 1330 m and 1620 m.
