= Asthelys nitidula =

Scientific classification
- Kingdom: Animalia
- Phylum: Mollusca
- Class: Gastropoda
- Subclass: Vetigastropoda
- Superfamily: Seguenzioidea
- Family: Seguenziidae
- Subfamily: Asthelysinae
- Genus: Asthelys
- Species: A. nitidula

Binomial name
- Asthelys nitidula Marshall, 1991

Species of gastropod

Asthelys nitidula is a species of extremely small deep water sea snail, a marine gastropod mollusk in the family Seguenziidae.
