= Thelyssina sterrha =

Scientific classification
- Kingdom: Animalia
- Phylum: Mollusca
- Class: Gastropoda
- Subclass: Vetigastropoda
- Superfamily: Seguenzioidea
- Family: Seguenziidae
- Subfamily: Asthelysinae
- Genus: Thelyssina
- Species: T. sterrha

Binomial name
- Thelyssina sterrha Marshall, 1983

Species of gastropod

Thelyssina sterrha is a species of extremely small deep water sea snail, a marine gastropod mollusk in the family Seguenziidae.

== Distribution ==
This marine species occurs off New Zealand.
