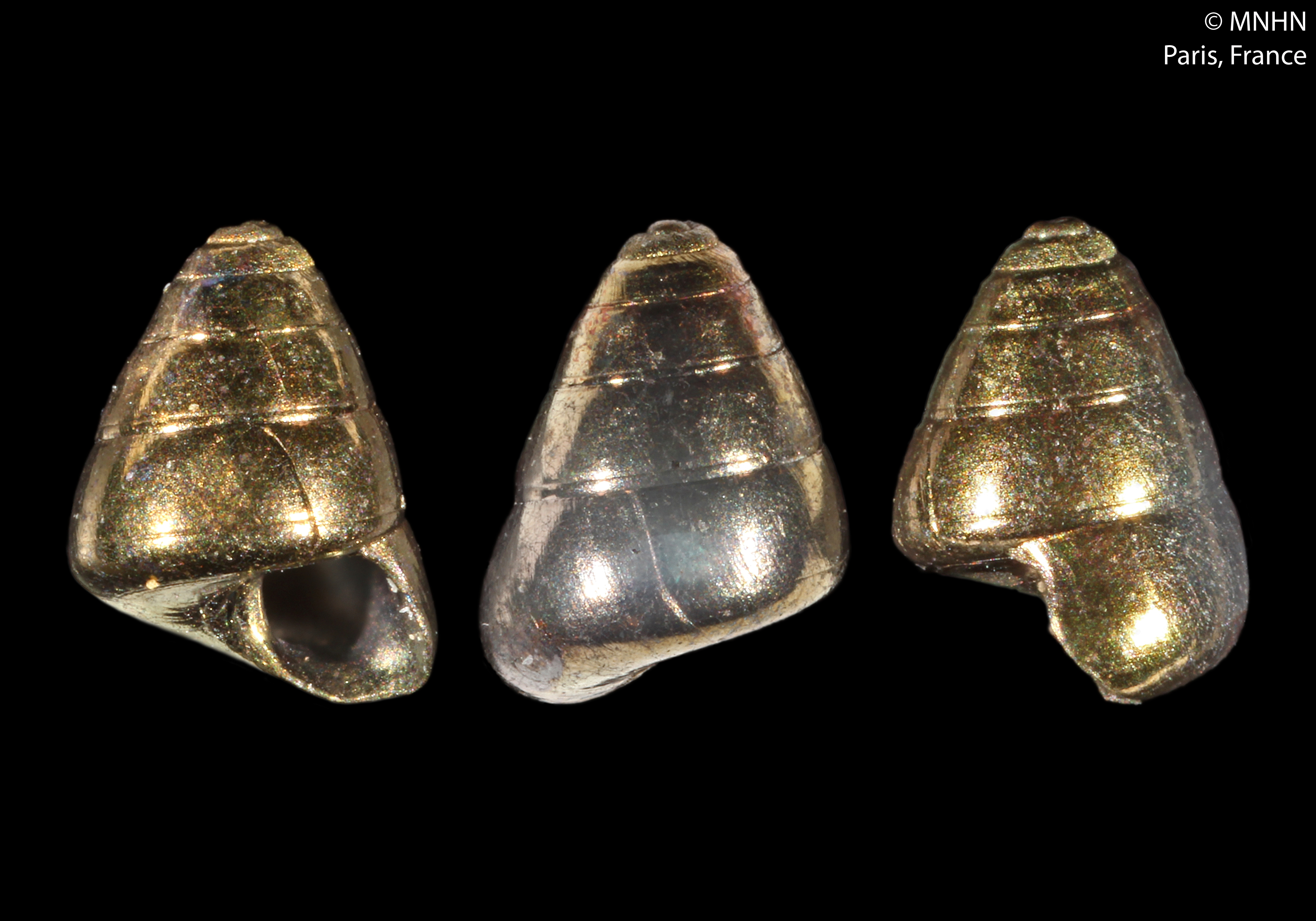
- Shell of Anxietas inspirata (holotype at MNHN, Paris)

Scientific classification
- Kingdom: Animalia
- Phylum: Mollusca
- Class: Gastropoda
- Subclass: Vetigastropoda
- Superfamily: Seguenzioidea
- Family: Seguenziidae
- Subfamily: Asthelysinae
- Genus: Anxietas
- Species: A. inspirata

Binomial name
- Anxietas inspirata Marshall, 1991

= Anxietas inspirata =

Species of gastropod

Anxietas inspirata is a species of extremely small deep water sea snail, a marine gastropod mollusk in the family Seguenziidae.
