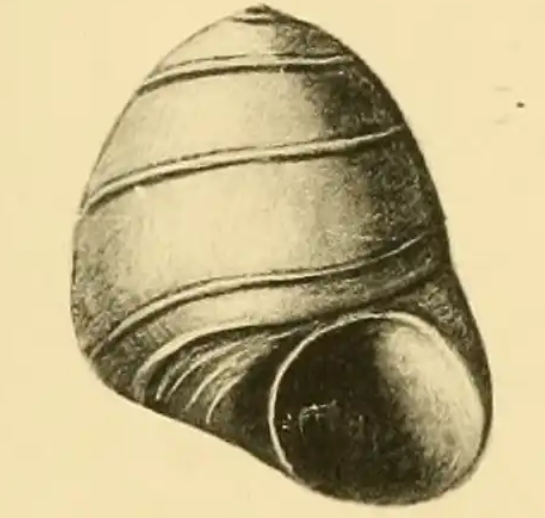
- Shell of Anxietas perplexa (holotype)

Scientific classification
- Kingdom: Animalia
- Phylum: Mollusca
- Class: Gastropoda
- Subclass: Vetigastropoda
- Superfamily: Seguenzioidea
- Family: Seguenziidae
- Subfamily: Asthelysinae
- Genus: Anxietas
- Species: A. perplexa

Binomial name
- Anxietas perplexa Iredale, 1917

= Anxietas perplexa =

Species of gastropod

Anxietas perplexa is a species of extremely small deep water sea snail, a marine gastropod mollusk in the family Seguenziidae.

== Description ==
The shell measures approximately 1.5 mm in height and 1 mm in breadth.

(Original description) The shell is minute and conical, with a flattened apex, rounded sides, and a flattened base. It is almost entirely unsculptured and has a somewhat quadrangular aperture with thin, sharp edges. The colour is a pale brownish yellow, with a darker line marking the sutures.

The shell contains fve whorls. The apical two form a flattened, planate protoconch, while the succeeding three descend rather rapidly but remain tightly coiled, with no umbilicus. On the base of the body whorl, just below the periphery, there are a couple of closely spaced, incised lines. Apart from these, little sculpture is present. A similar incised line occurs above the periphery, running parallel to the suture on each of the three post-nuclear whorls.

The columella is simple and erect, though slightly curved, and the aperture is oblique with thin margins.

== Distribution ==
This marine species occurs off Christmas Island.
