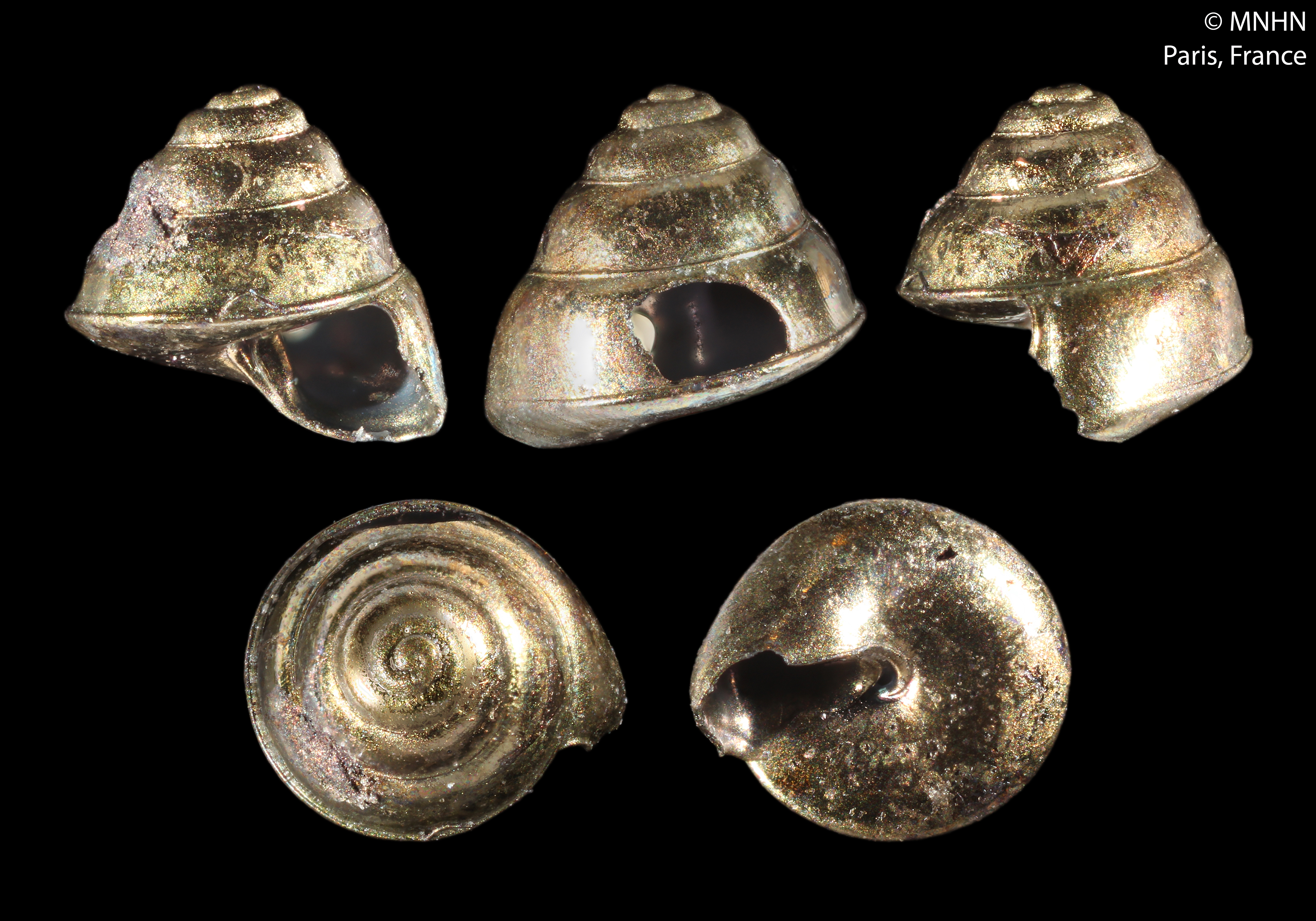
- Shell of Anxietas exigua (holotype at MNHN, Paris)

Scientific classification
- Kingdom: Animalia
- Phylum: Mollusca
- Class: Gastropoda
- Subclass: Vetigastropoda
- Superfamily: Seguenzioidea
- Family: Seguenziidae
- Subfamily: Asthelysinae
- Genus: Anxietas
- Species: A. exigua

Binomial name
- Anxietas exigua Marshall, 1991

= Anxietas exigua =

Species of gastropod

Anxietas exigua is a species of extremely small deep water sea snail, a marine gastropod mollusk in the family Seguenziidae.
