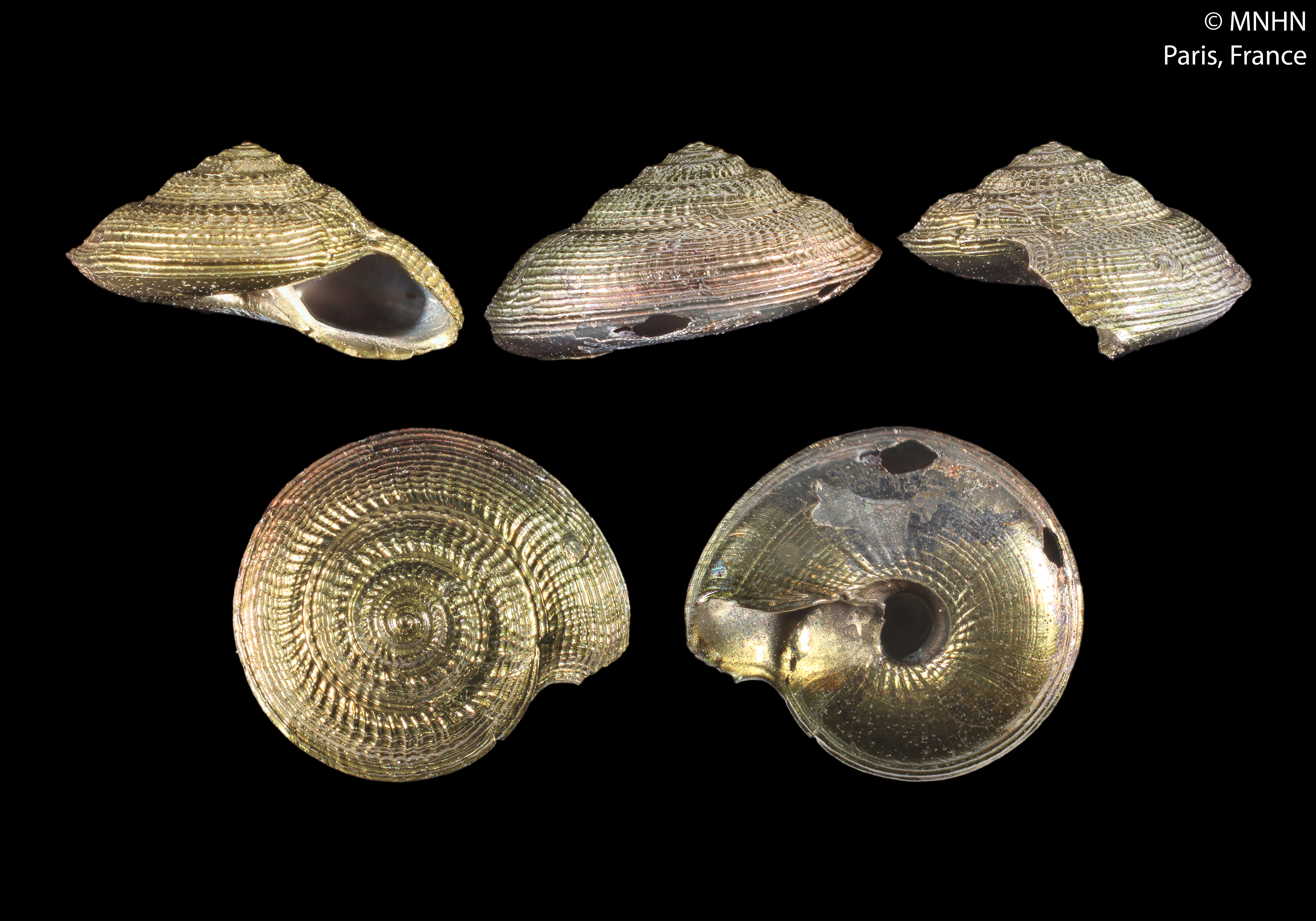
- Shell of Eratasthelys corona (holotype at MNHN, Paris)

Scientific classification
- Kingdom: Animalia
- Phylum: Mollusca
- Class: Gastropoda
- Subclass: Vetigastropoda
- Superfamily: Seguenzioidea
- Family: Seguenziidae
- Subfamily: Asthelysinae
- Genus: Eratasthelys
- Species: E. corona

Binomial name
- Eratasthelys corona Marshall, 1991

= Eratasthelys corona =

Species of gastropod

Eratasthelys corona is a species of extremely small deep water sea snail, a marine gastropod mollusk in the family Seguenziidae.

== Description ==
The length of the shell attains 6.7 mm.

== Distribution ==
This marine species occurs off New Caledonia.
