= Asthelys antarctica =

Scientific classification
- Kingdom: Animalia
- Phylum: Mollusca
- Class: Gastropoda
- Subclass: Vetigastropoda
- Superfamily: Seguenzioidea
- Family: Seguenziidae
- Subfamily: Asthelysinae
- Genus: Asthelys
- Species: A. antarctica

Binomial name
- Asthelys antarctica Marshall, 1988

Species of gastropod

Asthelys antarctica is a species of extremely small deep water sea snail, a marine gastropod mollusk in the family Seguenziidae.

== Description ==
The shell attains a height of 5.8 mm.

== Distribution ==
This species occurs in Antarctic waters off the South Shetland Islands at a depth of about 3700 m.
