= Fluxinella lenticulosa =

Scientific classification
- Kingdom: Animalia
- Phylum: Mollusca
- Class: Gastropoda
- Subclass: Vetigastropoda
- Superfamily: Seguenzioidea
- Family: Seguenziidae
- Subfamily: Seguenziinae
- Genus: Fluxinella
- Species: F. lenticulosa

Binomial name
- Fluxinella lenticulosa Marshall, 1983

Species of gastropod

Fluxinella lenticulosa is a species of extremely small deep water sea snail, a marine gastropod mollusk in the family Seguenziidae.

== Description ==
The height of the thin, white shell attains 2.3 mm. It is strongly depressed with a width of 6.85 mm. It is umbilicate and translucent nacreous.

== Distribution ==
This marine species occurs off New Zealand found at depths between 800 m and 1,000 m.
