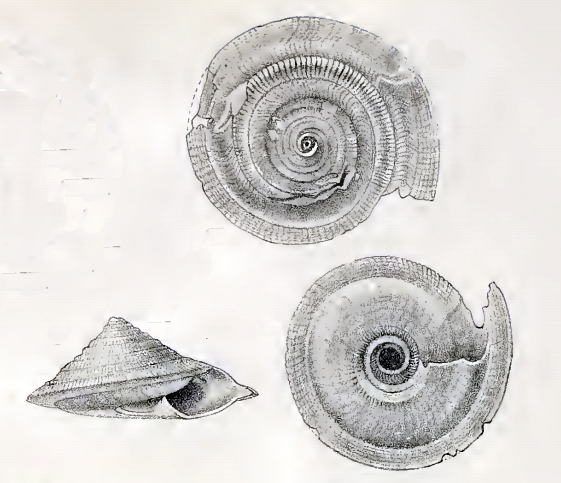
- Original drawing with three views of a shell of Fluxinella marginata

Scientific classification
- Kingdom: Animalia
- Phylum: Mollusca
- Class: Gastropoda
- Subclass: Vetigastropoda
- Superfamily: Seguenzioidea
- Family: Seguenziidae
- Subfamily: Seguenziinae
- Genus: Fluxinella
- Species: F. marginata

Binomial name
- Fluxinella marginata (Schepman, 1909)

Synonyms
- Calliostoma marginata (Schepman, 1909); Fluxina marginata Schepman, 1909 (original description)

= Fluxinella marginata =

Species of gastropod

Fluxinella marginata is a species of extremely small deep water sea snail, a marine gastropod mollusc in the family Seguenziidae.

== Description ==
(Original description by Schepman) The height of the shell attains 3¾ mm. The thin, whitish shell is very depressed, conic, and sharply keeled at the periphery, The 5 teleoconch whorls are spirally divided into 2 parts, convex above but concave if taken as a whole. The protoconch is umbilicate. The sculpture consists of very faint spiral striae, crossed by stronger, undulate, riblike, rather distant ones, with faint growth striae in the interstices. These riblike striae are less conspicuous on the body whorl. The lower part of each whorl has the appearance of a broad margin, slightly concave above, separated from the upper part of each whorl, by a kind of spiral rib, which is slightly crenulated. This marginal part is sculptured by rather conspicuous spiral and stronger, oblique, but nearly straight, riblike radiating striae, which on the upper part make the keel slightly crenulate (on the largest specimen the keel is smooth, on account of the less conspicuous sculpture). The basal part of body whorl is convex, with a few more or less conspicuous spiral striae around the umbilicus, and faint, strongly curved, radiating striae. The margin is separated from the central part by a deep groove, with about 7 spirals and faint growth striae. The umbilicus is large, pervious, scalar, and bordered by a strong rib which is surrounded by a deep groove, The umbilical wall is perpendicular. The aperture is rhombic, with convex upper, outer and basal margins. The keel is protracted in a claw in the younger specimen The columellar margin is excavated, slightly thickened, angular below near the umbilical keel, and forming there a somewhat tongue-shaped triangle.

== Distribution ==
This species is found in the Banda Sea, Indonesia.
