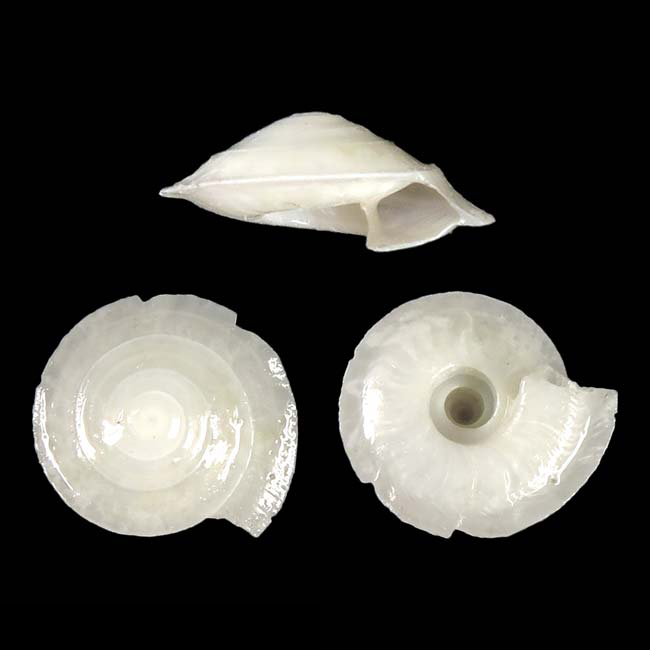
- Shell of Fluxinella vitrina

Scientific classification
- Kingdom: Animalia
- Phylum: Mollusca
- Class: Gastropoda
- Subclass: Vetigastropoda
- Family: Seguenziidae
- Genus: Fluxinella
- Species: F. vitrina

Binomial name
- Fluxinella vitrina Poppe, Tagaro & Stahlschmidt, 2015

= Fluxinella vitrina =

Species of gastropod

Fluxinella vitrina is a species of sea snail, a marine gastropod mollusk in the family Seguenziidae.

== Description ==
The length of the shell attains 3 mm.

== Distribution ==
This marine species occurs off the Philippines.
