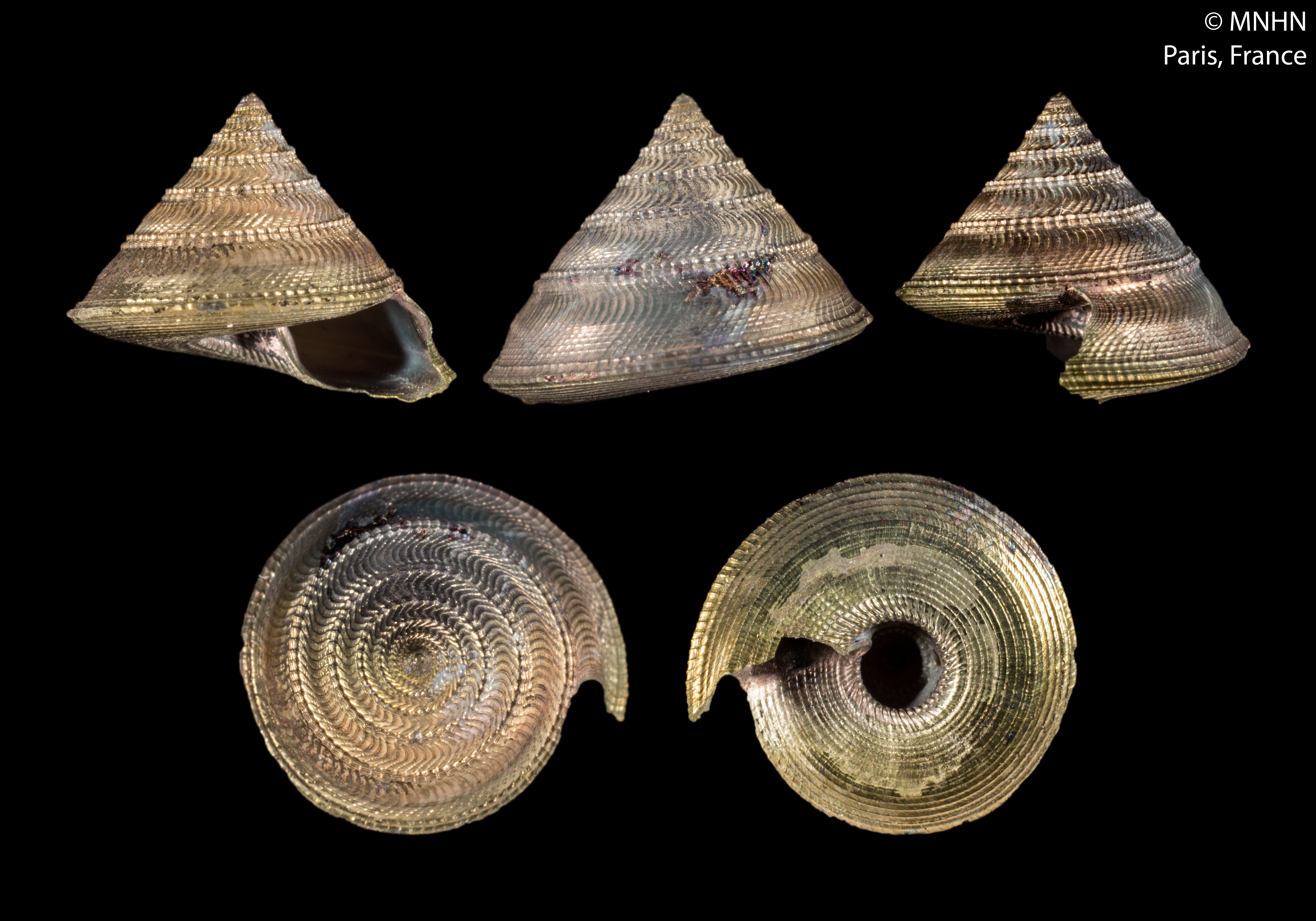
- PRESERVED_SPECIMEN; Hadroconus grandiosus B.A. Marshall, 1991; Type status: HOLOTYPE; Identified by: N/A; Individual count: 1; Event date: 1985-09-01T18:06:00Z

Scientific classification
- Kingdom: Animalia
- Phylum: Mollusca
- Class: Gastropoda
- Subclass: Vetigastropoda
- Superfamily: Seguenzioidea
- Family: Seguenziidae
- Subfamily: Seguenziinae
- Genus: Hadroconus
- Species: H. grandiosus

Binomial name
- Hadroconus grandiosus Marshall, 1991

= Hadroconus grandiosus =

Species of gastropod

Hadroconus grandiosus is a species of extremely small deep water sea snail, a marine gastropod mollusk in the family Seguenziidae.

== Distribution ==
This marine species occurs off New Caledonia.
