= Fluxinella lepida =

Scientific classification
- Kingdom: Animalia
- Phylum: Mollusca
- Class: Gastropoda
- Subclass: Vetigastropoda
- Superfamily: Seguenzioidea
- Family: Seguenziidae
- Subfamily: Seguenziinae
- Genus: Fluxinella
- Species: F. lepida

Binomial name
- Fluxinella lepida Marshall, 1983

Species of gastropod

Fluxinella lepida is a species of extremely small deep water sea snail, a marine gastropod mollusk in the family Seguenziidae.

== Description ==
The white, depressed shell is wider (7.30 mm) than high (3.35 mm). It is thin, highly polished and translucent nacreous.

== Distribution ==
This marine species occurs off New Zealand at depths between 800 m and 1,000 m.
