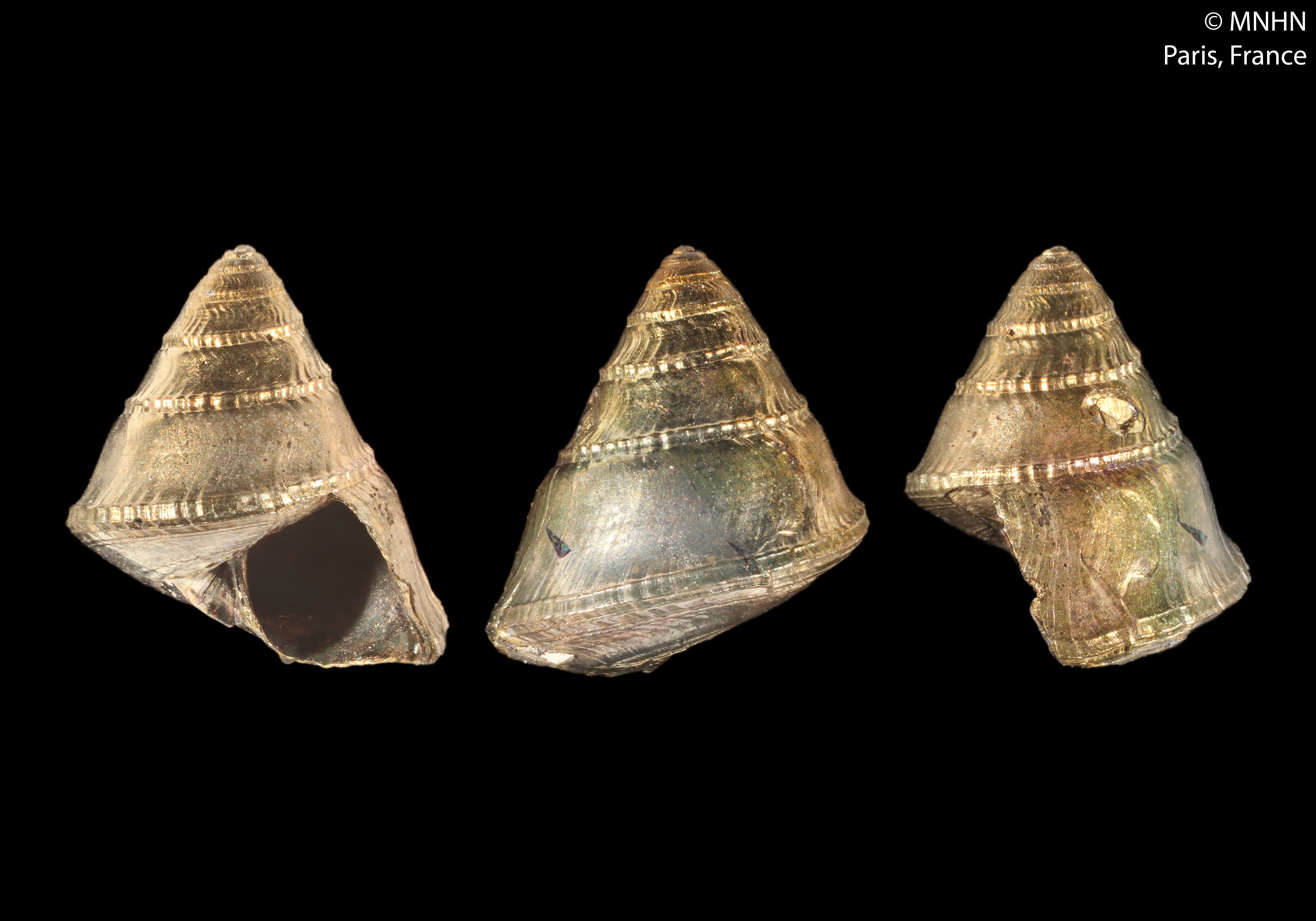
- Shell of Asthelys semiplicata

Scientific classification
- Kingdom: Animalia
- Phylum: Mollusca
- Class: Gastropoda
- Subclass: Vetigastropoda
- Family: Seguenziidae
- Subfamily: Asthelysinae
- Genus: Asthelys; Quinn, 1987

Type species
- Basilissa munda Watson, 1879

= Asthelys =

Genus of gastropods

Asthelys is a genus of sea snails, marine gastropod mollusks in the family Seguenziidae.

== Description ==
The conical shell lacks axial riblets and a peripheral carina but has a punctate microsculpture. The midwhorl angulation is initially absent, but present on later whorls. The shell contains no spiral lirae. The U-shaped posterior sinus is shallow. The basal sinus is present, but there is no anterolateral sinus. The columella has no sinus or tooth. Tha aperture has a rhomboidal shape. There is no umbilical septum.

Radula: the rachidian tooth is broader than high and has lateral wings prominent. The lateral tooth cusp is broad. There are less than 10 marginal tooth pairs.

== Species ==
Species within the genus Asthelys include:

- Asthelys antarctica Marshall, 1988
- Asthelys careyi Geiger, 2017
- Asthelys depressa Marshall, 1991
- Asthelys hyeresensis Hoffman, Gofas & Freiwald, 2020
- Asthelys munda (Watson, 1879)
- Asthelys nitidula Marshall, 1991
- Asthelys semiplicata Marshall, 1991
- Asthelys simplex (Watson, 1879)
