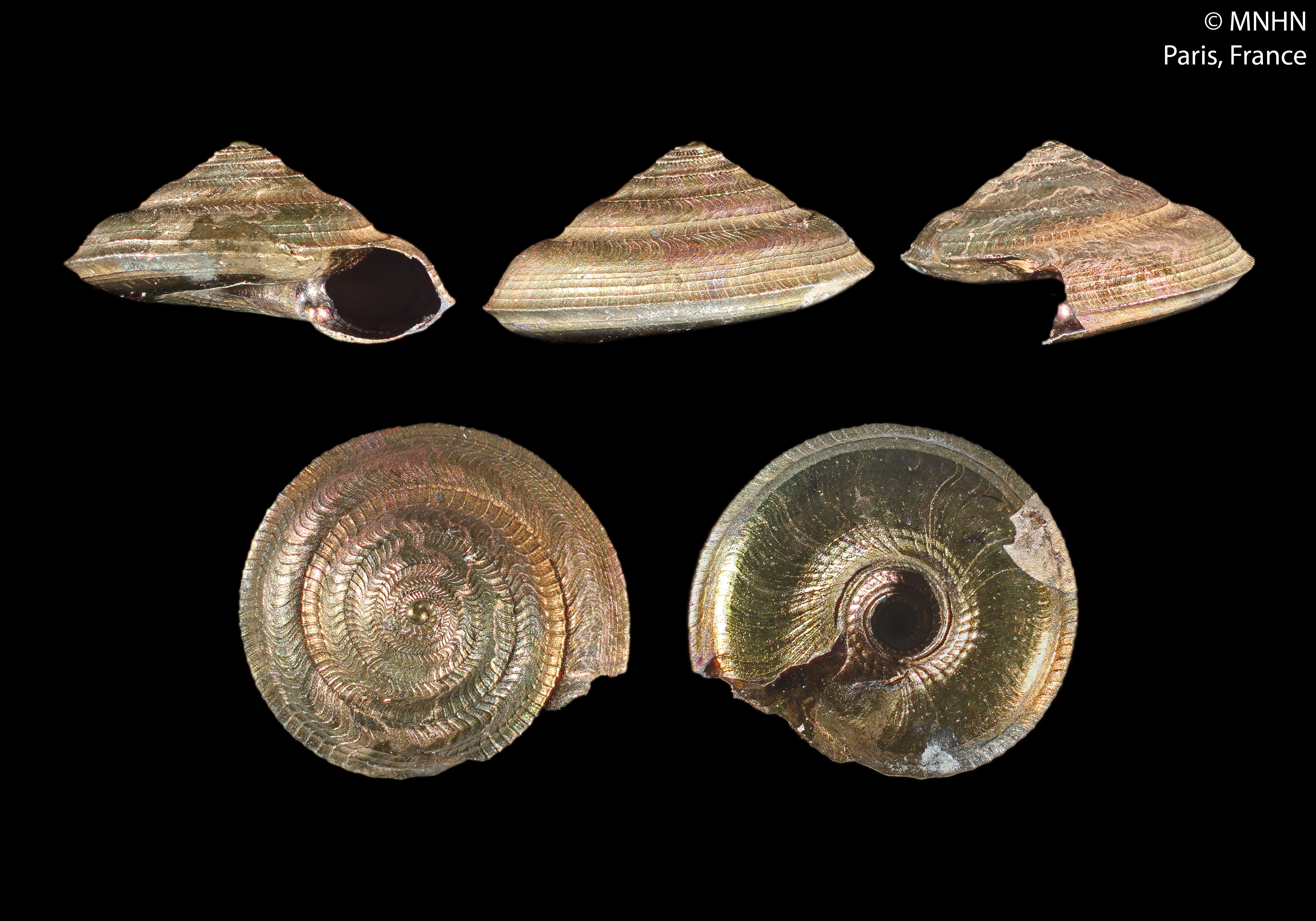
- Shell of Fluxinella stirophora (holotype at MNHN, Paris)

Scientific classification
- Kingdom: Animalia
- Phylum: Mollusca
- Class: Gastropoda
- Subclass: Vetigastropoda
- Superfamily: Seguenzioidea
- Family: Seguenziidae
- Subfamily: Seguenziinae
- Genus: Fluxinella
- Species: F. stirophora

Binomial name
- Fluxinella stirophora Marshall, 1991

= Fluxinella stirophora =

Species of gastropod

Fluxinella stirophora is a species of extremely small deep water sea snail, a marine gastropod mollusk in the family Seguenziidae.

== Description ==
The height of the shell attains 4.1 mm and it's size is about 3 to 4 mm. As a member of the seguinzine tribe, fluxinellini, members of this sea snail group thus possess stout, relatively rigid central and lateral teeth, and fine serrations that extend around the tips of the marginal teeth.
