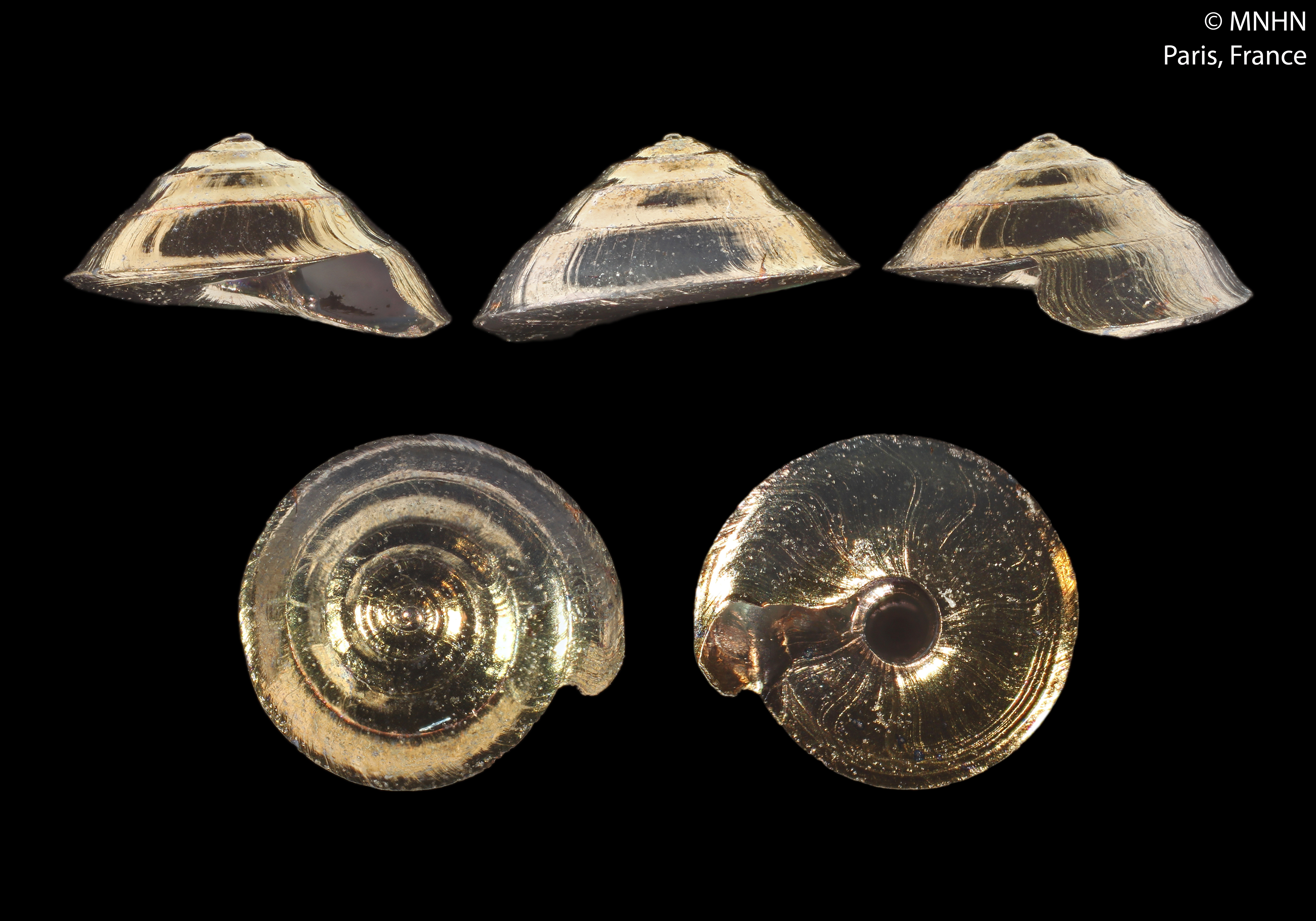
- Shell of Fluxinella runcinata (holotype at MNHN, Paris)

Scientific classification
- Kingdom: Animalia
- Phylum: Mollusca
- Class: Gastropoda
- Subclass: Vetigastropoda
- Superfamily: Seguenzioidea
- Family: Seguenziidae
- Subfamily: Seguenziinae
- Genus: Fluxinella
- Species: F. runcinata

Binomial name
- Fluxinella runcinata Marshall, 1991

= Fluxinella runcinata =

Species of gastropod

Fluxinella runcinata is a species of extremely small deep water sea snail, a marine gastropod mollusk in the family Seguenziidae.

== Description ==
The shell attains a length of 3.85 mm.

== Distribution ==
This marine species occurs off New Caledonia.
