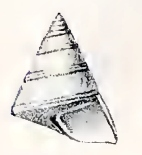
- Drawing with an apertural view of a shell of Asthelys simplex

Scientific classification
- Kingdom: Animalia
- Phylum: Mollusca
- Class: Gastropoda
- Subclass: Vetigastropoda
- Superfamily: Seguenzioidea
- Family: Seguenziidae
- Subfamily: Asthelysinae
- Genus: Asthelys
- Species: A. simplex

Binomial name
- Asthelys simplex (Watson, 1879)

Synonyms
- Basilissa simplex Watson, 1879 (original description)

= Asthelys simplex =

Species of gastropod

Asthelys simplex is a species of extremely small deep water sea snail, a marine gastropod mollusk in the family Seguenziidae.

== Description ==
The shell grows to a height of 6.5 mm. The shell is a rather narrow flat-based cone that is sharply angulated. The shell is small, thin, delicate, smooth, glassy, and nacreous under a thin white calcareous surface.

Sculpture: There are longitudinals, which are faint, hairlike and sinuated, showing the old lines of growth. The whole surface has traces of faint, rounded, and irregular spirals. At the bottom of each whorl is a flat puckered band about 0.25 mm. broad, whose upper edge projects sharply, especially on the upper whorls, and whose lower edge is a slight narrow flange, which forms a sharp carina at the periphery. This band forms the upper border of the suture, which is further marginated below by two not continuous rounded threads occupying the top edge of each whorl. The base of the shell is covered by about fourteen rounded ridges and furrows, which are rather stronger toward the center, the last one, forming the edge of the umbilicus, being specially so.

Color: The surface is a dead slightly creamy white, formed by a thin calcareous layer through which the underlying nacre shines.

The spire is high and conical. The apex broken. The 8 whorls (reckoning the first two as broken) show a slow and regular increase till the last, which enlarges rapidly. They are perfectly flat, with an upper and lower border, sharply angulated and carinated at the periphery, slightly convex but still very flat on the base, with a blunted angulated and carinated umbilical edge. The suture is linear, almost invisible, marginated above and below. The aperture is perpendicular, rhomboidal, with the columella and basal edges nearly equal, and the columella and outer lip nearly parallel. The outer lip is sharp and thin, not patulous, not descending, advancing at its junction with the body whorl, then retreating so as to form the broad open sinus, acute angled at the periphery, slightly arched across the base, nicked close to the point of the pillar. The columellar lip is arched, strengthened by a thin pad; reverted on the umbilicus so as to leave a slight groove behind it, it has a slight tooth in front. From the body whorl it bends very much over to the left, so as largely to cover the umbilicus, and then it curves over to the right to join the outer lip on the base at an obtuse angle. The umbilicus is small, oblique edged, funnel-shaped, nearly covered by the columellar lip, contracted within, scored with hair-like lines of growth.

== Distribution ==
This species occurs off the mouth of La Plata, Uruguay at a depth of 3,500 m.
