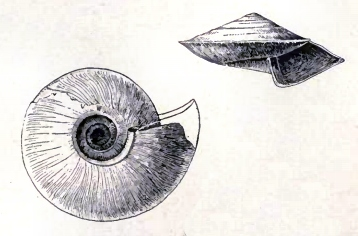
- Drawing with two views of a shell of Fluxinella discula

Scientific classification
- Kingdom: Animalia
- Phylum: Mollusca
- Class: Gastropoda
- Subclass: Vetigastropoda
- Superfamily: Seguenzioidea
- Family: Seguenziidae
- Subfamily: Seguenziinae
- Genus: Fluxinella; B.A. Marshall, 1983

Type species
- Fluxinella lepida Marshall, B.A., 1983

Synonyms
- Fluxiella Okutani, 1968 (nomen nudum)

= Fluxinella =

Genus of gastropods

Fluxinella is a genus of sea snails, marine gastropod mollusks in the tribe Fluxinellini ( of the subfamily Seguenziinae in the family Seguenziidae.

== Species ==
Species within the genus Fluxinella include:

- Fluxinella asceta Marshall, B.A., 1991
- Fluxinella brychia Marshall, B.A., 1991
- Fluxinella discula (Dall, 1889)
- Fluxinella euphanes Marshall, B.A., 1991
- Fluxinella gellida (Barnard, 1963)
- Fluxinella lenticulosa Marshall, B.A., 1983
- Fluxinella lepida Marshall, B.A., 1983
- Fluxinella marginata (Schepman, 1909)
- † Fluxinella maxwelli B. A. Marshall, 1983
- Fluxinella megalomphala Marshall, B.A., 1991
- Fluxinella membranacea Marshall, B.A., 1991
- Fluxinella polita Marshall, B.A., 1991
- Fluxinella runcinata Marshall, B.A., 1991
- Fluxinella solarium (Barnard, 1963)
- Fluxinella stellaris Bozzetti, 2008
- Fluxinella stenomphala (Melvill, 1910)
- Fluxinella stirophora Marshall, B.A., 1991
- Fluxinella tenera Marshall, B.A., 1991
- Fluxinella trochiformis (Schepman, 1909)
- Fluxinella vitrea (Okutani, 1968)
- Fluxinella vitrina Poppe, Tagaro & Stahlschmidt, 2015
- Fluxinella xysila Marshall, B.A., 1991
