= Thelyssina =

Scientific classification
- Kingdom: Animalia
- Phylum: Mollusca
- Class: Gastropoda
- Subclass: Vetigastropoda
- Family: Seguenziidae
- Subfamily: Asthelysinae
- Genus: Thelyssina; Marshall, 1983

Type species
- Thelyssina sterrha Thelyssina sterrha

Genus of gastropods

Thelyssina is a genus of sea snails, marine gastropod mollusks in the family Seguenziidae.

== Description ==
The conical shell contains a peripheral carina but no axial riblets, spiral lirae or microsculpture. The U-shaped posterior sinus is shallow. The anterolateral sinus is a channel. The basal sinus is present. The columella has no sinus or tooth. The aperture has a rhomboidal shape. There are no data about the radula.

== Species ==
Species within the genus Thelyssina include:

- Thelyssina sterrha Marshall, 1983
