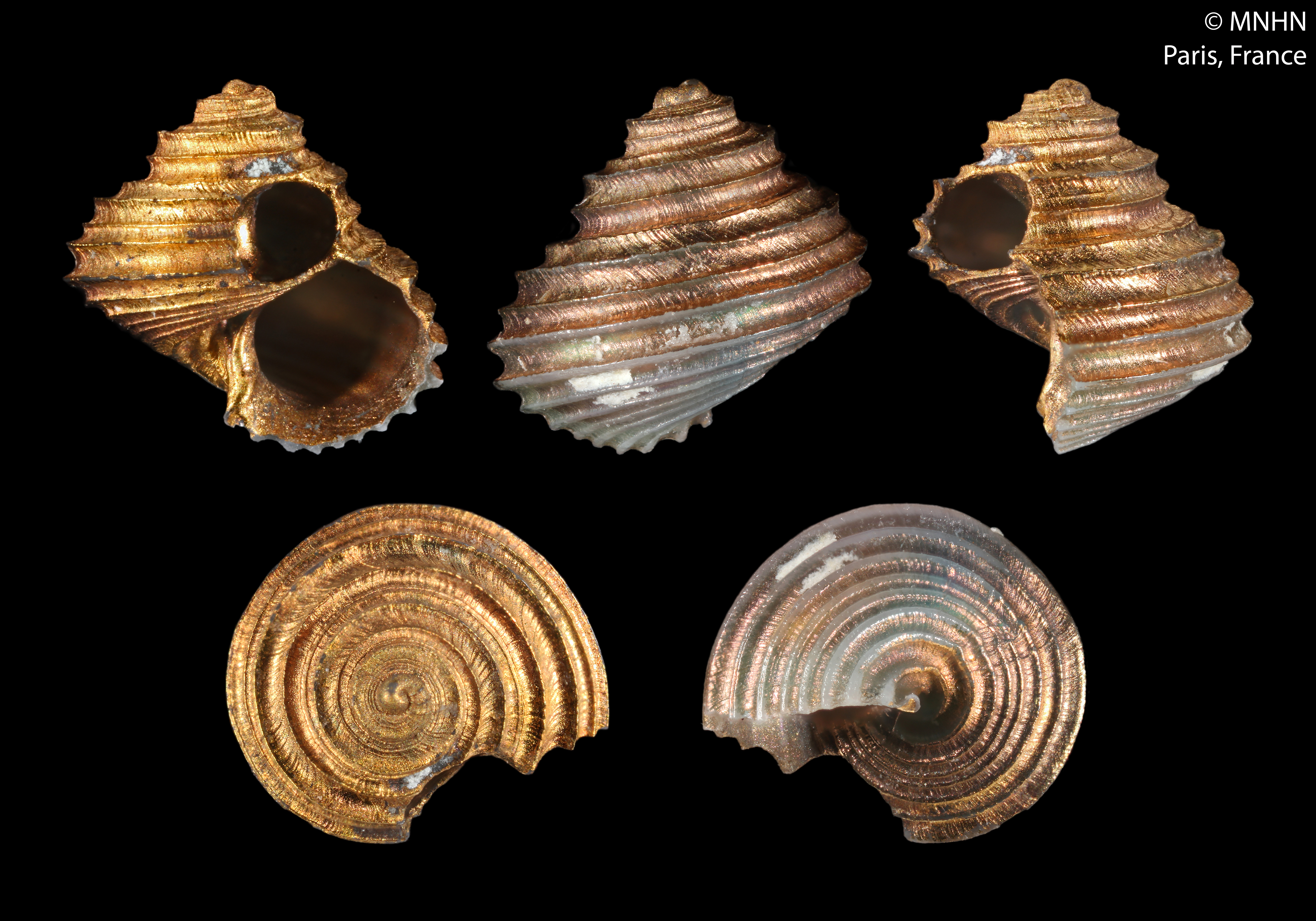

Scientific classification
- Kingdom: Animalia
- Phylum: Mollusca
- Class: Gastropoda
- Subclass: Vetigastropoda
- Order: Trochida
- Family: Calliostomatidae
- Genus: Carinastele
- Species: C. wareni

Binomial name
- Carinastele wareni Vilvens, 2014

= Carinastele wareni =

Species of gastropod

Carinastele wareni is a species of sea snail, a marine gastropod mollusc, in the family Calliostomatidae within the superfamily Trochoidea, the top snails, turban snails and their allies.

== Distribution ==
This species occurs in Madagascar.
