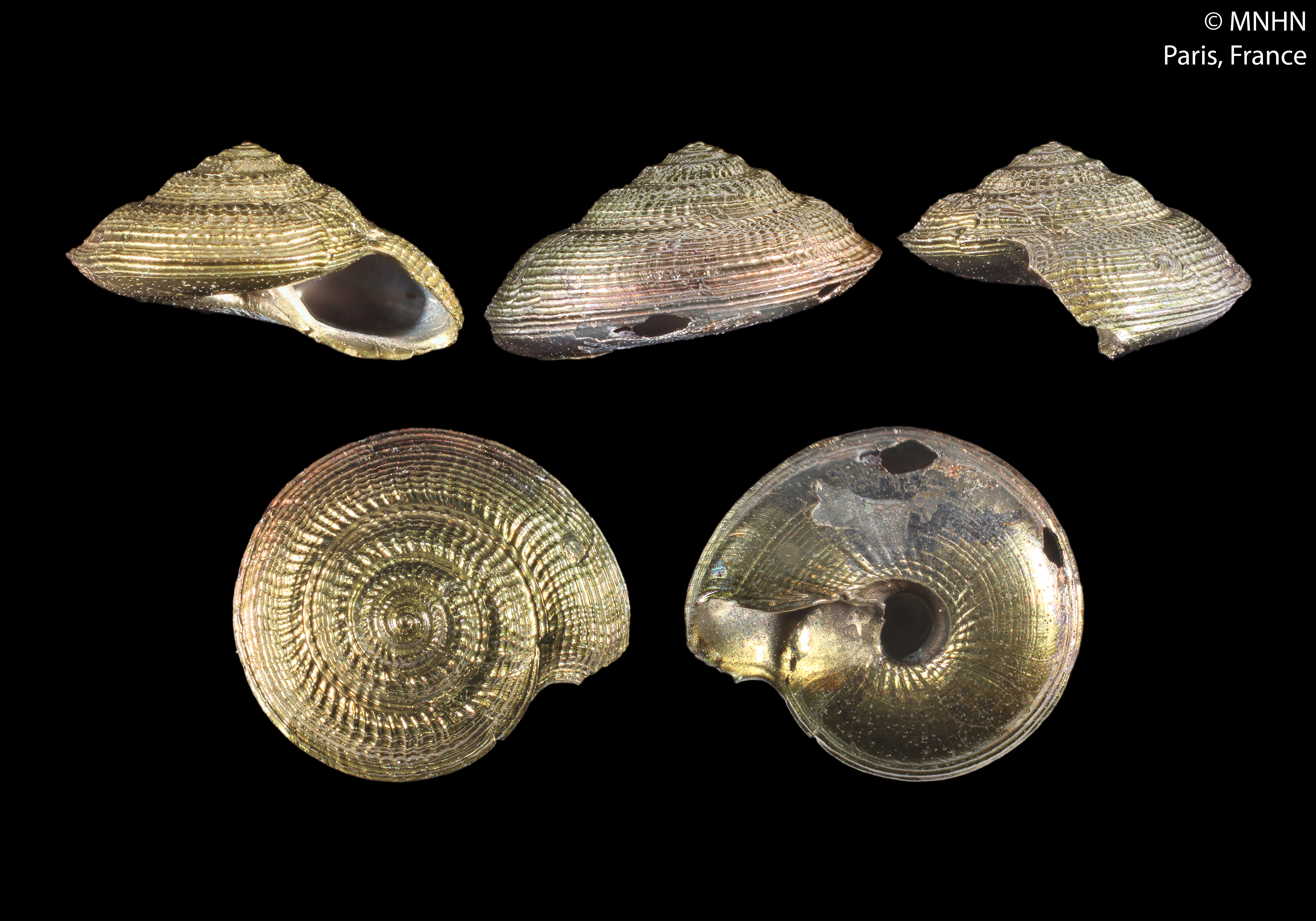
- Shell of Eratasthelys corona

Scientific classification
- Kingdom: Animalia
- Phylum: Mollusca
- Class: Gastropoda
- Subclass: Vetigastropoda
- Superfamily: Seguenzioidea
- Family: Seguenziidae
- Subfamily: Asthelysinae
- Genus: Eratasthelys; Marshall, 1991

= Eratasthelys =

Genus of gastropods

Eratasthelys is a genus of extremely small deep water sea snails, marine gastropod mollusks in the family Seguenziidae.

== Species ==
Species within the genus Eratasthelys include:

- Eratasthelys corona Marshall, 1991
