= Fluxinella vitrea =

Scientific classification
- Kingdom: Animalia
- Phylum: Mollusca
- Class: Gastropoda
- Subclass: Vetigastropoda
- Superfamily: Seguenzioidea
- Family: Seguenziidae
- Subfamily: Seguenziinae
- Genus: Fluxinella
- Species: F. vitrea

Binomial name
- Fluxinella vitrea (Okutani, 1968)

Synonyms
- Fluxiella vitrea Okutani, 1968

Species of gastropod

Fluxinella vitrea is a species of extremely small deep water sea snail, a marine gastropod mollusk in the family Seguenziidae.
