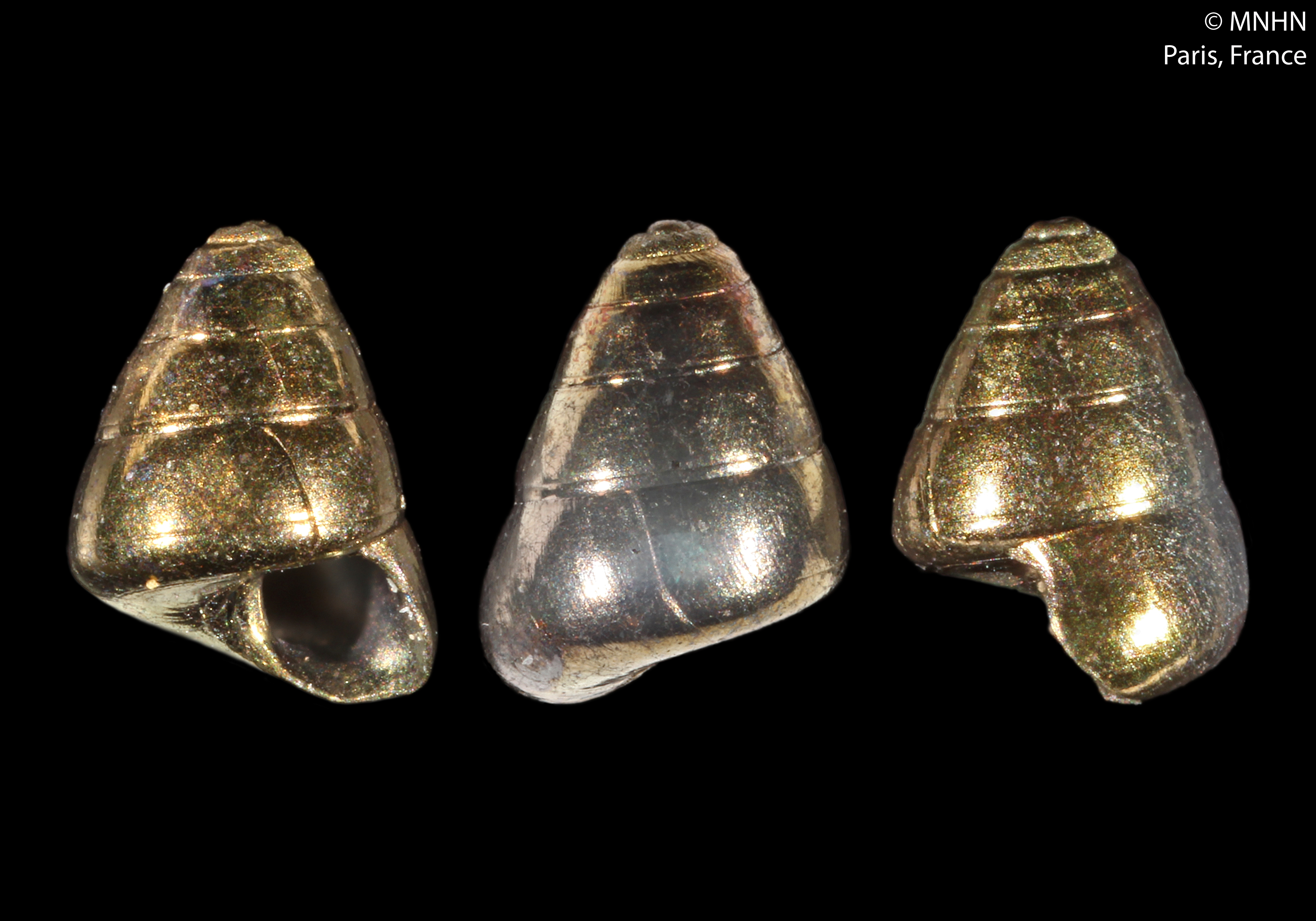
- Shell of Anxietas inspirata

Scientific classification
- Kingdom: Animalia
- Phylum: Mollusca
- Class: Gastropoda
- Subclass: Vetigastropoda
- Superfamily: Seguenzioidea
- Family: Seguenziidae
- Subfamily: Asthelysinae
- Genus: Anxietas; Iredale, 1917

Type species
- Anxietas perplexa Iredale, 1917

= Anxietas =

Genus of gastropods

Anxietas is a genus of extremely small deep water sea snails, marine gastropod mollusks in the family Seguenziidae.

== Species ==
Species within the genus Anxietas include:

- Anxietas exigua Marshall, 1991
- Anxietas inspirata Marshall, 1991
- Anxietas perplexa Iredale, 1917
