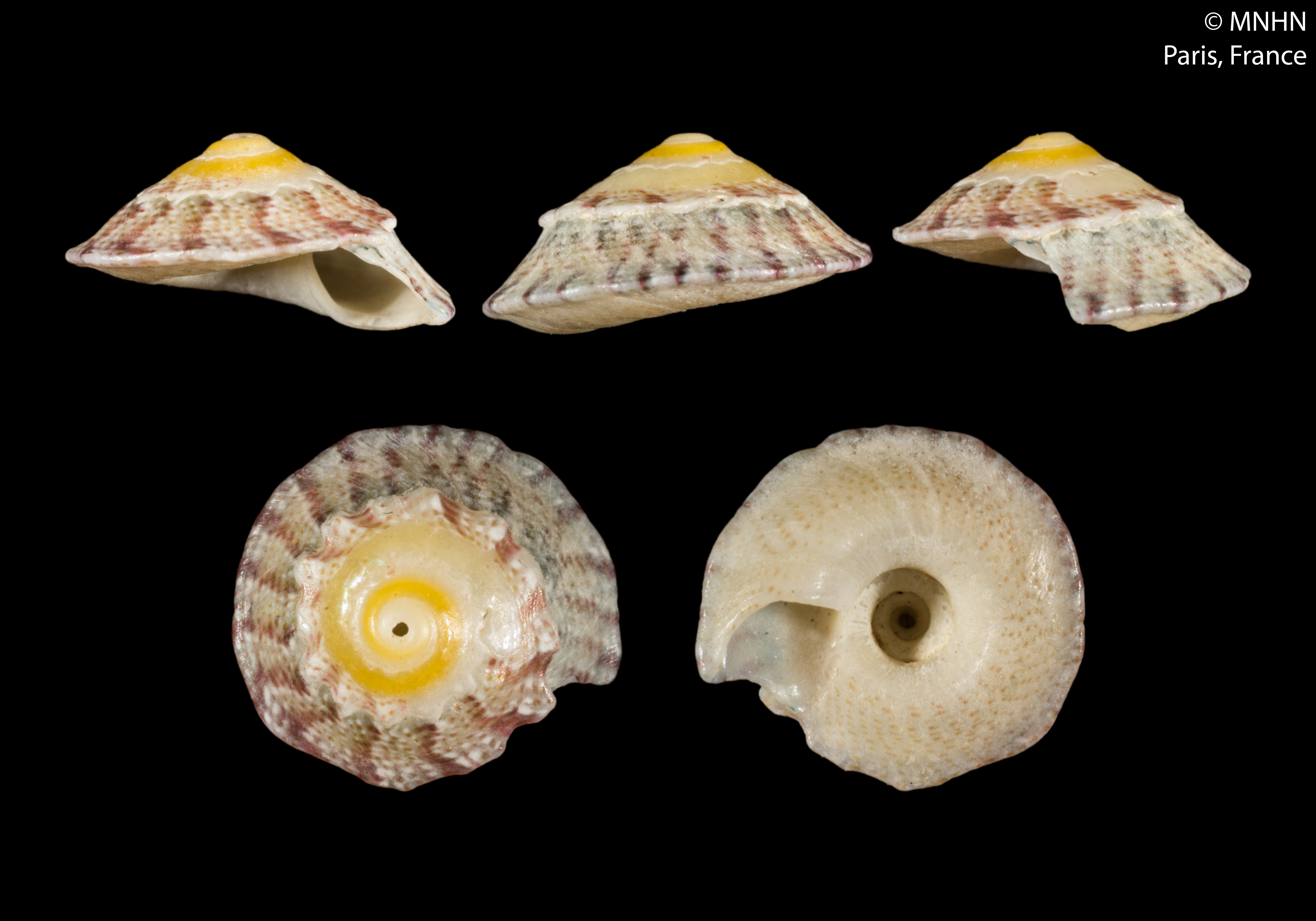
- Shell of Fluxinella stellaris (holotype at MNHN, Paris)

Scientific classification
- Kingdom: Animalia
- Phylum: Mollusca
- Class: Gastropoda
- Subclass: Vetigastropoda
- Family: Seguenziidae
- Genus: Fluxinella
- Species: F. stellaris

Binomial name
- Fluxinella stellaris Bozzetti, 2008

= Fluxinella stellaris =

Species of gastropod

Fluxinella stellaris is a species of sea snail and marine gastropod mollusk. It belongs to the family Seguenziidae and is classified as a species.

The taxonomic tree for Fluxinella stellaris is as follows:

- Domain: Animalia
- Kingdom: Animalia
- Phylum: Gastropoda
- Class: Gastropoda
- Order: Seguenziida
- Family: Seguenziidae

Fluxinella stellaris was first described in 2008 by Bozzetti and is originally from the southern Madagascar.

== Description ==
The size of the shell varies between 6 mm and 9 mm.

== Distribution ==
This species occurs in the Indian Ocean off Madagascar.
