= Carinastele coronata =

Scientific classification
- Kingdom: Animalia
- Phylum: Mollusca
- Class: Gastropoda
- Subclass: Vetigastropoda
- Order: Trochida
- Family: Calliostomatidae
- Genus: Carinastele
- Species: C. coronata

Binomial name
- Carinastele coronata Marshall, 1988

Species of gastropod

Carinastele coronata is a species of sea snail, a marine gastropod mollusc in the family Calliostomatidae.

== Distribution ==
This marine species occurs off New Zealand at a depth of about 800 m.
