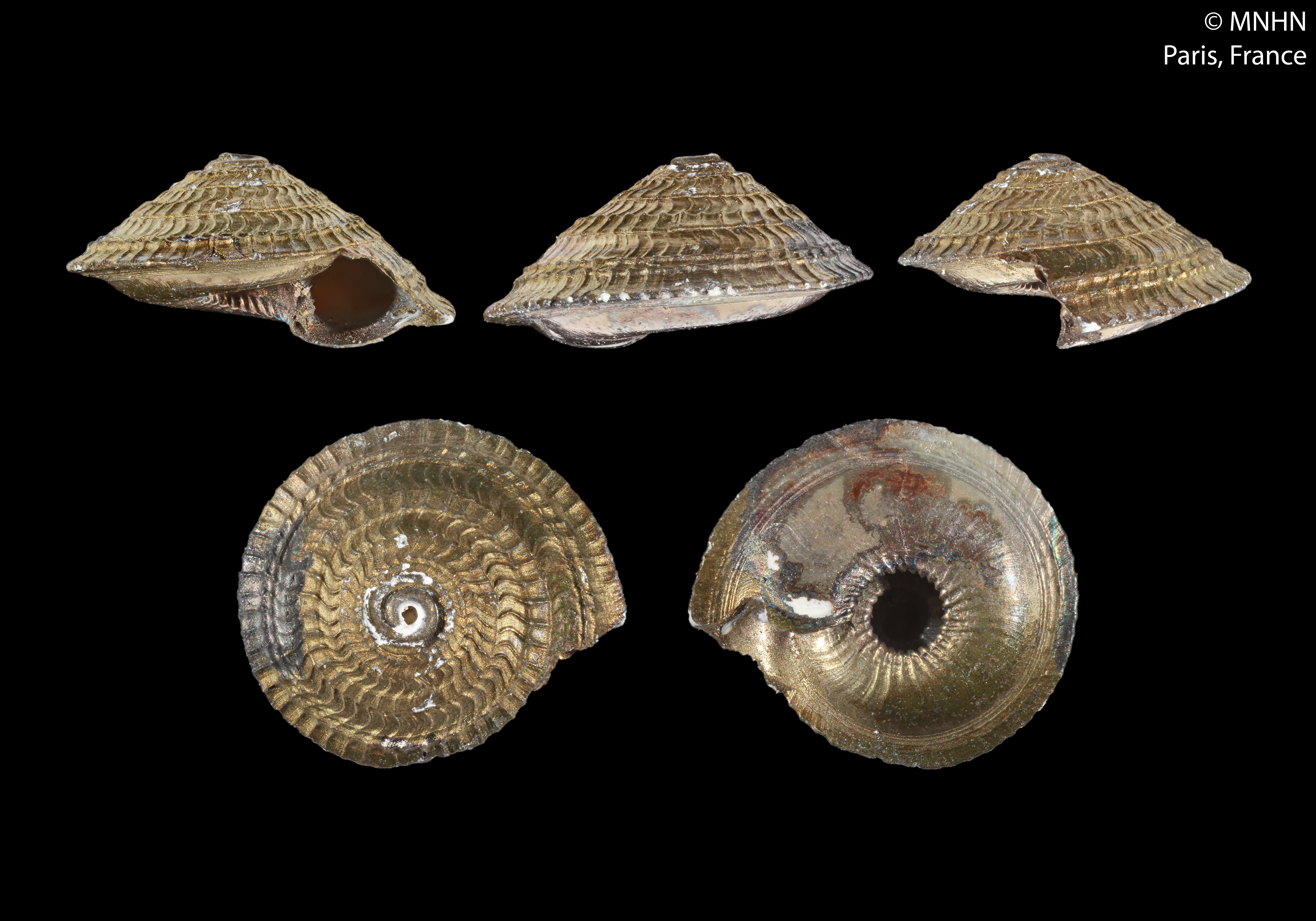
- Shell of Fluxinella tenera (holotype at MNHN, Paris)

Scientific classification
- Kingdom: Animalia
- Phylum: Mollusca
- Class: Gastropoda
- Subclass: Vetigastropoda
- Superfamily: Seguenzioidea
- Family: Seguenziidae
- Subfamily: Seguenziinae
- Genus: Fluxinella
- Species: F. tenera

Binomial name
- Fluxinella tenera Marshall, 1991

= Fluxinella tenera =

Species of gastropod

Fluxinella tenera is a species of extremely small deep water sea snail, a marine gastropod mollusk in the family Seguenziidae.

== Description ==
The length of the shell attains 4.6 mm. The shell is very wide. The protoconch reaches around 300 µm in width. The teleoconch has around 4.8 whorls traversed by narrow and widely spread axial riblets. It is angular and the base is contracted below periphery. The inner base has three spinal cords and axial ribs that enlarge around a large umbilicus that comprises 22.8% of the shell diameter. This species has a subtrapezoidal aperture with a concave posterior notch, a peripheral notch in the keel, and a thick inner lip with a rounded keel bordering a concave basal channel.

== Distribution ==
This marine species occurs off New Caledonia, at 3680-3700 meters below sea level.
