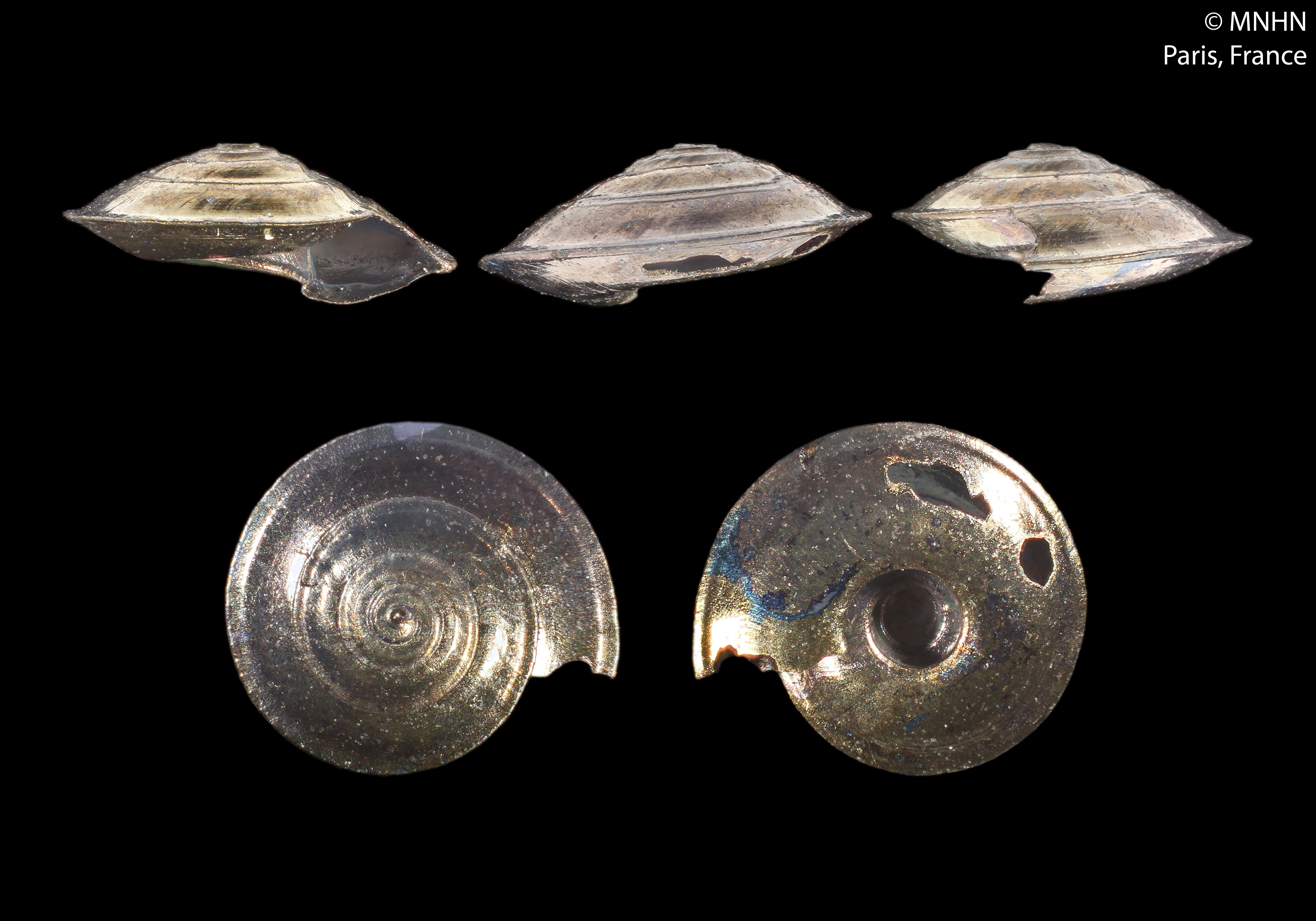
- Shell of Fluxinella membranacea (holotype at MNHN, Paris)

Scientific classification
- Kingdom: Animalia
- Phylum: Mollusca
- Class: Gastropoda
- Subclass: Vetigastropoda
- Superfamily: Seguenzioidea
- Family: Seguenziidae
- Subfamily: Seguenziinae
- Genus: Fluxinella
- Species: F. membranacea

Binomial name
- Fluxinella membranacea B. A. Marshall, 1991

= Fluxinella membranacea =

Species of sea snail

Fluxinella membranacea is a species of extremely small deep water sea snail, a marine gastropod mollusk in the family Seguenziidae.

== Description ==
The size of the shell varies between 2.5 mm and 3.4 mm. Its shell has "a smooth spire, flattened summit, persistent shoulder angulation, and distinctly overhung umbilical wall."

== Distribution ==
This marine species occurs off the Philippines and New Caledonia.
