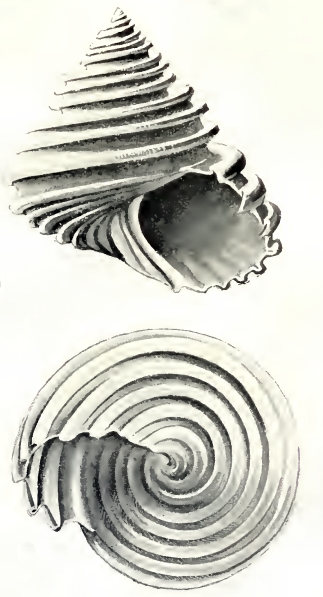
- Drawing with two views of a shell of Carinastele niceterium

Scientific classification
- Kingdom: Animalia
- Phylum: Mollusca
- Class: Gastropoda
- Subclass: Vetigastropoda
- Order: Trochida
- Family: Calliostomatidae
- Subfamily: Thysanodontinae
- Genus: Carinastele; Marshall, 1988

Type species
- Carinastele kristelleae Marshall, B.A., 1988

= Carinastele =

Genus of gastropods

Carinastele is a genus of sea snails, marine gastropod molluscs in the family Calliostomatidae.

== Species ==
Species within the genus Carinastele include:

- Carinastele coronata Marshall, 1988
- Carinastele jugosa Marshall, 1988
- Carinastele kristelleae Marshall, 1988
- Carinastele niceterium (Hedley & May, 1908)
- Carinastele wareni Vilvens, 2014
