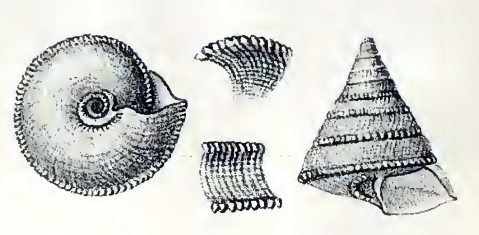
- Drawing with two views of a shell of Basilissa superba

Scientific classification
- Kingdom: Animalia
- Phylum: Mollusca
- Class: Gastropoda
- Subclass: Vetigastropoda
- Superfamily: Seguenzioidea
- Family: Seguenziidae
- Subfamily: Seguenziinae
- Genus: Basilissa
- Species: B. superba

Binomial name
- Basilissa superba Watson, 1879

= Basilissa superba =

Species of gastropod

Basilissa superba is a species of extremely small deep water sea snail, a marine gastropod mollusk in the family Seguenziidae.

== Description ==
The height of this species attains 20 mm. The high, flat-based, cream-colored shell has a concavely conical shape. It is sharply angulated, thin, and finely reticulated. It shows a very faint nacre.

Sculpture: There are about twenty delicate threads, very nearly but not quite regular in thickness or distance, on the upper part of the body whorl. They slowly decrease in number on the previous whorls. The two (or three) which form the carina are thrown out a little on a projecting whitish fillet, which encircles the base of the whorls. This whitish fillet extends to the base, when it forms a narrow obliquely-corrugated edging. On the base there are about thirty spirals, more crowded, flattened, and irregular than above, and the edge of the umbilicus is defined by another whitish fillet, ornamented with about thirty oblong beads. One or two smaller and more faintly beaded threads lie within the edge of the umbilicus.

Longitudinals: There are of these on the last whorl about 120. They are flexuous, marking the lines of growth, rather stronger, more regular and more distant than the spirals, which run over the top of them and form little white nodes at the crossings. The intersections of these two systems cut the whole surface into rhombic reticulations, whose breadth is about 0.28 mm and their height 0.15 mm. The longitudinal threads themselves are about 0.13 mm and the spirals about 0.077 mm broad. On the base, the longitudinals are flattened and spread out into undulations.

Color: creamy, on a dull polished surface, with a faint nacreous gleam which is pearly within the mouth. The apex is ruddy.

The spire is high and conical with slightly concave slopes. The apex is broken. On the upper whorls the longitudinals are strong, while the spirals are obsolete, except the carinal fillet, which projects bluntly above the suture. The 14 whorls show a very regular increase. They are very slightly convex, sharply acute-angled at the carina. The base of the shell is flat at the outer edge and barely convex in the middle, with a slight dip in toward the edge of the umbilicus which is strongly defined. The suture is linear, defined by the white carinal fillet, and also on the lower whorls by being very slightly impressed. The aperture is perpendicular, rhomboidal, the basal and palatal lines being parallel, the other two are somewhat diverging and curved, broader than high. The outer lip is sharp and thin, not patulous, not descending, with a shallow open sinus below the suture, then, about the middle of the whorl, it advances with a rounded sweep, retreating sharply across the carina to form the open rounded basal sinus toward the outer edge of the base. The columellar lip is sharp and thin. It rises from the body a good way within the edge of the umbilicus. It retreats so as to form a sinus, and then it bends over a little on the umbilicus, and it forms a sharp angle projecting into a tooth at the extreme point of the pillar. The umbilicus is strong, deep, abrupt, there being on the base only a very slight dip in toward it and it is defined by the white-beaded fillet. Within, besides the two spiral lines, there are slight longitudinal striations, and the inner edge of the whorls twines like a staircase round it, but concealed by the overcurve of the columellar lip.

== Distribution ==
This marine species occurs off Northeast Australia.
