= Carinastele kristelleae =

Scientific classification
- Kingdom: Animalia
- Phylum: Mollusca
- Class: Gastropoda
- Subclass: Vetigastropoda
- Order: Trochida
- Family: Calliostomatidae
- Genus: Carinastele
- Species: C. kristelleae

Binomial name
- Carinastele kristelleae Marshall, 1988

Species of gastropod

Carinastele kristelleae is a species of sea snail, a marine gastropod mollusc in the family Calliostomatidae.

== Distribution ==
This marine species occurs off New Zealand at depths between 126 m and 274 m.
