= Fluxinella stenomphala =

Scientific classification
- Kingdom: Animalia
- Phylum: Mollusca
- Class: Gastropoda
- Subclass: Vetigastropoda
- Superfamily: Seguenzioidea
- Family: Seguenziidae
- Subfamily: Seguenziinae
- Genus: Fluxinella
- Species: F. stenomphala

Binomial name
- Fluxinella stenomphala (Melvill, 1910)

Species of gastropod

Fluxinella stenomphala is a species of extremely small deep water sea snail, a marine gastropod mollusk in the family Seguenziidae.
