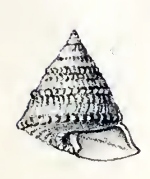
- Drawing with an apertural view of a shell of Hadroconus altus

Scientific classification
- Kingdom: Animalia
- Phylum: Mollusca
- Class: Gastropoda
- Subclass: Vetigastropoda
- Superfamily: Seguenzioidea
- Family: Seguenziidae
- Subfamily: Seguenziinae
- Genus: Hadroconus; Quin 1987

Type species
- Basilissa alta R. B. Watson, 1879

= Hadroconus =

Genus of gastropods

Hadroconus is a genus of sea snails, marine gastropod mollusks in the family Seguenziidae.

== Species ==
Species within the genus Hadroconus include:

- Hadroconus altus (Watson, 1879)
- Hadroconus diadematus Marshall, 1988
- Hadroconus grandiosus Marshall, 1991
- Hadroconus sibogae (Schepman, 1908)
- Hadroconus watsoni (Dall, 1927)
