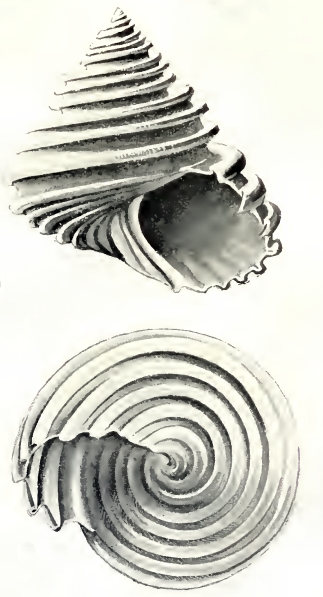
- Original image with two views of a shell of Carinastele niceterium

Scientific classification
- Kingdom: Animalia
- Phylum: Mollusca
- Class: Gastropoda
- Subclass: Vetigastropoda
- Order: Trochida
- Family: Calliostomatidae
- Genus: Carinastele
- Species: C. niceterium

Binomial name
- Carinastele niceterium (Hedley & May, 1908)

Synonyms
- Basilissa niceterium Hedley & May, 1908

= Carinastele niceterium =

Species of gastropod

Carinastele niceterium is a species of sea snail, a marine gastropod mollusc in the family Calliostomatidae.

== Description ==
(Original description by Hedley & May) The height of the shell attains 7 mm. The thin, imperforate shell has a conical-turbinate shape. Its colour uniform is pale cream and of silken lustre. The shell contains 5½ whorl, including a small pointed obliquely set protoconch of 1½ whorl.

Sculpture : prominent spiral keels, three to the penultimate, ten to the body whorl, successively diminishing from the suture to the base. They are undercut below the narrow summit, parted by much broader flat interstices. These keels, apparently folds in the shell substance, are microscopically beaded by fine radial striae, represented in the interstices as hair lines. The protoconch does not share the adult sculpture, but is minutely malleated. The oblique aperture is subcircular. The glazed columella is arched, running out to a spur. The outer lip is unfinished, the ends of the ribs projecting beyond the interstices like claws. In the throat a furrow corresponds to each external keel.
