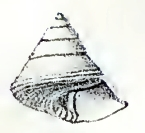
- Drawing with an apertural view of a shell of Asthelys munda

Scientific classification
- Kingdom: Animalia
- Phylum: Mollusca
- Class: Gastropoda
- Subclass: Vetigastropoda
- Family: Seguenziidae
- Genus: Asthelys
- Species: A. munda

Binomial name
- Asthelys munda (Watson, 1879)

Synonyms
- Basilissa munda Watson, 1879 (basionym); Trochus (Margarita) infundibulum Watson 1879

= Asthelys munda =

Species of gastropod

Asthelys munda is a species of sea snail, a marine gastropod mollusk in the family Seguenziidae.

This species is spelled as Asthelys mundus in CLEMAM.

== Description ==
(Original description by Watson) The height of the shell attains 3.3 mm. The shell is broadly conical, flat on the base, and sharply angulated. It is small, thin, delicate, smooth, glossy, and nacreous under a thin white calcareous surface.

Sculpture: There are longitudinals, which are very faint but still sharp, sinuated, showing the old lines of growth. There are over the whole surface very faint traces of spirals. At the bottom of each whorl, about 0.25 mm. above the suture, is a sharp narrow thread, which on the body whorl is bordered below by a second, rather higher and sharper, which forms the carina, and which on the spire is buried by the overlap of the succeeding whorl. On the base of the shell there are about eleven fine spirals, within which is a strong furrow, and a projecting, crenulated, or ropelike thread forming the edge of the umbilicus.

The colour of the shell is opalescent, from the underlying nacre shining through the polished, thin, translucent calcareous layer of the surface.

The spire is high and conical. The apex is flattened, with the minute smooth embryonic 1½ whorl slightly projecting. The 6 whorls show a regular and slow increase (but the specimen is not full-grown). The spire is perfectly flat, the slope being scarcely broken by the suprasutural thread. The suture is linear, almost invisible. The aperture is perpendicular, irregularly rectangular, broader than high. The outer lip is sharp and thin, with a slight open sinus. It is sharply angled at the periphery, slightly arched across the base, apparently nicked at the point of the columella. The inner lip is arched, strengthened by a thin pad, reverted on the umbilicus so as to leave a groove behind it, with a slight tooth in front. From the body it bends very much over to the left, so as largely to cover the umbilicus. It then advances straight and is toothed in front. The umbilicus is small, oblique-edged, with a crenulated margin (described as Basilissa munda).

== Distribution ==
This marine species occurs in European waters off the Canary Islands.
