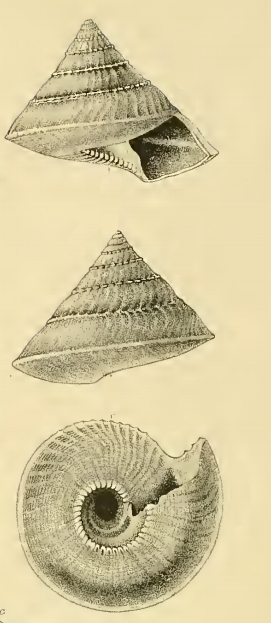
- Original drawing with three views of a shell of Hadroconus sibogae

Scientific classification
- Kingdom: Animalia
- Phylum: Mollusca
- Class: Gastropoda
- Subclass: Vetigastropoda
- Superfamily: Seguenzioidea
- Family: Seguenziidae
- Subfamily: Seguenziinae
- Genus: Hadroconus
- Species: H. sibogae

Binomial name
- Hadroconus sibogae (Schepman, 1908)

Synonyms
- Basilissa sibogae Schepman, 1908 (original description)

= Hadroconus sibogae =

Species of gastropod

Hadroconus sibogae is a species of extremely small deep water sea snail, a marine gastropod mollusk in the family Seguenziidae.

== Description ==
(Original description by M. Schepman) The height of the shell attains 6.5 mm . The umbilicate shell has a conical shape with concave sides, a sharp keel and a slightly convex base. It is nacreous under a thin, yellowish-white layer. The 7 whorls are slightly convex, especially the lower ones. The nucleus is smooth and shining. The suture is well marked by the strong keel, which is also visible on the upper whorls. The sculpture consists on the upper whorls of thin, strongly curved, radiating riblets, which are rather crowded, but much more distant on the lower whorls, and nearly disappear on the last two. These riblets are slightly thickened towards the upper suture and below towards the keel, which is crenulate by their crossing it. One or two spiral elevated striae may be observed on part of the upper whorls. Moreover the whole shell is covered with fine growth striae, which form a large sinus above near the suture and are protracted below near the keel, following the direction of the riblets. The base of the shell is rather smooth, but sculptured by similar striae as on the upper part, being partly riblike. The whole base is covered with spiral striae, most conspicuous towards the umbilicus and keel, leaving a smoother median space. The pervious umbilicus is funnel-shaped. Its largest diameter occupies nearly ¼ of that of the base. Its margin is bordered by a strongly beaded rib, which can be followed still a little in its interior, which is otherwise rather smooth, though sculptured by very fine radiating and spiral striae. The aperture is rhombic. Its upper margin is thin, slightly broken, but judging after the growth striae, sinuous above, protracted towards the keel, which appears to have been tooth-like. The basal margin is sinuous in the same manner;. The columellar margin is sinuous, reflected, and forms an angle with the basal margin. The operculum is very thin, corneous, with few whorls.

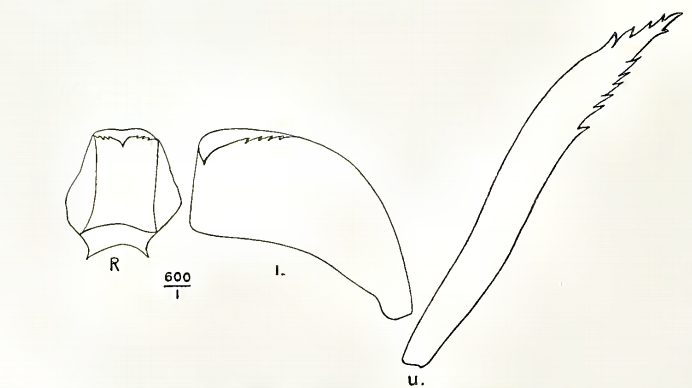
Radula of Hadroconus sibogae

The rhachidian tooth (R) of the radula has a subquadrate body, with rounded posterior corners, enlarged sides and a short, reflected cusp, with a few denticles. The lateral (l) is subtriangular, with a short, reflected cusp, with small denticles at the distal margin. I can detect no more teeth, belonging with certainty to the median part. The uncini (U) are long, slender, with distinct smaller teeth near the top. (described as Basilissa sibogae)

== Distribution ==
This marine species occurs off Sulawesi, Indonesia.
