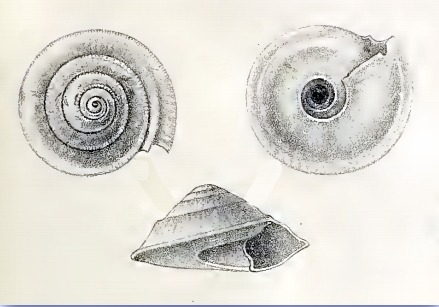
- Original drawing with three views of a shell of Fluxinella trochiformis

Scientific classification
- Kingdom: Animalia
- Phylum: Mollusca
- Class: Gastropoda
- Subclass: Vetigastropoda
- Superfamily: Seguenzioidea
- Family: Seguenziidae
- Subfamily: Seguenziinae
- Genus: Fluxinella
- Species: F. trochiformis

Binomial name
- Fluxinella trochiformis (Schepman, 1909)

Synonyms
- Basilissa trochiformis (Schepman, 1909); Fluxina trochiformis Schepman, 1909

= Fluxinella trochiformis =

Species of gastropod

Fluxinella trochiformis, common name the sundial top shell, is a species of extremely small deep water sea snail, a marine gastropod mollusc in the family Seguenziidae.

== Description ==
(Original description by M. Schepman) The height of the shell attains 2½ mm. The white, thin shell has a conic shape. It is sharply keeled. The spire contains 6 whorls. The nucleus is slightly umbilicate. The postnuclear whorls are nearly smooth. They show very fine curved growth striae. The whorls are nearly straight, but slightly convex in the upper part, slightly concave near the lower suture. The whorls are prominently keeled above the suture, the keel being finely crenulate. The base of the shell is a little convex, excavated towards the peripheral keel, with three fine spirals at some distance from the periphery and a few, scarcely visible ones towards the central part, moreover with numerous very fine curved growth striae. The umbilicus is moderately large, pervious, scalar, with a rib at its margin and a groove just around this rib. The aperture is subtriangular, its margins broken, the upper one convex, the basal one nearly straight. The short columellar margin is excavated, and angular below by the end of the umbilical rib. (described as Fluxina trochiformis)

== Distribution ==
This marine species occurs off Indonesia, Australia and Tasmania.
