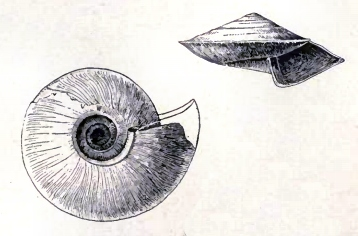
- Original drawing with two views of a shell of Fluxinella discula

Scientific classification
- Kingdom: Animalia
- Phylum: Mollusca
- Class: Gastropoda
- Subclass: Vetigastropoda
- Family: Seguenziidae
- Genus: Fluxinella
- Species: F. discula

Binomial name
- Fluxinella discula (Dall, 1889)

Synonyms
- Fluxina discula Dall, 1889 (original combination)

= Fluxinella discula =

Species of gastropod

Fluxinella discula is a species of sea snail, a marine gastropod mollusk in the family Seguenziidae.

== Description ==
The height of the shell attains 6.5 mm.

== Distribution ==
This species occurs in the Gulf of Mexico off Texas, in the Caribbean Sea off Cuba and Domenica.
