= Fluxinella gelida =

Scientific classification
- Kingdom: Animalia
- Phylum: Mollusca
- Class: Gastropoda
- Subclass: Vetigastropoda
- Superfamily: Seguenzioidea
- Family: Seguenziidae
- Subfamily: Seguenziinae
- Genus: Fluxinella
- Species: F. gelida

Binomial name
- Fluxinella gelida (Barnard, 1963)

Synonyms
- Basilissa gelida Barnard, 1963 (original combination)

Species of gastropod

Fluxinella gelida is a species of extremely small deep water sea snail, a marine gastropod mollusk in the family Seguenziidae.

== Distribution ==
This marine species occurs in the South African part of the South Atlantic Ocean.
