= Hadroconus watsoni =

Scientific classification
- Kingdom: Animalia
- Phylum: Mollusca
- Class: Gastropoda
- Subclass: Vetigastropoda
- Superfamily: Seguenzioidea
- Family: Seguenziidae
- Subfamily: Seguenziinae
- Genus: Hadroconus
- Species: H. watsoni

Binomial name
- Hadroconus watsoni (Dall, 1927)

Synonyms
- Basilmissa superba Watson, 1889 (young specimen); Basilissa watsoni Dall, 1927 (original description)

Species of gastropod

Hadroconus watsoni is a species of extremely small deep water sea snail, a marine gastropod mollusk in the family Seguenziidae.

== Description ==
(Original description by W.H. Dall) The height of the shell attains 5 mm. The small, white shell has a flatly conical shape, with a glassy minute nucleus of one whorl and seven subsequent whorls. The suture is closely appressed, not impressed. The whorls above the base are flat. The axial sculpture consists of many protractively flexuous extremely fine lines with wider interspaces over all the whorls. The cemented edges at the suture by their opacity look like a presutural band, but this is not reflected in the sculpture. The spiral sculpture on the spire consists of almost microscopic close striae. On the base there are about a dozen fine spiral grooves between the edge of the umbilicus and the periphery, a little coarser near the carina. The base of the shell is nearly flat, and sharply carinate at the periphery. The umbilicus is funicular, deep, the verge carinate. The aperture is quadrate, slightly oblique. Its margin is thin, sharp, and simple.

== Distribution ==
This species occurs in the Atlantic Ocean off the coast of Georgia, USA.
