= Asthelysinae =

Scientific classification
- Kingdom: Animalia
- Phylum: Mollusca
- Class: Gastropoda
- Subclass: Vetigastropoda
- Family: Seguenziidae
- Subfamily: Asthelysinae; B. A. Marshall, 1991

Asthelysinae is a subfamily of snails within the family Seguenziidae. It was described by B.A. Marshall in 1991.

== Genera ==
Asthelysinae includes four genera:

- Anxietas Iredale, 1917
- Asthelys Quinn, 1987
- Eratasthelys B. A. Marshall, 1991
- Thelyssina B. A. Marshall, 1983
