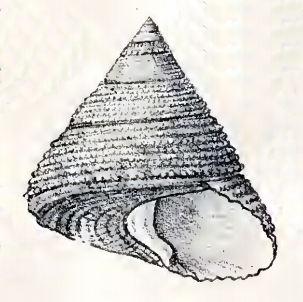
- Drawing of a shell of Astele armillata

Scientific classification
- Kingdom: Animalia
- Phylum: Mollusca
- Class: Gastropoda
- Subclass: Vetigastropoda
- Order: Trochida
- Family: Calliostomatidae
- Subfamily: Calliostomatinae
- Genus: Astele; Swainson, 1855

Synonyms
- Callistele Cotton & Godfrey, 1935; Coralastele Iredale, 1930; Eutrochus A. Adams, 1864; Salsipotens Iredale, 1924

= Astele =

Genus of gastropods

Astele is a genus of sea snails, marine gastropod mollusks in the family Calliostomatidae.

Some authors use Astele Swainson, 1855 as a subgenus in Calliostoma Swainson, 1840 and in Astele Swainson, 1855

== Species ==
Species within the genus Astele include:

- Astele allanae (Iredale, 1930)
- Astele armillata (Wood, 1828)
- †Astele boileaui Marwick, 1931
- Astele bularra Garrard, 1961
- Astele ciliaris (Menke, 1843)
- Astele monile (Reeve, 1863)
- Astele multigrana (Dunker, 1871)
- Astele pulcherrima (Sowerby III, 1914)
- Astele punctocostata (A. Adams, 1853)
- Astele rubiginosa (Valenciennes, 1846)
- Astele scitula (A. Adams, 1854)
- Astele similaris (Reeve, 1863)
- Astele speciosa (A. Adams in H. Adams & A. Adams, 1854)
- Astele stenomphala E. A. Smith, 1898
- Astele subcarinata (Swainson, 1854)

Species brought into synonymy

- Astele bilix Hedley, 1905: synonym of Calliobasis bilix (Hedley, 1905)
- Astele calliston Verco, 1905: synonym of Callistele calliston (Verco, 1905)
- Astele ciliare [sic]: synonym of Astele ciliaris (Menke, 1843)
- Astele multigranum [sic]: synonym of Astele multigrana (Dunker, 1871)
- Astele nobilis Hirase, 1922: synonym of Calliostoma nobile (Hirase, 1922)
