= Quinnia ionica =

Scientific classification
- Kingdom: Animalia
- Phylum: Mollusca
- Class: Gastropoda
- Subclass: Vetigastropoda
- Family: Seguenziidae
- Genus: Quinnia
- Species: Q. ionica

Binomial name
- Quinnia ionica (Watson, 1878)

Synonyms
- Seguenzia ionica Watson, 1878 (original description)

Species of gastropod

Quinnia ionica is a species of sea snail, a marine gastropod mollusk in the family Seguenziidae.

It was so called by Watson from its resemblance to the volute of the Ionic capital.

== Description ==
(Original description by Watson) The height of the shell attains 4.6 mm. The smooth, depressed shell has a conical shape. It is sharply carinate, spirally lirate, and smooth.

Sculpture: There is a sharp carina at the periphery. Above this is a spiral liration formed by a sharp angulation, which on the upper whorls lies near the suture, but on the later whorls lies nearer the carina. The carina is margined below by a broad, shallow, round furrow, which is defined on its inner side by a sharp spiral thread. The umbilicus is defined by a sharp thread, outside of which is a shallow furrow and two or three more spiral threads. The centre of the base is nearly smooth, but has also some feeble spirals, which increase in strength toward the outside and toward the centre. Besides these, the whole surface is covered with sharp, not approximate, microscopic spirals.

Longitudinals: tTere are numerous distinct lines of growth, which on the second whorl are like minute radiating spokes, and in the superior sinus (i. e. between the suture and the first spiral) are sharp and distinct, and more remote than elsewhere on the surface, except on the base round the umbilicus, where, though less sharp, they are even more distinct.

Colour: a dead chalky white, with an exquisite pearly nacre below the outside layer and within the shell.

The spire is low and scalar. The apex is flattened, the embryonic 1½ whorl, though somewhat tumid and large for the genus, being somewhat immersed. The 7 whorls show a regular and slow increase until the last, which increases somewhat more rapidly. Angulated above, tumid on the base, where (unlike Carenzia carinata (Jeffreys, 1877)) the edge of the umbilicus is the most projecting part. The suture is linear, very minute, but defined by a very slight shelf, which projects horizontally just below it. The aperture is perpendicular, squarish, buttoo much broken for description. The lines of growth on the outer lip show it to have the same three sinuses as those described in Seguenzia formosa Jeffreys, 1876. The columellar margin is patulous, a little reverted, scarcely twisted, with a broad deep sinus above, a strong, but not sharp, twisted tooth projecting at about three-fourths of its length, below which is a smaller sinus running out into a point at the extreme end of the columella. The umbilicus is large, funnel-shaped, and deep. It is sharply defined by the edge of the base, the spiral of which runs out to the point of the columellar margin. Within the umbilicus is a strongish undefined spiral furrow answering to the columellar tooth, and the lines of growth are strongly defined.

== Distribution ==
This species occurs in the Atlantic Ocean off the Azores and in the Gulf of Mexico, off Puerto Rico.
