= Laetifautor =

Scientific classification
- Kingdom: Animalia
- Phylum: Mollusca
- Class: Gastropoda
- Subclass: Vetigastropoda
- Order: Trochida
- Superfamily: Trochoidea
- Family: Calliostomatidae
- Subfamily: Calliostomatinae
- Genus: Laetifautor; Iredale, 1929

Type species
- Calliostoma trepidum Hedley, 1907

Synonyms
- Calliostoma (Spicator) Cotton & Godfrey, 1935; Spicator Cotton & Godfrey, 1935

Genus of gastropods

Laetifautor is a genus of sea snails, marine gastropod mollusks in the family Calliostomatidae.

== Species ==
Species within the genus Laetifautor include:

- Laetifautor deceptus (E.A. Smith, 1898)
- Laetifautor elegans Habe, 1960
- Laetifautor fundatus Marshall, 1995
- Laetifautor rubropunctatus (A. Adams, 1851)
- Laetifautor spinulosus (Tate, 1893)
- Laetifautor unicarinata Fischer, 1879

Species brought into synonymy

- Laetifautor amakusaensis Habe in Azuma & Toki, 1968: synonym of Laetifautor elegans Habe, 1960
- Laetifautor monilis (Reeve, 1863): synonym of Astele monile (Reeve, 1863)
- Laetifautor ornatissimus (Schepman, 1908): synonym of Ethminolia ornatissima (Schepman, 1908)
- Laetifautor scobinatus (Reeve, 1863): synonym of Calliostoma scobinatum (A. Adams in Reeve, 1863)
- Laetifautor simulans (Smith, 1899): synonym of Maurea simulans (B. A. Marshall, 1994)
- Laetifautor spinulosum (Tate, 1893): synonym of Laetifautor spinulosus (Tate, 1893)
- Laetifautor trepidus (Hedley, 1907): synonym of Laetifautor deceptus (E.A. Smith, 1898)
