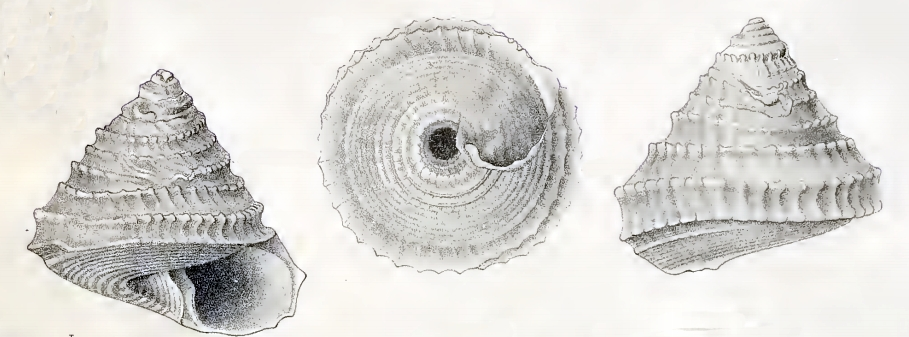
- Original drawing with three views of a shell of Carenzia melvilli

Scientific classification
- Kingdom: Animalia
- Phylum: Mollusca
- Class: Gastropoda
- Subclass: Vetigastropoda
- Superfamily: Seguenzioidea
- Family: Seguenziidae
- Subfamily: Seguenziinae
- Genus: Carenzia
- Species: C. melvilli

Binomial name
- Carenzia melvilli (Schepman, 1909)

Synonyms
- Seguenzia melvilli Schepman, 1909

= Carenzia melvilli =

Species of gastropod

Carenzia melvilli is a species of small deep water sea snails, a marine gastropod mollusk in the family Seguenziidae.

== Description ==
=== Shell ===
It has a conical, scalar, umbilicate, whitish shell. It is moderately large for its genus with a height of 4.5 mm.

It contains seven whorls. The nucleus is wanting. The upper whorls are eroded, while the lower ones each contain three spiral lirae. The upper one runs at a little distance from the shallow but distinct suture, which is slightly undulate. From the first liration to the second, the shell is slightly convex, this latter liration is strong, prominent and divides the whorls in two subequal parts. Below this liration the shell is concave towards the basal or peripheral liration, which in the upper whorls, runs just in the suture and in the last one borders the basal surface. These lirations are slightly spinous. Distinct undulating plications run from one to the other of the lower lirae, with the convex side towards the aperture

On the upper part they are directed in an opposite way, less distinct about halfway along the interspace between the upper and median liration. Moreover, the whole shell is covered with much weaker striae, having the character of growth striae and traces of more remote spiral striae. The basal face of the shell is subconvex, but flat in the centre, with a shallow groove between the peripheral keel and the first of the basal lirae. This space is rather smooth, though crossed by plicae running from the peripheral spines in an oblique direction.

The outermost of the basal lirae, which is not broad, is followed by two similar ones, about as strong as their interstices. The central ones, five in number, increase in breadth towards the centre, (one of them nearly double) and are larger than the interstices. These lirae are connected by small radiating riblets in the interstices.

The umbilicus is bordered by a liration, consisting of a row of subquadrate beads This umbilicus is pervious and funnel-shaped. Its wall is radiately striated and has one faint spiral rib. The aperture is rounded-subquadrate. Its right margin is incomplete. Its columellar margin is curved, with a denticle in the basal part. It is slightly reflected over the umbilicus. The interior of the shell is nacreous, (the nacreous texture of the inner layers is clearly visible on some of the exterior parts, where the outer layer has been removed by accidents during the youth of the animal).

This species has by its conical shape some resemblance with Carenzia trispinosa (Watson, 1879), but that species is considerably smaller, with less distinct spines, which have more the character of rounded tubercles. It has smooth interstices, without the conspicuous plications of this species. The base of the specimens of C. trispinosa is smoother and seems to offer no distinguishing character.

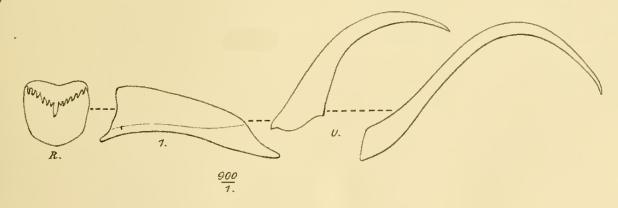
Radula of Carenzia melvilli; U= uncini; R= rhachidian tooth; l= laterals

=== Radula ===
The radula is small and rather obscure. The uncini cover the median rows, and cross even the uncini of the opposite side. The rhachidian or median tooth has a subquadrate basal part, with rounded, convex posterior and less convex lateral margins. It has a broad, triangular cusp, with one small median denticle and about 6 smaller ones on each side. The laterals one on each side have a transversely triangular shape, with an unarmed, arched upper and concave proximal and basal margin, with blunt points at the proximal and distal extremities of the basal margin. On each side are 3-4 uncini which are long, slender and strongly curved. Though this radula has some resemblance with that of Aporrhais, Verrill stated that it should be taenioglossate, as the "Siboga"-specimen has a radula with at least 9 rows of teeth and probably 11.

The nacreous character of the shell agrees with the Rhipidoglossa, and so does the larger number of uncini.

== Distribution ==
This marine species occurs off Indonesia.
