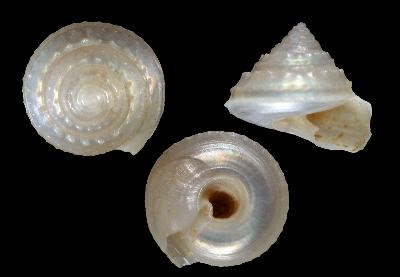
- Shell of Carenzia trispinosa (specimen at MNHN, Paris)

Scientific classification
- Kingdom: Animalia
- Phylum: Mollusca
- Class: Gastropoda
- Subclass: Vetigastropoda
- Family: Seguenziidae
- Genus: Carenzia
- Species: C. trispinosa

Binomial name
- Carenzia trispinosa (Watson, 1879)

Synonyms
- Seguenzia trispinosa Watson, 1879 (original description); Calliotropis pataxo Absalão, 2009

= Carenzia trispinosa =

Species of gastropod

Carenzia trispinosa is a species of sea snail, a marine gastropod mollusk in the family Seguenziidae.

== Description ==
(Original description by Watson) The size of the shell varies between 3 mm and 4.8 mm. The thin, smooth, umbilicate shell is small. It has a high spire with a conical shape. It is scalar with three rows of tubercled lirations.

Sculpture. There is a sharp circumbasal carina. Above this is a broad shallow furrow. About one third up the whorl is a narrow and blunt liration. A little more remote is a third, separated by a narrow, horizontal, flat surface from the suture. All these three lirations are orname ted with little tubercles or blunt spines, which are strongest on the highest thread, and there number about twenty-five on the body whorl, on the second thread there are about twenty-eight. The base, which is rather flatly arched, has round the outside a flat surface hardly deep enough to be called a furrow, defined on the inner side by a clear narrow line, within which the curve of the base rises a little and has some faint spirals. The edge of the umbilicus is sharply defined by a fine line, outside of which is a broad shallow furrow bordered externally by a slight spiral. There is another narrower furrow, the outer side of which is the most projecting part of the base, but beyond this is rather flat and has some obsolete spirals. On the upper whorls the spirals are feeble and without tubercles, which only appear distinctly on the fourth whorl.

Longitudinals: The flexuous lines of growth are very faint.

The colour of the shell is porcellanous when young and fresh, but weathering to a chalky white, with a pearly nacre below the thin surface and within the mouth, especially at the outer upper corner.

The high spire is conical and scalar. The apex is very small and sharp, flattened on the one side, and with the minute 1¼ embryonic whorl projecting tumidly on the other. The 7½ whorls show a gradual increase. The upper ones are rounded. The later whorls are flat below the suture, then angulated, then flat on the conical slope of the spire, and then very slightly constricted above the carina, very slightly rounded on the base, with a flat and slightly impressed, but sloping border round the outside, sharply angulated at the umbilicus. The suture is linear, but strongly defined by the constriction and impressed angulation of the shell at that point. The aperture is perpendicular, nearly square. The outer lip sharp and thin, not patulous, not descending. The curves are very faintly indicated by the lines of growth, but are similar to those described in Seguenzia formosa Jeffreys, 1876, there being three sinuses, one near the suture between the first and second spinose thread, a second, very small but sharp, at the carina, and a third toward the exterior of the base. The columellar lip is patulous and reverted, with a furrow behind it, twisted, with a broad deep sinus above. A strong twisted tooth projects at about two-thirds of its length, below which is a smaller sinus running out into a point at the extreme end of the columella. This point corresponds to the umbilical carina. The umbilicus is more open than large, perpendicular and deep, being only slightly narrowed by the reverted coluimellar lip and by the corresponding ridge which twines spirally round the columellar wall. Below this ridge is a very strongly marked furrow, which corresponds to the columellar tooth.

This species most resembles Carenzia carinata (Jeffreys, 1877), but is narrower, sharper, and the body whorl is larger. The suture is angulately impressed instead of being faintly linear. The spiral threads are stronger, and are picked out with tubercles. The base is more equably curved, the spirals on it are stronger. The umbilicus is smaller, and is more strongly defined, not only by the stronger carina, but by the extracarinal furrow. The columellar tooth comes in higher up than in that species.

== Distribution ==
This species occurs in the Gulf of Mexico off Texas and in the Atlantic Ocean off North Carolina to North Brazil.
