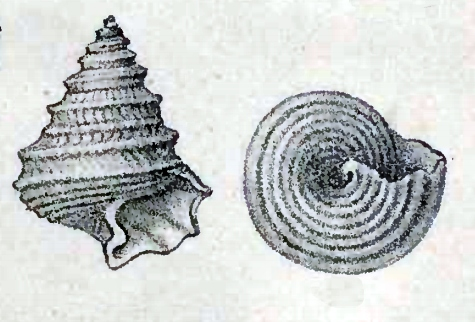
- Seguenzia monocingulata shell

Scientific classification
- Kingdom: Animalia
- Phylum: Mollusca
- Class: Gastropoda
- Subclass: Vetigastropoda
- Superfamily: Seguenzioidea
- Family: Seguenziidae
- Subfamily: Seguenziinae
- Genus: Calliobasis; B.A. Marshall, 1983

Type species
- Basilissa bombax Cotton & Godfrey, 1938

= Calliobasis =

Genus of gastropods

Calliobasis is a genus of sea snails, marine gastropod mollusks in the family Seguenziidae.

The name Calliobasis was formed from the Ancient Greek words kallion (= more beautiful) and basis (= pedestal). Its gender is feminine.

== Species ==
Species within the genus Calliobasis include:

- Calliobasis bilix (Hedley, 1905)
- Calliobasis bombax (Cotton & Godfrey, 1938)
- Calliobasis chlorosa Marshall, 1983
- † Calliobasis eos B. A. Marshall, 1983
- Calliobasis festiva Marshall, 1991
- Calliobasis gemmata Poppe, Tagaro & Stahlschmidt, 2015
- Calliobasis lapulapui Poppe, Tagaro & Dekker, 2006
- Calliobasis magellani Poppe, Tagaro & Dekker, 2006
- Calliobasis merista Marshall, 1991
- Calliobasis miranda Marshall, 1983
- Calliobasis nepticula Marshall, 1991
- Calliobasis phimosa Marshall, 1991
- Calliobasis spectrum Marshall, 1991
