= Laetifautor deceptus =

- Original drawing of a shell of Laetifautor deceptus

Scientific classification
- Kingdom: Animalia
- Phylum: Mollusca
- Class: Gastropoda
- Subclass: Vetigastropoda
- Order: Trochida
- Family: Calliostomatidae
- Subfamily: Calliostomatinae
- Genus: Laetifautor
- Species: L. deceptus

Binomial name
- Laetifautor deceptus (Edgar A. Smith, 1899)

Synonyms
- Calliostoma deceptum E.A. Smith, 1899; Calliostoma trepidum Hedley, 1907; Laetifautor trepidus (Hedley, 1907)

Species of gastropod

Laetifautor deceptus is a species of sea snail, a marine gastropod mollusk in the family Calliostomatidae. The original name, Calliostoma deceptum, was given after a number of young specimens were confused with C. rubo-punctatum, now called L. rubropunctatus.

== Description ==
The height of the shell attains 9 mm. The small, imperforate shell has a conical shape. It is reddish-white. It shows rows of acute spirals of small granules (about 6 on the penultimate whorl). The spire is moderately acute. The seven whorls are slowly increasing in size. The first one is sinistral and globose. The rest are subangulate in the middle. Above and below the suture they are flat. The base of the last whorl forms an angle. The aperture is irregularly subquadrate and sulcate within. The columella has a prominent callus.

The granules are not so acutely conical, and the base more closely granulated. Some examples exhibit scattered pale-brown dots, whilst others are uniformly of a very pale flesh tint.

== Distribution ==
This marine snail occurs off Northwest Australia.
