= Omphalotukaia =

Scientific classification
- Kingdom: Animalia
- Phylum: Mollusca
- Class: Gastropoda
- Subclass: Vetigastropoda
- Order: Trochida
- Superfamily: Trochoidea
- Family: Calliostomatidae
- Genus: Omphalotukaia; Yoshida, 1948

Genus of gastropods

Omphalotukaia is a genus of sea snails, marine gastropod mollusks, in the family Calliostomatidae within the superfamily Trochoidea, the top snails, turban snails and their allies.

== Species ==
Species within the genus Omphalotukaia include:

- Omphalotukaia hajimeana (Yoshida, 1948)
- Omphalotukaia nobilis (Hirase, 1922)

The following species were brought into synonymy: Omphalotukaia midwayensis Lan, 1990
