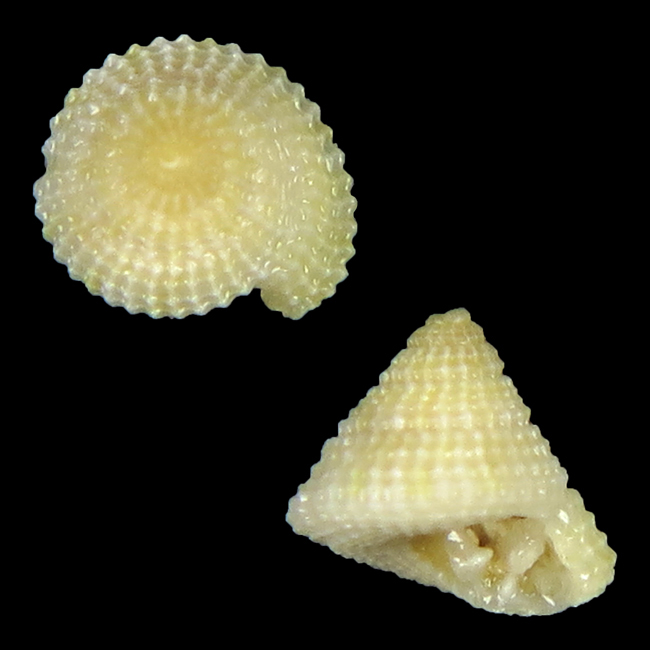

Scientific classification
- Kingdom: Animalia
- Phylum: Mollusca
- Class: Gastropoda
- Subclass: Vetigastropoda
- Family: Seguenziidae
- Genus: Calliobasis
- Species: C. lapulapui

Binomial name
- Calliobasis lapulapui Poppe, Tagaro & Dekker, 2006

= Calliobasis lapulapui =

Species of gastropod

Calliobasis lapulapui is a species of sea snail, a marine gastropod mollusk in the family Seguenziidae.

== Description ==
The size of the shell varies between 2 mm and 7 mm.

== Distribution ==
This marine species occurs off the Philippines and has apparently been found near the Ogasawara Islands near Japan.
