= Calliobasis chlorosa =

Scientific classification
- Kingdom: Animalia
- Phylum: Mollusca
- Class: Gastropoda
- Subclass: Vetigastropoda
- Superfamily: Seguenzioidea
- Family: Seguenziidae
- Subfamily: Seguenziinae
- Genus: Calliobasis
- Species: C. chlorosa

Binomial name
- Calliobasis chlorosa Marshall, 1983

Species of gastropod

Calliobasis chlorosa is a species of small deep water sea snail in the family Seguenziidae.

== Distribution ==
This marine species occurs off Norfolk Island.

== Description ==
The height of the shell is about 4.5 mm (0.18 in).
