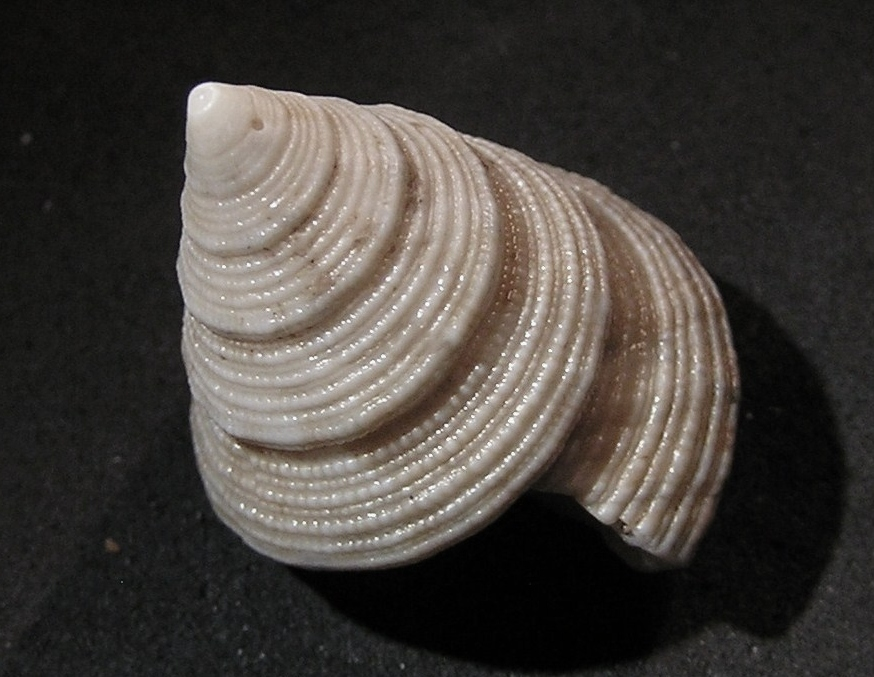
- Top view of the shell of Astele similaris

Scientific classification
- Kingdom: Animalia
- Phylum: Mollusca
- Class: Gastropoda
- Subclass: Vetigastropoda
- Order: Trochida
- Family: Calliostomatidae
- Subfamily: Calliostomatinae
- Genus: Astele
- Species: A. similaris

Binomial name
- Astele similaris (Reeve, 1863)

Synonyms
- Calliostoma excellens Thiele, 1930; Calliostoma similaris Reeve, 1863; Calliostoma (Astele) similarae (Reeve, 1863); Zizyphinus similaris Reeve, 1863

= Astele similaris =

Species of gastropod

Astele similaris is a species of marine sea snail, a marine gastropod mollusk in the family Calliostomatidae.

== Description ==
The height of the shell varies between 22 mm and 35 mm.

== Distribution ==
This species occurs in the Central Indo-West Pacific.

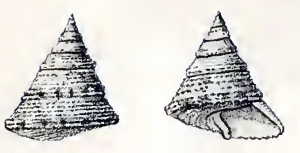
Drawing with two views of a shell of Astele similaris

== Notes ==
Additional information regarding this species:

- Taxonomic remark: Some authors place this taxon in the subgenus Astele (Astele)
