= Quinnia cazioti =

Scientific classification
- Kingdom: Animalia
- Phylum: Mollusca
- Class: Gastropoda
- Subclass: Vetigastropoda
- Superfamily: Seguenzioidea
- Family: Seguenziidae
- Subfamily: Seguenziinae
- Genus: Quinnia
- Species: Q. cazioti

Binomial name
- Quinnia cazioti (Dautzenberg, 1925)

Synonyms
- Seguenzia cazioti Dautzenberg, 1925

Species of gastropod

Quinnia cazioti is a species of extremely small deep water sea snail, a marine gastropod mollusk in the family Seguenziidae.
