= Astele punctocostata =

Scientific classification
- Kingdom: Animalia
- Phylum: Mollusca
- Class: Gastropoda
- Subclass: Vetigastropoda
- Order: Trochida
- Family: Calliostomatidae
- Subfamily: Calliostomatinae
- Genus: Astele
- Species: A. punctocostata

Binomial name
- Astele punctocostata (A. Adams, 1853)

Synonyms
- Gibbula punctocostata A. Adams, 1853 (original combination)

Species of gastropod

Astele punctocostata is a species of sea snail, a marine gastropod mollusk in the family Calliostomatidae.

== Distribution ==
The type specimen was found off the island of Capul, Northern Samar, the Philippines.
