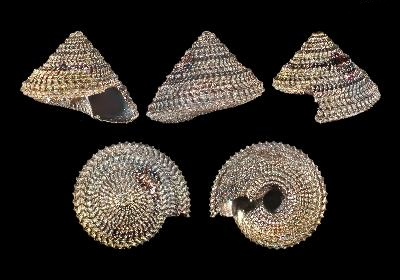
- Shell of Calliobasis nepticula (holotype in MNHN, Paris)

Scientific classification
- Kingdom: Animalia
- Phylum: Mollusca
- Class: Gastropoda
- Subclass: Vetigastropoda
- Superfamily: Seguenzioidea
- Family: Seguenziidae
- Subfamily: Seguenziinae
- Genus: Calliobasis
- Species: C. nepticula

Binomial name
- Calliobasis nepticula Marshall, 1991

= Calliobasis nepticula =

Species of gastropod

Calliobasis nepticula is a species of small deep water sea snail in the family Seguenziidae.

== Distribution ==
This marine species occurs off New Caledonia.

== Description ==
The height of the shell is about 3.1 mm (0.12 in).
