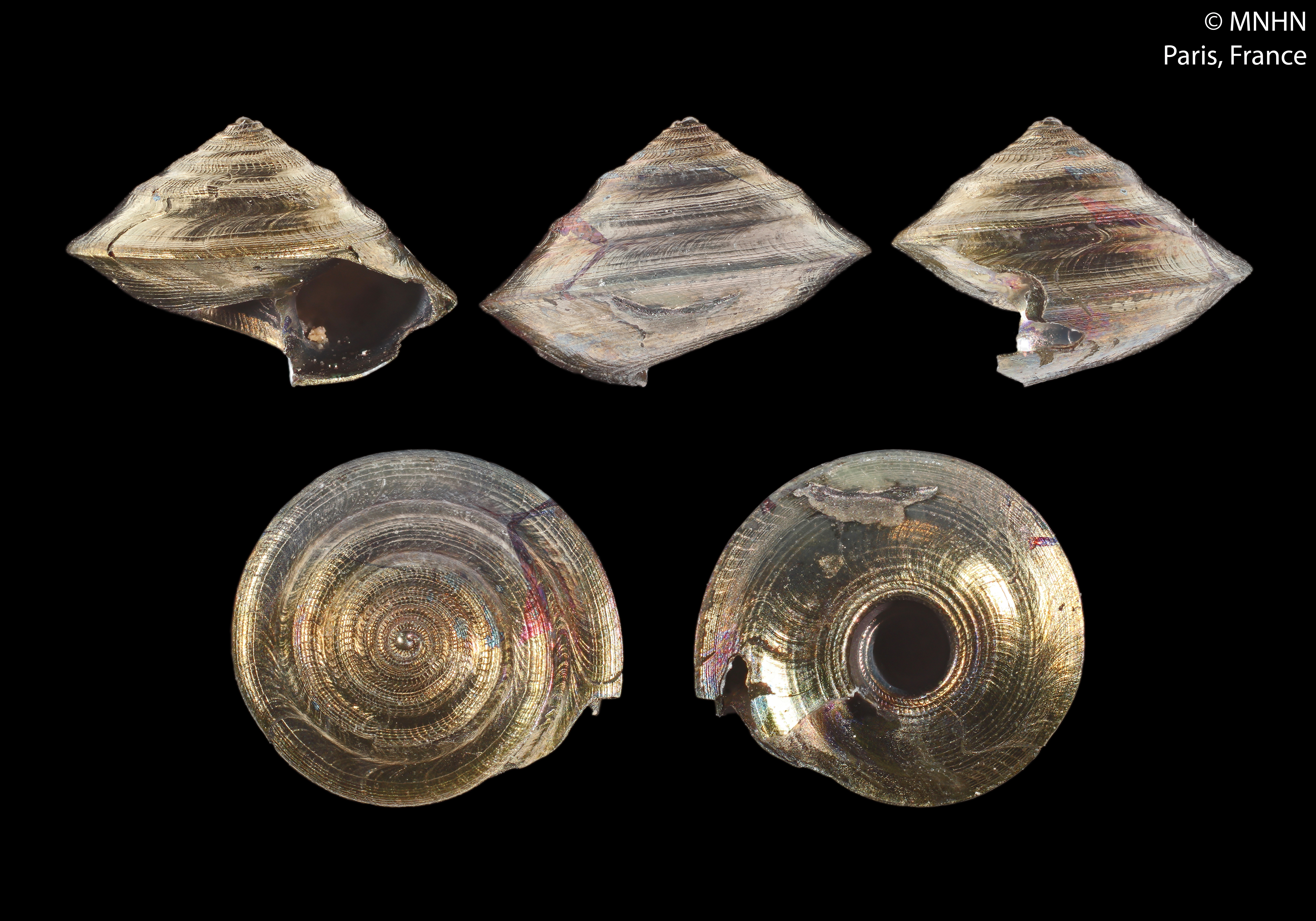
- Shell of Quinnia limatula (holotype at MNHN, Paris)

Scientific classification
- Kingdom: Animalia
- Phylum: Mollusca
- Class: Gastropoda
- Subclass: Vetigastropoda
- Family: Seguenziidae
- Subfamily: Seguenziinae
- Genus: Quinnia
- Species: Q. limatula

Binomial name
- Quinnia limatula Marshall, 1991

= Quinnia limatula =

Species of gastropod

Quinnia limatula is a species of extremely small deep water sea snail, a marine gastropod mollusk in the family Seguenziidae.

== Description ==
Quinnia limatula has a small (up to 5 mm in length), limpet-like shell with a low, translucent white profile. The smooth surface features fine radial threads and concentric growth lines, creating a subtle cancellate texture. The apex is central and prosocyrt (curved forward), while the protoconch is smooth and paucispiral. The aperture is elliptical, and the muscle scar forms a distinct horseshoe shape.

== Distribution ==
This marine species occurs off New Caledonia and Ouvea, Loyalty Islands.

== Etymology ==
The genus Quinnia honors malacologist John Quinn, while the species name limatula (Latin: "small file") references its finely sculptured shell.
