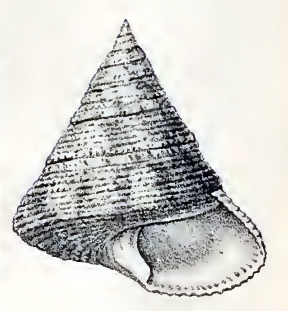
- Drawing of a shell of Astele speciosa

Scientific classification
- Kingdom: Animalia
- Phylum: Mollusca
- Class: Gastropoda
- Subclass: Vetigastropoda
- Order: Trochida
- Family: Calliostomatidae
- Subfamily: Calliostomatinae
- Genus: Astele
- Species: A. speciosa

Binomial name
- Astele speciosa (A. Adams in H. Adams & A. Adams, 1854)

Synonyms
- Calliostoma (Astele) speciosum (Adams, A. in Adams, H.G. & A. Adams, 1854); Pulchrastele speciosa Iredale, T. & McMichael, D.F. 1962; Trochus (Calliostoma) speciosus E. A. Smith, Zizyphus speciosa A. Adams, 1854

= Astele speciosa =

Species of gastropod

Astele speciosa, common name the beautiful top shell, is a species of sea snail, a marine gastropod mollusk in the family Calliostomatidae.

== Notes ==
Additional information regarding this species:

- Taxonomic remark: Some authors place this taxon in the subgenus Astele (Astele)

== Description ==
The size of the shell varies between 20 mm and 43 mm. The pyramidal-conical shell is imperforate, flesh-colored, variegated and punctate with rufous. The whorls are plano-concave, sculptured with transverse subgranulate alternately smaller and larger lirae. The granules are reddish brown. The body whorl is obtusely angular. The base of the shell is concentrically grooved. The umbilical region is impressed and bounded by a rufous callus. The aperture is subquadrate. The solid columella is subarcuate and scarcely truncate anteriorly. The outer lip is lirate within. Its margin is subangulate in the middle.

== Distribution ==
This marine species occurs from Central Queensland to northern New South Wales, Australia
