= Quinnia rushi =

Scientific classification
- Kingdom: Animalia
- Phylum: Mollusca
- Class: Gastropoda
- Subclass: Vetigastropoda
- Superfamily: Seguenzioidea
- Family: Seguenziidae
- Subfamily: Seguenziinae
- Genus: Quinnia
- Species: Q. rushi

Binomial name
- Quinnia rushi (Dall, 1927)

Synonyms
- Seguenzia rushi Dall, 1927 (original description)

Species of gastropod

Quinnia rushi is a species of extremely small deep water sea snail, a marine gastropod mollusk in the family Seguenziidae.

== Description ==
(Original description by W.H. Dall) The height of the shell attains 2.6 mm. The small, depressed shell has a trochoid shape. It has about five whorls. The early whorls have one, the later ones two, the last whorl three spiral keels on the anterior one of which the suture is laid. The base of the shell is moderately convex, with a deep funicular umbilicus. It is closely finely spirally threaded, the threads a little coarser near the umbilical margin. In the interspaces between the keels on the spire are very minute close spiral striae. The aperture shows a very shallow sulcus. The outer lip is thin, modified by the sculpture. The columella is short and twisted. Its termination forms a prominent rounded projection hardly to be called a tooth.

== Distribution ==
This species occurs in the Atlantic Ocean off Georgia, USA.
