= Coralastele =

Scientific classification
- Kingdom: Animalia
- Phylum: Mollusca
- Class: Gastropoda
- Subclass: Vetigastropoda
- Order: Trochida
- Superfamily: Trochoidea
- Family: Calliostomatidae
- Genus: Coralastele; Iredale, 1930

Genus of gastropods

Coralastele is a genus of sea snails, marine gastropod mollusks, in the family Calliostomatidae within the superfamily Trochoidea, the top snails, turban snails and their allies.

== Species ==
Species within the genus Coralastele include:

- Coralastele allanae Iredale, 1930
- Coralastele pulcherrima (G. B. Sowerby III, 1914)

The following species were brought into synonymy:

- Coralastele emigrans Nordsieck, 1972
