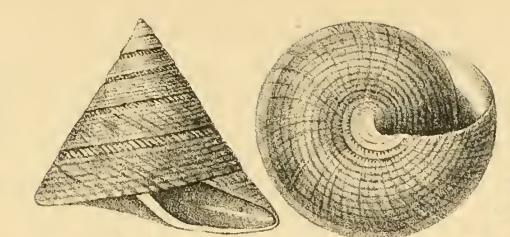
- Drawing with two views of a shell of Astele ciliaris

Scientific classification
- Kingdom: Animalia
- Phylum: Mollusca
- Class: Gastropoda
- Subclass: Vetigastropoda
- Order: Trochida
- Family: Calliostomatidae
- Subfamily: Calliostomatinae
- Genus: Astele
- Species: A. ciliaris

Binomial name
- Astele ciliaris (Menke, 1843)

Synonyms
- Astele ciliare sic (incorrect gender ending); Calliostoma calliope Cotton & Godfrey, 1938; Trochus ciliaris Menke, 1843

= Astele ciliaris =

Species of gastropod

Astele ciliaris, common name the keeled Australian top shell, is a species of sea snail, a marine gastropod mollusk in the family Calliostomatidae.

== Notes ==
Additional information regarding this species:

- Taxonomic remark: Some authors place this taxon in the subgenus Astele (Astele)

== Description ==
The size of the shell varies between 25 mm and 40 mm. The imperforate shell has a pyramidal shape. It is fulvous, with red spots along the suture. It is transversely striate, decussated by very delicate striae. The base of the shell is plane. The flat whorls are margined below and ciliate-fimbriate above. The aperture ovate-lanceolate. The outer lip is callous-margined inside.

== Distribution ==
This marine species occurs off Western Australia.
