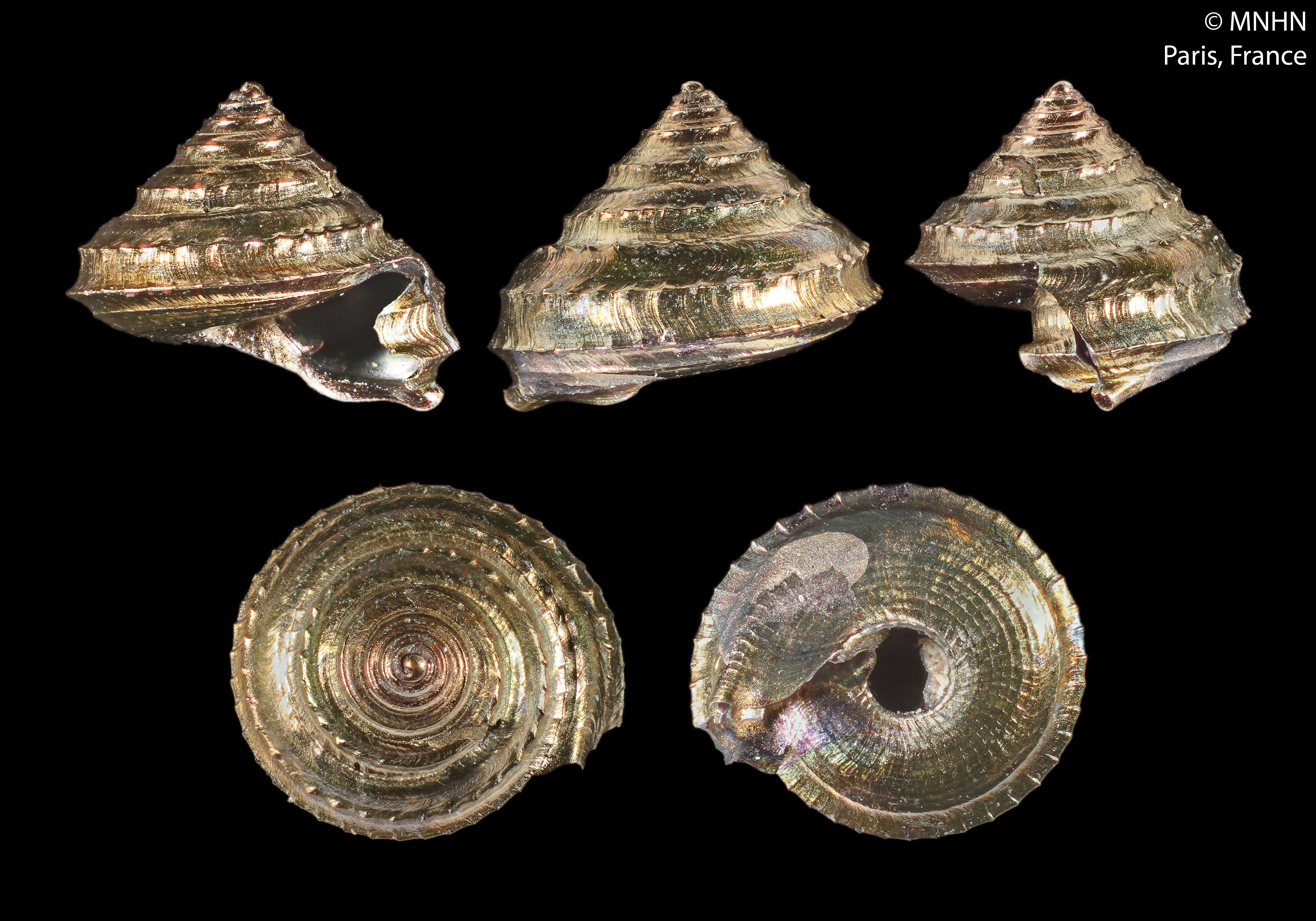
- Shell of Carenzia serrata (holotype at MNHN, Paris)

Scientific classification
- Kingdom: Animalia
- Phylum: Mollusca
- Class: Gastropoda
- Subclass: Vetigastropoda
- Superfamily: Seguenzioidea
- Family: Seguenziidae
- Subfamily: Seguenziinae
- Genus: Carenzia
- Species: C. serrata

Binomial name
- Carenzia serrata Marshall, 1991

= Carenzia serrata =

Species of gastropod

Carenzia serrata is a species of small deep water sea snail in the family Seguenziidae.

== Distribution ==
This marine species occurs off New Caledonia. The holotype was obtained from depths between 1,490 and 1,740 m (4,890 and 5,710 ft).

== Description ==
The shell can reach 3.5 mm (0.14 in) in width and is wider than it is high.
