= Astele bularra =

Scientific classification
- Kingdom: Animalia
- Phylum: Mollusca
- Class: Gastropoda
- Subclass: Vetigastropoda
- Order: Trochida
- Family: Calliostomatidae
- Genus: Astele
- Species: A. bularra

Binomial name
- Astele bularra Garrard, 1961

Synonyms
- Calliostoma bularra (Garrard, 1961); Calliostoma (Astele) bularra (Garrard, T.A., 1961)

Species of gastropod

Astele bularra, common name the necklace top shell, is a species of sea snail, a marine gastropod mollusk in the family Calliostomatidae.

Some authors place this taxon in the subgenus Astele (Astele)

== Description ==
The size of the shell varies between 20 mm and 29 mm.

== Distribution ==
This marine species occurs off Indo-Malaysia, the eastern coast of Australia and South Africa.
