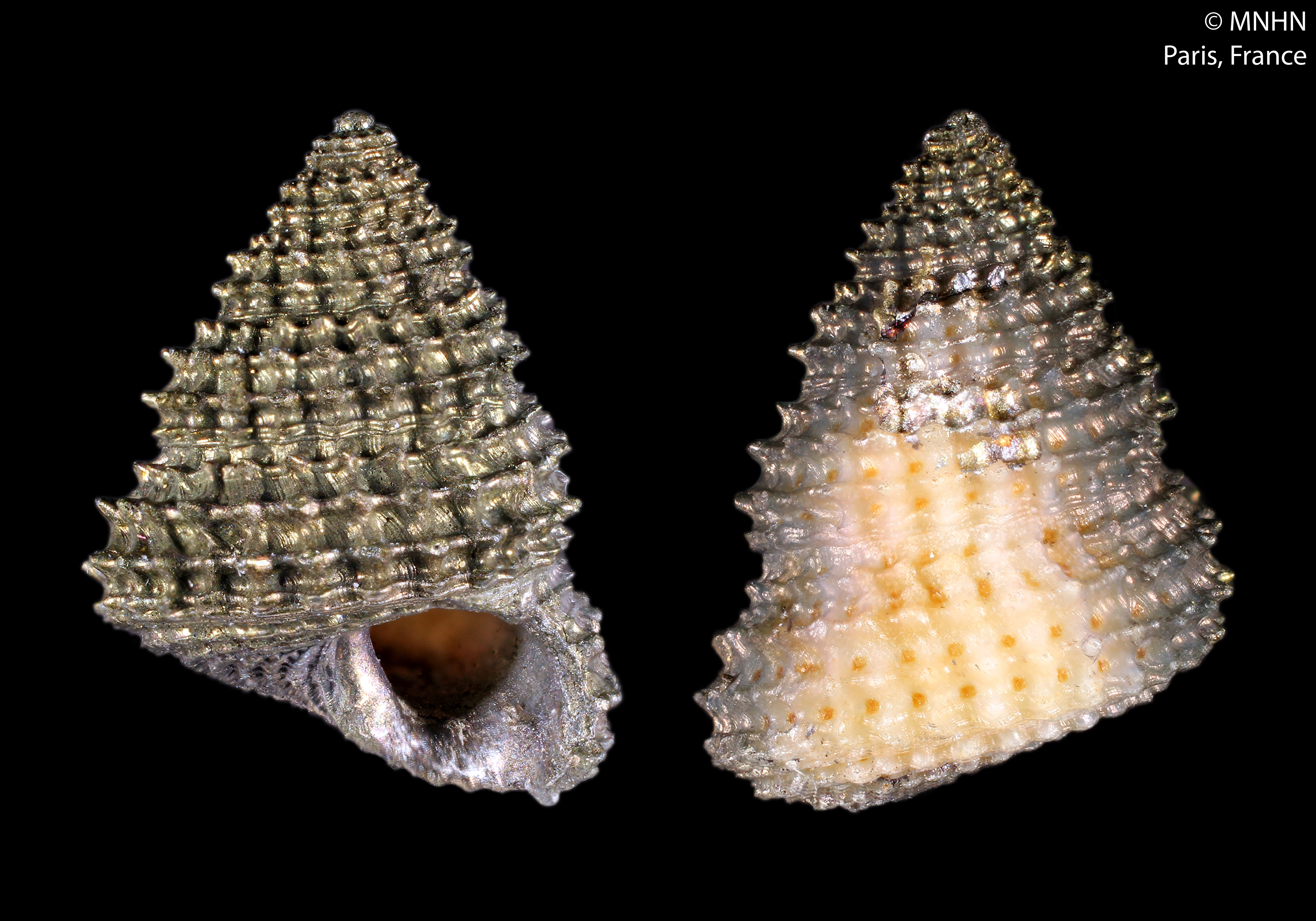
- Shell of Laetifautor fundatus (holotype at MNHN, Paris)

Scientific classification
- Kingdom: Animalia
- Phylum: Mollusca
- Class: Gastropoda
- Subclass: Vetigastropoda
- Order: Trochida
- Family: Calliostomatidae
- Genus: Laetifautor
- Species: L. fundatus

Binomial name
- Laetifautor fundatus Marshall, 1995

Synonyms
- Calliostoma (Laetifautor) fundatus Marshall, 1995

= Laetifautor fundatus =

Species of gastropod

Laetifautor fundatus is a species of sea snail, a marine gastropod mollusc in the family Calliostomatidae.

== Description ==
The length of the shell attains 6 mm.

== Distribution ==
This marine species occurs off New Caledonia at a depth of about 60 m.
