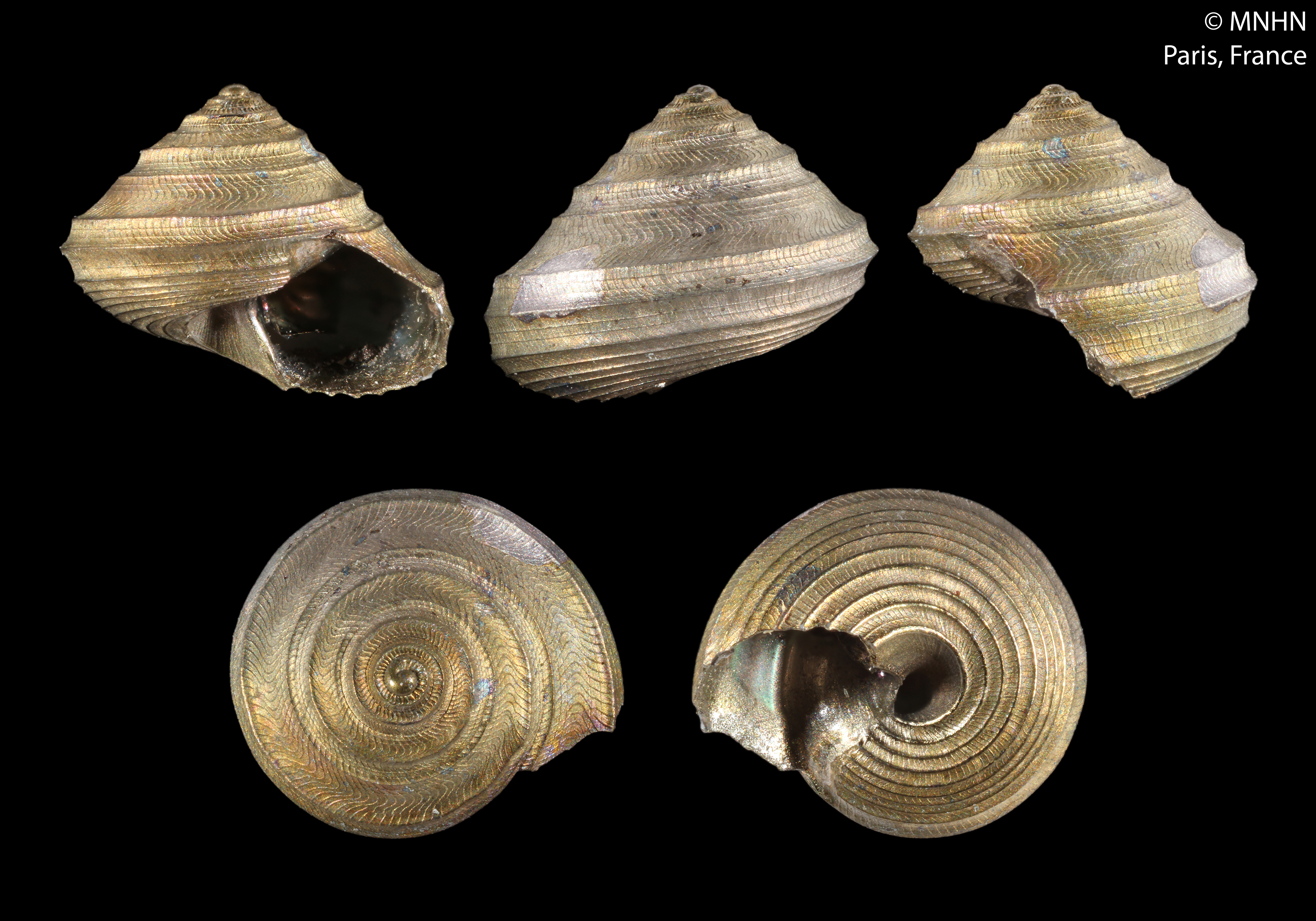
- Shell of Quinnia laetifica (holotype at MNHN, Paris)

Scientific classification
- Kingdom: Animalia
- Phylum: Mollusca
- Class: Gastropoda
- Subclass: Vetigastropoda
- Superfamily: Seguenzioidea
- Family: Seguenziidae
- Subfamily: Seguenziinae
- Genus: Quinnia
- Species: Q. laetifica

Binomial name
- Quinnia laetifica Marshall, 1991

= Quinnia laetifica =

Species of gastropod

Quinnia laetifica is a species of extremely small deep water sea snail, a marine gastropod mollusk in the family Seguenziidae.

== Description ==
The length of the shell attains 3.9 mm.

== Distribution ==
This marine species occurs on the Norfolk Ridge, off New Caledonia.
