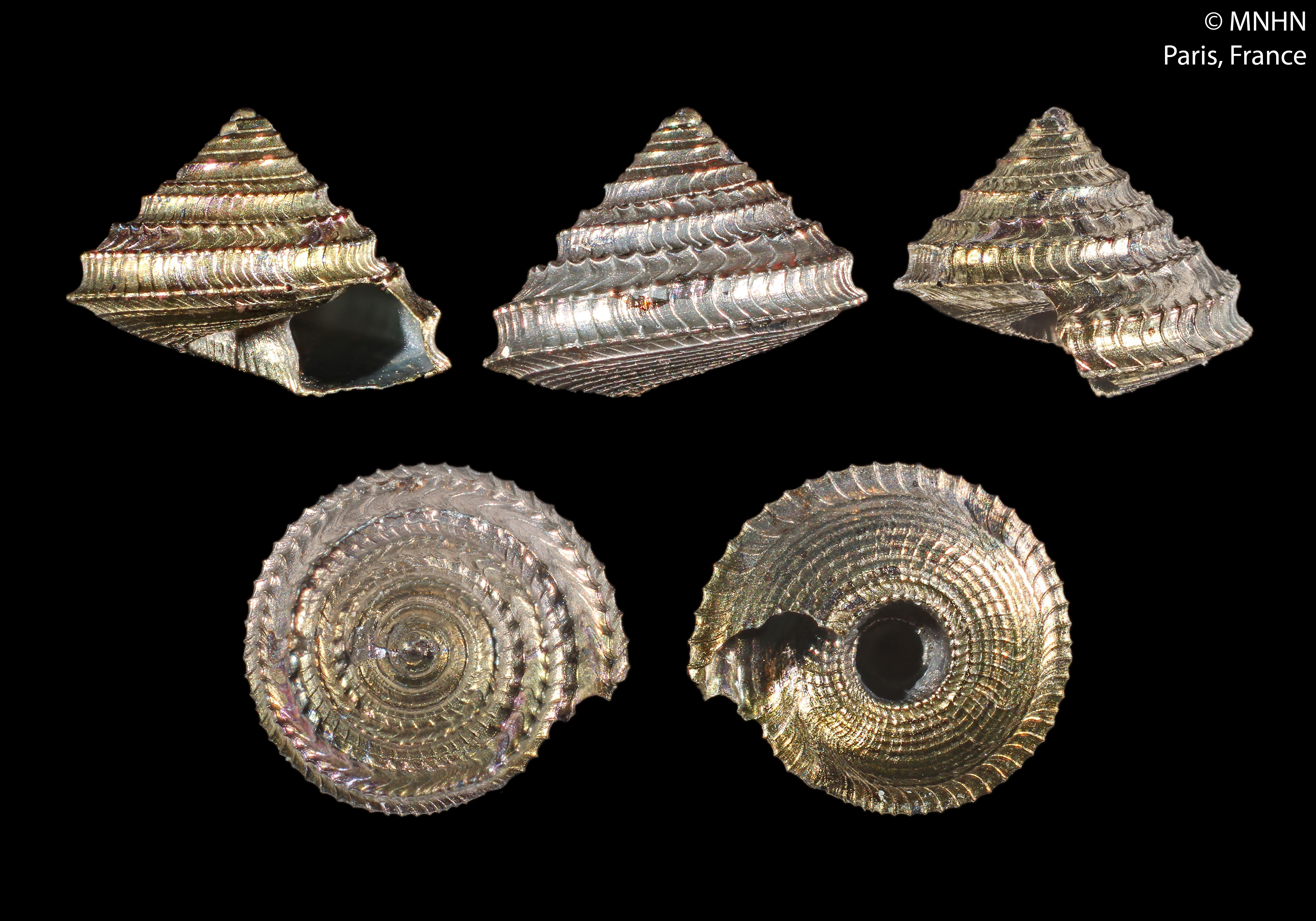
- Shell of Carenzia ornata (holotype at MNHN, Paris)

Scientific classification
- Kingdom: Animalia
- Phylum: Mollusca
- Class: Gastropoda
- Subclass: Vetigastropoda
- Superfamily: Seguenzioidea
- Family: Seguenziidae
- Subfamily: Seguenziinae
- Genus: Carenzia
- Species: C. ornata

Binomial name
- Carenzia ornata Marshall, 1991

= Carenzia ornata =

Species of gastropod

Carenzia ornata is a species of small deep water sea snail in the family Seguenziidae.

== Distribution ==
This marine species occurs off New Caledonia. The holotype was obtained from depths between 2,100 and 2,650 m (6,890 and 8,690 ft).

== Description ==
The shell measures 3.6 mm (0.14 in) in width and is markedly wider than it is high; the specimen might be immature.
