= Calliobasis miranda =

Scientific classification
- Kingdom: Animalia
- Phylum: Mollusca
- Class: Gastropoda
- Subclass: Vetigastropoda
- Superfamily: Seguenzioidea
- Family: Seguenziidae
- Subfamily: Seguenziinae
- Genus: Calliobasis
- Species: C. miranda

Binomial name
- Calliobasis miranda Marshall, 1983

Species of gastropod

Calliobasis miranda is a species of extremely small deep water sea snail, a marine gastropod mollusk in the family Seguenziidae.

== Description ==
The height of the shell attains 2 mm.

== Distribution ==
This marine species occurs off New Zealand.
