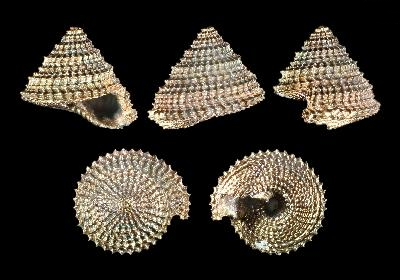
- Shell of Calliobasis festiva (specimen at MNHN, Paris)

Scientific classification
- Kingdom: Animalia
- Phylum: Mollusca
- Class: Gastropoda
- Subclass: Vetigastropoda
- Superfamily: Seguenzioidea
- Family: Seguenziidae
- Subfamily: Seguenziinae
- Genus: Calliobasis
- Species: C. festiva

Binomial name
- Calliobasis festiva Marshall, 1991

= Calliobasis festiva =

Species of gastropod

Calliobasis festiva is a species of small deep water sea snail in the family Seguenziidae.

== Distribution ==
This marine species occurs off New Caledonia.

== Description ==
The height of the shell is about 2.8 mm (0.11 in).
