= Carenzia inermis =

Scientific classification
- Kingdom: Animalia
- Phylum: Mollusca
- Class: Gastropoda
- Subclass: Vetigastropoda
- Superfamily: Seguenzioidea
- Family: Seguenziidae
- Subfamily: Seguenziinae
- Genus: Carenzia
- Species: C. inermis

Binomial name
- Carenzia inermis (Quinn, 1983)

Species of gastropod

Carenzia inermis is a species of extremely small deep water sea snail, a marine gastropod mollusk in the family Seguenziidae.

== Description ==
The height of the shell attains 6.8 mm.

== Distribution ==
This species occurs in the Pacific Ocean off Oregon, USA.
