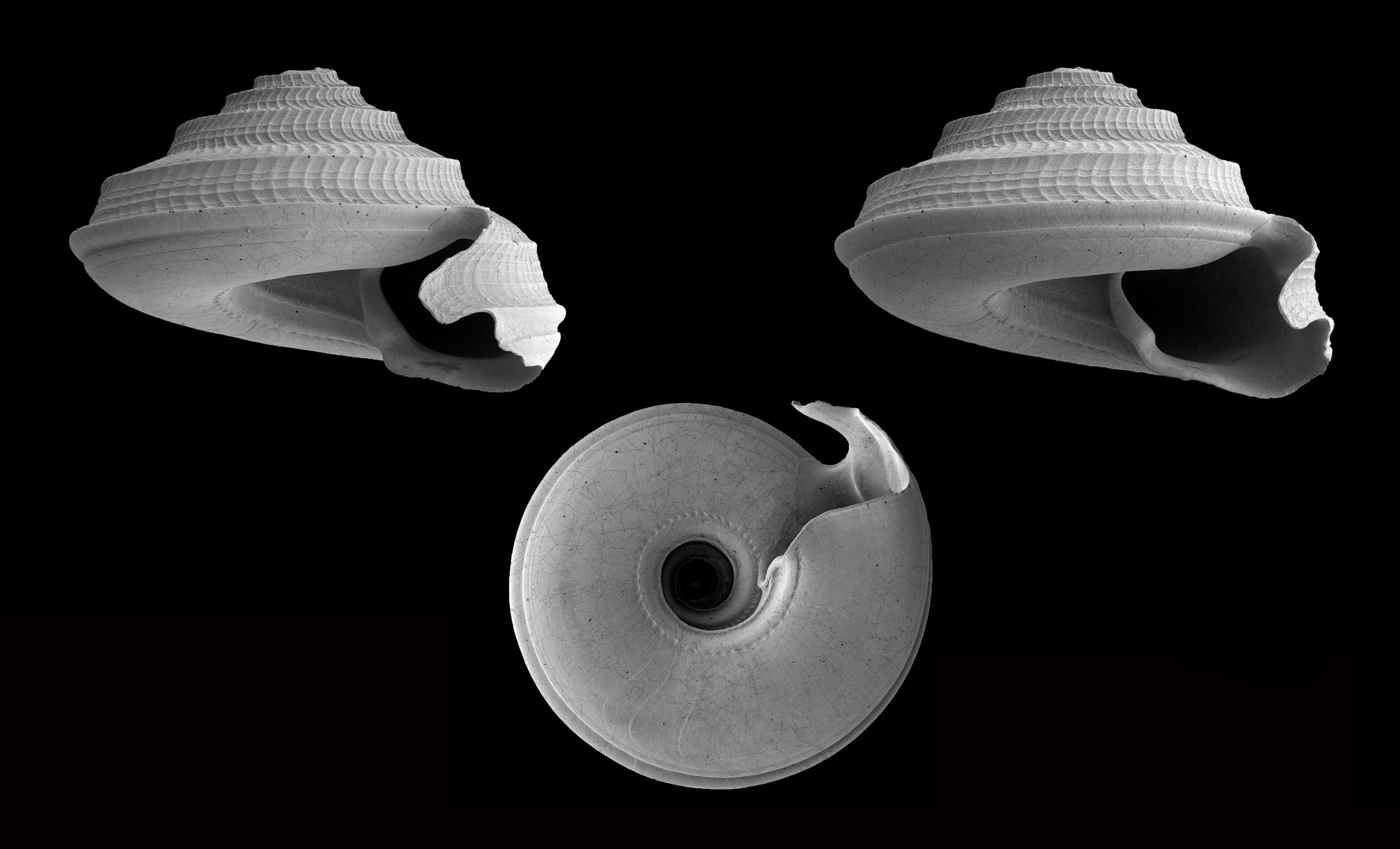
- Shell of Carenzia marismontis (holotype at MNHN, Paris)

Scientific classification
- Kingdom: Animalia
- Phylum: Mollusca
- Class: Gastropoda
- Subclass: Vetigastropoda
- Superfamily: Seguenzioidea
- Family: Seguenziidae
- Subfamily: Seguenziinae
- Genus: Carenzia; Quinn, 1983

Type species
- Seguenzia carinata Jeffreys, 1877

= Carenzia =

Genus of gastropods

Carenzia is a genus of sea snails, marine gastropod mollusks in the family Seguenziidae.

== Species ==
According to the World Register of Marine Species (WoRMS), the following species with valid names are included within the genus Carenzia:

- Carenzia acanthodes Marshall, 1991
- Carenzia carinata (Jeffreys, 1877)
- Carenzia fastigiata B. A. Marshall, 1983
- Carenzia golikovi Geiger, 2017
- Carenzia inermis Quinn, 1983
- Carenzia marismontis Hoffman, Gofas & Freiwald, 2020
- Carenzia melvillii (Schepman, 1909)
- Carenzia nitens Marshall, 1991
- Carenzia ornata Marshall, 1991
- Carenzia serrata Marshall, 1991
- Carenzia trispinosa (Watson, 1879)
- Carenzia venusta Marshall, 1983
