= Carenzia fastigiata =

Scientific classification
- Kingdom: Animalia
- Phylum: Mollusca
- Class: Gastropoda
- Subclass: Vetigastropoda
- Superfamily: Seguenzioidea
- Family: Seguenziidae
- Subfamily: Seguenziinae
- Genus: Carenzia
- Species: C. fastigiata

Binomial name
- Carenzia fastigiata Marshall, 1983

Species of gastropod

Carenzia fastigiata is a species of extremely small deep water sea snail, a marine gastropod mollusk in the family Seguenziidae.

== Description ==
The height of the shell attains 3.3 mm. it is broader than high with a width of 4.1 mm.

== Distribution ==
This marine species occurs off New Zealand and in the Tasman Basin at a depth of about 1,700 m.
