= Laetifautor elegans =

Scientific classification
- Kingdom: Animalia
- Phylum: Mollusca
- Class: Gastropoda
- Subclass: Vetigastropoda
- Order: Trochida
- Family: Calliostomatidae
- Genus: Laetifautor
- Species: L. elegans

Binomial name
- Laetifautor elegans Habe, 1960

Synonyms
- Calliostoma (Laetifautor) elegans (Habe, 1960); Laetifautor amakusaensis Habe in Azuma & Toki, 1968

Species of gastropod

Laetifautor elegans is a species of sea snail, a marine gastropod mollusc in the family Calliostomatidae.

== Description ==
The length of the shell varies between 3 mm and 8 mm.

== Distribution ==
This marine species occurs off Japan.
