= Quinnia polita =

Scientific classification
- Kingdom: Animalia
- Phylum: Mollusca
- Class: Gastropoda
- Subclass: Vetigastropoda
- Superfamily: Seguenzioidea
- Family: Seguenziidae
- Subfamily: Seguenziinae
- Genus: Quinnia
- Species: Q. polita

Binomial name
- Quinnia polita (Verco, 1906)

Synonyms
- Seguenzia polita Verco, 1906

Species of gastropod

Quinnia polita is a species of extremely small deep water sea snail, a marine gastropod mollusk in the family Seguenziidae.
