= Calliobasis bombax =

Scientific classification
- Kingdom: Animalia
- Phylum: Mollusca
- Class: Gastropoda
- Subclass: Vetigastropoda
- Superfamily: Seguenzioidea
- Family: Seguenziidae
- Subfamily: Seguenziinae
- Genus: Calliobasis
- Species: C. bombax

Binomial name
- Calliobasis bombax (Cotton & Godfrey, 1938)

Synonyms
- Basilissa bombax Cotton & Godfrey, 1938

Species of gastropod

Calliobasis bombax is a species of small deep-water sea snail in the family Seguenziidae. It is endemic to Australia with records from the Bass Strait and the Great Australian Bight.
