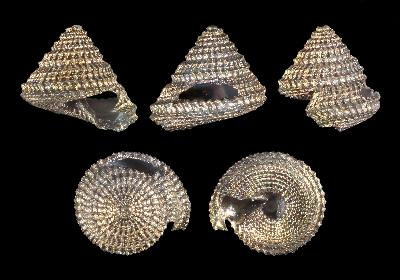
- Shell of Calliobasis spectrum (holotype in MNHN, Paris)

Scientific classification
- Kingdom: Animalia
- Phylum: Mollusca
- Class: Gastropoda
- Subclass: Vetigastropoda
- Superfamily: Seguenzioidea
- Family: Seguenziidae
- Subfamily: Seguenziinae
- Genus: Calliobasis
- Species: C. spectrum

Binomial name
- Calliobasis spectrum Marshall, 1991

= Calliobasis spectrum =

Species of gastropod

Calliobasis spectrum is a species of small deep water sea snail in the family Seguenziidae.

== Description ==
The height of the shell is 2.2–3 mm (0.087–0.118 in).

== Distribution ==
This marine species occurs off the Philippines and New Caledonia.
