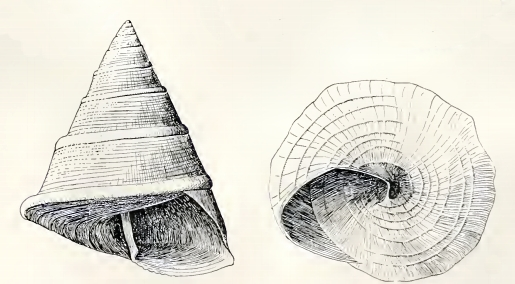
- Callistele calliston is the only species in this genus

Scientific classification
- Kingdom: Animalia
- Phylum: Mollusca
- Class: Gastropoda
- Subclass: Vetigastropoda
- Order: Trochida
- Superfamily: Trochoidea
- Family: Trochidae
- Genus: Callistele; Cotton & Godfrey, 1935

= Callistele =

Genus of gastropods

Callistele is a genus of sea snails, marine gastropod mollusks in the family Trochidae, the top snails (unassigned to a subfamily).

== Species ==
- Callistele calliston (Verco, 1905)
