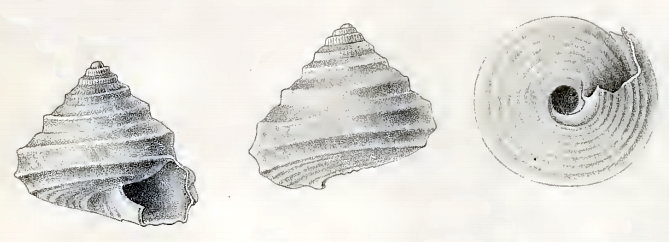
- Drawing with three views of a shell of Quinnia sykesi

Scientific classification
- Kingdom: Animalia
- Phylum: Mollusca
- Class: Gastropoda
- Subclass: Vetigastropoda
- Superfamily: Seguenzioidea
- Family: Seguenziidae
- Subfamily: Seguenziinae
- Genus: Quinnia; Marshall, 1988

Type species
- Seguenziella patula B. A. Marshall, 1983

Synonyms
- Seguenziella Marshall, 1983

= Quinnia =

Genus of gastropods

Quinnia is a genus of minute sea snails, marine gastropod mollusks or micromollusks in the subfamily Seguenziinae of the family Seguenziidae.

Quinnia is a replacement name for Seguenziella Marshall, 1983, a junior homonym of Seguenziella Neviani, 1901.

== Description ==
The shape of the shell is conical. It has a peripheral carina and sharp, collabral axial riblets. There is no microsculpture. All whorls possess midwhorl angulation. Spiral lirae are present on some whorls. The shallow posterior sinus has a V-shape. The anterolateral sinus forms a channel. The basal sinus is present. There is no columellar sinus. The aperture has a rhomboidal shape. The columellar tooth is present. There is no umbilical septum.

Radula: the rachidian tooth is higher than broad and has lateral wings reduced or absent. The lateral tooth cusp is narrow. There are less than 10 marginal tooth pairs.

== Species ==
Species within the genus Quinnia include:

- Quinnia cazioti (Dautzenberg, 1925)
- Quinnia ionica (Watson, 1878)
- Quinnia laetifica Marshall, 1991
- Quinnia limatula Marshall, 1991
- Quinnia patula (Marshall, 1983)
- Quinnia polita (Verco, 1906)
- Quinnia rushi (Dall, 1927)
- Quinnia sykesi (Schepman, 1909)
