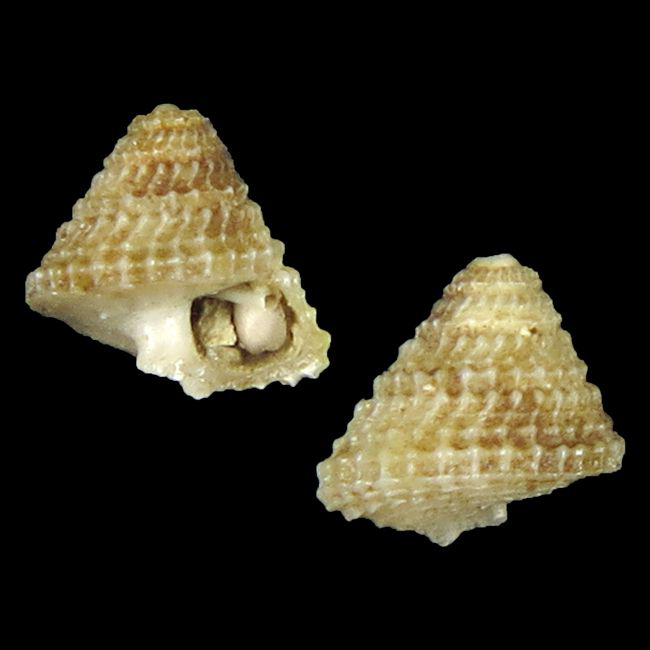

Scientific classification
- Kingdom: Animalia
- Phylum: Mollusca
- Class: Gastropoda
- Subclass: Vetigastropoda
- Family: Seguenziidae
- Genus: Calliobasis
- Species: C. magellani

Binomial name
- Calliobasis magellani Poppe, Tagaro & Dekker, 2006

= Calliobasis magellani =

Species of gastropod

Calliobasis magellani is a species of sea snail, a marine gastropod mollusk in the family Seguenziidae.

== Description ==
The length of the shell varies between 1.3 mm and 3.5 mm.

== Distribution ==
This marine species occurs off the Philippines.
