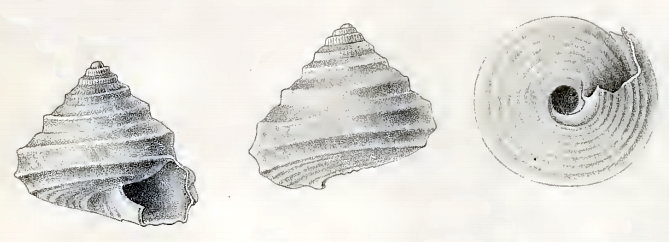
- Original drawing with three views of a shell of Quinnia sykesi

Scientific classification
- Kingdom: Animalia
- Phylum: Mollusca
- Class: Gastropoda
- Subclass: Vetigastropoda
- Superfamily: Seguenzioidea
- Family: Seguenziidae
- Subfamily: Seguenziinae
- Genus: Quinnia
- Species: Q. sykesi

Binomial name
- Quinnia sykesi (Schepman, 1909)

Synonyms
- Seguenzia sykesi Schepman, 1909

= Quinnia sykesi =

Species of gastropod

Quinnia sykesi is a species of extremely small deep water sea snail, a marine gastropod mollusk in the family Seguenziidae.

This species was named in honour of Mr. Ernest Ruthven Sykes, who has sent to M. Schepman for comparison a beautiful lot of specimens of this genus.

== Description ==
(Original description by M. Schepman) The height of the umbilicate shell attains 3 mm. The shell is small and subglobose. The spire forms a short, subgradate cone. The shell is whitish-yellow, with a slight nacreous lustre. The spire contains about 6 whorls, of which about one forms the blunt, smooth nucleus. The next whorls, including the penultimate, have only one strong median keel. The space above and below this keel is slightly concave, with a few microscopic spiral threadlike striae. Two whorls next to the nucleus are crossed by conspicuous radiating riblets, straight but in an oblique direction above the keel, convex below it. These riblets then suddenly disappear, only very fine striae succeeding them, being scarcely perceptible on the body whorl, which is bicarinate. A third keel borders the flattened base;. The suture is rather conspicuous but shallow, with very slight traces of being margined, probably by the covered keel. The base of the shell shows 7 spirals of which the distal one, separated from the third keel by a slightly concave space, and one bordering the umbilicus are stronger. Moreover the whole base is covered with microscopic radiating striae, beautifully waved in an S-like manner. The umbilicus is moderately wide, pervious, and funnel-shaped. Its wall is wave-striated, with a shallow spiral groove terminated by a tooth on the columella. The aperture is irregularly subquadrate. Its outer margin is so much broken, that no sinus remains. It is strongly sinuous by the terminations of the keels, of which the upper one becomes double at a little distance from the mouth. The columellar margin is connected to the outer one, by a thin layer of enamel on the body whorl. It is first strongly excavated above by a rather deep sinus, reaching the columellar tooth. Below this tooth it is again concave and terminates in an angle when it joins the basal margin at the point terminating the umbilical keel.

== Distribution ==
This species occurs in the Banda Sea, Indonesia.
