= Astele multigrana =

Scientific classification
- Kingdom: Animalia
- Phylum: Mollusca
- Class: Gastropoda
- Subclass: Vetigastropoda
- Order: Trochida
- Family: Calliostomatidae
- Subfamily: Calliostomatinae
- Genus: Astele
- Species: A. multigrana

Binomial name
- Astele multigrana (Dunker, 1871)

Synonyms
- Astele multigranum sic (misspelling); Calliostoma (Astelena) multigranum (Dunker, 1871); Ziziphinus multigranus Dunker, 1871

Species of gastropod

Astele multigrana is a species of sea snail, a marine gastropod mollusk in the family Calliostomatidae.

== Notes ==
Additional information regarding this species:

- Taxonomic remark: Some authors place this taxon in the subgenus Astele (Astelena)

== Description ==
The height of the shell attains 14 mm. The light-yellow turreted-conic shell is narrowly umbilicate. The eight whorls are nearly plane. They are encircled by numerous unequal granuliferous riblets. The sutural cingula are elevated, subundulate, spirally striate, and pallidly tessellate. The base of the shell is a little convex. It is covered with about 16 subgranose alternately larger and more delicate riblets. The umbilicus is narrow, surrounded by a white plate. The oblique columella terminates in a pearly denticle. The aperture is subtetragonal.

== Distribution ==
This marine species occurs off Southern Australia.
