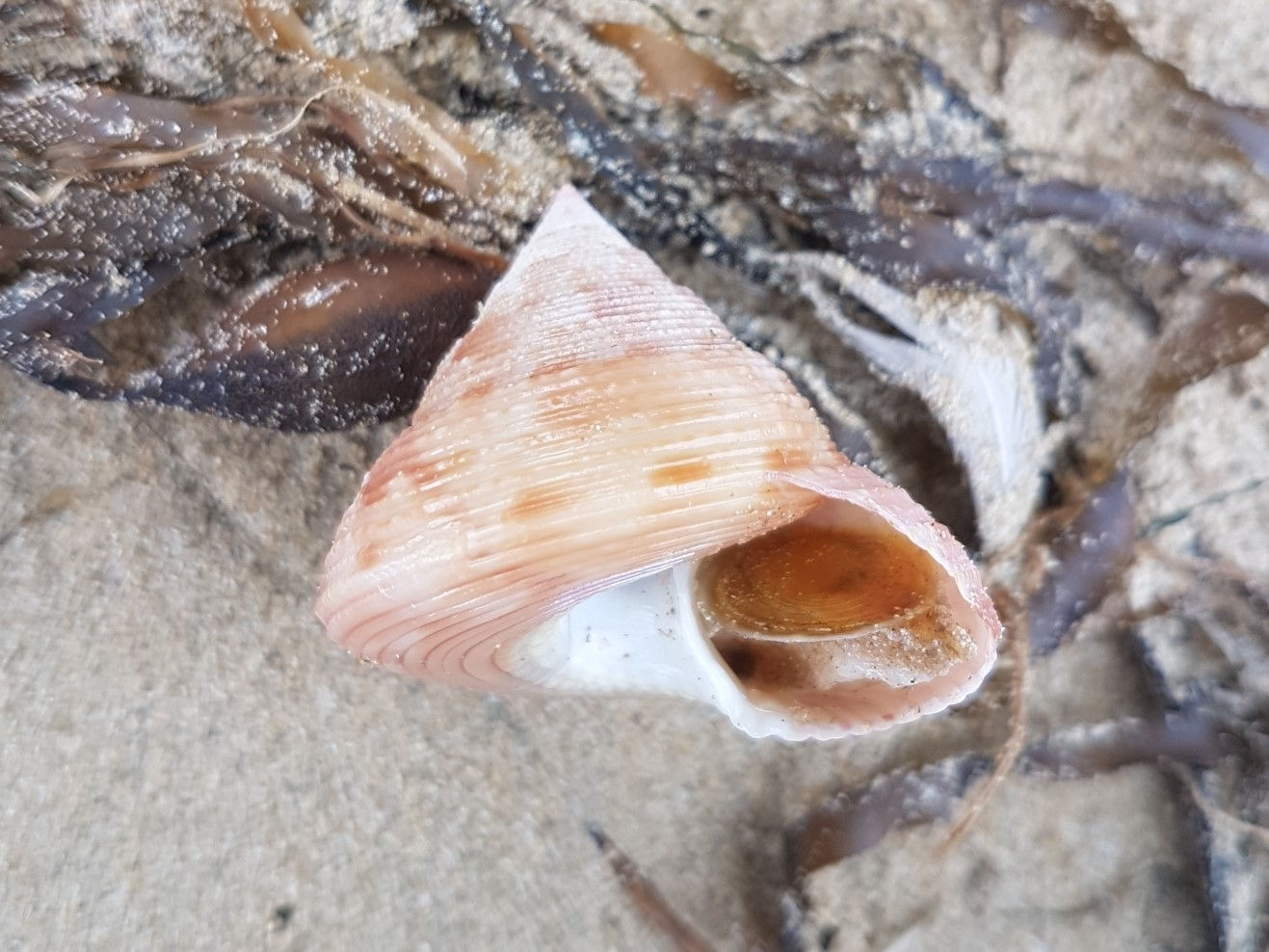

Scientific classification
- Kingdom: Animalia
- Phylum: Mollusca
- Class: Gastropoda
- Subclass: Vetigastropoda
- Order: Trochida
- Family: Calliostomatidae
- Subfamily: Calliostomatinae
- Genus: Astele
- Species: A. subcarinata

Binomial name
- Astele subcarinata Swainson, 1855

Synonyms
- Calliostoma adamsi Pilsbry, 1889; Calliostoma (Astele) subcarinatum (Swainson, W.A., 1855); Eutrochus perspectivus A. Adams, 1864 (original description); Trochus subcarinatus (Swainson, 1855)

= Astele subcarinata =

Species of gastropod

Astele subcarinata, common name the subcarinate top shell, is a species of sea snail, a marine gastropod mollusk in the family Calliostomatidae.

== Taxonomy and nomenclature ==
Some authors place this taxon in the subgenus Astele (Astele).

This species was the first marine mollusc to be described in an Australian scientific journal, by William Swainson in the Papers and proceedings of the Royal Society of Van Diemen’s Land (read before the Society March 1854, published 1855).

The name Astele signifies lack of a columnella.

== Description ==
The size of the shell varies between 25 mm and 40 mm. The rather thin shell has a depressed-conical shape and is broader than high. It is broadly and profoundly umbilicated. It has a pale, yellowish flesh-color, painted with tawny flammules and sparsely spotted. The seven whorls are plane, and transversely deeply lirate. The lirae are unequal. The whorls are subdistant, and angulate at the sutures. The body whorl is granulose around the umbilicus. The umbilicus is white on the inside. The aperture is sulcate inside.

== Distribution ==
This marine species occurs off Southern Australia and Tasmania.
