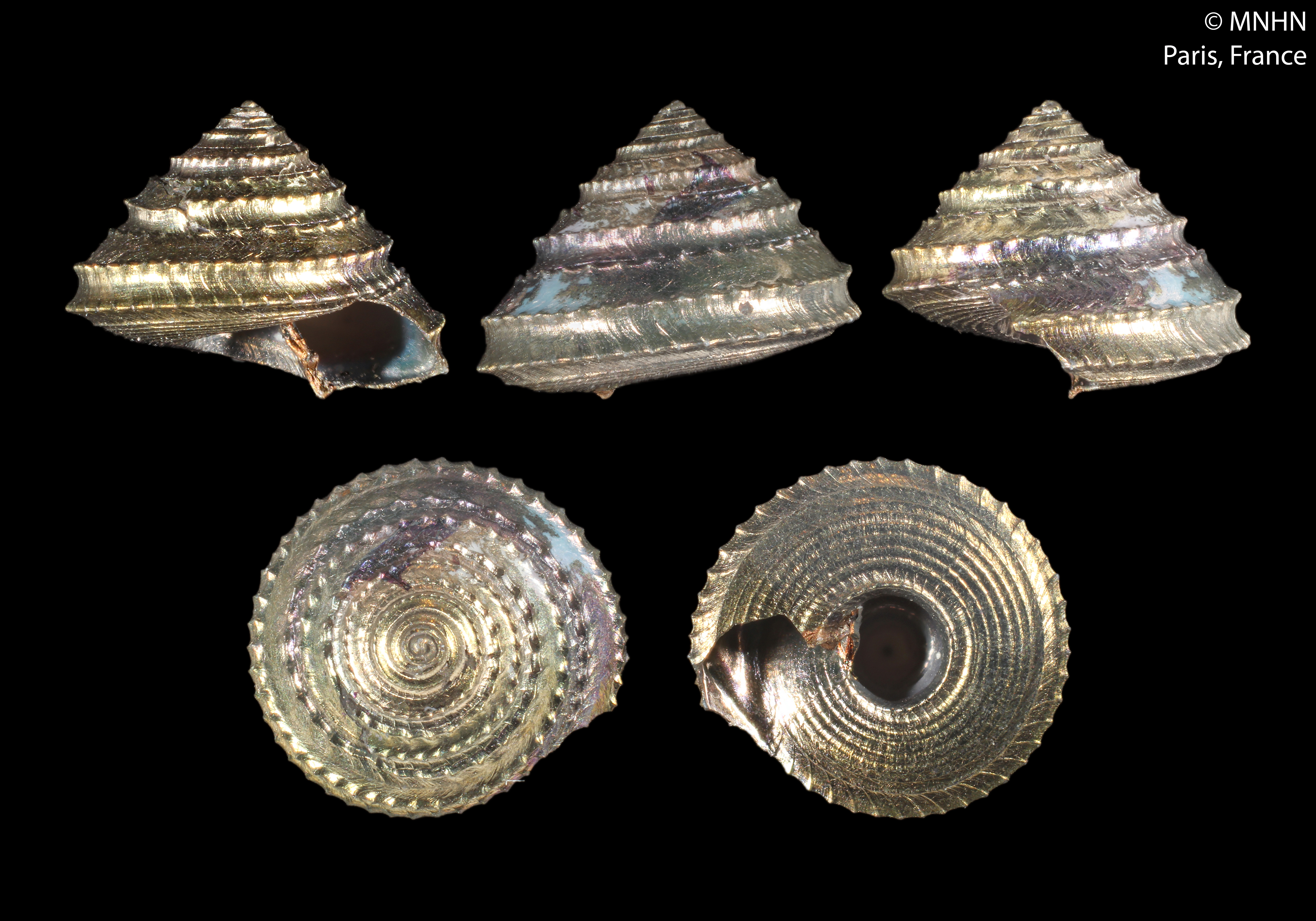
- Shell of Carenzia acanthodes (holotype at MNHN, Paris)

Scientific classification
- Kingdom: Animalia
- Phylum: Mollusca
- Class: Gastropoda
- Subclass: Vetigastropoda
- Superfamily: Seguenzioidea
- Family: Seguenziidae
- Subfamily: Seguenziinae
- Genus: Carenzia
- Species: C. acanthodes

Binomial name
- Carenzia acanthodes Marshall, 1991

= Carenzia acanthodes =

Species of gastropod

Carenzia acanthodes is a species of small deep water sea snail in the family Seguenziidae.

== Distribution ==
This marine species occurs off New Caledonia. The holotype was obtained from depths between 1,320 and 1,740 m (4,330 and 5,710 ft).

== Description ==
The shell can reach 5.1 mm (0.20 in) in width and is markedly wider than it is high.
