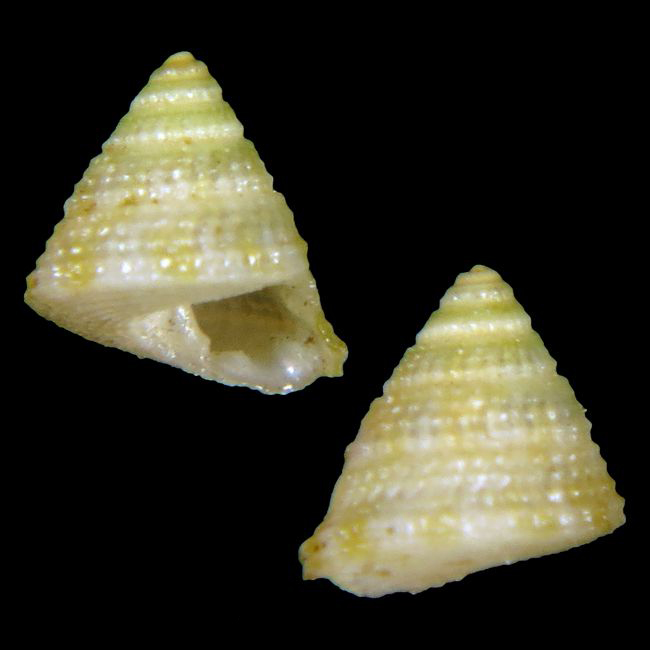

Scientific classification
- Kingdom: Animalia
- Phylum: Mollusca
- Class: Gastropoda
- Subclass: Vetigastropoda
- Family: Seguenziidae
- Genus: Calliobasis
- Species: C. gemmata

Binomial name
- Calliobasis gemmata Poppe, Tagaro & Stahlschmidt, 2015

= Calliobasis gemmata =

Species of gastropod

Calliobasis gemmata is a species of sea snail, a marine gastropod mollusk in the family Seguenziidae.

== Original description ==
- Poppe G.T., Tagaro S.P. & Stahlschmidt P. (2015). New shelled molluscan species from the central Philippines I. Visaya. 4(3): 15–59.

page(s): 18, pl. 3 figs 1–2.
