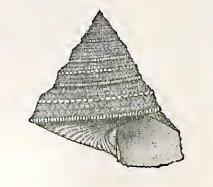
- Original drawing of a shell of Astele stenomphala

Scientific classification
- Kingdom: Animalia
- Phylum: Mollusca
- Class: Gastropoda
- Subclass: Vetigastropoda
- Order: Trochida
- Family: Calliostomatidae
- Subfamily: Calliostomatinae
- Genus: Astele
- Species: A. stenomphala

Binomial name
- Astele stenomphala E. A. Smith, 1898

= Astele stenomphala =

Species of gastropod

Astele stenomphala is a species of sea snail, a marine gastropod mollusk in the family Calliostomatidae.

== Description ==
The height of the shell attains 16 mm. The sharply conical shell is keeled and, narrowly umbilicate. The obtuse keel which ascends the spire above the suture is ornamented with close-set elongate tubercles. The granules upon the slight angulation at the middle of the whorls are somewhat larger than those above and below. The spire contains 9 whorls. The first one is smooth, polished, and spherical. The others are convex, subangulate in the middle, and flat below. There are about 14 concentric, slender lirae. The white umbilicus is narrow. The aperture has an irregularly square shape. The columella is barely perpendicular and at its base obsoletely tubercled. The polygyrous operculum is outwardly concave.

== Distribution ==
This marine species occurs off northwest Australia.
