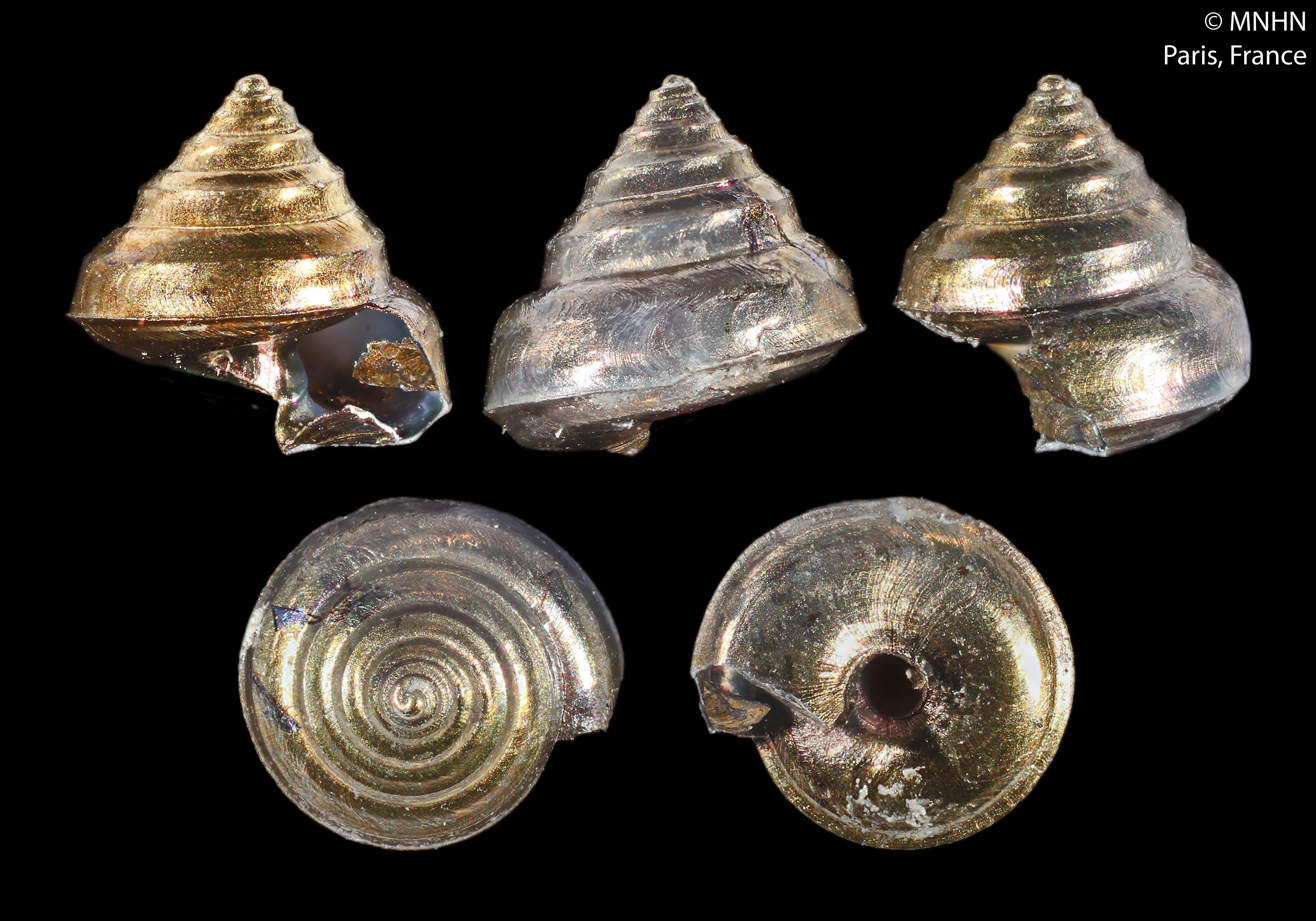
- Shell of Carenzia nitens (holotype at MNHN, Paris)

Scientific classification
- Kingdom: Animalia
- Phylum: Mollusca
- Class: Gastropoda
- Subclass: Vetigastropoda
- Superfamily: Seguenzioidea
- Family: Seguenziidae
- Subfamily: Seguenziinae
- Genus: Carenzia
- Species: C. nitens

Binomial name
- Carenzia nitens Marshall, 1991

= Carenzia nitens =

Species of gastropod

Carenzia nitens is a species of small deep water sea snail in the family Seguenziidae.

== Distribution ==
This marine species occurs off New Caledonia. The holotype was obtained from depths between 1,320 and 1,620 m (4,330 and 5,310 ft).

== Description ==
The shell can reach 2.6 mm (0.10 in) in width and is about as wide as it is high.
