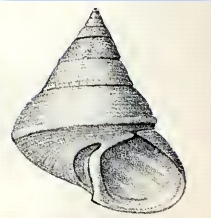
- Drawing with an apertural view of a shell of Astele scitula

Scientific classification
- Kingdom: Animalia
- Phylum: Mollusca
- Class: Gastropoda
- Subclass: Vetigastropoda
- Order: Trochida
- Family: Calliostomatidae
- Subfamily: Calliostomatinae
- Genus: Astele
- Species: A. scitula

Binomial name
- Astele scitula (A. Adams, 1854)

Synonyms
- Calliostoma (Astelena) scitulum (Adams, A. in Adams, H.G. & A. Adams, 1854); Eutrochus scitulus (A. Adams, 1854); Ziziphinus scitulus A. Adams, 1854

= Astele scitula =

Species of gastropod

Astele scitula is a species of sea snail, a marine gastropod mollusk in the family Calliostomatidae.

== Notes ==
Additional information regarding this species:

- Taxonomic remark: Some authors place this taxon in the subgenus Astele (Astelena)

== Description ==
The height of the shell attains 15 mm. This is a very distinct little shell, with slender spire, granulose upper whorls, and a wide, rather depressed body whorl.

The small, thin shell is umbilicate. It has a slender elevated spire and a broad body whorl. Its color is yellowish, obscurely maculate with brown. The seven whorls are convex. The apical whorls is smooth, following 3 or 4 granulate whorls. The rest is densely spirally striate, with light incremental lines which decussate the lirulae, especially beneath. The spire is slender, its lateral outlines concave. The body whorl is rounded at its periphery or obtusely angled, and convex beneath. The aperture is rounded. The outer and basal lips are thin, forming a half-circle. The white columella is deeply arcuate, ending in an inconspicuous tubercle at base. The deep umbilicus is funnel-shaped and bounded by an angle.

== Distribution ==
This marine species occurs from southern Queensland to South Australia.
