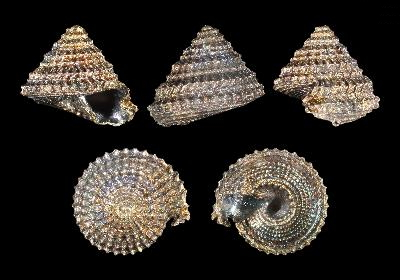
- Shell of Calliobasis merista (holotype in MNHN, Paris)

Scientific classification
- Kingdom: Animalia
- Phylum: Mollusca
- Class: Gastropoda
- Subclass: Vetigastropoda
- Superfamily: Seguenzioidea
- Family: Seguenziidae
- Subfamily: Seguenziinae
- Genus: Calliobasis
- Species: C. merista

Binomial name
- Calliobasis merista Marshall, 1991

= Calliobasis merista =

Species of gastropod

Calliobasis merista is a species of extremely small deep water sea snail, a marine gastropod mollusk in the family Seguenziidae.

== Distribution ==
This marine species occurs off New Caledonia.
