= Laetifautor spinulosus =

Scientific classification
- Kingdom: Animalia
- Phylum: Mollusca
- Class: Gastropoda
- Subclass: Vetigastropoda
- Order: Trochida
- Superfamily: Trochoidea
- Family: Calliostomatidae
- Subfamily: Calliostomatinae
- Genus: Laetifautor
- Species: L. spinulosus

Binomial name
- Laetifautor spinulosus (Tate, 1893)

Synonyms
- Calliostoma spinulosum Tate, 1893

Species of gastropod

Laetifautor spinulosus, common name the spine top shell, is a species of sea snail, a marine gastropod mollusk, in the family Calliostomatidae within the superfamily Trochoidea, the top snails, turban snails and their allies. This Indo-Pacific species exhibits a distinctive conical shell with prominent spiral cords bearing acute, scalelike spines—a morphology adapted for stability in high-energy intertidal zones. Distributed from Japan to New Caledonia, it inhabits coral rubble and algal substrates at 5–50 m depths. Like many calliostomatids, it is a selective feeder on sponges and bryozoans, using its specialized radula to scrape prey. Molecular studies confirm its placement in the resurrected genus Laetifautor, distinguished by mitochondrial 16S rRNA sequences.

== Description ==
The length of the shell attains 7 mm.

== Distribution ==
This marine species occurs off Southern Australia and Western Australia.
