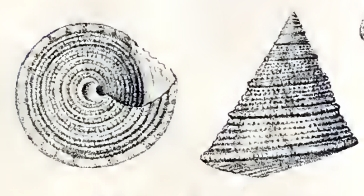
- Drawing with two views of a shell of Astele rubiginosa

Scientific classification
- Kingdom: Animalia
- Phylum: Mollusca
- Class: Gastropoda
- Subclass: Vetigastropoda
- Order: Trochida
- Family: Calliostomatidae
- Subfamily: Calliostomatinae
- Genus: Astele
- Species: A. rubiginosa

Binomial name
- Astele rubiginosa (Valenciennes, 1846)

Synonyms
- Calliostoma australis Broderip, 1835; Calliostoma broderipi Philippi, R.A., 1855; Calliostoma nobilis Philippi, R.A., 1849; Calliostoma splendidus Reeve, L.A., 1863; Trochus broderipi Philippi, 1855; Trochus gemmosus Reeve, 1842; Trochus nobilis Philippi, 1848; Trochus rubiginosus Valenciennes, 1846 (original description); Trochus splendidus Philippi, 1855

= Astele rubiginosa =

Species of gastropod

Astele rubiginosa is a species of sea snail, a marine gastropod mollusk in the family Calliostomatidae.

== Description ==
The size of the shell varies between 19 mm and 30 mm. The imperforate, rather thin shell has an acutely conical shape. The ten whorls are plane. The first one is eroded and smooth. The following whorls are whitish buff, radiately flamed with brown and reddish. They are spirally cingulate with six granose cinguli. The upper 5 are small, separated by equal interstices. The lower cingulus is wider, more prominent and subcrenate. The body whorl is acutely carinated. The base of the shell is concentrically encircled by about 7-8 granose cinguli, alternately buff and rose colored. The aperture is subquadrate. The outer lip is plicate. The columella is subarcuate. The base is subnodose, with a parallel groove.

== Distribution ==
This marine species occurs off Southern Australia and Tasmania.
