= Omphalotukaia hajimeanum =

Scientific classification
- Kingdom: Animalia
- Phylum: Mollusca
- Class: Gastropoda
- Subclass: Vetigastropoda
- Order: Trochida
- Family: Calliostomatidae
- Genus: Omphalotukaia
- Species: O. hajimeanum

Binomial name
- Omphalotukaia hajimeanum (Yoshida, 1948)

Synonyms
- Calliostoma hajimeana Yoshida, 1948; Calliostoma (Otukaia) hajimeanum Yoshida, 1948

Species of gastropod

Omphalotukaia hajimeanum is a species of sea snail, a marine gastropod mollusk in the family Calliostomatidae. This marine species occurs off Japan.
