= Quinnia patula =

Scientific classification
- Kingdom: Animalia
- Phylum: Mollusca
- Class: Gastropoda
- Subclass: Vetigastropoda
- Superfamily: Seguenzioidea
- Family: Seguenziidae
- Subfamily: Seguenziinae
- Genus: Quinnia
- Species: Q. patula

Binomial name
- Quinnia patula (Marshall, 1983)

Synonyms
- Seguenziella patula Marshall, 1983 (original description)

Species of gastropod

Quinnia patula is a species of extremely small deep water sea snail, a marine gastropod mollusk in the family Seguenziidae.

== Description ==
The white, thin, umbilicate, and depressed shell is markedly broader (8.35 mm) than high (5.65 mm). It is translucent nacreous.

== Distribution ==
This marine species occurs off New Caledonia and New Zealand at depths of about 1,800 m.
