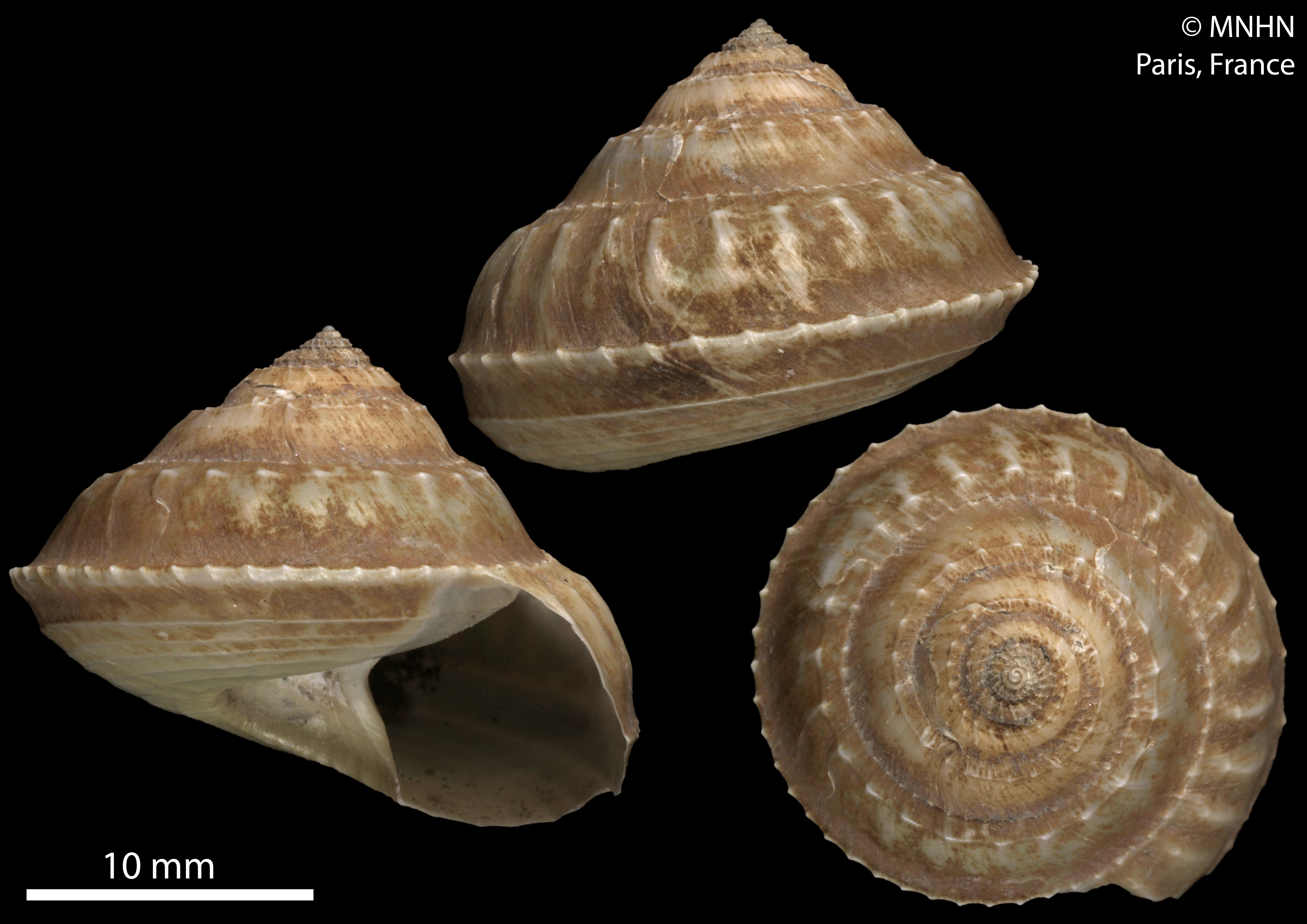
- Shell of Calliotropis midwayensis (specimen at MNHN, Paris)

Scientific classification
- Kingdom: Animalia
- Phylum: Mollusca
- Class: Gastropoda
- Subclass: Vetigastropoda
- Family: Calliotropidae
- Genus: Calliotropis
- Species: C. midwayensis

Binomial name
- Calliotropis midwayensis (Lan, 1990)

Synonyms
- Omphalotukaia midwayensis Lan, 1990

= Calliotropis midwayensis =

Species of gastropod

Calliotropis midwayensis is a species of sea snail, a marine gastropod mollusk in the family Eucyclidae.

== Distribution ==
This marine species occurs off Southern Taiwan.
