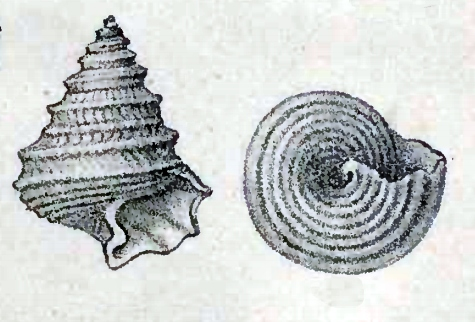
- Drawing with two views of a shell of Seguenzia monocingulata

Scientific classification
- Kingdom: Animalia
- Phylum: Mollusca
- Class: Gastropoda
- Subclass: Vetigastropoda
- Family: Seguenziidae
- Genus: Seguenzia
- Species: †S. monocingulata

Binomial name
- †Seguenzia monocingulata Seguenza, 1876

= Seguenzia monocingulata =

Extinct species of gastropod

Seguenzia monocingulata is an extinct species of sea snail, a marine gastropod mollusk in the family Seguenziidae. It resembles Seguenzia formosa and has been regarded as a synonym of that (extant) species. However the two species are distinct, based on shell morphology.

== Description ==
The height of the shell attains 4 mm. The white, imperforate shell has a high conoid shape. The whorls have revolving ribs, of which the last has about four distant prominent ones, besides minor striae on the base.

== Distribution ==
This species was originally described by Seguenza from Pliocene fossils found at Torrente Trapani, a locality of the city of Messina, Sicily. It is common in deep-sea deposits from southern Italy.
