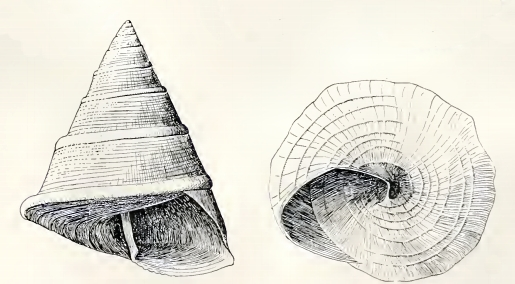
- Original drawing with two views of a shell of Callistele calliston

Scientific classification
- Kingdom: Animalia
- Phylum: Mollusca
- Class: Gastropoda
- Subclass: Vetigastropoda
- Order: Trochida
- Superfamily: Trochoidea
- Family: Trochidae
- Genus: Callistele
- Species: C. calliston

Binomial name
- Callistele calliston Verco, 1905

Synonyms
- Calliostoma (Callistele) calliston (Verco, J.C., 1905); Astele calliston Verco, 1905

= Callistele calliston =

Species of gastropod

Callistele calliston, common name the beautiful top shell, is a species of sea snail, a marine gastropod mollusk in the family Trochidae (unassigned to a subfamily).

== Description ==
(Original description Jos. C. Verco) The height of the shell attains 12 mm. The thin shell has a conical shape. The spire consists of nine whorls, including two smooth apical turns. The whorls are straight-sloping, with crowded spiral lirae, about 24 on the penultimate. They are crossed by oblique crowded accremental striae, producing sublenticular pitting. The suture is linear, immediately beneath the prominent peripheral cord which gradates the spire. The body whorl contains a suture that is slightly descending at the aperture. It has about 24 spiral threadlets. It is crowded with fine sinuous oblique accremental striae. The periphery is acutely angular, with a projecting rounded carina, spirally closely engraved on its upper surface adaxially crossed by rounded striae. These are much more distant than the accremental striae, provided at somewhat irregular intervals with 16 rounded invalid tubercles. The base of the shell is very flatly rounded with 7 concentric narrow lirae, the inner 4 closer than the rest, which are separated by 4 to 6 interlirate striae. The umbilicus is narrow, minutely axially incised. The aperture is oblique and roundly quadrate. The outer lip is slightly convex, thin, and smooth within The margin is sinuously convex below the suture, and concave towards the periphery. The basal lip is convex, slightly effuse, and smooth within. The upper third of the columella is concave, the rest is straight, and obliquely truncate below. The callus at the base partly borders the umbilicus and is attached to the columella along a vertical groove.

The shell is purple-brown, with somewhat oblique, axial, creamy, rhomboidal flames, extending from suture to suture, and nearly equalling the foundation colour in area. On the peripheral carina, and hence above the sutures, they are replaced by two or three creamy spots, while two or three less marked white spots occupy the intervals, and thus pick out the tubercles of the carina. Every whorl is encircled by four articulated colour bands, which in the white areas are of a more opaque white than the rest of these areas, and extend slightly beyond them, and are crossed by narrow vertical or oblique red lines, while in the purple areas they are of a deeper purple tint, and are crossed by narrow axial white lines. The base is of a lighter tint, the outer 6 cinguli of a rose pink, minutely dotted with creamy white. The columella and umbilicus are white, bordered outside with green, which tints the inner two basal cinguli, and curls around the columella into the throat. The inner edge of the outer lip is golden-brown and white, interior shining and nacreous.

The operculum is horny multispiral with a central nucleus. Aradial cellular fringe-like film extends over the inner three-fourths of each spiral.

The formula of the radula is ~ .1.5. 1.5.1. ~. The central rachidian is heart-shaped, narrow free end surmounted by small, slightly serrated denticle. The other rachidians have trilobed cusps, which gradually enlarge outwards. There is a single lateral with one cusp trilobed at its base. The many marginals are unicuspidate, and not serrated.

== Distribution ==
This marine species occurs off South Australia.
