= Omphalotukaia nobilis =

Scientific classification
- Kingdom: Animalia
- Phylum: Mollusca
- Class: Gastropoda
- Subclass: Vetigastropoda
- Order: Trochida
- Superfamily: Trochoidea
- Family: Calliostomatidae
- Genus: Omphalotukaia
- Species: O. nobilis

Binomial name
- Omphalotukaia nobilis (Hirase, 1922)

Synonyms
- Astele nobilis Hirase, 1922; Calliostoma nobile (Hirase, 1922)

Species of gastropod

Omphalotukaia nobilis is a species of sea snail, a marine gastropod mollusk, in the family Calliostomatidae within the superfamily Trochoidea, the top snails, turban snails and their allies.

== Distribution ==
This species occurs in Japan.
