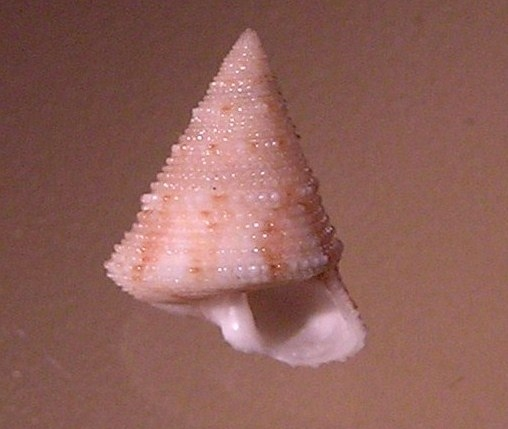

Scientific classification
- Kingdom: Animalia
- Phylum: Mollusca
- Class: Gastropoda
- Subclass: Vetigastropoda
- Order: Trochida
- Family: Calliostomatidae
- Genus: Calliostoma
- Species: C. scobinatum

Binomial name
- Calliostoma scobinatum (Reeve, 1863)

Synonyms
- Zizyphinus scobinatus Reeve, 1863; Laetifautor scobinatus (Reeve, 1863)

= Calliostoma scobinatum =

Species of gastropod

Calliostoma scobinatum is a species of sea snail in the family Calliostomatidae. Some authors place this taxon in the subgenus Calliostoma (Fautor).

== Description ==
The height of the shell varies between 6 and 13 mm (0.24 and 0.51 in).

== Distribution ==
This marine species occurs off India and the Philippines. Records from the Torres Strait (Australia) are likely erroneous.

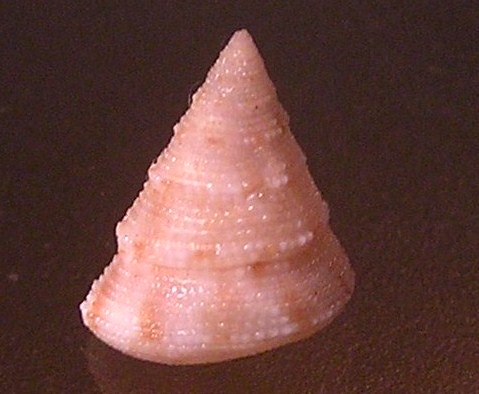
Abapertural view
