= Coralastele allanae =

Scientific classification
- Kingdom: Animalia
- Phylum: Mollusca
- Class: Gastropoda
- Subclass: Vetigastropoda
- Order: Trochida
- Superfamily: Trochoidea
- Family: Calliostomatidae
- Genus: Coralastele
- Species: C. allanae

Binomial name
- Coralastele allanae Iredale, 1930

Synonyms
- Astele allanae (Iredale, 1930)

Species of gastropod

Coralastele allanae is a species of sea snail, a marine gastropod mollusk, in the family Calliostomatidae within the superfamily Trochoidea, the top snails, turban snails and their allies.

== Distribution ==
This species occurs in Queensland.
