= Laetifautor rubropunctatus =

- Image of a shell of Laetifautor rubropunctatus

Scientific classification
- Kingdom: Animalia
- Phylum: Mollusca
- Class: Gastropoda
- Subclass: Vetigastropoda
- Order: Trochida
- Family: Calliostomatidae
- Subfamily: Calliostomatinae
- Genus: Laetifautor
- Species: L. rubropunctatus

Binomial name
- Laetifautor rubropunctatus (A. Adams, 1851)

Synonyms
- Calliostoma (Laetifautor) rubropunctatum (A. Adams, 1851); Ziziphinus rubropunctatus A. Adams, 1851

Species of gastropod

Laetifautor rubropunctatus is a species of sea snail, a marine gastropod mollusk in the family Calliostomatidae.

== Description ==
The small, buffish shell has an orbiculate-conic shape. It is ornamented with transverse spinulose cinguli (4 on the body whorl). The interstices are clathrate, beautifully dotted with red.

This species is readily recognized by its peculiar painting and remarkable sculpture. A.Adams describes the color as "lutescens." G.W. Tryon rather considers it pale fleshy pink, with dark red dots in the interstices between the oblique costae and the transverse or spiral ridges. The latter are said to be four in number on the body whorl. But on careful examination Tryon found six, of which four are, however, more prominent than the rest. The upper volutions are encircled by three principal lirae, and a fourth secondary one at the suture. The points of intersection of these spiral ridges and the oblique costae are produced into quite acute nodules or prickles. The base of the shell is almost flat, ornamented with about six concentric lirae, which are more or less granulous, with the interstices exhibiting strong lines of growth and translucent nacre. The color closely approaches the rest of the surface, varied with brown dots both upon and between the granules.

== Distribution ==
This marine species occurs off Japan, the Philippines and Australia.
