= Calliobasis bilix =

Scientific classification
- Kingdom: Animalia
- Phylum: Mollusca
- Class: Gastropoda
- Subclass: Vetigastropoda
- Superfamily: Seguenzioidea
- Family: Seguenziidae
- Subfamily: Seguenziinae
- Genus: Calliobasis
- Species: C. bilix

Binomial name
- Calliobasis bilix (Hedley, 1905)

Synonyms
- Astele bilix Hedley, 1905

Species of gastropod

Calliobasis bilix, common name the balanced top shell, is a species of small deep water sea snail in the family Seguenziidae. It is endemic to eastern Australia and found in the Tasman Sea.

== Description ==
The height of the shell is about 4 mm (0.16 in).
