= Astele monile =

- Drawing of a shell of Astele monile

Scientific classification
- Kingdom: Animalia
- Phylum: Mollusca
- Class: Gastropoda
- Subclass: Vetigastropoda
- Order: Trochida
- Family: Calliostomatidae
- Genus: Astele
- Species: A. monile

Binomial name
- Astele monile (Reeve, 1863)

Synonyms
- Calliostoma (Astele) monile (Reeve, L.A., 1863); Calliostoma (Laetifautor) monile (Reeve, 1863); Laetifautor monilis (Reeve, 1863); Zizyphinus monile Reeve, 1863

Species of gastropod

Astele monile, common name the Australian necklace, is a species of sea snail, a marine gastropod mollusk in the family Calliostomatidae.

Some authors place this taxon in the subgenus Astele (Astele)

== Description ==
The size of the shell varies between 15 mm and 25 mm. The shell has an erectly conical shape but is rather swollen at the base. It is transparent white, encircled by a necklace of violet spots. The whorls are concavely sloping, spirally ridged. These ridges are smooth with the two basal ridges more prominent. The necklace of violet spots has an exceedingly pretty appearance on the delicate transparent ground of the shell.

== Distribution ==
This marine species is endemic to Australia and occurs off Western Australia, Northern Territory and Queensland.
