= Coralastele pulcherrima =

Scientific classification
- Kingdom: Animalia
- Phylum: Mollusca
- Class: Gastropoda
- Subclass: Vetigastropoda
- Order: Trochida
- Superfamily: Trochoidea
- Family: Calliostomatidae
- Genus: Coralastele
- Species: C. pulcherrima

Binomial name
- Coralastele pulcherrima (G. B. Sowerby III, 1914)

Synonyms
- Astele pulcherrima (G. B. Sowerby III, 1914); Eutrochus pulcherrimus G. B. Sowerby III, 1914

Species of gastropod

Coralastele pulcherrima is a species of sea snail, a marine gastropod mollusk, in the family Calliostomatidae within the superfamily Trochoidea, the top snails, turban snails and their allies.

== Description ==
The size of the shell varies between 6 mm and 10 mm.

== Distribution ==
This species occurs in Philippines.
