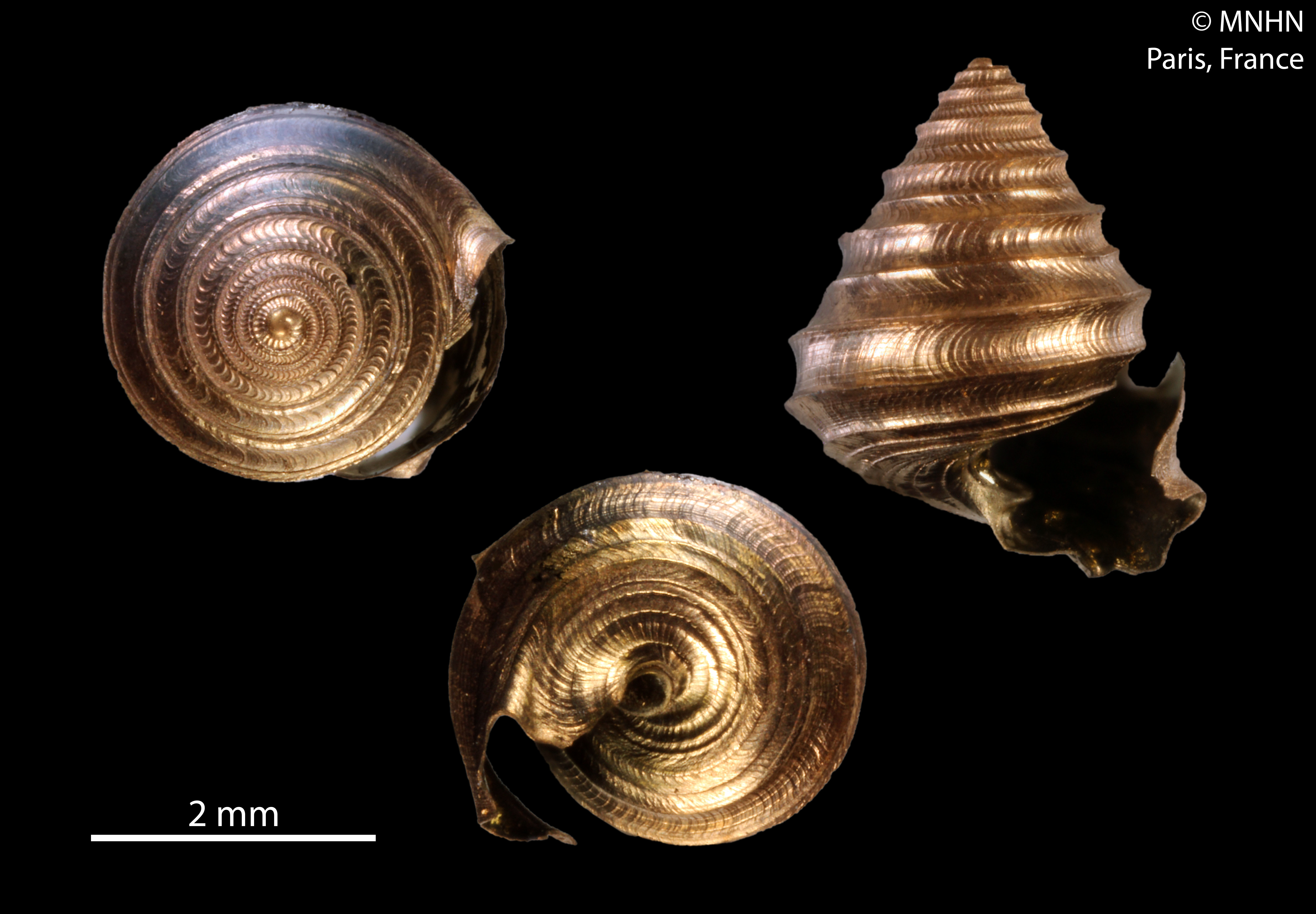
- Shell of Seguenzia formosa (specimen at MNHN, Paris)

Scientific classification
- Kingdom: Animalia
- Phylum: Mollusca
- Class: Gastropoda
- Subclass: Vetigastropoda
- Superfamily: Seguenzioidea
- Family: Seguenziidae
- Subfamily: Seguenziinae
- Genus: Seguenzia
- Species: S. formosa

Binomial name
- Seguenzia formosa Jeffreys, 1876

= Seguenzia formosa =

Species of gastropod

Seguenzia formosa is a species of extremely small deep water sea snail, a marine gastropod mollusk in the family Seguenziidae. The epithet "formosa" means "beautiful".

It resembles Seguenzia monocingulata and has been regarded as a synonym of that (extinct) species. However the two species are distinct, based on shell morphology.

== Description ==
(Original description by J.G. Jeffreys) The rather thin, semitransparent, nacreous and glossy shell has a globosely conical shape.

The sculpture of the shell shows sharp keel-like spiral ribs or ridges, of which there are two on the middle of the body whorl (besides ten thread-like riblets on the base) and one on the middle of each of the other whorls. There is also a slighter rib immediately below the suture. Between the ribs the surface is covered with numerous and delicate curved striae, which turn alternately in different directions, so as to give a flexuous character to this part of the sculpture. The striae between the infrasutural and peripheral rib turn of the left, while those between the peripheral and the next rib (or in the upper whorls between the rib in the middle and the base) turn to the right. The same alternate order is to a great extent observable as to the direction of the striae on the base of the body whorl. These striae are crossed by fine close-set spiral lines, producing a reticulated appearance. All the whorls are similarly sculptured, except the top whorl or apex, which is smooth.

The colour of the shell is pearly white.

The suture is marked by the uppermost rib. The spire is turreted. The seven whorls are somewhat convex and gradually enlarging. The last takes up three fifths of the shell. The apex is globular. The large aperture is indented by the spiral ribs. The thin outer lip is prominent, and deeply scalloped. The inner lip is thick and folded back on the columella, which is short and incurved. At the bottom of the columella is a small but sharp tooth-like projection, below which is a short and abrupt notch. The groove or slit on the upper part of the body whorl, and the opening from the aperture (which characterizes the genus), is wide and deep, terminating in a curved indentation. The base of the shell is somewhat concave, but imperforate or without any umbilicus. There is no operculum.

== Distribution ==
This species occurs in the Atlantic Ocean off the Bay of Biscay, off Spain and Portugal at depths between 1,300 m and 1,400 m; also off South-east Brazil.
