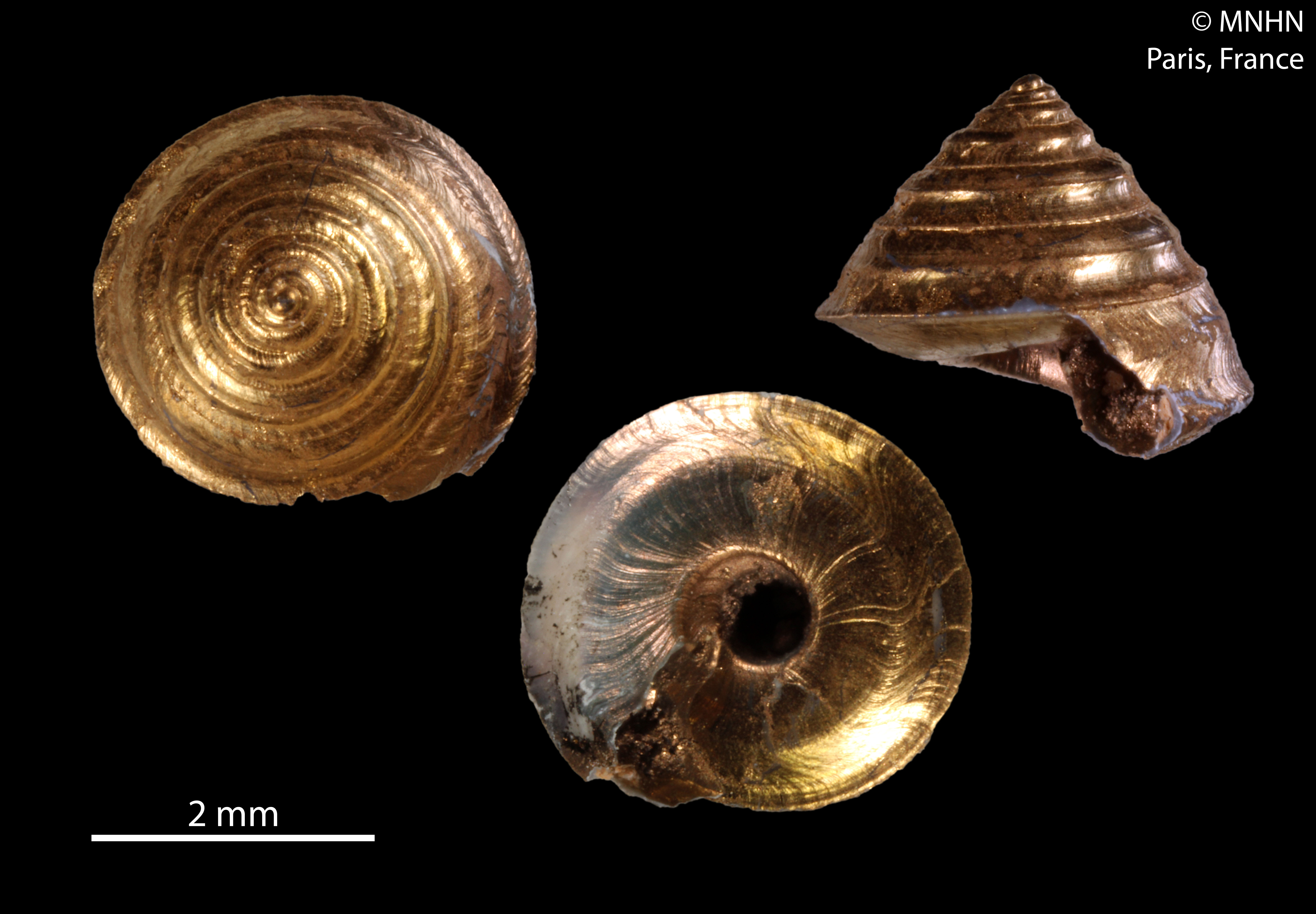
- Shell of Carenzia carinata (specimen at MNHN, Paris)

Scientific classification
- Kingdom: Animalia
- Phylum: Mollusca
- Class: Gastropoda
- Subclass: Vetigastropoda
- Family: Seguenziidae
- Genus: Carenzia
- Species: C. carinata

Binomial name
- Carenzia carinata (Jeffreys, 1877)

Synonyms
- Seguenzia carinata Jeffreys, 1877 (original description); Seguenzia carinata var. attenuata Locard, 1898

= Carenzia carinata =

Species of gastropod

Carenzia carinata is a species of sea snail, a marine gastropod mollusk in the family Seguenziidae.

== Description ==
The size of the shell varies between 2.7 mm and 4.4 mm. The shell thin, transparent, glossy, but not nacreous forms a depressed cone. Its color is glassy. The shell is umbilicated and rather smooth. The sculpture of the shell shows a single, sharp keel round the periphery, showing at the base of the spire-whorls. The shell has a thread-like spiral rib below the rather deep suture of each whorl (varying in position), numerous but slight flexuous striae below the rib, and in some specimens minute close-set curved longitudinal striae on the upper whorls. The base is nearly smooth or marked only with microscopic lines of growth. The seven whorls of the short spire are compressed, slightly shouldered by the infrasutural rib. The body whorl is disproportionally large, and the first is globular. The narrow aperture is rhomboidal, angulated in the middle by the keel, and below by the base of the columella. The outer lip is thin. The inner lip filmy and spread on the base. The columella is very short and incurved. It is furnished near the bottom with a small tooth-like process, below which is a short notch. The groove is broad, apparently not deep. It occupies the middle of the body whorl between the suture and the peripheral keel. The umbilicus is narrow but deep, exposing all the whorls, encircled and defined by a slight rib.

== Distribution ==
This species occurs on both sides of the Atlantic Ocean off Florida, USA - Brazil, the Azores, Northwest Africa and the Cape Verdes.
