= Old Edinburgh Club =

Local history society of Edinburgh, Scotland

The Old Edinburgh Club (OEC) is the local history society for the city of Edinburgh, the capital of Scotland. The OEC is one of the oldest history societies in Scotland, inaugurated in 1908 and was established to collect evidence of Edinburgh's history and local traditions: objectives which remain to this day. Its first honorary president was the former Prime Minister, Archibald Primrose, the 5th Earl of Rosebery.

The Club coordinates a series of lectures, October to March, year on a range of Edinburgh-related topics and publishes the annual journal, the Book of the Old Edinburgh Club. Summer visits and guided walks are organized for members and, additionally, grants and bursaries are awarded for projects, research and collaborations relating to Edinburgh's history.

The OEC is a member of the Scottish Local History Forum, and of the British Association for Local History. It is registered as a charity (SC007177) by the Office of the Scottish Charity Regulator.

== History ==
The OEC was founded early in 1908 by a group who were passionate about the history, architecture and culture of the city. It was initiated by William Hay, a bookseller and curator of John Knox's House on the High Street. The Club first met in January 1908 in Edinburgh City Chambers, the head office of what is now City of Edinburgh Council.

Members at the first meeting agreed the constitution including the club's objectives: "The collection and authentication of oral and written statements or documentary evidence relating to Edinburgh; the gathering of existing traditions, legends, and historical data; and the selecting and printing of material desirable for future reference". The early history of the club, including Rosebery's involvement has been recounted by historian Owen Dudley Edwards.

Notable members of the Club have included:

- Lord Lyon King of Arms, Sir James Balfour Paul
- engineer and antiquarian, Charles Boog Watson
- architectural historian, Charles McKean
- social historian, Professor Robert Morris
- urban historian, Professor Richard Rodger

The OEC promotes relevant research, improving access to records and generating fresh interest in the city's history.

== The Book of the Old Edinburgh Club ==
The Club produces an annual journal, The Book of the Old Edinburgh Club. Prominent in the first issue in 1908 was an article, "Provisional List of Old Houses Remaining in the High Street and Canongate of Edinburgh" by Bruce J Home. This revealed that "since 1860, two-thirds of the ancient buildings in the Old Town of Edinburgh have been demolished". This topic reflected an early priority of Club members to preserve historic buildings, especially in the light of pressures to clear slums and redevelop the Old Town. This theme has recurred from time to time, as demonstrated by coverage in The Scotsman newspaper.

More than 50 volumes and 300 learned articles have been published to date. The contents of the Book have been reviewed in scholarly journals from time to time. For example, the Scottish Historical Review featured pieces on the history of the Burgh Muir in 1920 and on George Square in 1950. Paton in 1953 noted the significance of the Book of the Old Edinburgh Club for enhancing to the store of knowledge that underpinned the Ancient Monuments Commission's Inventory of Historical Monuments in Edinburgh.

More recent topics have included the British Linen Company and its slavery connection; the evolution of Edinburgh's Royal Botanic Garden; the Edinburgh Association for Improving the Condition of the Poor; James Nicolson, a Jacobite Martyr from Leith; and the role of Sir Walter Scott in inventing Scotch Baronial Architecture. Volumes published between 1908 and 2008 have been digitized and are accessible on the Club's website.

== Lectures and visits ==
In addition to this journal, the Club arranges annual programmes of talks and visits. In 2022–23, the lectures featured topics including education in Edinburgh (on secondary schools and on school design pre-1880), 'Going to the Pictures' and the research networks of the Royal Observatory. ] Every summer, the Club organises visits and walks.

== Projects ==
The OEC has helped to fund projects such as the Southside Graveyards project, which has restored more than 200 gravestones in Grange Cemetery in collaboration with the Grange Association and the City Council. It provides an annual prize at the University of Edinburgh for postgraduate research on the city's history and has co-funded research into the public sculpture of Edinburgh which contributed to a two-volume publication in 2018.

=== Grants and bursaries ===
The club has benefitted from legacies, enabling it to offer grants and bursaries. It launched the Jean Guild Grants programme in April 2023 and awarded several project and research grants. These include Old Edinburgh Reborn which combines CGI techniques with historic sources to create photorealistic images of 1700s Edinburgh, and 'Reviving the Trinity Stones', a project of the Trinity Network to identify stones which were once part of the Trinity Apse but used in later buildings in the city.

The OEC has awarded two Jean Butchart Bursaries to postgraduate students: one to assist Edinburgh City Libraries in cataloguing their unique manuscript collection, the other to improve the online visibility of articles contained in the Book of the Old Edinburgh Club. The Library Service has published several blog articles on finds amongst the manuscripts, such as one on a 1705 'Journey to Edenborough' and the notebooks of engineer and antiquarian Charles Boog Watson who meticulously recorded much about the city, notably its streets and the closes and wynds of the Old Town.

=== Bibliography of Edinburgh History and building records ===
The OEC has created an online Bibliography of Edinburgh History containing over 2,000 books, articles and other documents, intended as a first stop for anyone researching the city's history. It has also helped to fund the cataloguing and digitization of petitions and drawings submitted to the Dean of Guild and held by Edinburgh City Archives, undertaken by Dr Joe Rock. This provides a directory of proposals for new development and building alterations between 1700 and 1824, including the period of the New Town's construction.
