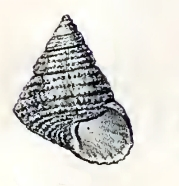
- Drawing with an apertural view of a shell of Phanerolepida transenna

Scientific classification
- Kingdom: Animalia
- Phylum: Mollusca
- Class: Gastropoda
- Subclass: Vetigastropoda
- Order: Trochida
- Family: Turbinidae
- Genus: Phanerolepida
- Species: P. transenna

Binomial name
- Phanerolepida transenna (Watson, 1879)

Synonyms
- Calliostoma transenna (Watson, 1879); Trochus (Ziziphinus) transenna Watson, 1879 (original description)

= Phanerolepida transenna =

Species of gastropod

Phanerolepida transenna is a rare species of sea snail, a marine gastropod mollusk in the family Turbinidae, the turban snails.

It is the sole living species in this genus.

== Description ==
The small, high, carinated shell has a sturdy turbinate shape. It is inflated on the base, thin, and sculptured. Its color pattern is yellowish with small ruddy spots.

The sculpture consists of spirals with quasi unique net-like, finely incised rhombohedral patterns. A similar (but not identical) surface pattern appears in Homalopoma granuliferum Nomura & Hatai, 1940 (family Colloniidae). Close to the suture is a row of disconnected beads. Between this and the carina are three rows of appressed beads, of which the highest is the weakest. These four rows are parted from one another by furrows, each of which is a little broader than the thread above it. The carina also consists of a row of appressed beads. It is stronger than the other beads both in breadth and height, and the furrow above it is a little broader and deeper than the rest. On the base are seven rows of appressed beads of nearly equal width and distance from one another; the first joins the outer lip, the central row twines up the pillar. These rows of beads make their appearance on the second whorl, and on all the upper whorls more than on the body whorl. The carina is sharply expressed by a constriction above and below it.

Longitudinals—the whole surface is crossed obliquely by not quite contiguous threads, which are almost as strong as the spirals. Between the threads are narrow, deep, long pits. Each alternate thread is crowned by a bead at the suture.

Color: the surface is dull and rough, yellowish, sparsely spotted on the spirals with a ruddy brown, which is almost crimson on the infra-sutural beads.

The spire is high and conical, the whorls being barely rounded. The apex is small but flattened, the embryonic 1 1/4 whorls scarcely project. The seven whorls increase in size in a regular manner. they are almost flat, while the body whorl alone is slightly convex, rounded, and carinated at the periphery and tumid on the base, in the center of which is a most minute umbilical chink. The suture is deeply and squarely impressed below the carina. The aperture is slightly oblique, squarish, and nacreous. The outer lip is very thin, very slightly descending, and drawn in a little horizontally at its junction with the body, and then well rounded in its whole sweep to the point of the columellar lip, near which it is externally crenulated by the ends of the basal threads. The columella is short, straight, slightly tubercled on its inner side, hardly toothed in front, and still less angulated at its junction with the outer lip. The columellar lip is very thin, slightly excavated longitudinally, and reverted on the minute umbilicus, which it almost wholly conceals. Behind it is a very narrow furrow.

The thin operculum has a concave-convex shape with no visible external spirals. The callus is extensively developed.

== Distribution ==
This deep-water species occurs off the Philippines and Japan between 600 m and 800 m.
