= Emotions across Time, Languages, and Cultures =

The Emotions across Time, Languages, and Cultures (EMOTLC) research laboratory is an interdisciplinary academic group based at the University of Castilla–La Mancha (UCLM) in Spain. Founded in 2003, the lab investigates the historical and cultural dimensions of emotion, particularly through linguistic, literary, and social lenses. It is housed within the Department of Modern Languages at UCLM’s Faculty of Arts and involves scholars from linguistics, history, anthropology, and psychology.

== History and leadership ==
The lab was established in 2003 with the goal of studying emotional expression and understanding across diverse historical periods and languages. It is led by Javier E. Díaz-Vera, professor of English linguistics at UCLM, whose research includes work in historical linguistics, sociolinguistics, and cognitive linguistics. Díaz-Vera has published on topics related to language change and emotion semantics in historical contexts.

== Members ==
- Javier E. Díaz-Vera: Professor of Linguistic Variation and Change at the University of Castilla–La Mancha, specializing in the interplay between language, emotion, and identity across history. His research spans verbal and non-verbal expressions of emotion in a variety of modern and historical languages, including English, Japanese, Hebrew, Icelandic, Latin, Spanish, and Portuguese, combining linguistic and interdisciplinary approaches to explore how communication shapes cultural evolution. He is currently engaged in the study of the situatedness of aesthetic emotions in European and East Asian contexts.
- Teodoro Manrique-Antón: Associate Professor in the Department of Modern Philology at the UCLM, specializing in North Germanic languages. He earned his PhD from the University of Salamanca and focuses his research on Scandinavian languages, literature, and cultural studies, contributing to both teaching and scholarly work in the field.
- Edel Porter: Associate Professor in the Department of Modern Philology at the UCLM, specializing in medieval Scandinavian literature, focusing on Old Norse, poetics, and the history of emotions. She holds a PhD in English from the University of Leeds and has taught in Ireland, the UK, and Spain. Since 2015, she has been a Senior Lecturer at the University of Castilla-La Mancha, with research spanning skaldic poetry, Norse-Iberian encounters, and the cultural history of emotions.
- Francisco Javier Minaya-Gómez: Associate Profesor in the Department of Modern Philology at the UCLM. His research examines the experience of beauty in the Anglo-Saxon period, with a particular focus on Old English poetry. He combines cognitive, historical, and computational linguistic approaches with art history and literary analysis to explore the intersections of aesthetics, language, and culture.
- José Miguel Alcolado-Carnicero: is a PhD student at the UCLM and a member of the EMOTLC research group. His research focuses on historical sociolinguistics, particularly multilingual practices across different communities and time periods. His doctoral work examines language-contact phenomena in medieval England, with a special focus on the influence of French-origin vocabulary on the expression of emotions after the Norman Conquest.
- Yadi Si: is a member of the EMOTLC research group. Her work focuses on the study of conceptual metaphors in East Asian and European languages, particularly Chinese and Spanish. Using corpus-based methods, she explores similarities and differences in metaphor use across cultures, with an emphasis on how metaphors reflect and shape affective and cognitive experiences. Her research also contributes to broader interdisciplinary discussions involving linguistics, cultural studies, and history.
- Gabriela Díaz-Díaz: is a member of the EMOTLC research group. She is a student in the International Master in Sociolinguistics and Multilingualism (Vytautas Magnus University, Lithuania). Her research explores the relationship between emotion expressions and identity construction, an underexplored area within cognitive linguistics. She focuses in particular on how processes of othering are shaped through emotion metaphors and metonymies across different cultural and linguistic contexts.

== Research themes ==
Since 2023, the lab has organized its work into three thematic research clusters:

- Positive Emotions: The Glue of Societies

This line of research explores how positive emotions such as joy, empathy, and gratitude have historically contributed to social cohesion and institutional development.

- Affective Landscapes and Performativity

This theme examines the embodied and performative nature of emotions as shaped by social and spatial contexts, including rituals, built environments, and interpersonal interactions.

- Shaping Identities through the Affects

This cluster investigates the role of emotion in the construction of personal and collective identities, with attention to emotions such as fear, pride, and resentment in national and cultural narratives.

== Selected publications ==
EMOTLC researchers have contributed to publications on the history of emotions, linguistic expression, and cultural studies. These include Javier E. Díaz-Vera’s Positive Emotions in Old English Language and Thought: An Emotion Family Approach, which examines emotion expressions in historical texts. The volume Cultural Models for Emotions in the North Atlantic Vernaculars, 700–1400 explores emotional frameworks in medieval Celtic, Norse-Icelandic, and Early English sources. Another example is the article Mapping Conceptual Variation through A Thesaurus of Old English and Evoke: Towards a Topical Thesaurus of Old English Emotional Expressions, which studies the semantic organisation of shame-related vocabulary in Old English and its visualisation through digital lexicographic tools.

== Collaborations ==
Between 2012 and 2018, lab director Díaz-Vera was affiliated with the ARC Centre of Excellence for the History of Emotions at the University of Western Australia. EMOTLC has also collaborated with the National Research Council of Italy on historical linguistics projects, including the development of a WordNet for Old English. EMOTLC is also a member of the European Lexicographic Infrastructure (ELEXIS), which coordinates international initiatives in lexicography and semantics. Since 2024, EMOTLC has participated in the Old Norse Emotion Network funded by the Arts and Humanities Research Council.

== Funding ==
The lab has received funding from national and international sources, including the European Commission and the Spanish Ministry of Science and Innovation, as well as the Arts and Humanities Research Council.

== Recognition ==
EMOTLC's work has been cited in scholarly literature on the history of emotions and historical linguistics. Its members have presented at academic conferences and contributed to edited volumes in related fields. Díaz-Vera's and Manrique-Antón's translations of Icelandic sagas into Spanish have also been recognized in various publications.
