= Turbonilla kymatoessa =

Scientific classification
- Kingdom: Animalia
- Phylum: Mollusca
- Class: Gastropoda
- Family: Pyramidellidae
- Genus: Turbonilla
- Species: T. kymatoessa

Binomial name
- Turbonilla kymatoessa (Watson, 1886)

Synonyms
- Odostomia kymatoessa Watson, 1886; Chemnitzia kymatoessa Watson, 1886

Species of gastropod

Turbonilla kymatoessa is a species of sea snail, a marine gastropod mollusk in the family Pyramidellidae, the pyrams and their allies.

== Description ==
The shell grows to a length of 3 mm.

== Distribution ==
This marine species occurs off Puerto Rico.
