= Graeme Morton =

Graeme Morton may refer to:

- Graeme Morton (historian), Scottish historian
- Graeme Morton (musician), Australian composer and conductor
