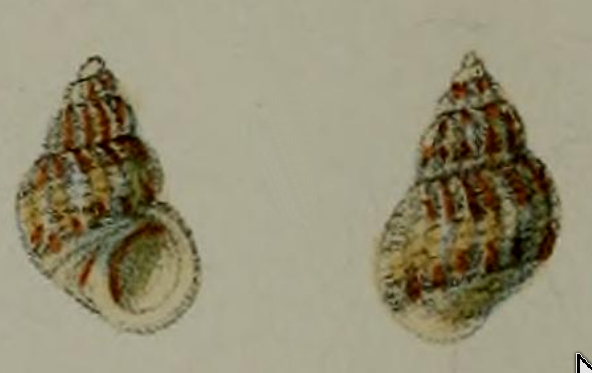
- Drawing of a shell of Alvania euchila (holotype)

Scientific classification
- Kingdom: Animalia
- Phylum: Mollusca
- Class: Gastropoda
- Subclass: Caenogastropoda
- Order: Littorinimorpha
- Superfamily: Rissooidea
- Family: Rissoidae
- Genus: Alvania
- Species: A. euchila

Binomial name
- Alvania euchila (Watson, 1886)

Synonyms
- Rissoa euchila R. B. Watson, 1886; Rissoa novarensis R. B. Watson, 1873

= Alvania euchila =

Species of gastropod

Alvania euchila is a species of sea snail, a marine gastropod mollusk or micromollusk in the Rissoidae family.

== Description ==
The shell reaches 2 mm in length.

The shell has a conic-oval shape, not rising in steps. It is somewhat solid, glossy, brilliant, and subopalescent.

Its sculpture features (20 to 30) longitudinal ribs that are narrow, flexuous and about as wide as their intervals. They diminish in number on the upper whorls and die out on the base of the shell. The labial rib is thick and strong. The body whorl has about 14 spiral threads that are slightly broader below than above periphery, where they sometimes evanesce. They are about twice as broad as their interstices. Six of these usually appear on the penultimate whorl, but they become too indeterminate for counting. They are always most distinct in the rib-intervals. On the rib-crests they tend to evanesce. Besides these, the surface is covered with faint longitudinal lines. On the upper whorls fine microscopic spiral lines can sometimes be traced. On the embryonic 1½ whorl, about twelve closely and finely stippled spiral lines are visible.

The shell is yellowish white, opalescent on ribs, with three broad irregular and interrupted bands or series of spots of a clear yellowish brown, darkest near the aperture. The first is below the suture, the second at the periphery, the third on base. The first and second tend to coalesce behind the labial rib, at which point the third series also expands, crossing the rib and staining the aperture's lower outer corner, whose outer edge has a brown tinge.

The belly is yellow, and the columella and labial rib are white. The tip of the embryonic shell is chestnut brown.

The spire is a short broad cone, terminating in a blunt flattened apex. At its centre the brown tip swells into sight. It contains 4 to 5 whorls, flattened to form a continuous straight, rapidly increasing slope from tip to periphery. The suture is straight, shallow, and narrow and distinct. The aperture is oval, slightly pointed above, contracted on its outer upperside, but expanded on the base. The outer lip is thickened by a heavy white rib, somewhat incurved above, and there beveled from the outside to a sharp edge, while on the base the beveling is from the inside entirely. This labial rib lies back from the edge. Beyond it, the aperture's sharp edge is scored by fine longitudinal lines. The inner lip is barely detached from the columella, so as to leave a slight chink. It is continued thickly across the belly, and meets the outer lip in a rounded and somewhat padded angle.

== Distribution ==
This species occurs in the Atlantic Ocean near Madeira.
