= Cumbria County History Trust =

UK charity

- Established: May 2010; 16 years ago
- Location: Cumbria, England
- Website: www.cumbriacountyhistory.org.uk

The Cumbria County History Trust (CCHT) is a charity launched in May 2010 to coordinate and gather resources for the Victoria County History of Cumbria project, a collaborative community project created to research and write the histories of all parts of Cumbria, and to make historical information generally available, within the framework and standards of the Victoria County History of England.

== General ==
The aim of CCHT is to initiate a step-change in the awareness and understanding of Cumbria's local historical heritage, by harnessing the enthusiasm for local history which exists widely across Cumbria, and pooling expertise. Its ultimate aim is to write the history of every town and village in England. To date, a team of over 100 volunteers from across Cumbria has compiled brief histories for each of the 348 parishes/townships in the county, using the Civil Parishes as they existed around 1900. Edited versions of these histories can be found on each place page of on the CCHT website and have been published as a book, Cumbria: An Historical Gazetteer. In addition, a smaller core of volunteers has been researching and writing full parish/township histories, in the standard style of the Victoria County History. Please see the Completed Draft Histories section on the project website for more details about their progress. Our first VCH parish history was published in March 2018 and covers the three fellside villages of Kirkowald, Staffield and Renwick. See Richard Brockington and Sarah Rose, The Victoria History of Cumberland: Kirkoswald and Renwick (University of London, 2019). Ultimately, CCHT aims to cover the whole of Cumbria in 16 'Red Books'. The first, for the Lonsdale Ward in Westmorland, is due to be published in late 2024.

== Early work ==
No VCH town or village histories had been published for the historic counties of Cumberland and Westmorland before the VCH Cumbria project was launched in 2010; the only parts of Cumbria previously to have been researched in detail by the VCH were those parts which were formerly in Lancashire. The story of the early attempts to publish a VCH for Cumberland and Westmorland has been told by John Beckett in a paper in the Transactions of the Cumberland and Westmorland Antiquarian and archaeological Society, New Series, vol XI, (2011) pp. 207–225doi:10.5284/1064012

=== Lancashire ===
The Furness and Cartmel areas (Lonsdale North of the Sands) were covered in VCH Lancashire, Volume VIII (published in 1910)

=== Cumberland ===
Two introductory volumes were published in the early twentieth century, Volume 1 (1901), which covered Early Man, Pre-Norman Remains, Introduction to and Texts of the Cumberland Domesday, Early Pipe Rolls, and Testa de Nevill and Volume II (1905) which covered Political History, Industries, Sport Ancient and Modern, Forestry. The first VCH parish history of Cumberland was published in March 2018 – Richard Brockington and Sarah Rose, The Victoria History of Cumberland: Kirkoswald and Renwick (University of London, 2019).

=== Westmorland ===
Nothing has been published to date

== Resources ==
The CCHT website aims to be the major online source for the history of Cumbria. Included among the many resources on there is a full transcript of Cumbrian Census figures from 1801 to 2001, by ward. Each place page contains links to a number of place-specific sources, including the most relevant papers in the CWAAS Transactions. There is a range of images available for download from the Gallery, including images taken from:

- Hutchinson's History of the County of Cumberland, Vol 1 1794
- Sketches and photographs from sketchbook compiled by Joseph Hall (1839–1899) of Parkgate, Waverton: Cumbria Archive Centre, Carlisle, DX 1065/50
- Aqua-tints and engravings from Thomas West's "A Guide to the Lakes in Cumberland, Westmorland and Lancashire", 6th edn, 1796
- Aqua-tints and engravings from Thomas West's "A Guide to the Lakes in Cumberland, Westmorland and Lancashire", 6th edn, 1796
- Illustrations by A Reginald Smith from W G Collingwood 'The Lake Counties', (New Edition 1932)
- Old Maps of Cumbria Gallery: extracts of old printed maps showing Cumbria. All the maps illustrated are in private ownership and there are no copyright restrictions on their use
- Engravings from Thomas Pennant's Tour from Downing to Alston Moor 1801

Ortelius Cumbria Map

== Project Direction ==
All the work on the Victoria County History of Cumbria project is being done by volunteers, under the overall direction of Dr Fiona Edmonds Director of the Regional Heritage Centre at Lancaster University and with volunteer guidance and support provided by Dr Sarah Rose, assistant editor.

Volunteers are provided training to ensure that the high standards of scholarship expected from the Victoria County History are maintained, and that the output, both Digests and Draft Histories, provides a factual, reliable and authoritative work of reference for everyone with an interest in the history of their town or village – and possibly their family too.

A practical guide for volunteers contributing to the Victoria County History (Cumbria) Project has been published and is freely available. It contains guidance on all aspects of researching and writing the history of a parish or township for the VCH, drawing attention to sources and themes of particular relevance to the history of local communities in Cumbria.

== Trustees ==
The Cumbria County History Trust (CCHT) is a registered charity (Charity Registration Number 1137379). The charitable aims of the Trust are:

1. to further the education of the public in the history and heritage of the County of Cumbria and its communities and to promote and foster public knowledge, understanding and appreciation of the history of the area in general.
2. to undertake research into the history and heritage of the County of Cumbria and its communities and to disseminate the useful results of such research for the public benefit.

The project is managed by the Board of Trustees, chaired by Sir Roland Jackson.

The other trustees (as at September 2023) are:

- Richard Platt [Treasurer]
- Lorna Mullett [ Secretary]
- Penelope Bradshaw [University of Cumbria]
- Robert Baxter [Cumbria Unitary Authorities]
- William Shannon [CWAAS]
- Eleanor Kingston [Lake District National Park Authority]
- Keith Stringer [University of Lancaster]
- Roger Bingham
- Rob David
- Marion McClintock
- Jane Penman
- Angus Winchester

== Patrons and Sponsors ==
This project is part financed by the Cumberland & Westmorland Antiquarian & Archaeological Society

The Trusts Patrons are:

- Sir Christian Bonington CBE
- Sir James Cropper KCVO
- Lord Inglewood

The Trust is supported by the following organisations:

- Cumbria County Council
- Cumbria Local History Federation
- Cumberland & Westmorland Antiquarian & Archaeological Society
- Diocese of Carlisle
- Friends of Cumbria Archives
- Lake District National Park Authority
- National Trust North West Region
- Society of Antiquaries of Newcastle upon Tyne
- Rural Development Programme for England (RDPE)
- University of Cumbria
- University of Lancaster
