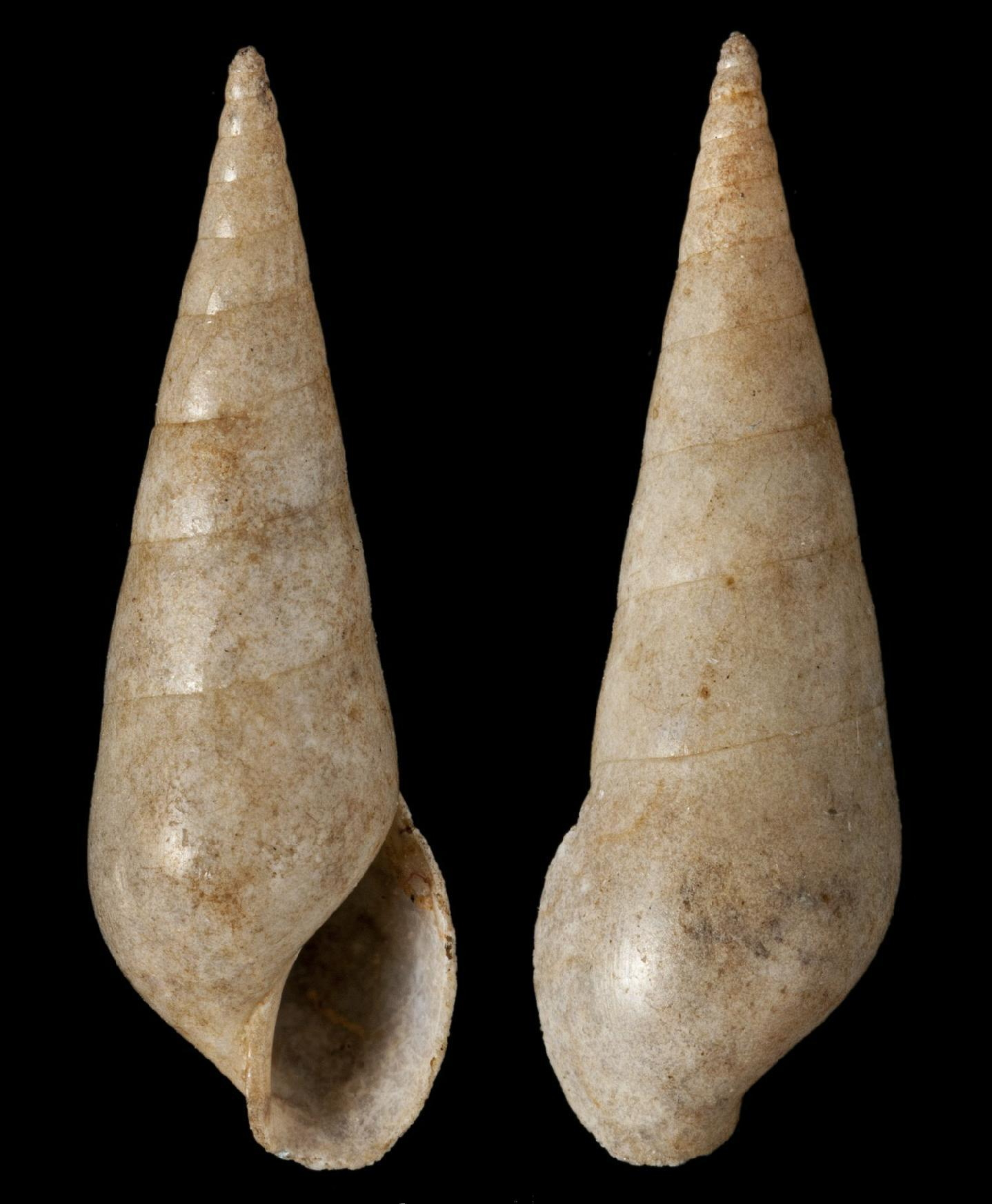
- Shell of Melanella hians (syntype at the Natural History Museum, London)

Scientific classification
- Kingdom: Animalia
- Phylum: Mollusca
- Class: Gastropoda
- Subclass: Caenogastropoda
- Order: Littorinimorpha
- Family: Eulimidae
- Genus: Melanella
- Species: M. hians

Binomial name
- Melanella hians Watson, 1883

Synonyms
- Eulima hians R. B. Watson, 1883 superseded combination

= Melanella hians =

Species of gastropod

Melanella hians is a species of sea snail, a marine gastropod mollusk in the family Eulimidae. The species is one of many species known to exist within the genus, Melanella

== Description ==
The length of the shell attains 3.8 mm, its diameter 1.88 mm.

(Original description) The rather large shell is somewhat broad, with a slightly coarse, linear suture. It has short, flat-sided whorls, a rounded and somewhat constricted base, a large, widely open aperture, and a small apex.

The shell is dirty white, although the specimen is dead and may have lost its original colour.

The sculpture consists of exceedingly faint microscopic growth lines. On either side of the whorls, numerous irregular, discontinuous, and non-corresponding scars mark the positions of former apertural margins. The apex is small and contracts rather abruptly; at its centre, the extreme tip becomes visible. The spire is high and slightly flexuous, with the profile lines on either side not quite symmetrical.

The shell comprises eleven whorls, which are only perceptibly convex. The earlier whorls are rounded, whereas the body whorl is rather large and slightly tumid. It is very faintly angulated at the periphery and has a rounded base, from which the spoon-shaped anterior portion of the aperture projects. The suture is linear, slightly impressed, and somewhat coarse for the genus.

The aperture is large, widely open, and narrowly oval in outline. The outer lip is strongly arched and widely expanded; its margin is deeply sinuate above, projects slightly in the middle, and recedes somewhat towards the base, where it expands into a very shallow, broad siphonal canal with a spoon-shaped edge. The inner lip consists of a rather thin, narrow glaze with a sharply defined margin. This glaze crosses the body whorl and extends along the broad, straight columella. Behind the reflected columellar margin lies a deep, strongly marked furrow.

== Distribution ==
This marine species occurs off Culebra Island, Puerto Rico.
