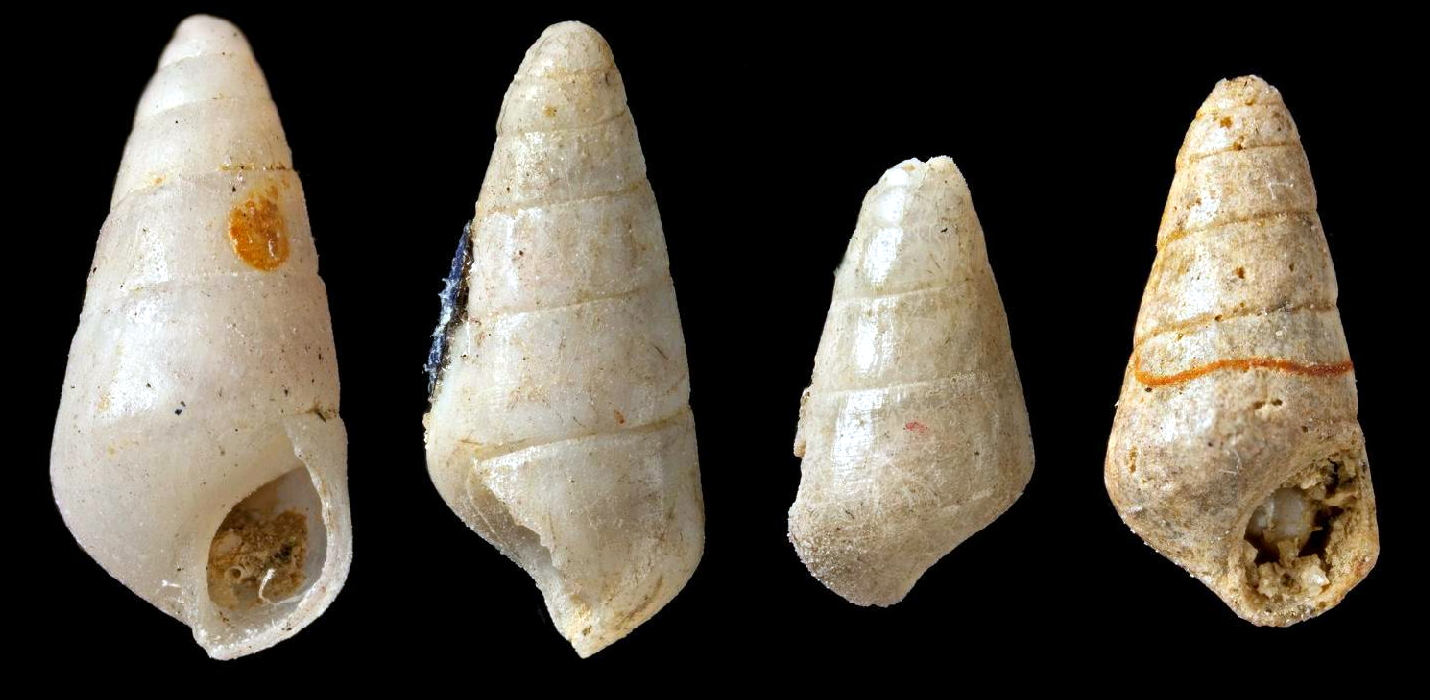
- Shell of Melanella hebes (syntype at the Natural History Museum, London)

Scientific classification
- Kingdom: Animalia
- Phylum: Mollusca
- Class: Gastropoda
- Subclass: Caenogastropoda
- Order: Littorinimorpha
- Family: Eulimidae
- Genus: Melanella
- Species: M. hebes

Binomial name
- Melanella hebes Watson, 1883

Synonyms
- Eulima hebes R. B. Watson, 1883 superseded combination

= Melanella hebes =

Species of gastropod

Melanella hebes is a species of sea snail, a marine gastropod mollusk in the family Eulimidae. The species is one of many species known to exist within the genus, Melanella

== Description ==
The length of the shell attains 3.8 mm, its diameter 1.88 mm.

(Original description) The rather small shell is broad, and blunt, slightly angulated at the periphery and straight. It has conical profiles, flat-sided whorls, a slightly impressed suture, and a small, angulated aperture. Its sculpture consists of unequal, close-set, hair-like microscopic lines of growth, together with faint, broader spirals.

The shell is a glossy ivory-white.

The apex is very blunt and rounded, with a slight projection of the extreme tip to one side, and the spire is short and conical, very slightly contracted toward the apex. There are 6 whorls, of regular increase, of which the body whorl is subangulated at the periphery. The suture is somewhat oblique, slightly impressed, and distinct. The aperture is somewhat lozenge-shaped, being pointed above and at the end of the columella, as well as at the periphery of the shell and at the base of the columella. The outer lip is thin, its edge angulated; it retreats above and in front, and is prominent at the periphery. The inner lip forms a thinnish, defined pad that stretches across the body; this pad is flat and expands thinly onto the straight, shortish columella.

== Distribution ==
This marine species occurs off Pernambuco, Brazil.
