= Turbonilla scalpidens =

Scientific classification
- Kingdom: Animalia
- Phylum: Mollusca
- Class: Gastropoda
- Family: Pyramidellidae
- Genus: Turbonilla
- Species: T. scalpidens

Binomial name
- Turbonilla scalpidens Watson, 1886

Species of gastropod

Turbonilla scalpidens is a species of sea snail, a marine gastropod mollusk in the family Pyramidellidae, the pyrams and their allies.

== Distribution ==
This species occurs in the following locations:

- Madagascar
