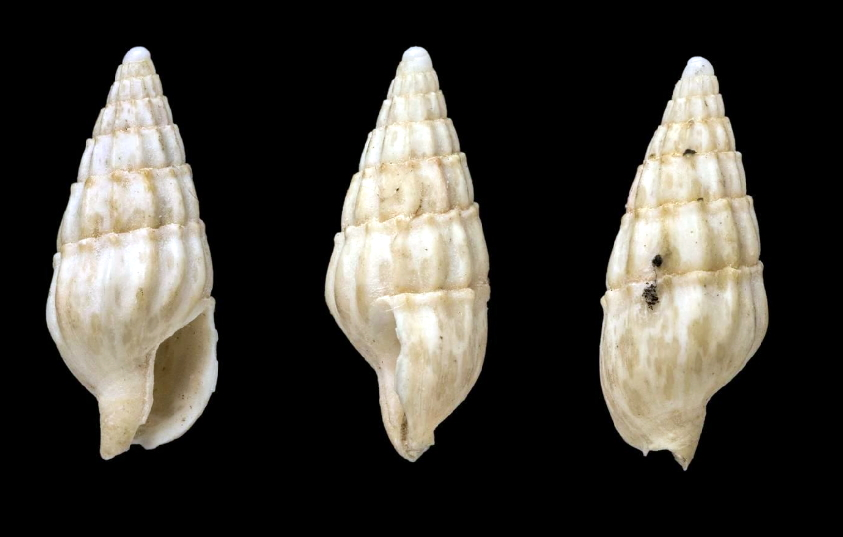
- Shell of Anachis strix (specimen at the Natural History Museum, London)

Scientific classification
- Kingdom: Animalia
- Phylum: Mollusca
- Class: Gastropoda
- Subclass: Caenogastropoda
- Order: Neogastropoda
- Family: Columbellidae
- Genus: Anachis
- Species: A. strix

Binomial name
- Anachis strix (R. B. Watson, 1882)

Synonyms
- Columbella (Pyrene) strix R. B. Watson, 1882 superseded combination; Columbella (Pyrene) strix var. subacta R. B. Watson, 1882 junior subjective synonym; Columbella strix R. B. Watson, 1882 superseded combination; Columbella strix var. subacta R. B. Watson, 1882 junior subjective synonym

= Anachis strix =

Species of gastropod

Anachis strix is a species of sea snail in the family Columbellidae, the dove snails.

== Description ==
The length of the shell attains 4.5 mm, its diameter 2¼ mm.

(Original description) The shell is rather small, short, and dumpy, featuring a high, blunt spire and a small body whorl. It possesses a very contracted base, from which a small, slightly reverted aperture projects. The whorls are longitudinally chamfered and display a small beaded thread around the top.

Sculpture: Longitudinals: On each whorl, there are about 13 straight, narrow, ridge-like, but low riblets. These are separated by shallow furrows, two to three times their breadth. These ribs and furrows run quite continuously down the spire, exhibiting a slight sinistral twist. Toward the aperture and on the base, they become feeble but are faintly traceable on the snout. The whole surface is finely scored with lines of growth.

Spirals: The suture is inferiorly margined by a slight thread, which rises into small beads when crossing the riblets. In the longitudinal furrows, a faint tendency to spiral scratches is visible, which, on the base, arrange themselves into narrow and very superficial furrows with broadish, flat threads between. These become stronger and narrower on the base of the aperture but are feebler again towards its front.

The shell is glossy porcellaneous white. The spire is rather high, narrow, and conical. The apex is a small, round dome of two glossy embryonic whorls, of which the extreme tip is both immersed and flattened down with scarcely any suture.

There are 8 whorls in all, which are conical with straight sides, short, and broad. At the top, each projects very shortly and horizontally. The body whorl is small, with a rapidly contracted base, from which the small, slightly reverted aperture projects. The suture is very little impressed but strongly marked by the projection of the whorl below it.

The aperture is small, rather rhomboidal, pointed above, and produced below into a short, open, squarish canal. The outer lip is very straight to the corner of the base, from which it is patulous and curved. In the middle, one small, round tubercle projects a little way below the suture. The edge is drawn back so as to form a very slight, open, false sinus.

Inner Lip: There is a thin glaze on the body, the line across which is very straight, as is also the line down the columella, where the glaze (without teeth) forms a thickish, prominent border. This border is early cut off the sharp, oblique, twisted edge of the columella in front. The columella itself is short and straight, with a slightly bent-over point.

== Distribution ==
This marine species occurs in the Caribbean Sea off U.S. Virgin Islands and Anguilla; also off French Guiana and Brazil.
