= Odostomia hyphala =

Scientific classification
- Kingdom: Animalia
- Phylum: Mollusca
- Class: Gastropoda
- Family: Pyramidellidae
- Genus: Odostomia
- Species: O. hyphala

Binomial name
- Odostomia hyphala Watson, 1886

Species of gastropod

Odostomia hyphala is a species of sea snail, a marine gastropod mollusk in the family Pyramidellidae, the pyrams and their allies.
