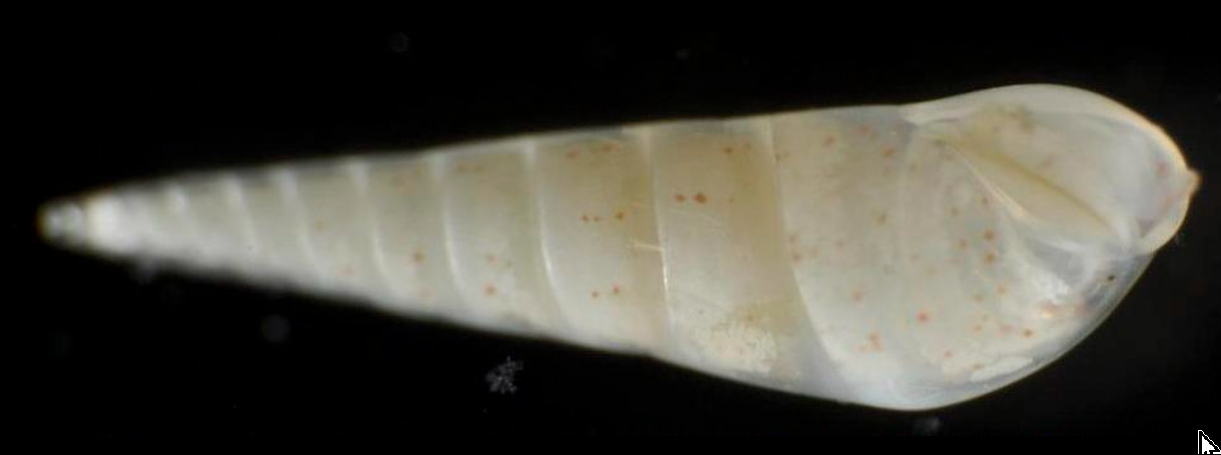
- Shell of Melanella oxytata (specimen at the Smithsonian Institution)

Scientific classification
- Kingdom: Animalia
- Phylum: Mollusca
- Class: Gastropoda
- Subclass: Caenogastropoda
- Order: Littorinimorpha
- Family: Eulimidae
- Genus: Melanella
- Species: M. oxytata

Binomial name
- Melanella oxytata Watson, 1883

Synonyms
- Eulima oxytata R. B. Watson, 1883 superseded combination

= Melanella oxytata =

Species of gastropod

Melanella oxytata is a species of sea snail, a marine gastropod mollusk in the family Eulimidae. The species is one of many species known to exist within the genus, Melanella

== Description ==
The length of the shell attains 7.62 mm, its diameter 1.8 mm.

(Original description) The high and narrow shell is slightly bent, very thin, and transparent. It has a very fine, linear suture that is scarcely visible and appears somewhat marginated, owing to the septa of the whorls showing through the delicate shell. The whorls are slightly oblique and perfectly flat-sided, while the base is very rounded. The aperture is short and rounded, and the apex is exceedingly small, attenuated, and sharply pointed.

The shell bears no distinct sculpture, although occasional microscopic lines of growth can be detected. Its colour varies from a horny translucence to almost complete transparency and a clear, translucent white. The apex is extremely small, attenuated, and sharp, with an acuminately rounded form that is almost symmetrical. The spire is very high and narrow, though not quite straight, as it bends more or less distinctly toward the tip.

There are seventeen whorls, each very short and perfectly flat-sided. The body whorl is comparatively short and only very slightly tumid, terminating below in a gentle, regular curve that forms the rounded base. The suture is only slightly oblique and appears as a fine, almost linear groove. It is scarcely visible on the surface, and, because the septum of each whorl shines through the thin shell, it gives the misleading impression of being remotely marginated.

In the young shell, the aperture is pear-shaped, whereas in the adult it becomes somewhat irregularly semicircular. The outer lip forms a very regular arch, except toward the lower outer corner, where it develops a blunt angulation. Above, its edge is shallowly and broadly sinuated; it then becomes prominent in the middle before retreating toward the front into a shallow, open, unequal-sided gutter.

The inner lip lies very flat against the body of the shell. At the junction of the body and the columella there is a very slight angulation. The columella itself is oblique, very short, and remarkably narrow, ending in a patulous, but not recurved, edge.

== Distribution ==
This marine species occurs off the Philippines and the Society Islands.
