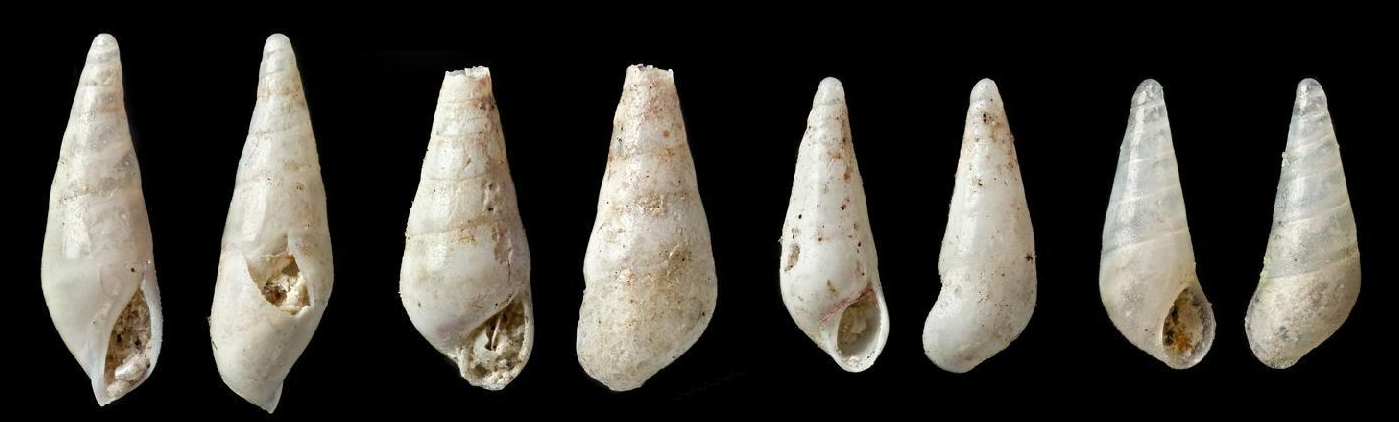
- Shells of Melanella fasciata(syntype at Natural History Museum, London)

Scientific classification
- Kingdom: Animalia
- Phylum: Mollusca
- Class: Gastropoda
- Subclass: Caenogastropoda
- Order: Littorinimorpha
- Family: Eulimidae
- Genus: Melanella
- Species: M. fasciata

Binomial name
- Melanella fasciata (Watson, 1883)

Synonyms
- Cuspeulima fasciata (R. B. Watson, 1883) superseded combination; Eulima fasciata R. B. Watson, 1883 superseded combination

= Melanella fasciata =

Species of gastropod

Melanella fasciata is a species of sea snail, a marine gastropod mollusk in the family Eulimidae. The species is one of a number within the genus Melanella.

== Description ==
The length of the shell attains 2.54 mm; its diameter 0.51 mm.

(Original description) The shell is very small, slightly bent, and short. The suture is discernible on the surface and is faintly banded above with white. The base is rounded, the aperture is pointedly oval, and the tip is small and rounded. There is no sculpture. The colour is translucent, with an ivory band encircling the body whorl at the periphery and lying above the suture on the spire.

The apex is small and perfectly rounded. The spire is rather attenuated and bent. There are nine whorls; they are flat, and the body whorl is rather long, with a produced, rounded base. The suture is oblique and slightly impressed, especially near the apex. The mouth is rather large and oval, pointed above. The outer lip is a little prominently arched; on its front edge it is rather deeply sinuated above, prominent in the middle, and retreating at the base so as to form a broad, shallow, little siphonal canal in front. The inner lip is a very narrow, rather thin glaze with a defined edge; it crosses the body and runs straight down the columella, which is very narrow and patulous, with a sharp prominent edge and a very minute furrow behind it.

== Distribution ==
This marine species occurs off Culebra Island, Puerto Rico.
