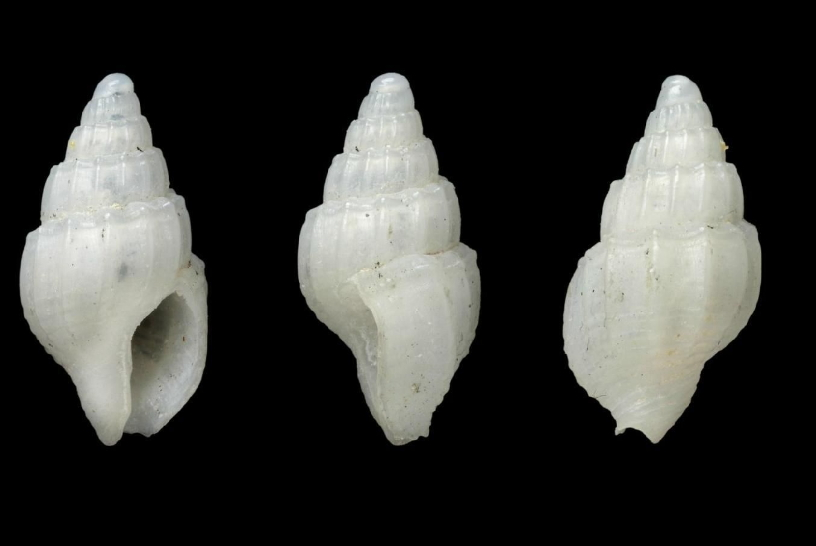
- Shell of Anachis stricta (specimen at the Natural History Museum, London)

Scientific classification
- Kingdom: Animalia
- Phylum: Mollusca
- Class: Gastropoda
- Subclass: Caenogastropoda
- Order: Neogastropoda
- Family: Columbellidae
- Genus: Anachis
- Species: A. stricta

Binomial name
- Anachis stricta (R. B. Watson, 1882)

Synonyms
- Columbella (Pyrene) stricta R. B. Watson, 1882 superseded combination; Columbella stricta R. B. Watson, 1882 superseded combination

= Anachis stricta =

Species of gastropod

Anachis stricta is a species of sea snail in the family Columbellidae, the dove snails.

== Description ==
The length of the shell attains 4.5 mm, its diameter 2¼ mm.

(Original description) Shell: The shell is small, short, and dumpy, featuring a rather high, scalar, blunt spire, a short but broadish body whorl, a very contracted base, and a small, slightly reverted aperture. The whorls are longitudinally chamfered, possess a small keel around the top, and display rather broad spiral threads.

Sculpture. Longitudinals: On the body whorl, there are about 12 low, ridge-shaped, straight ribs. These are not continuous from whorl to whorl but increase rapidly in number up the spire. They are parted by furrows about three times their width. The last rib, which is remote from the edge of the lip, is varicose. All longitudinal ribs become obsolete towards the point of the base. Spirals: Below the suture are two well-marked furrows that are interrupted by the ribs and parted by a strongish thread. This thread forms a keel and rises on the ribs into little tubercles. Below this, the whorls are more or less obsoletely scored by broad, flat threads. These threads on the base and pillar are very distinct, though narrow, and are parted by broad, shallow, square-cut furrows.

Colour: The shell is smooth, porcellaneous white.

Spire. The spire is rather high, scalar, and conical. The apex is a blunt, round, smooth, glossy dome of 1.5 embryonic whorls, whose tip is both immersed and flattened down, with a scarcely perceptible suture.

Whorls: There are 6 whorls, which are cylindrical, scarcely convex, angulated, and flatly shouldered at the top. The last whorl is short, slightly tumid, with a rapidly contracted base, from which projects the short, broad, conical, abruptly truncated snout. The suture is angular and well marked by the projection of the shoulder below it.

Aperture: The aperture is small, short, but broadish, angulated above, and obliquely prolonged below into the square, open, slightly reverted canal. The outer lip is contracted and very slightly curved above, very patulous where the bend comes, and below this, it is direct and oblique. It has about 10 small denticles within, of which the highest is remote from the top and is larger than the others. Just at this point is a slight, open, false sinus.

Inner Lip: There is a thin glaze on the body, the line across which is very straight, as is also the line down the columella where the glaze forms a projecting border (without teeth), which runs out sharp and narrow to the very point. The point of the pillar is very obliquely cut off with a twist; the pillar itself is short, strong, and conical.

== Distribution ==
This marine species occurs in the Caribbean Sea off Puerto Rico and the U.S. Virgin Islands.
