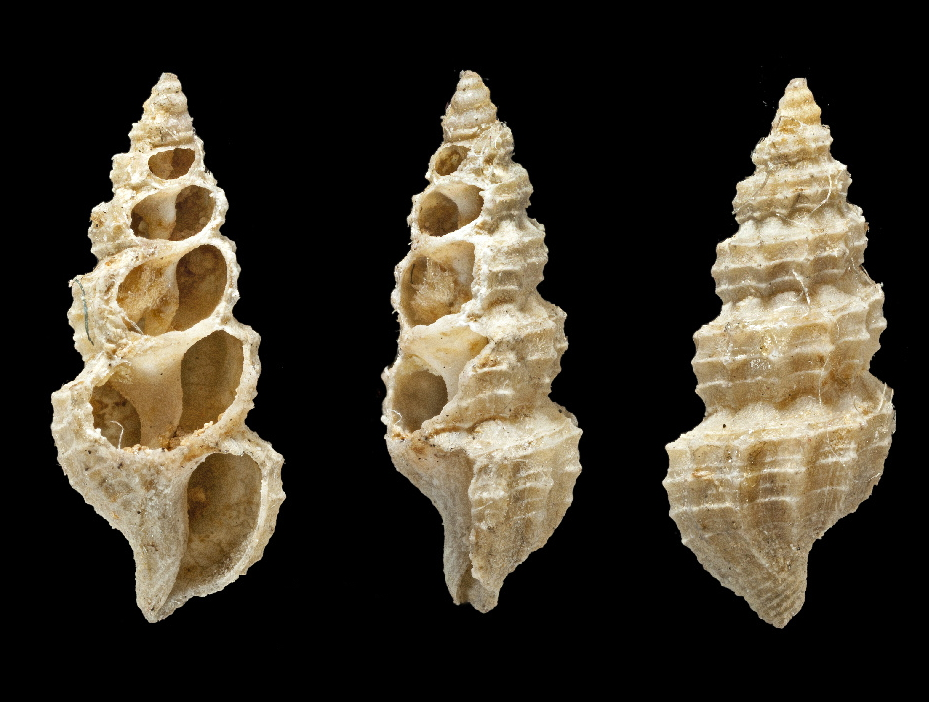
- Shell of Philbertia perparva (specimen at the Natural History Museum, London)

Scientific classification
- Kingdom: Animalia
- Phylum: Mollusca
- Class: Gastropoda
- Subclass: Caenogastropoda
- Order: Neogastropoda
- Superfamily: Conoidea
- Family: Raphitomidae
- Genus: Philbertia
- Species: P. perparva

Binomial name
- Philbertia perparva (Watson, 1881)

Synonyms
- Pleurotoma (Defrancia) perparva Watson, 1881

= Philbertia perparva =

Species of gastropod

Philbertia perparva is a species of sea snail, a marine gastropod mollusk in the family Raphitomidae. It occurs in the Western Atlantic.

== Description ==
The length of the shell attains 5.8 mm.

== Distribution ==
This marine species occurs off Northeast Brazil.
