= ARC Centre of Excellence for the History of Emotions =

Australian research centre

Australian Research Council Centre of Excellence for the History of Emotions
- Established: 2011; 15 years ago
- Mission: Research in the history of emotions
- Director: Kirk Essary (since 2019)
- Faculty: Faculty of Arts, Business, Law and Education, University of Western Australia
- Location: M204, 35 Stirling Highway, University of Western Australia, Perth, Western Australia, Australia

The ARC Centre of Excellence for the History of Emotions (CHE) is an Australian research centre that undertakes research in the history of emotions. The Centre was established in 2011 with core funding from the Australian Research Council (ARC), the Australian Government's main agency for allocating research funding to academics and researchers in Australian universities. The Centre of Excellence for the History of Emotions uses historical knowledge from medieval and early modern Europe to understand how societies have understood, experienced, expressed and performed emotions in pre-modern Europe, and how this long history impacts on contemporary Australia.

== Organisational structure ==
The Centre's headquarters are based at the University of Western Australia in Perth, Western Australia, Australia, with other nodes around Australia at the universities of Adelaide, Melbourne, New England, Queensland, and Sydney, at the Australian Catholic University, Macquarie University and Western Sydney University. The Centre has four programs: Meanings, Change, Performance, and Shaping the Modern. Its membership includes fourteen chief investigators, over 38 full-time postdoctoral fellows, 37 postgraduate students and more than 100 associate investigators at universities around Australia.

The Centre has ten international partner investigators from major institutions in the UK, Europe and Canada: Queen Mary University of London, the University of Southampton and Durham University, Newcastle University and the University of Bristol (England); Freie Universität Berlin (Germany), Université de Fribourg (Switzerland) and Umeå University (Sweden); Université du Québec à Montréal and Western University (Canada). The Centre also has formal links with the Arizona Center for Medieval and Renaissance Studies (USA) and the University of York (England). CHE hosted over 50 international academic visitors on short-term fellowship schemes, and attracted (and continues to attract) many more to its conferences and collaboratories each year, from postgraduates to professors, and the CHE collaborated on major international events in Germany, Italy, UK, China, South Africa, America and Canada.

The Centre was awarded A$24 million in Australian Government funding for the period 2011 to 2018, at the time the largest funding award to the humanities in Australian history. From 2018 it has continued with funding from its node universities.

The Society for the History of Emotions (SHE), described as "an international professional association for scholars interested in emotions as historically and culturally situated phenomena", publishes the journal Emotions: History, Culture, Society.

== People ==
=== Directors ===
The following individuals have served as directors of the Centre:

Ordinal	Officeholder	Title	Term start	Term end	Time in office
1	Philippa Maddern	Foundation Director and Chief Investigator	2011	2014	2–3 years
2	Andrew Lynch	Director and Chief Investigator	2014	2018	3–4 years
3	Susan Broomhall	Director and Chief Investigator	2018	2018	0 years
4	Kirk Essary	Director and Chief Investigator	2019	incumbent	6–7 years
