= Calliostoma stephanephorum =

Scientific classification
- Kingdom: Animalia
- Phylum: Mollusca
- Class: Gastropoda
- Subclass: Vetigastropoda
- Order: Trochida
- Family: Calliostomatidae
- Genus: Calliostoma
- Species: C. stephanephorum

Binomial name
- Calliostoma stephanephorum (R. B. Watson, 1886)

Synonyms
- Calliostoma (Kombologian) toshiharui Kosuge, 1997; Calliostoma toshiharui Kosuge, 1997; Trochus (Ziziphinus) stephanephorus R. B. Watson, 1886; Trochus stephanephorus R. B. Watson, 1886

Species of gastropod

Calliostoma stephanephorum is a species of sea snail, a marine gastropod mollusk in the family Calliostomatidae. The size of the shell varies between 13 mm and 55 mm. This marine species occurs off the Philippines and Borneo.
