= Frank Watson Book Prize =

The Frank Watson Book Prize is an international, biennial academic book award, grant "for the best monograph, edited collection and/or book-length original work on Scottish History published in the previous two years." It has been awarded since 1993, It is awarded by a panel of experts organised by the entre for Scottish Studies at the University of Guelph, Ontario, Canada. and comes with an invitation to deliver a plenary lecture.

== List of winners ==
Frank Watson Book Prize winners
Year	Author	Title	Publisher	Publication year	Notes
1993	David Allen	Virtue, Learning and the Scottish Enlightenment: Ideas of Scholarship in Early Modern History	Edinburgh University Press	1993	
1995	Carol Eddington	Court and Culture in Renaissance Scotland: Sir David Lindsay of the Mount	University of Massachusetts Press	1994	
1997	Allan I. Macinnes	Clanship, Commerce, and the House of Stuart, 1603-1788	Tuckwell Press	1996	
1999	Callum G. Brown	Up-helly-aa: Custom, Culture and Community in Shetland	Manchester University Press	1998	
2001	Keith Brown	Noble Society in Scotland: Wealth, Family, and Culture from the Reformation to the Revolution	Edinburgh University Press	2000	
2003	Richard Rodger	The Transformation of Edinburgh: Land, Property and Trust in the Nineteenth Century	Cambridge University Press	2001	
2005	David Stevenson	The Hunt for Rob Roy: The Man and the Myths	John Donald/Birlinn	2004	
2007	Richard B. Sher	The Enlightenment & the Book: Scottish Authors and Their Publishers in Eighteenth-Century Britain, Ireland, & America	University of Chicago Press,	2006	
2009	John J. McGavin	Theatricality and Narrative in Medieval and Early Modern Scotland	Ashgate	2007	
2011	Diarmid A. Finnegan	Natural History Societies and Civic Culture in Victorian Scotland	Pickering and Chatto Press	2009	
2013	Marjory Harper	Scotland No More? The Scots who Left Scotland in the 20th Century	Luath Press	2012	
2015	Allan Kennedy	Governing Gaeldom: The Scottish Highlands and the Restoration State, 1660-1688	Brill	2014	
2017	David G. Barrie and Susan Brommhall	Police Courts in Nineteenth-Century Scotland	Ashgate	2015	
2019	Tim Shannon	Indian Captive, Indian King: Peter Williamson in America and Britain	Harvard University Press	2018	
2021	Fiona Edmonds	Gaelic Influence in the Northumbrian Kingdom: The Golden Age and the Viking Age	Boydell	2019	
2023	Neil McGuigan	Máél Coluim III, 'Canmore': An Eleventh-Century Scottish King	John Donald / Birliin	2021	
2025	Catriona M. M. MacDonald	The Caledoniad: The Making of Scottish History	John Donald / Birliin	2024	
