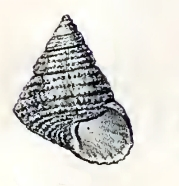
- Phanerolepida transenna

Scientific classification
- Kingdom: Animalia
- Phylum: Mollusca
- Class: Gastropoda
- Subclass: Vetigastropoda
- Order: Trochida
- Superfamily: Trochoidea
- Family: Turbinidae
- Genus: Phanerolepida; Dall, 1907

Synonyms
- Leptothyra (Phanerolepida) Dall, 1907

= Phanerolepida =

Genus of gastropods

Phanerolepida is a genus of sea snails, marine gastropod mollusks in the family Turbinidae, the turban snails.

== Species ==
Species within the genus Phanerolepida include:

- † Phanerolepida expansilabrum Kuroda, 1931
- † Phanerolepida rehderi MacNeil, 1960
- † Phanerolepida oregonensis Hickman, 1972
- Phanerolepida transenna (Watson, 1879)
