= Cliff Hague =

British urban planner

Cliff Hague (born 1944) is a British town planning practitioner and Emeritus Professor of Planning and Spatial Development at Heriot-Watt University, Edinburgh. He was educated at Alfred St Elementary School in Manchester, North Manchester Grammar School for Boys (1955–1963) and Magdalene College Cambridge (1963–1966) where he read geography, then at the University of Manchester (1966–1968) where he was awarded a post-graduate Diploma in Town Planning.

== Biography ==
Through the 1970s Hague provided voluntary assistance on planning and housing to the Craigmillar Festival Society, a community group in Edinburgh's largest public housing estate. From the mid-1970s until the late 1980s he was part of the Radical Institute Group that sought reform within the Royal Town Planning Institute. As well as teaching planning and housing at Heriot-Watt University, he also worked as a part-time tutor for the Open University on social science courses during the 1970s and 1980s.

Since 2006, he has been emeritus professor, freelance consultant and researcher. From 2011 until 2014, he was Chairman of the Built Environment Forum Scotland. He was one of the senior planning academics invited to take part in the Encounters in Planning Thought project at the Technical University of Vienna. In Riga in 2013, he gave one of the six Association of European Schools of Planning/International Federation of Housing and Planning anniversary lectures.

He served as president of the Commonwealth Association of Planners from 2000 to 2006, and as secretary-general from 2006 to 2010. From 2008 until 2015 he led the team at the Royal Town Planning Institute that provided the UK Contact Point for the ESPON programme (ESPON is the European Network for Territorial Development and Cohesion). In 2011 he chaired the Commonwealth expert group on urbanisation. He was president of the Royal Town Planning Institute in 1996.

He is a member of the UK's Academy for the Social Sciences. He is a Patron of PAS. From 2016 until 2023 he was Chair of the Cockburn Association, which is Edinburgh's Civic Trust. He was awarded the O.B.E. in the 2016 Birthday Honours.

== Work ==
Hague has written a number of books and articles, including The Development of Planning Thought: A Critical Perspect which was published by Hutchinson in 1984; Place Identity, Participation and Planning (co-edited with Paul Jenkins) and Making Planning Work: A Guide to Approaches and Skills (co-authored with Pat Wakely, Chris Jasko and Julie Crespin).

He co-authored Urban Challenges: Scoping the State of the Commonwealth's Cities with Will French in 2009. In 2010 he co-authored the First ESPON 2013 Synthesis Report, New Evidence on Smart, Sustainable and Inclusive Territories. His website cliffhague.com carries blogs that he writes and links to his work. He is also 'CliffHague on Twitter.

Regional and Local Economic Development co-authored with Euan Hague and Carrie Breitbach, was published by Palgrave in 2011. His book "Leading Change: Delivering the New Urban Agenda Through Urban and Territorial Planning" for which he was lead author.

In 2021 his book Programmes! Programmes! Football and Life from Wartime to Lockdown was published by Pitch Publishing.

His latest book is Planning, Sustainable Urbanisation and The Commonwealth: The Commonwealth Association of Planners, Past, Present and Future, published by Routledge in 2023.

He writes a monthly "Comment" blog for Planning Resource.

In 2015 he led an International Advisory Board of experienced planners that reviewed planning in Area C of the West Bank of Palestine for UN-Habitat, and reported on it.

From 2018 to 2022 he was one of the judges for the Commonwealth Association of Planners Awards for Outstanding Planning Achievement in the Commonwealth.

As Chair of the Cockburn Association he often commented on development issues in Edinburgh.

== Publications ==
- C. Hague, P. Wakely, J. Crespin and C. Jasko, 2006, "Making Planning Work: A Guide to Approaches and Skills", Earthscan.
- C. Hague, 2007, "Urban containment: European experience of planning for the compact city" in G-J Knaap, H.A. Haccou, K.J.Clifton and J.W.Frece (eds) "Incentives, Regulations and Plans: The Role of States and Nation-states in Smart Growth Planning", Edward Elgar, Northampton, Mass and Cheltenham, UK.
- C. Hague, 2008, “Pour des villes harmonieuses? Enjeux, défis et réponses de l’urbanisme, de Vancouver à Nanjing” in N. Buchoud (ed.), 2008, La Ville Stratégique, Lyons: CERTU, Ministère de l’Ecologie, de l’Energie, du Développement durable et de l’Aménagement du territoire, 209–215.
- C. Hague and V. Hachmann, 2008, "Organization, Achievements and the Future of ESPON" in A.Faludi (ed) "European Spatial Planning and Research", Lincoln Institute of Land Policy, Cambridge, Mass.
- C. Hague, 2009, "Viewpoint: Planning in the Commonwealth" Town Planning Review 80(2).
- C. Hague. E. Hague and C. Breitbach (2011) "Regional and Local Economic Development", Palgrave Macmillan, Basingstoke and New York.
- C. Hague, 2013, "Can planners assess Territorial Impacts?" in J.Teixeira (ed.), (2013), A Centenary of Spatial Planning in Europe, Brussels: European Council of Spatial Planners / Outre Terre,105–109.
- C. Hague, 2015, "Rapid urbanisation, health and well-being: How informal settlements, slums and sprawling suburbs are globalising health problems” in H.Barton, S.Thompson, S.Burgess and M.Grant, (eds), (2015), The Routledge Handbook of Planning for Health and Well-Being: Shaping a Sustainable and Healthy Future, London and New York; Routledge, 48 -60.
- C. Hague, 2015, "Community Involvement in Valuing and Managing Sites and Monuments: Barriers and Lessons from Current Practices” in K.van Balen and A.Vandesande (eds.), 2015, Community Involvement in Heritage, Antwerp: Garant, pp. 67–77.
- C. Hague, 2015, "International experts call for fundamental changes in Israel's approach to planning and development in Area C", This Week in Palestine, Nov.2015, Issue 210.5.
- C.Hague, 2016, "Planning Practice in the West Bank: Should Planners Speak Up?" Planning Theory and Practice,17(1), 161–165.
- C.Hague, 2017, "Cliff Hague — Europe's Spatial Challenges." disP - The Planning Review, 53(2),68–69.
- C.Hague, with P.Taylor and C.Platt, 2018, "Leading Change: Delivering the New Urban Agenda Through Urban and Territorial Planning", Kuala Lumpur, UN_Habitat.
- C.Hague, 2018, "Delivering the New Urban Agenda through Urban and Territorial Planning", Planning Theory and Practice, 19 (4), 618–622.
- Campaigning For Edinburgh: The Cockburn Association 1875-2049 (Birlinn, Edinburgh 2025) (with Richard Rodger) 246pp.
