= Elspeth Janet Boog Watson =

Scottish teacher, writer, and broadcaster

- Born: 15 May 1900
- Died: 28 June 1980 (aged 80)
- Occupations: Teacher, writer and broadcaster

Elspeth Jane Boog Watson sometimes Boog-Watson (15 May 1900 – 28 June 1980) was a teacher, writer and broadcaster.

== Early life and family ==
Born in Levenhall near Musselburgh on 15 May 1900 to Charles Boog Watson and his wife Jane Ballantine Nairn. Her father was a noted Scottish engineer and antiquarian, who wrote numerous works and left the sizable Boog Watson bequest to Edinburgh's libraries and her paternal aunt was children's author Helen Bannerman. Her paternal grandfather was Robert Boog Watson, noted Scottish malacologist and minister of the Free Church of Scotland.

Watson's parents lived in a relatively large home at 24 Garscube Terrace, Edinburgh. In 1919, her oldest brother Robert married Kate Winifred Lundie and in 1928 her other brother William married Vera Marie Svobodova in Prague. Both brothers were medical doctors, her brother Robert was also a squadron leader in the Royal Air Force who died suddenly in 1935.

== Career and later life ==
Watson published her first book in 1935, the first of several educational titles intended for secondary school children, co-authored with fellow Edinburgh writer Janet Isabel Carruthers. Her death notice in The Daily Mail records that she was head of the history department George Watson's Ladies College.

Throughout the 1930s and 1940s Watson delivered multiple radio lectures on Scottish and British history, language, music and European geography intended for school-age listeners. In November 1939 she delivered a programme on the BBC Home Service called “Ah! Freedom is a Noble Thing” – The Story of Scotland's fight for Independence.

In 1947 she is noted as serving as chairperson of the Edinburgh Trust for the University Education of Women. and she published booklet outlining the first 100 years of this organisation in 1967.

From 1966 to 1969 she served as member of the ruling council of the Cockburn Association, Edinburgh's influential conservation group.

Prior to moving into a Morningside nursing home Watson had lived most of her life in her parents’ former home at 24 Garscube Terrace. She died in the nursing home on the 28th June 1980 and was cremated at Mortonhall Crematorium the following week.

== Selected publications ==
- Boog-Watson, Elspeth J. and Carruthers, Janet Isabel Beyond the Sunset – A Book of Explorers (Oxford University Press, 1935)
- Boog-Watson, Elspeth J. The Story of Moses (Oxford University Press, 1936)
- Boog-Watson, Elspeth J. and Carruthers, Janet Isabel West of the Moon – A Book of Explorers (Oxford University Press, 1938)
- Synge, Margaret Bertha, Boog-Watson, Elspeth Janet and Carruthers, J. Isabel; A Book of Discovery. The history of the world's exploration, from earliest times to the finding of the South Pole (1939)
- Boog-Watson, Elspeth J. Stories of the Middle Ages (Edinburgh, 1940)
- Boog-Watson, Elspeth J. and Carruthers, Janet Isabel History through the Ages: Wall Pictures (London, 1947–1950)
- Boog-Watson, Elspeth J. and Carruthers, J. Isabel How People Lived (Oxford University Press, 1948)
- Boog-Watson, Elspeth J. and Carruthers, Janet Isabel History through the Ages. Teacher's Companion (London, 1949)
- Boog-Watson, Elspeth J. and Carruthers, Janet Isabel Country Life through the Ages (London, 1955)
- Boog-Watson, Elspeth J. and Carruthers, Janet Isabel Houses (London, 1958)
- Boog-Watson, Elspeth J. Elizabethan Sailor (Oxford University Press, 1962) ISBN 0198345453
- Boog-Watson, Elspeth J. and Carruthers, Janet Isabel An Eighteenth Century Highlander (London, 1965)
- Boog-Watson, Elspeth Janet A History of the Edinburgh Association for the University Education of Women 1867-1967
- Boog-Watson, Elspeth Janet The Ladies’ Caledonian Club 1908-1970 (The Edinburgh Club, c.1970)
