= Simon Gunn (historian) =

British historian (born 1954)

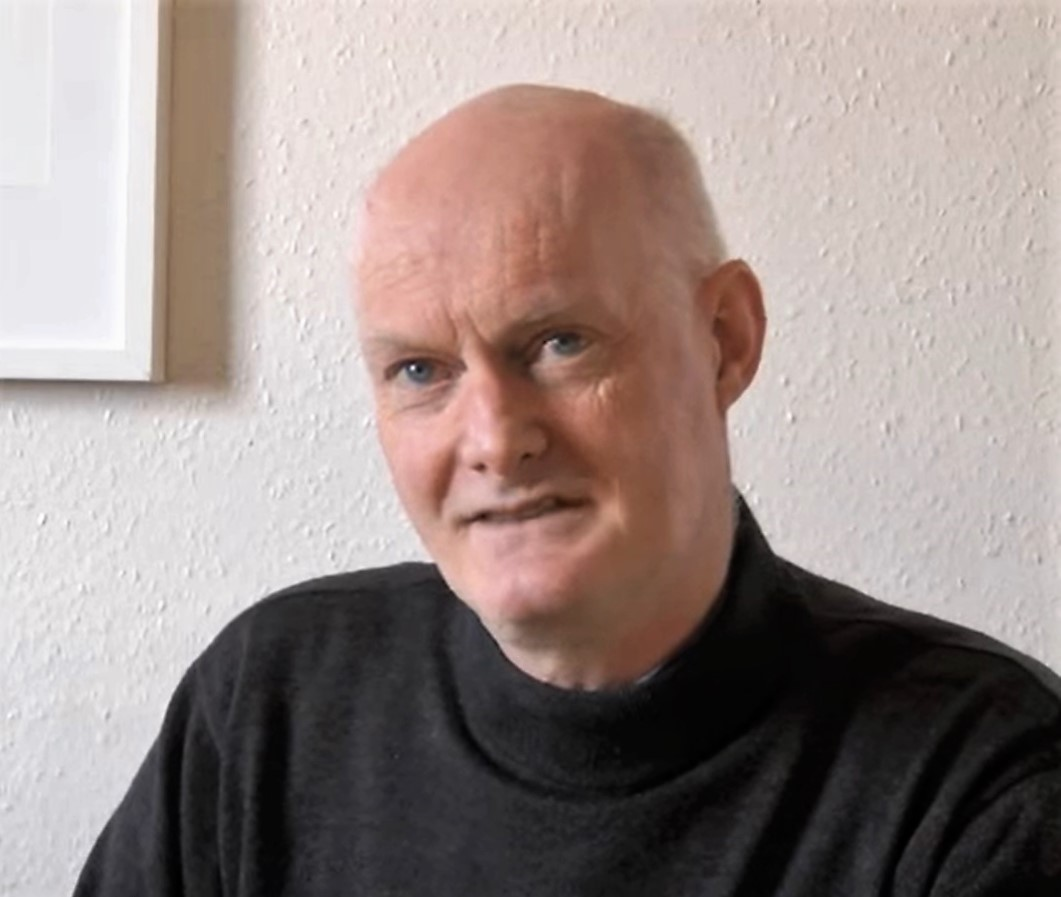
Gunn discusses his work on LearningInn in 2012

Simon Alexander Lindsay Gunn (born 1954) is a historian who was Professor of Urban History at the University of Leicester from 2006 to 2021.

== Career ==
Gunn completed his doctor of philosophy of degree (PhD) at the University of Manchester in 1992 for a thesis entitled Manchester middle class, 1850–1880. He was a fellow at the Institute of Historical Research, and the Transnational Institute in Amsterdam, before teaching at the Universities of Manchester, Essex and Leeds Metropolitan, where he was appointed a Reader in History. In 2006, he moved to the University of Leicester as a Professor of Urban History. As of 2017, he is co-editor of the journal Urban History. He retired from his professorship in 2021 and became an emeritus professor at Leicester.

== Research ==
In the past, Gunn's research has focused on the middle classes in modern Britain. More recently, he has focused on urban society in Britain since the 1960s, especially regarding the effect that material structures have on everyday life in British cities. His published works include:

=== Books ===
- (Edited with L. Faire), Research Methods for History, 2nd edition, (Edinburgh: Edinburgh University Press, 2016)
- (edited with J. Vernon), The Peculiarities of Liberal Modernity in Imperial Britain (Berkeley, CA.: University of California Press, 2011)
- History and Cultural Theory (London: Longman, 2006)
- (with Rachel Bell) Middle Classes (London: Cassell, 2003) to accompany the BBC TV series Middle Classes: Their Rise and Sprawl
- (edited with R. J. Morris), Identities in Space: Contested Terrains in the Western City Since 1850 (Aldershot: Ashgate 2001)
- The Public Culture of the Victorian Middle Class (Manchester: Manchester University Press, 2000)

=== Articles ===
- "Ring road: Birmingham and the collapse of the motor city ideal in 1970s Britain", Historical Journal (2017).
- "European urbanities since 1945", Contemporary European History, 22:4 (2015), pp. 617–22
- (with C. Hyde) "Post-industrial place, multicultural spac: the transformation of Leicester, c. 1970–1990", International Journal of Regional and Local History, vol. 8, issue 2 (2013), pp. 94–111
- "People and the car: the expansion of automobility in urban Britain, c. 1955–1970", Social History, vol. 38, issue 2 (2013), pp. 220–37
- "The Buchanan report, environment and the problem of traffic in 1960s Britain", Twentieth Century British History, vol. 22, issue 4 (2011), pp. 521–42
- "The rise and fall of British urban modernism: planning Bradford, c.1945-1970", Journal of British Studies, vol. 49, issue 4 (2010), pp. 849–69
