= Charles Boog Watson =

Scottish engineer and antiquarian

Charles Brodie Boog Watson FRSE FSA(Scot) (7 November 1858 – 16 January 1947) was a 19th/20th-century Scottish engineer and antiquarian. His analytical and accurate approach to research makes him a historian's historian especially in the field of social history.

He left a large collection of books and documents to the city on his death, known as the Boog Watson Bequest.

== Life ==
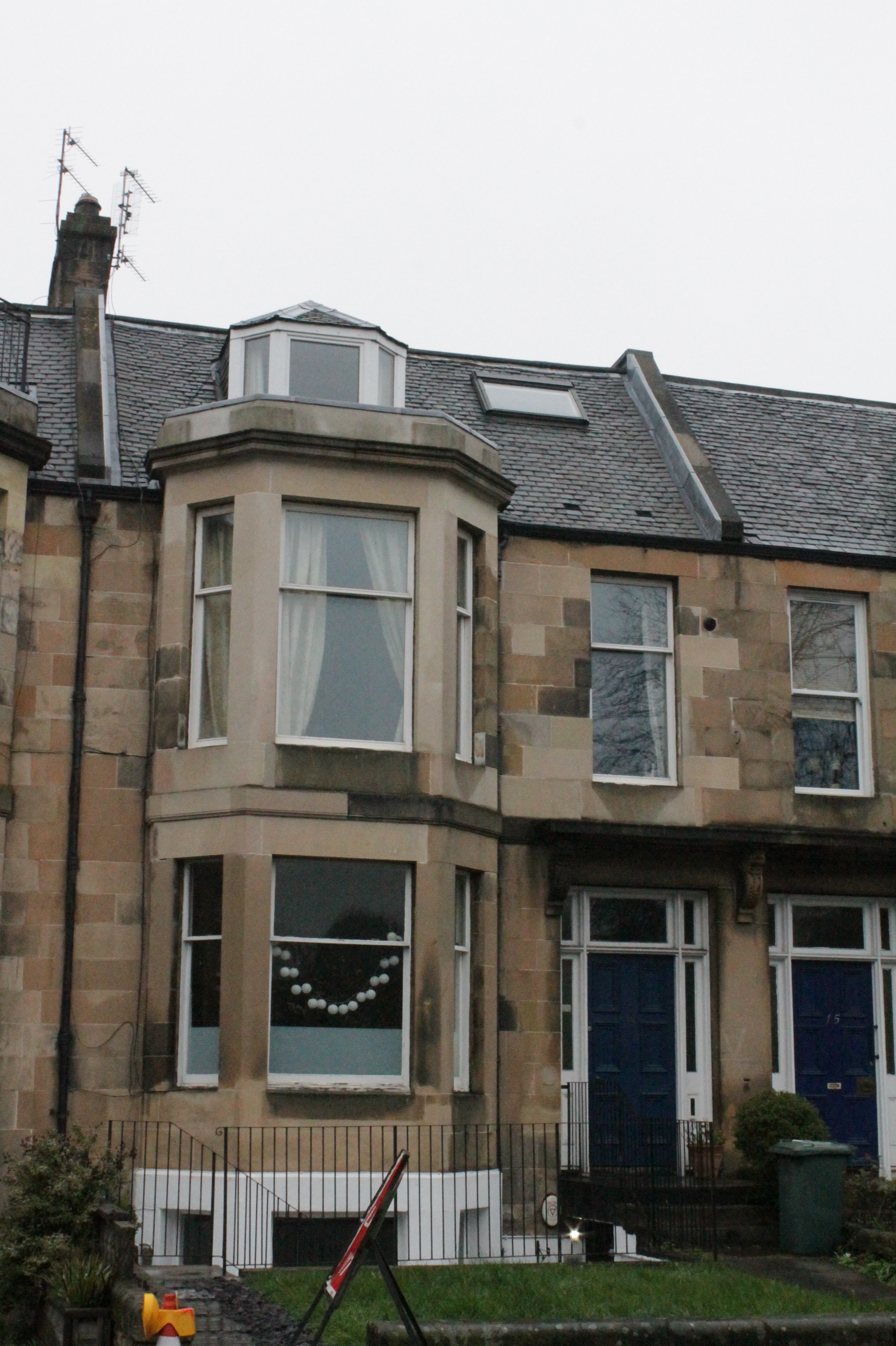
16 Granville Terrace, Edinburgh

He was born on 7 November 1858 in Bombay in India the son of Rev Robert Boog Watson and his wife Janet Cowan, daughter of Alexander Cowan.

From 1869 to 1876 he was educated at Edinburgh Academy. During this period his parents lived with his uncle, Patrick Heron Watson in a Georgian townhouse at Hope Street off Charlotte Square.

Not until 1895 does Charles appear as a home-owner (despite being married for several years). He then appears living at 16 Granville Terrace in the Merchiston district of Edinburgh. He is then listed for the first time as "engineer, West End Engine Works", these being at 170 Dundee Street. He was later made a partner in this company.

In 1904 he was elected a Fellow of the Royal Society of Edinburgh. His proposers were John Sturgeon Mackay, Patrick Heron Watson, Sir William Turner, and Alexander Crum Brown.

He retired from engineering in 1908 and then applied himself to research and cataloguing of Edinburgh's history, being given his own room in Edinburgh City Chambers for this purpose. He was an active member of the Old Edinburgh Club from 1920 to 1940 and author and transcriber for them of a 1635 census of property owners in Edinburgh. In 1933 he joined the ruling council of the Cockburn Association, Edinburgh's influential conservation organisation.

In the Second World War aged over 80, he served as an ARP warden in Edinburgh. His wartime journal is part of the Manuscript Collection of Edinburgh Central Library, along with his detailed historical notebooks.

He died at home, 24 Garscube Terrace in western Edinburgh on 16 January 1947 aged 88 and was cremated at Warriston Crematorium.

== Family ==
In 1882 he was married to Jane Ballantine Nairn. Their daughter Elspeth Janet Boog Watson became a noted writer.

His sister was Helen Brodie Cowan Watson.

His uncle was Patrick Heron Watson.

== Publications ==
- Some Notes on Moray House, Edinburgh (1915)
- Roll of Edinburgh Burgesses and Guild Brethren 1406 to 1760 (1930)
- The Maps of Edinburgh 1544 to 1929 (1932)
- Traditions of the Watsons
- History and Derivation of Edinburgh Street Names
- Register of Edinburgh Apprentices 1666 to 1755
