= David Stevenson (Scottish historian) =

David Stevenson (born 1942) is a Scottish historian and emeritus professor of Scottish history at the University of St Andrews.

Stevenson was born in Largs in Ayrshire. and studied in Dublin and Glasgow where he completed his PhD in 1970, "The Covenanters and Government of Scotland, 1637–1651". He was a lecturer and reader at the University of Aberdeen. He was Professor of Scottish History at the University St Andrews (1991–1994).

== Selected publications ==
- The Hunt for Rob Roy: The Man and the Myths (2004), winner of the Frank Watson Book Prize.
- (with Peter Graves), Scotland's Royal Wedding (Edinburgh: John Donald, 1997).
- The Origins of Freemasonry: Scotland's Century, 1590-1710 (Cambridge University Press, 1988).
- The First Freemasons: Scotland's Early Lodges and their Members (Aberdeen University Press, 1988). (Second Edition, The Grand Lodge of Antient Free and Accepted Masons of Scotland, 2001).
- "The National Covenant: A list of known copies", Scottish Church History Society (1988), pp. 255–259.
- Scottish Covenanters and Irish Confederates: Scottish-Irish Relations in the Mid-Seventeenth Century (Ulster Historical Foundation, 1981).
- The Scottish Revolution 1637–44: The Triumph of the Covenanters (London, 1973).
