= Middle Classes: Their Rise and Sprawl =

Television series

- Genre: Documentary
- Presented by: Geoffrey Palmer
- Country of origin: United Kingdom
- Original language: English
- No. of series: 1
- No. of episodes: 6

Production
- Executive producer: Michael Poole
- Producer: Rachel Bell
- Running time: 50 mins

Original release
- Network: BBC Two
- Release: 23 February – 30 March 2001

Middle Classes: Their Rise and Sprawl was a six-part BBC documentary television series broadcast in the United Kingdom in 2001, narrated by Geoffrey Palmer.

It gained favourable reviews including from Will Self who said "No simple overview can do justice to this programme — an exemplary series and mandatory viewing."

In 2002 an accompanying book was published, written by the historian Simon Gunn and television producer Rachel Bell. The television series was repeated on BBC Four in 2007, but as of 2022 was not available to view on BBC iPlayer.

The series found renewed attention in 2022 with the launch of the Conservative Party leadership campaign of Rishi Sunak, who featured in the programme. Sunak, then a student at Lincoln College, Oxford, was interviewed with his parents in episode five, about their decision to educate him at the independent school Winchester College. Sunak said "I have friends who are aristocrats, I have friends who are upper class, I have friends who are, you know, working class but – well, not working class – but I mix and match." In the accompanying book Sunak says "I am very lucky to have been at these places, it does put me as an elite in society."

== Episodes ==
#	Title	Original release date
1	"The People in Between"	23 February 2001
Social mobility and middle-class life in Victorian suburbia
2	"Them and Us"	2 March 2001
Snobbery and class hatred between the wars, illustrated by the walls erected in Cutteslowe, Oxfordshire
3	"Leader of Society"	9 March 2001
The Establishment and meritocracy before and after the Second World War
4	"Troublemakers"	16 March 2001
Middle-class radicals
5	"Lessons in Class"	23 March 2001
Comprehensive and private education, illustrated by Winchester College. Rishi Sunak is interviewed for this episode.
6	"Trouble Ahead"	30 March 2001
Recent changes to middle-class values and attitudes
