= Graeme Morton (historian) =

Scottish academic historian

Graeme Morton is a Scottish academic historian who has occupied the Chair of Modern History at the University of Dundee since 2013.

== Career ==
Morton completed a master of arts degree (MA) in economic and social history and sociology in 1989, and a doctorate of philosophy (PhD) at the University of Edinburgh in 1993; his doctoral thesis was entitled Unionist-nationalism: the historical construction of Scottish national identity, Edinburgh, 1830–1860. He lectured at Edinburgh from 1992 until 2004, when he was appointed to the inaugural Scottish Studies Foundation Chair at the University of Guelph; while in this post, he was Director of the university's Centre for Scottish Studies. In 2013, he returned to Scotland as Professor of Modern History at the University of Dundee; he remains an adjunct professor of history at the University of Guelph.

== Research ==
Morton's research interests include Scottish national identity and nationalism (including the significance of William Wallace), as well as the urban history of Scotland, and civil society and associational activity. His published works include:

- William Wallace: A National Tale (Edinburgh: Edinburgh University Press, 2014).
- (edited with D.A. Wilson) Irish and Scottish Encounters with Indigenous Peoples: Canada, the United States, Australia and New Zealand (Montreal and Kingston: McGill-Queen's University Press, 2013).
- (with T. Bueltmann and A. Hinson) The Scottish Diaspora (Edinburgh: Edinburgh University Press, 2013).
- Ourselves and Others: Scotland, 1832–1914 (Edinburgh: Edinburgh University Press, 2012).
- (edited with T. Griffiths) A History of Everyday Life in Scotland, vol. 3, 1800–1900 (Edinburgh: Edinburgh University Press, 2010).
- (edited with T. Bueltmann and A. Hinson) Ties of Bluid, Kin and Countrie: Scottish Associational Culture in the Diaspora (Guelph: Centre for Scottish Studies, 2009).
- (edited with B. de Vries and R. J. Morris) Civil Society, Associations and Urban Places: Class, Nation and Culture in Nineteenth-Century Europe (Stroud: Ashgate, 2006).
- William Wallace: Man and Myth (Stroud: Sutton Publishing, 2001).
- Unionist Nationalism: Governing Urban Scotland, 1830–1860 (East Linton: Tuckwell Press, 1999).
- (with A. Morris) Locality, Community and Nation (London: Hodder and Stoughton, 1998).
