= Philippa Maddern =

Australian historian and academic

Philippa Catherine "Pip" Maddern (1952 – 16 June 2014) was an Australian historian and academic, who was Director of the Australian Research Council's Centre of Excellence for the History of Emotions.

== Biography ==
Maddern was born in Albury, New South Wales in 1952, to Elsie and Ivan Maddern. Her father was a local headmaster. Maddern spent much of her childhood in Morwell, in Gippsland. She did a double Honours degree at the University of Melbourne in History and Indonesian Studies, graduating in 1983. In 1985 Maddern graduated from the University of Oxford with a DPhil for research that was later published as Violence and Social Order: East Anglia 1422–1442. She was awarded a Sugden Fellowship at Queen's College, University of Melbourne, and then from 1986 to 1987 was a Tutor in History at Monash University. In 1989 Maddern was appointed to a Lectureship in Medieval History at the University of Western Australia where she worked with Patricia Crawford. From 1996 until her death she was on the editorial board for the journal Parergon. In 2005 Maddern became Winthrop Professor of History at The University of Western Australia. She was also a former Head of History and the School of Humanities, and in 2011 she became Director of the Australian Research Council's Centre of Excellence for the History of Emotions.

Maddern's founding and directorship of the Centre for the History of Emotions grew out of her research into late medieval and early modern children's experiences and gender history. Her research into medieval England covered: the survival strategies of single mothers; the experience of children in blended families; domestic violence; social mobility; widows and land ownership; and the phenomenon of 'serial monogamy'. Her work on the history of medieval society was founded on the painstaking examination of everyday records such as wills and court documents, which helped bring to life the often submerged history of marginalised and vulnerable social groups. Maddern worked extensively in the local records offices in England, particularly in East Anglia. She also wrote about the exhumation of the skeleton of the medieval king Richard III.

She was also a writer of science fiction, and was nominated multiple times for the Ditmar Awards, winning a Special Committee award in 1977 for her work 'The Ins and Outs of the Hadhya City State'. The acclaimed science fiction writer Ursula Le Guin said of Maddern: "It grieves me very much to know Philippa is dead, yet it gives me joy to remember her in life. Teaching workshops you meet a few people like her, you smile when you think about them, you always are grateful to them for being who they were, for writing what they wrote, for believing that you could teach them anything."

Maddern was well known for her musical expertise: she was a recorder player in the early music group Tre Fontane, which also featured Kate Burridge, now Professor of Linguistics at Monash, and the singer/musicologist Helen Dell, a Melbourne Research Fellow.

Maddern was married to Edward (Ted) Mundie who died in 2005.

== Awards, honours, prizes ==
- The Australia/New Zealand Association for Medieval and Early Modern Studies (ANZAMEMS) has an biennial Philippa Maddern ECR Publication Prize, which is awarded to an Early Career Researcher (ECR) for the best article-length scholarly work in any discipline/topic falling within the scope of medieval and early modern studies, published within the previous two years.
- The Philippa Maddern Seminar Room in the Faculty of Arts building of the University of Western Australia Campus was named after her.
- UWA's Academic Staff Association has launched a biennial award series named after Philippa Maddern to recognise the positive influences that academics have on students and UWA, and as individuals or professionals on the wider community. The award celebrates Philippa Maddern's life and the legacy of her inspirational leadership.

== Publications ==
=== Monographs ===
- Violence and Social Order: East Anglia 1422-1442 (1992) ISBN 0198202350
- St. Hilda's College: Forerunners and Foundations (1989) ISBN 0731662881

=== Edited collections ===
- Crawford, Patricia; Maddern, Philppa, eds. (1997), Women As Australian Citizens, Melbourne University Press, ISBN 9780522849080
- Lynch, Andrew; Maddern, Philippa, eds. (1995), Venus & Mars: engendering love and war in medieval and early modern Europe, University of Western Australia Press, ISBN 1875560459
- Hetherington, Penelope; Maddern, Philippa, eds. (1993), Sexuality and Gender in History: selected essays, Centre for Western Australia History at the University of Western Australia, ISBN 9780864222183
- Maddern, Philippa; McEwan, Joanne; Scott, Anne M., eds. (2018), Performing Emotions in Early Europe, Brepols, ISBN 9782503572376

=== Articles and essays ===
- 'Reading Faces: How Did Late Medieval Europeans Interpret Emotions in Faces?' postmedieval: a journal of medieval cultural studies 8.1 (2017): 12‒34.
- '"It is Full Merry in Heaven": The Pleasurable Connotations of "Merriment" in Late Medieval England'. In Pleasure in the Middle Ages, edited by N. Cohen-Hanegbi and P. Nagy, pp. 21–38. Turnhout: Brepols Publishers, 2018. ISBN 9782503575209
- 'Rhetorics of Death and Resurrection: Child Death in Late-Medieval English Miracle Tales'. In Death, Emotion and Childhood in Premodern Europe, edited by K. Barclay, K. Reynolds and C. Rawnsley, pp. 45‒63. Basingstoke: Palgrave Macmillan, 2016. ISBN 9781137571991
- 'A Market for Charitable Performances? Bequests to the Poor and their Recipients in Fifteenth-Century Norwich Wills'. In Experiences of Charity, 1250–1650: Revisiting Religious Motivations in the Charitable Endeavour, edited by Anne Scott, pp. 79–103. Farnham: Ashgate, 2015. ISBN 9781472443397
- 'How Children were Supposed to Feel: How Children Felt: England 1350-1530'. In Childhood and Emotion Across Cultures 1450–1800, edited by C. Jarzebowski and T. M. Safley, pp. 121–40. Routledge: Oxford and New York, 2014. ISBN 9780415831956, ISBN 9780415831963
- 'Murdering Souls and Killing Bodies: Understanding Spiritual and Physical Sin in Late-Medieval English Devotional Works'. In Conjunctions of Mind, Soul and Body from Plato to the Enlightenment, edited by D. Kambasković, pp. 25–45. Dordrecht: Springer, Studies in the History of the Philosophy of Mind 15, 2014. ISBN 978-94-017-9072-7
- 'Moving Households: Geographical Mobility and Serial Monogamy in England, 1350–1500', Parergon 24. 2 (2007): 69–92
- 'Widows and their Lands: Women, Lands and Texts in Fifteenth-Century Norfolk', Parergon 19.1 (2002): 123–50
- 'Honour among the Pastons: Gender and integrity in fifteenth-century English provincial society', Journal of Medieval History 14.4 (December 1988): 357–37

=== Science fiction ===
- The Ins and Outs of the Hadhya City-State" in The Altered I (anthology), edited by Lee Harding (1976)
- "Inhabiting the Interspaces" in Australian Science Fiction (anthology), edited by Van Ikin (1979)
