= Richard Rodger (academic) =

Richard G. Rodger, FRHistS, FAcSS, is a historian specialising in the urban, economic and social history of modern Britain. Previously Professor of Urban History and Director of the Centre for Urban History at the University of Leicester, and from 2007 to 2017 Professor of Economic and Social History at Edinburgh University.

== Career ==
Rodger completed his master of arts (MA) and doctor of philosophy (PhD) degrees in economics and economic history at Edinburgh University; his PhD was awarded in 1976 for a thesis entitled Scottish Urban Housebuilding, 1870–1914. He was appointed to a lectureship in economic history at Liverpool University (1971–79) before moving to the University of Leicester, where he was appointed as a lecturer economic and social history in 1979, subsequently becoming Professor of Urban History and Director of the Centre for Urban History and the East Midlands Oral History Archive. Rodger held a position as associate professor in the University of Kansas (1982–1986), and visiting positions at Trinity College, Hartford CT (1990), and Meijo University, Japan (2004). He also held an ESRC Senior Fellowship (1995) and a Leverhulme Senior Fellowship (1996) at Edinburgh University, where he returned in 2007 as Professor of economic and social history. He remains at Leicester University as an Honorary Visiting professor, and in 2017 became emeritus Professor of History at Edinburgh University.

In addition to his university appointments, Rodger has been the editor of the journal Urban History (from 1987 to 2007) and the series editor for Ashgate Publishing's Historical Urban Studies book series (1990 to 2010). He is a fellow of the Royal Historical Society and the Academy of Social Sciences. and he has been a member of the council of trustees of the Edinburgh conservationist organisation the Cockburn Association since 2011.

== Publications ==
Rodger's research relates to the urban, economic and social history of modern Britain and his publications include:

- Campaigning For Edinburgh: The Cockburn Association 1875-2049 (Birlinn, Edinburgh 2025) (with Cliff Hague) 246pp
- Happy Homes: Cooperation, Community and the Edinburgh Colonies (Word Bank 2022)
- (edited with Susanne Rau) Space and Spatial Relationships (Cambridge University Press, 2020) Special Issue, Urban History, vol 47
- (edited with Rebecca Madgin) Leicester: A Modern History (Carnegie, 2016)
- (with Paul Laxton) Insanitary City: H. D. Littlejohn and the Report on the Sanitary Condition of Edinburgh (1865) (Carnegie Publications, 2013).
- Edinburgh's Colonies: Housing the Workers (Argyll Press, 2012)
- (edited with G. Massard-Guilbaud) Environmental and Social Justice in the City: Historical Perspectives (White Horse Press, 2011)
- (edited with Joanna Herbert) Testimonies of the City: Identity, Community and Change in a Contemporary Urban World (Ashgate, 2007)
- (edited with Denis Menjot) Teaching Urban History in Europe (Leicester, 2006)
- (with R. Colls) Cities of Ideas: Civil Society and Urban Governance in Britain 1800–2000 (Ashgate, 2004)
- The Transformation of Edinburgh: Land, Property and Trust in the Nineteenth Century (Cambridge University Press, 2001) awarded the Frank Watson Book Prize in Scottish History for books published in 2001 and 2002
- Housing the People: the 'Colonies' of Edinburgh 1860–1950 (City of Edinburgh and Royal Commission on the Ancient and Historical Monuments of Scotland, 1999).
- Housing in Urban Britain 1780–1914 (Cambridge University Press, 1995)
- Research in Urban History (Scolar Press, 1994)
- (edited with D. Reeder, D. N. Nash, and P. Jones) Leicester in the Twentieth Century (Alan Sutton, 1993)
- (edited with R. J. Morris) The Victorian City: A Reader in British Urban History, 1820–1914 (Longmans, 1993)
- (edited) European Urban History: Prospect and Retrospect (Leicester University Press 1993)
- (edited) Scottish Housing in the Twentieth Century (Leicester University Press, 1989)
- Housing in Urban Britain 1780–1914: Class, Capitalism and Construction (Macmillan, 1989)
