= Fiona Edmonds =

English academic, medievalist and historian

Fiona Edmonds (born 1980) is an English academic, a medievalist and historian of Britain and Ireland, specialising in the era between the sixth and the twelfth centuries, with a particular focus on the history of the Britons of Wales and the Old North, as well as Scotland, Ireland and the Isle of Man.

She was a student of the University of Oxford, and completed her doctorate at New College, Oxford by 2006. She subsequently joined Anglo-Saxon, Norse and Celtic at the University of Cambridge, where she became a senior lecturer before moving to Lancaster University.

Her work on Gaelic influence in the Northumbrian Kingdom won the Frank Watson Book Prize in 2021 for "best book in Scottish history" over the previous two years, and was also shortlisted for the Saltire Society Literary Awards "Scottish History Book of the Year" in 2021. At Lancaster she is professor in regional history and the director of the Regional Heritage Centre.

== Select publications ==
- "Personal names and the cult of Patrick in eleventh-century Strathclyde and Northumbria", in Steven Boardman, John Reuben Davies and Eila Williamson (eds), Saints' Cults in the Celtic World (Woodbridge: Boydell and Brewer, 2009), pp. 42–65. ISBN 9781843834328
- Whithorn's renown in the early medieval period: Whithorn, 'Futerna' and 'magnum monasterium' (Whithorn: Friends of the Whithorn Trust, 2009)
- (ed. with Paul Russell) Tome: Studies in medieval Celtic history and law in honour of Thomas Charles-Edwards (Woodbridge, Suffolk: Boydell, 2011) ISBN 9781843836612
- (editor) Brittany and the Atlantic Archipelago, 450–1200: Contact, Myth and History (Cambridge University Press, 2021) ISBN 9781108486514
- Gaelic influence in the Northumbrian Kingdom: The Golden Age and the Viking Age (Woodbridge: The Boydell Press, 2019) ISBN 9781783273362
- (editor) Multi-Disciplinary Approaches to Medieval Brittany, 450-1200: Connections and Disconnections (Medieval Texts and Cultures of Northern Europe, 36) (Brepols, 2023) ISBN 9782503601106
- (contributor) Victoria County History of Westmorland I: Lonsdale Ward (Victoria County History, 2025) ISBN 9781904356585
- (editor) Viking Connections: Proceedings of the Nineteenth Viking Congress (Liverpool University Press, 2026) ISBN 9781805967422
