= Susan Broomhall =

Australian historian and academic

Academic background
- Education: University of Western Australia; Centre d'études supérieures de la Renaissance
- Thesis: Women and Publication in Sixteenth-century France (1999)

Academic work
- Institutions: University of Western Australia (1997–present); Australian Catholic University (2018–present)

Susan Broomhall FAHA is an Australian historian and academic. She is an Australian Research Council Future Fellow and Professor of History at The University of Western Australia, and from 2018 Co-Director of the ARC Centre of Excellence for the History of Emotions (CHE). She was a Foundation Chief Investigator (CI) in the 'Shaping the Modern' Program of the Centre, before commencing her Australian Research Council Future Fellowship within CHE in October 2014, and the Acting Director in 2011. She is a specialist in gender history and the history of emotions.

== Education ==
Broomhall was born in Perth in 1974. She graduated BA with First-Class Honours in French Studies and History at the University of Western Australia in 1996, and completed her PhD with Distinction at UWA in 1999, on 'Women and Publication in Sixteenth-century France', supervised by Patricia Crawford and Beverley Ormerod. She then completed a Diplome d'Etudes Approfondies, avec Mention Très Bien in 2000 at Centre d'études supérieures de la Renaissance, associated with Université François Rabelais, in Tours, France.

== Career ==
Broomhall's projects with the CHE analyse medieval and early modern objects and emotions, particularly as they are presented in modern museum, heritage and tourism environments. Her research explores i) the interpretation of medieval and early modern objects in the history of emotional processes and practices; ii) the affective origins of specific medieval and early modern objects; iii) the emotional interpretation of medieval and early modern objects in museum, gallery and tourism contexts; and iv) affective materiality.

Her Future Fellow research project focuses on emotions and power in the correspondence of Catherine de' Medici. She has also published extensively, with Jacqueline van Gent, on the history of the Nassau-Orange dynasty in the early modern Netherlands.

Broomhall was the editor of Parergon: The Journal of the Australian and New Zealand Association for Medieval and Early Modern Studies, from 2017 until 2021. She is also Series Editor of Gender and Power in the Premodern World.

== Awards and prizes ==
In 2012 Broomhall was elected a Fellow of the Australian Academy of the Humanities.

In 2017 she was awarded, with David Barrie, the Frank Watson Book Prize for Best Book in Scottish History (2015-2016) for the two-volume Police Courts in Nineteenth-Century Scotland.

Along with several other contributors, Broomhall was awarded the 2017 CHASS Australia Book Prize for Distinctive Work in the Humanities, Arts and Social Sciences (an annual prize awarded by the Council for the Humanities, Arts and Social Sciences) for her work on the Zest Festival.

In 1997 she was awarded the Bibliographical Society of Australia and New Zealand Essay Prize for the essay "French Women in Print, 1488 to 1599".

In 1999 she won the Society for the Social History of Medicine Student Essay Prize for her article on women's reproductive knowledge in sixteenth-century France.

== Bibliography ==
=== As author ===
- Crawford, Patricia; Broomhall, Susan (1997), Women in Early Modern Europe 1500-1800, History Dept., University of Western Australia
- Broomhall, Susan (2002), Women and the Book Trade in Sixteenth-century France, Ashgate, ISBN 978-0-7546-0671-0
- Broomhall, Susan (2004), Women's Medical Work in Early Modern France, Manchester University Press, ISBN 978-0-7190-6286-5
- Broomhall, Susan (2005), Women and Religion in Sixteenth-century France, Palgrave Macmillan, ISBN 978-1-4039-3681-3
- Spinks, Jennifer; Broomhall, Susan (2011), Early Modern Women in the Low Countries: feminizing sources and interpretations of the past, Ashgate (Firm), ISBN 978-1-4094-2537-3
- Barrie, David & Broomhall, Susan. Police Courts in Nineteenth-Century Scotland, Volume 1: Magistrates, Media and the Masses Ashgate, 2014.
- Barrie, David & Broomhall, Susan. Police Courts in Nineteenth-Century Scotland, Volume 2: Boundaries, Behaviours and Bodies Ashgate, 2014.
- Broomhall, Susan; Van Gent, Jacqueline (2016), Dynastic Colonialism: Gender, Materiality and the Early Modern House of Orange-Nassau, London Routledge/Taylor & Francis Group, ISBN 978-1-138-95336-9
- Broomhall, Susan; Van Gent, Jacqueline (2016), Gender, Power and Identity in the Early Modern House of Orange-Nassau, London New York Routledge, Taylor & Francis Group, ISBN 978-1-4094-5146-4

=== As editor ===
- Broomhall, Susan (2008), Emotions in the Household, 1200-1900, Palgrave Macmillan, ISBN 978-0-230-54311-9
- Broomhall, Susan; Tarbin, Stephanie (2008), Women, Identities and Communities in Early Modern Europe, Ashgate Pub. Co, ISBN 978-0-7546-6184-9
- Broomhall, Susan; Van Gent, Jacqueline (2011), Governing Masculinities in the Early Modern Period: Regulating Selves and Others, Ashgate, ISBN 978-1-4094-3238-8
- Broomhall, Susan; Pickering, Gina (2012), Rivers of Emotion : An Emotional History of Derbarl Yerrigan and Djarlgarro Beelier: The Swan and Canning Rivers, Australian Research Council Centre of Excellence History of Emotions, and National Trust of Australia (W.A.), ISBN 978-1-74052-260-1
- Barrie, David G; Broomhall, Susan (2012), A History of Police and Masculinities, 1700-2010, Routledge, Taylor & Francis Group, ISBN 978-0-415-67129-3
- Broomhall, Susan, ed. (2015), Spaces for Feeling: Emotions and Sociabilities in Britain, 1650-1850, Routledge, ISBN 978-1-315-73214-5
- Broomhall, Susan, ed. (2015), Authority, Gender and Emotions in Late Medieval and Early Modern England, Houndsmills, Basingstoke, Hampshire, UK New York Palgrave Macmillan, ISBN 978-1-137-53115-5
- Broomhall, Susan, ed. (2015), Ordering Emotions in Europe, 1100-1800, Leiden Boston Brill, ISBN 978-90-04-30509-0
- Broomhall, Susan, ed. (2016), Gender and Emotions in Medieval and Early Modern Europe: Destroying Order, Structuring Disorder, Routledge, ISBN 978-1-317-13068-0
- Broomhall, Susan; Finn, Sarah, eds. (2016), Violence and Emotions in Early Modern Europe, London Routledge, ISBN 978-1-317-42419-2
- Broomhall, Susan, ed. (2017), Early Modern Emotions: An Introduction, Routledge, ISBN 978-1-138-92574-8

=== In French ===
- Broomhall, S. & Winn, C. H. Le Verger fertile des vertus. Honoré Champion, 2004.
- Broomhall, S. & Winn, C. H. Les femmes et l'histoire familiale. Honoré Champion, 2008.
