= Robert Morris (historian) =

English economic historian (c. 1943 – 2022)

Robert John Morris, FRHistS (1943 – 26 November 2022), known professionally as R. J. Morris, was an English historian and Professor of Economic and Social History at the University of Edinburgh.

== Life and career ==
Morris was born in Sheffield, the son of Barbara Joan (née Aston) and George Ernest Morris. His birth was registered in the final quarter of 1943. His father was a teacher first in Wakefield and then in Leeds.

Morris studied politics, philosophy and economics at Keble College, Oxford, graduating with a Bachelor of Arts degree (BA) in 1965. He spent the following three years completing graduate study at Nuffield College, Oxford, and obtained a doctorate of philosophy (DPhil) from the university. In 1968, he joined the Department of Economic History in the Social Science Faculty of Edinburgh University and taught there until he retired, eventually being appointed professor of economic and social history. He also served as president of the European Urban History Association in 2000–02, and, as of 2017, was a patron of the Thoresby Society and president of the Scottish Economic and Social History Society.

Morris died in 2022, at the age of 79.

== Research ==
Morris's research has focused primarily on class and urbanisation, especially relating to the formation of the middle classes in nineteenth-century Britain, especially with reference to gender, and family and property relations. His publications include:

- "Voluntary Societies and British Urban Elites, 1780–1870: an analysis", The Historical Journal, vol.24 (1982), pp. 95–118.
- Class, Sect and Party. The Making of the British Middle Class: Leeds, 1820–50 (Manchester University Press, 1990).
- (ed. with W. H. Fraser) People and Society in Scotland vol. 2, 1830–1914 (Edinburgh: John Donald, 1990).
- (ed. with Richard Rodger) The Victorian City. A Reader in British Urban History, 1820–1914 (London: Longman, 1993).
- (ed. with R. H. Trainor) Urban Governance. Britain and beyond since 1750 (Aldershot: Ashgate Publishing Co, 2000).
- (ed. with Simon Gunn) Identities in Space: Contested Terrains in the Western City Since 1850 (Aldershot: Ashgate 2001).
- Men, Women and Property in England, 1780–1870 (Cambridge: Cambridge University Press, 2005).
- (ed. with G. Morton and B. de Vries) Civil Society, Associations and Urban Places (Aldershot: Ashgate, 2006).
- Scotland 1907: The Many Scotlands of Valentine and Sons Photographers (Edinburgh: Berlinn, 2007).
