= Robert Boog Watson =

Scottish malacologist (1823–1910)

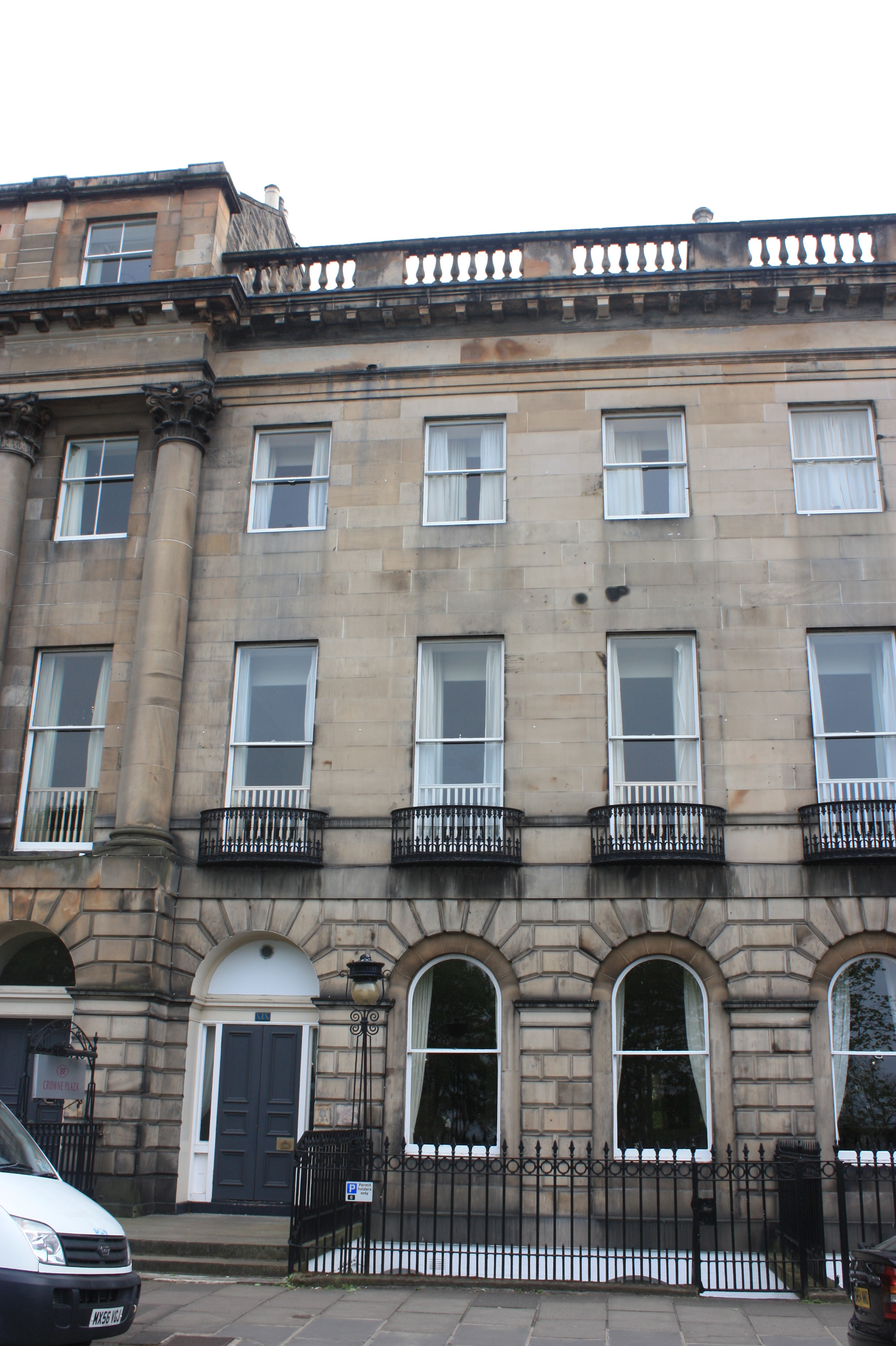
Watson's impressive home at 19 Royal Terrace, Edinburgh

Robert Boog Watson FRSE (26 September 1823 – 23 June 1910) was a Scottish malacologist and minister of the Free Church of Scotland best known as the author of the report on the Scaphopoda and Gastropoda collected during the H.M.S. Challenger expedition to survey the world's oceans from 1873 to 1876. Watson also described various Opisthobranchia from Madeira.

== Life ==
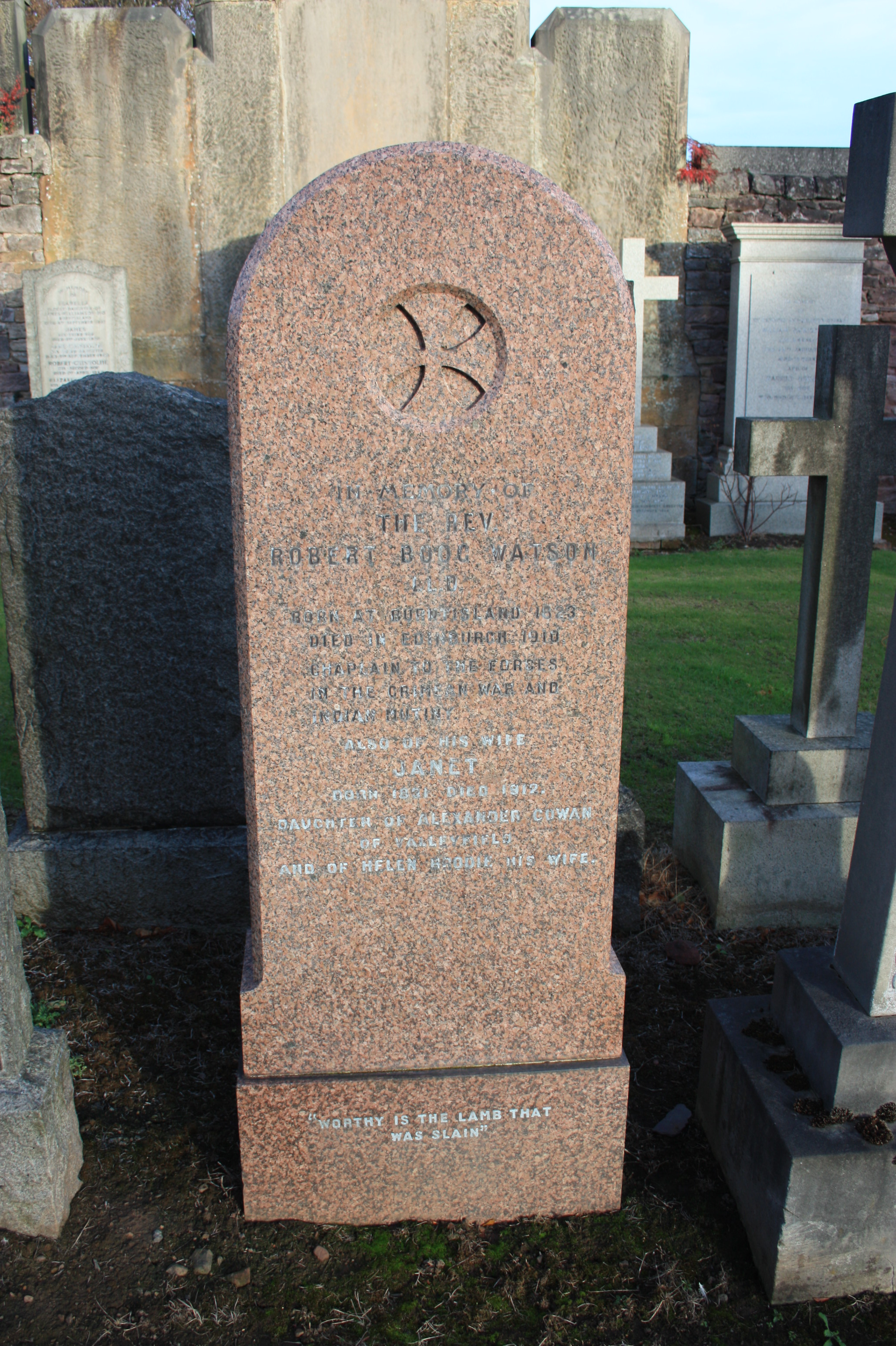
The grave of Rev Robert Boog Watson, Grange Cemetery

He was born in Burntisland in Fife. The family moved permanently to Edinburgh around 1840, living at 19 Royal Terrace on Calton Hill.

He was educated at Edinburgh Academy. He served as Chaplain to the Highland Brigade during the Crimean War, and later in Madeira. In 1858 he was living with his wife in Bombay in India.

He was elected a Fellow of the Royal Society of Edinburgh in 1862. During his stay in Edinburgh he lived with his brother Patrick Heron Watson at Hope Street off Charlotte Square. From 1864 to 1874 he served on the island of Madeira.

From 1877 onwards he is recorded as living at 19 Chalmers Street on the south side of Edinburgh.

He died in Edinburgh and is buried in the south-west section of Grange Cemetery with his wife Janet. The grave lies in the eastern row facing west. It bears the inscription "Worthy is the Lamb that was Slain".

== Family ==
In 1857 he was married to Janet Cowan (1831-1912) daughter of Alexander Cowan of Valleyfield.

Their daughter, the writer Helen Brodie Cowan Watson, married Major General William Burney Bannerman FRSE (1858–1924), the son of Rev James Bannerman. Their son was the engineer and antiquarian Charles Brodie Boog Watson FRSE (1858-1947) and granddaughter was writer and broadcaster Elspeth Janet Boog Watson.

He was related through the marriage of Jane Elisabeth Boog to the Very Rev Matthew Leishman of Govan Old Parish Church.

He was also related through his aunt, Christian Boog, to Mary Somerville, making her a distant aunt.

== Publications ==
- Geology of Luneburg
- The Great Drift Beds with Shells in the South of Arran
- Disruption in the Church of Canton de Vaud, Switzerland
- Robert Boog Watson (c. 1897). On the marine mollusca of Madeira : with descriptions of thirty-five new species and an index-list of all known sea-dwelling species of that island.
- George Dixon; Robert Boog Watson (1858). A Descriptive Manual of British Land and Fresh Water Shells, Containing Descriptions and Figures of All the Species.
