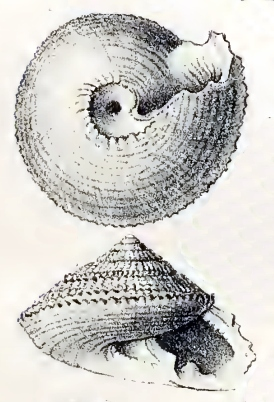
- Drawing with a basal and an apertural view of a shell of Ancistrobasis depressa

Scientific classification
- Kingdom: Animalia
- Phylum: Mollusca
- Class: Gastropoda
- Subclass: Vetigastropoda
- Superfamily: Seguenzioidea
- Family: Seguenziidae
- Subfamily: Seguenziinae
- Genus: Ancistrobasis; Dall, 1889

Type species
- Basilissa costulata Watson, R.B., 1879

Species
- See text

Synonyms
- Basilissa (Ancistrobasis) Dall, 1889 (original rank)

= Ancistrobasis =

Genus of gastropods

Ancistrobasis is a genus of sea snails, and marine gastropod mollusks in the family Seguenziidae.

Dall (1889) regarded (with some doubt) Ancistrobasis as a section of the closely related genus Basilissa Watson, 1879.

== Description ==
This genus contains the dentate forms of species formerly included in the genus Basilissa.

Shell: The conical shell shows peripheral carina and collabral axial riblets. The midwhorl angulation and the spiral lirae are present on all whorls. The posterior sinus depth is shallow. The posterior sinus has a U-shape. The anterolateral sinus is absent. The rhomboidal aperture contains a basal and columellar sinus. The umbilical septum (a transverse plate secreted with early formed whorls of the shell) is absent. The shell contains pustulate microsculpture.

Radula: The rachidian tooth is broader than high with lateral wings prominent. The lateral tooth cusp is broad. The radula contains less than 10 marginal tooth pairs.

== Species ==
Species within the genus Ancistrobasis include:

- Ancistrobasis adonis Marshall, 1991
- Ancistrobasis boucheti Marshall, 1991
- Ancistrobasis caledonica Marshall, 1991
- Ancistrobasis compsa Melvill, 1904
- Ancistrobasis depressa (Dall, 1889)
- Ancistrobasis dilecta Marshall, 1983
- Ancistrobasis largoi Poppe, Tagaro & Dekker, 2006
- Ancistrobasis monodon (Schepman, 1908)
- Ancistrobasis reticulata (Philippi, 1844)
- Ancistrobasis scitula Marshall, 1991
- Ancistrobasis tiara Marshall, 1991
- Ancistrobasis zumbii Lima, Christoffersen & Barros, 2013

Species brought into synonymy

- Ancistrobasis costulata (Watson, 1879): synonym of Ancistrobasis reticulata (Philippi, 1844)
- Ancistrobasis regina Marshall, 1983: synonym of Basilissopsis regina (Marshall, 1983)
