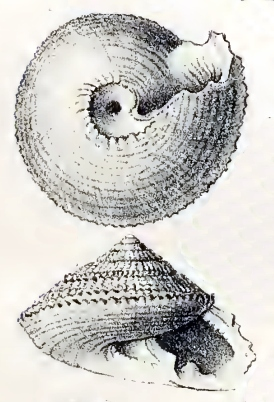
- Drawing with two views of a shell of Ancistrobasis depressa

Scientific classification
- Kingdom: Animalia
- Phylum: Mollusca
- Class: Gastropoda
- Subclass: Vetigastropoda
- Family: Seguenziidae
- Genus: Ancistrobasis
- Species: A. depressa

Binomial name
- Ancistrobasis depressa (Dall, 1889)

Synonyms
- Basilissa costulata var. depressa Dall, 1889

= Ancistrobasis depressa =

Species of gastropod

Ancistrobasis depressa is a species of sea snail, a marine gastropod mollusk in the family Seguenziidae.

== Description ==
(description by G.W. Tryon) The height of the shell attains 5 mm. The shell figured differs from Basillisa costulata Watson, 1879 (synonym of Ancistrobasis reticulata (Philippi, 1844) ) in the less flexuous radiating costae, which are nearly equal to the interspaces in width, and in the smaller number of spiral ridges, which are about ten on the base and seven to nine on the upper surface of the whorls. The armature of the aperture is a character which does not appear until full maturity. The other characters seem to agree closely with Watson's figure and description, and, taking into consideration the known variability of the abyssal shells, I do not feel justified in separating the Blake shells specifically from B. costulata. If I am correct in the identification, this material enables me to add a good deal to the knowledge of the species and genus.

The dried remains of the animal in one specimen bear a pellucid multispiral operculum a little more circular in outline than that of Seguenzia, but otherwise precisely like it. The aperture in the adult is strongly thickened a little distance within its margin, which remains sharp. The projecting peripheral part is a little bent in, recalling the aperture of Seguenzia. The callus on the body is thin and smooth, that within the outer lip is broad, thick, iridescent, and deeply grooved parallel with the external spirals, producing four or five ridges between the grooves above the carina and a large number of rather smaller ones below it. The columella is thickened concave and strongly reflected. Its basal extreme terminates in a stout tooth-like twist of the margin, beyond which is a deep sulcus in the callus extending nearly across the base, in the middle of which rises a solitary stout tooth-like ridge. The walls of the umbilicus are nearly smooth, and as regards the individual turns are somewhat concave. The protoconch in this form gives the impression, after a very close scrutiny of several fresh specimens, that it is really laid at right angles to the original axis and half immersed in the first post-nuclear turn. This is masked by the fact that the protoconch proper occupies less than a single turn, and appears thus more normal than it really is, if my suspicions are correct. (described as Basilissa costulata var. depressa)

== Distribution ==
This species occurs in the Gulf of Mexico, off the Yucatan Straits, Mexico.
