= Basilissopsis rhyssa =

Scientific classification
- Kingdom: Animalia
- Phylum: Mollusca
- Class: Gastropoda
- Subclass: Vetigastropoda
- Family: Seguenziidae
- Genus: Basilissopsis
- Species: B. rhyssa

Binomial name
- Basilissopsis rhyssa (Dall, 1927)

Synonyms
- Basilissa (Ancistrobasis) rhyssa Dall, 1927 (original combination)

Species of gastropod

Basilissopsis rhyssa is a species of sea snail, a marine gastropod mollusc in the family Seguenziidae.

== Description ==
The height of the shell attains 2.1 mm. The shell is very similar to the shell of Basilissopsis watsoni Dautzenberg & H. Fischer, 1897. The shell is nacreous and the outer lip possesses posterior and basal labral sinuses.

== Distribution ==
This marine species occurs in the Gulf of Mexico, in the Caribbean Sea off Cuba and in the Atlantic Ocean off Georgia.
