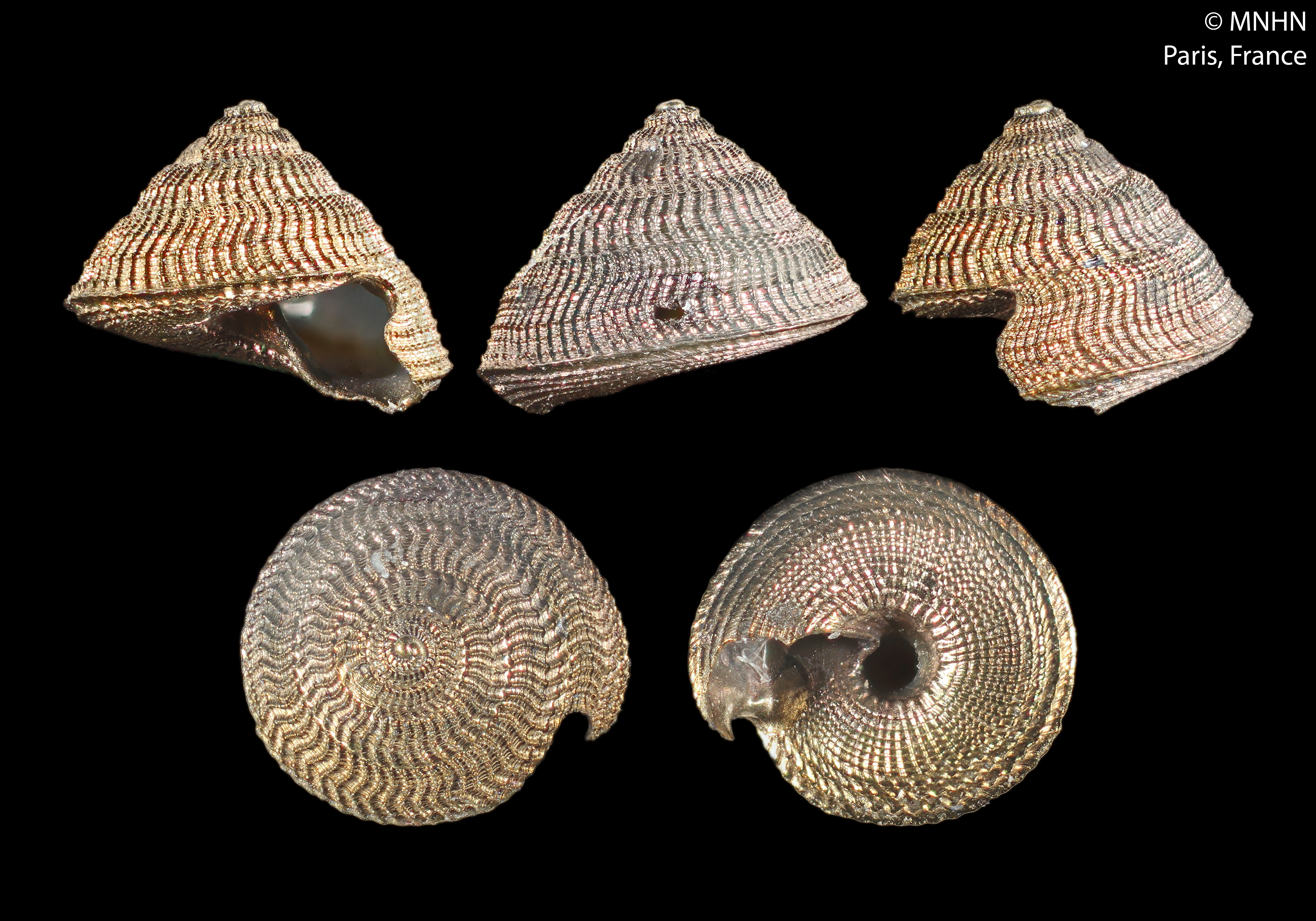
- Shell of Ancistrobasis tiara (holotype at MNHN, Paris)

Scientific classification
- Kingdom: Animalia
- Phylum: Mollusca
- Class: Gastropoda
- Subclass: Vetigastropoda
- Superfamily: Seguenzioidea
- Family: Seguenziidae
- Subfamily: Seguenziinae
- Genus: Ancistrobasis
- Species: A. tiara

Binomial name
- Ancistrobasis tiara Marshall, 1991

= Ancistrobasis tiara =

Species of gastropod

Ancistrobasis tiara is a species of extremely small deep water sea snail, a marine gastropod mollusk in the family Seguenziidae.

== Distribution ==
This marine species occurs off New Caledonia.
