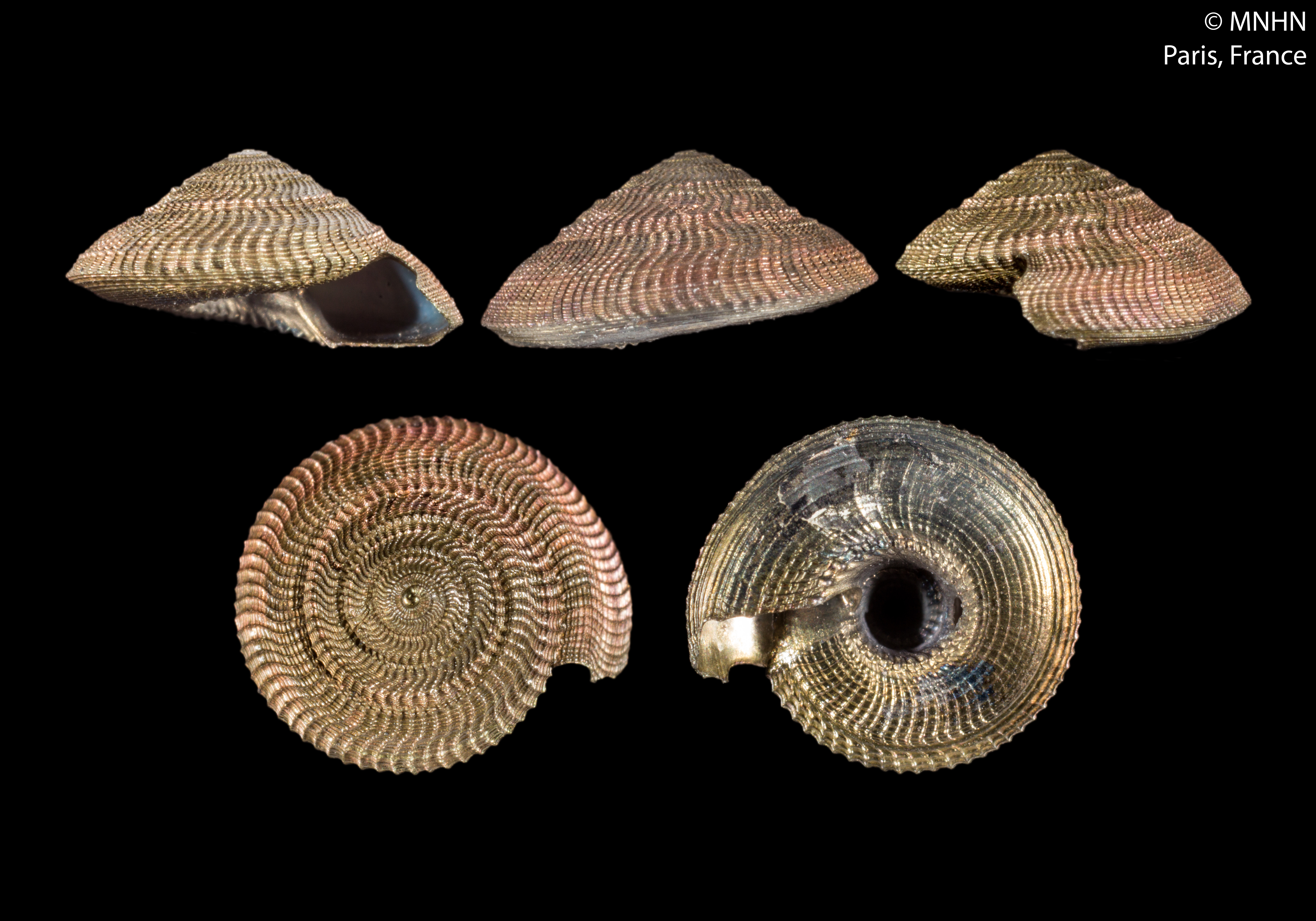
- Shell of Ancistrobasis adonis (holotype at MNHN, Paris)

Scientific classification
- Kingdom: Animalia
- Phylum: Mollusca
- Class: Gastropoda
- Subclass: Vetigastropoda
- Superfamily: Seguenzioidea
- Family: Seguenziidae
- Subfamily: Seguenziinae
- Genus: Ancistrobasis
- Species: A. adonis

Binomial name
- Ancistrobasis adonis Marshall, 1991

= Ancistrobasis adonis =

Species of gastropod

Ancistrobasis adonis is a species of extremely small deep water sea snail, a marine gastropod mollusk in the family Seguenziidae.

== Description ==
The length of the shell attains 17 mm.

== Distribution ==
This marine species occurs off New Caledonia.
