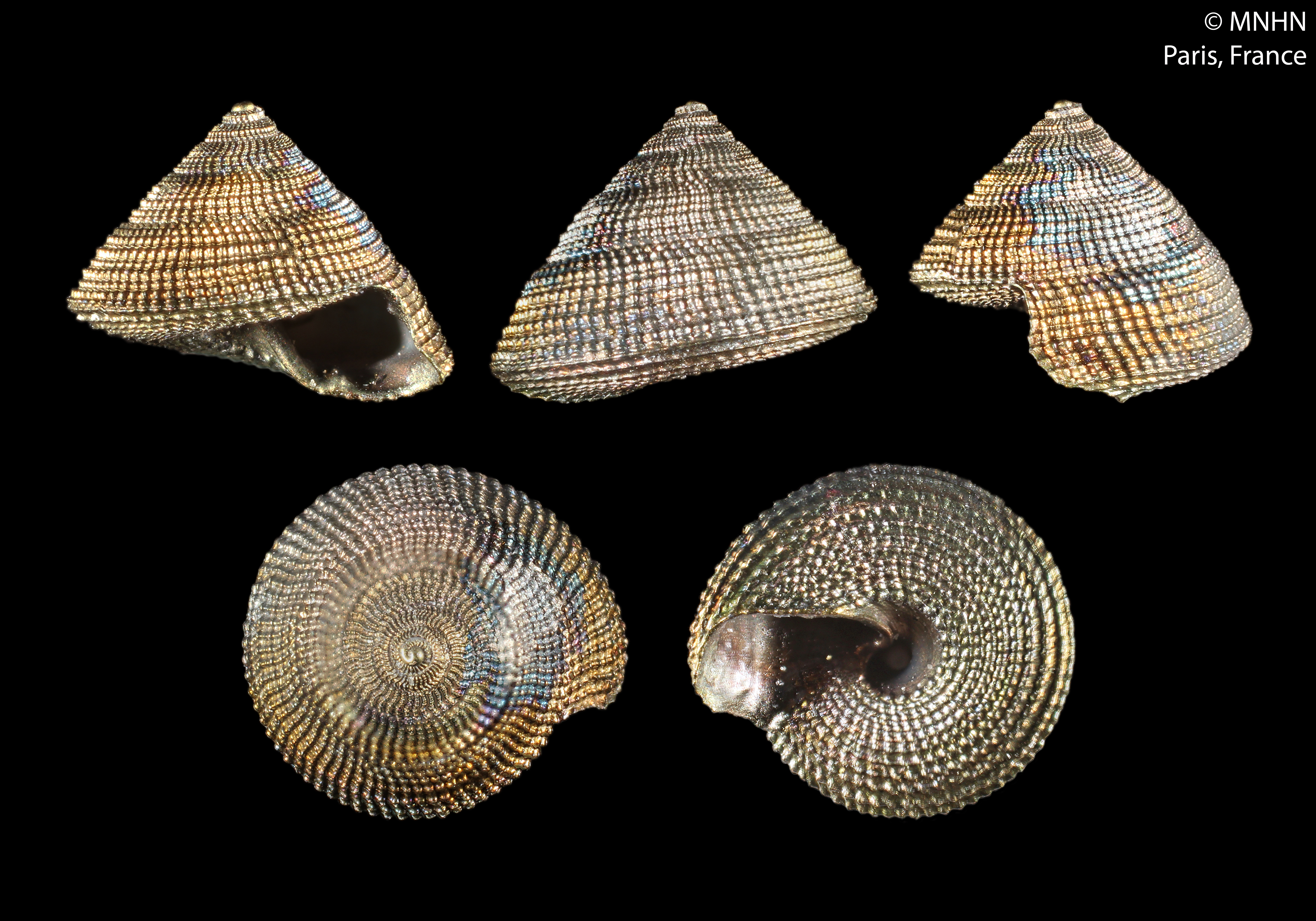
- Shell of Ancistrobasis caledonica (holotype at MNHN, Paris)

Scientific classification
- Kingdom: Animalia
- Phylum: Mollusca
- Class: Gastropoda
- Subclass: Vetigastropoda
- Superfamily: Seguenzioidea
- Family: Seguenziidae
- Subfamily: Seguenziinae
- Genus: Ancistrobasis
- Species: A. caledonica

Binomial name
- Ancistrobasis caledonica Marshall, 1991

= Ancistrobasis caledonica =

Species of gastropod

Ancistrobasis caledonica is a species of extremely small deep water sea snail, a marine gastropod mollusk in the family Seguenziidae.

== Distribution ==
This marine species occurs off New Caledonia.
