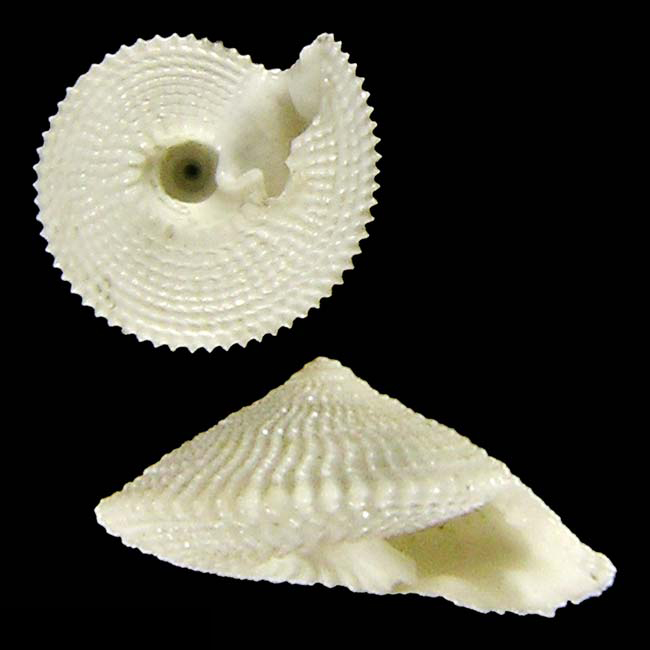

Scientific classification
- Kingdom: Animalia
- Phylum: Mollusca
- Class: Gastropoda
- Subclass: Vetigastropoda
- Family: Seguenziidae
- Genus: Ancistrobasis
- Species: A. largoi

Binomial name
- Ancistrobasis largoi Poppe, Tagaro & Dekker, 2006

= Ancistrobasis largoi =

Species of gastropod

Ancistrobasis largoi is a species of sea snail, a marine gastropod mollusk in the family Seguenziidae.

== Description ==
The size of the shell varies between 3 mm and 7 mm.

== Distribution ==
This marine species occurs off the Philippines.
