= Ancistrobasis compsa =

Scientific classification
- Kingdom: Animalia
- Phylum: Mollusca
- Class: Gastropoda
- Subclass: Vetigastropoda
- Superfamily: Seguenzioidea
- Family: Seguenziidae
- Subfamily: Seguenziinae
- Genus: Ancistrobasis
- Species: A. compsa

Binomial name
- Ancistrobasis compsa Melvill, 1904

Species of gastropod

Ancistrobasis compsa is a species of extremely small deep water sea snail, a marine gastropod mollusk in the family Seguenziidae.
