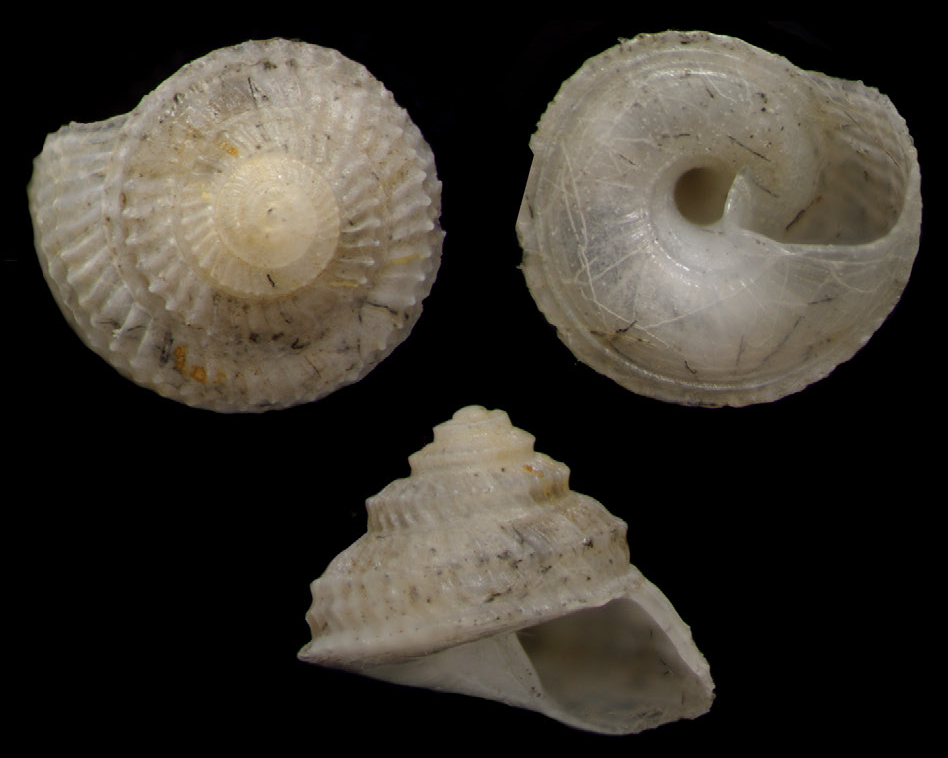

Scientific classification
- Kingdom: Animalia
- Phylum: Mollusca
- Class: Gastropoda
- Subclass: Vetigastropoda
- Family: Seguenziidae
- Genus: Basilissopsis
- Species: B. watsoni

Binomial name
- Basilissopsis watsoni Dautzenberg & Fischer, 1897

= Basilissopsis watsoni =

Species of gastropod

Basilissopsis watsoni is a species of sea snail in the family Seguenziidae.

== Description ==
The height of the nacreous shell attains 2 mm. The shell has labral sinuses.

== Distribution ==
This species occurs in the Atlantic Ocean off the Azores and NW Spain (Galicia Bank).
