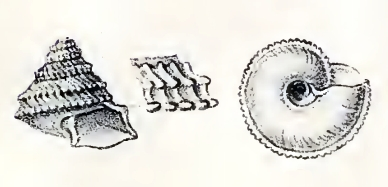
- Drawing with two views of a shell of Basilissopsis oxytropis

Scientific classification
- Kingdom: Animalia
- Phylum: Mollusca
- Class: Gastropoda
- Subclass: Vetigastropoda
- Superfamily: Seguenzioidea
- Family: Seguenziidae
- Subfamily: Seguenziinae
- Genus: Basilissopsis
- Species: B. oxytropis

Binomial name
- Basilissopsis oxytropis (Watson, 1879)

Synonyms
- Basilissa oxytropis Watson, 1879

= Basilissopsis oxytropis =

Species of gastropod

Basilissopsis oxytropis is a species of extremely small deep water sea snail, a marine gastropod mollusk in the family Seguenziidae.

== Description ==
The height of the shell attains 1.4 mm. The small, high shell has a conical shape. It is scalar, with a sharp, expressed carina at the periphery and a second carina above, angulating the 5 1/2 whorls.

Sculpture : there are a few close-set slight spirals on the edge of the flat base. There are many not close-set, flexuous, longitudinal ribs above the periphery, but on the base merely lines of growth. These ribs in crossing the upper carina form small sharp-pointed tubercles, of which there is also a trace on the lower carina. The superior sinus lies just above the upper carina, the basal sinus toward the middle of the base. Both are well marked. The apex is small and flat, the smooth embryonic 1 1/4 whorl hardly rising at all. The whorls show a slow increase. The columella is perpendicular, with a strong rounded sinus, which corresponds to a swelling within the umbilicus. The umbilicus is not large, but deep, funnel-shaped, with a puckered sharp edge.

== Distribution ==
This species occurs in the Atlantic Ocean off Ascension Islands.
