= Basilissopsis hakuhoae =

Scientific classification
- Kingdom: Animalia
- Phylum: Mollusca
- Class: Gastropoda
- Subclass: Vetigastropoda
- Family: Seguenziidae
- Genus: Basilissopsis
- Species: B. hakuhoae

Binomial name
- Basilissopsis hakuhoae Kurihara & Ohta, 2008

Species of gastropod

Basilissopsis hakuhoae is a species of sea snail, a marine gastropod mollusc in the family Seguenziidae.
