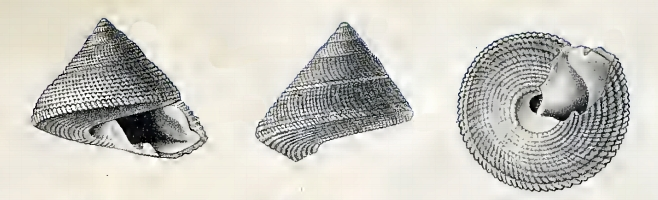
- Original drawing with three views of a shell of Ancistrobasis monodon

Scientific classification
- Kingdom: Animalia
- Phylum: Mollusca
- Class: Gastropoda
- Subclass: Vetigastropoda
- Superfamily: Seguenzioidea
- Family: Seguenziidae
- Subfamily: Seguenziinae
- Genus: Ancistrobasis
- Species: A. monodon

Binomial name
- Ancistrobasis monodon (Schepman, 1908)

Synonyms
- Calliostoma (Astele) monodon Schepman, 1908 (original description)

= Ancistrobasis monodon =

Species of gastropod

Ancistrobasis monodon is a species of extremely small deep water sea snail, a marine gastropod mollusk in the family Seguenziidae.

== Description ==
(Original description by Schepman) The height of the shell attains 4¾ mm. The yellowish-white, perforate, conical shell has slightly convex sides, The six whorls are slightly convex. The nucleus is smooth. The other whorls are sculptured by numerous concentric ribs and spiral lirae, about 9 in number on the penultimate whorl, producing a cancellated appearance. Where they cross, they form small tubercles. The body whorl is angular at the periphery. The flat base of the shell is sculptured by 12 spiral lirae and by radiating riblets, which make the inner 9 lirae beaded, the outer ones being crenulated. The small umbilicus is funnel-shaped, pervious, with smooth walls. The aperture is rhombic. Its upper margin is nearly straight, thin, thickened interiorly by a broad, white rib, with a few short plicae. The basal margin is slightly convex, with a few inconspicuous plicae and a strong tooth near the columella, forming the end of an internal rib, winding round the columella. The columella is nearly straight. Its upper part is thickened, covering part of the umbilicus. The parietal wall has a thin layer of enamel.

== Distribution ==
This marine species occurs off the Sulu Archipelago, Philippines, and off New Caledonia.
