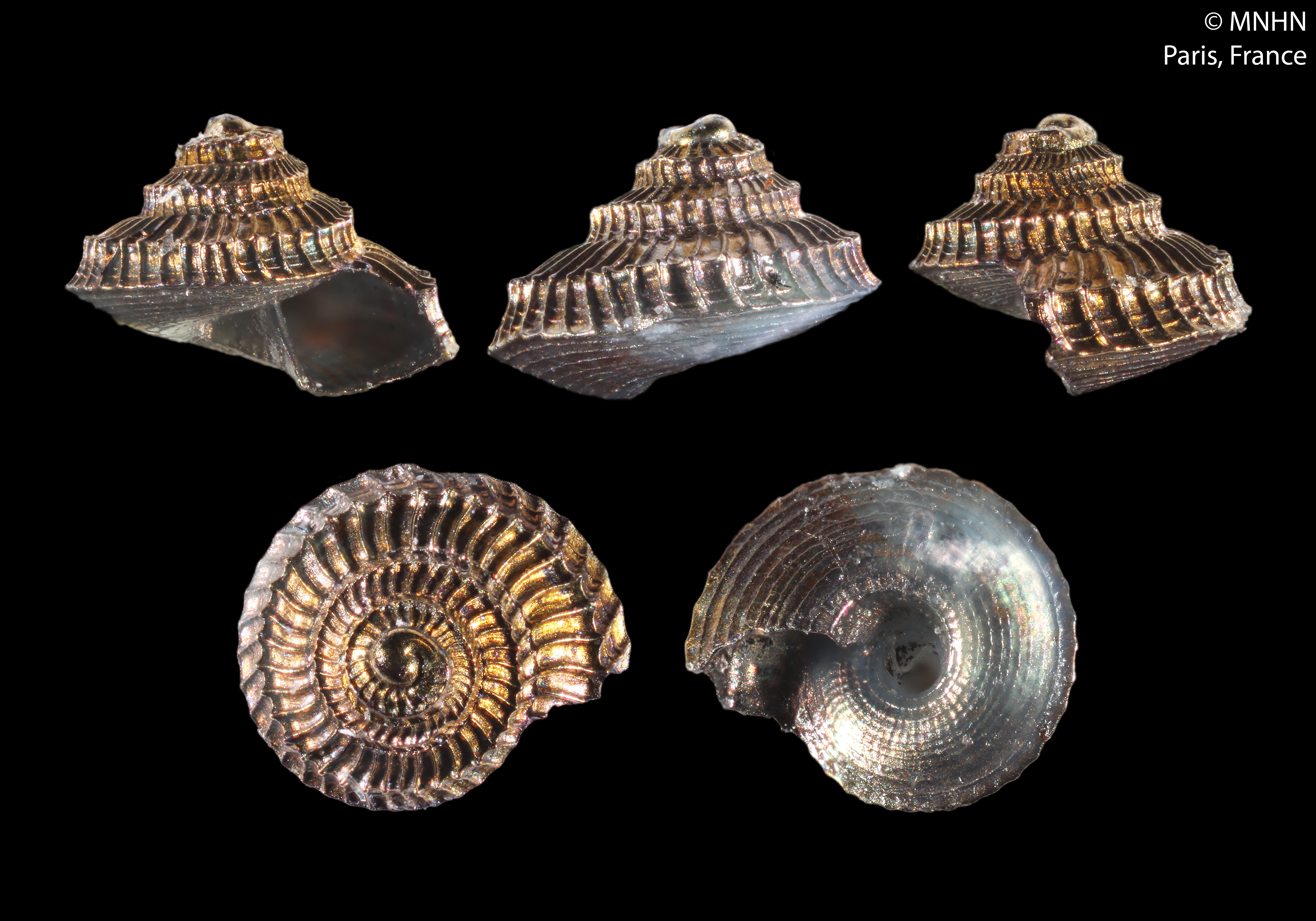
- Shell of Basilissopsis charcoti (holotype at MNHN, Paris)

Scientific classification
- Kingdom: Animalia
- Phylum: Mollusca
- Class: Gastropoda
- Subclass: Vetigastropoda
- Superfamily: Seguenzioidea
- Family: Seguenziidae
- Subfamily: Seguenziinae
- Genus: Basilissopsis; Dautzenberg & H. Fischer, 1897

Type species
- Basilissopsis watsoni Dautzenberg & H. Fischer, 1897

= Basilissopsis =

Genus of gastropods

Basilissopsis is a genus of sea snails in the family Seguenziidae.

In 1897 Dautzenberg and Fischer created this new genus for their specimen of Basilissopsis watsoni, based on the shell characteristics of discolored specimens that were non-nacreous and lacked labral sinuses. This was however contradicted later by the discovery of other species in this genus that possess nacre and labral sinuses. This puts this genus in the family Seguenziidae.

== Description ==
Nothing is known of the anatomy of the soft body in these species. The conical shell has peripheral carina and collabral axial riblets. All whorls contain midwhorl angulation but spiral lirae are absent. The U-shaped posterior sinus is shallow. There is no anterolateral sinus. A basal sinus is present. A columellar sinus is lacking. The aperture has a rhomboidal shape. A columellar tooth is lacking. The umbilicus contains a septum. The shell has no microsculpture. There are no data about the radula.

== Species ==
Species within the genus Basilissopsis include:

- Basilissopsis athenae Hoffman, Gofas & Freiwald, 2020
- Basilissopsis bassa Lima, Christoffersen & Villacampa, 2014
- Basilissopsis charcoti Marshall, 1991
- Basilissopsis hakuhoae Kurihara & Ohta, 2008
- Basilissopsis oxytropis (Watson, 1879)
- Basilissopsis regina (Marshall, 1983)
- Basilissopsis rhyssa (Dall, 1927)
- Basilissopsis vanheugteni Hoffman & Freiwald, 2017
- Basilissopsis watsoni Dautzenberg & Fischer, 1897
