= Ancistrobasis zumbii =

Scientific classification
- Kingdom: Animalia
- Phylum: Mollusca
- Class: Gastropoda
- Subclass: Vetigastropoda
- Superfamily: Seguenzioidea
- Family: Seguenziidae
- Subfamily: Seguenziinae
- Genus: Ancistrobasis
- Species: A. zumbii

Binomial name
- Ancistrobasis zumbii Lima, Christoffersen & Barros, 2013

Species of gastropod

Ancistrobasis zumbii is a species of extremely small deep water sea snail, a marine gastropod mollusk in the family Seguenziidae.

== Distribution ==
This species occurs in deep water in the Atlantic Ocean off Brazil.
