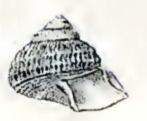
- Drawing with an apertural view of a shell of Ancistrobasis reticulata

Scientific classification
- Kingdom: Animalia
- Phylum: Mollusca
- Class: Gastropoda
- Subclass: Vetigastropoda
- Family: Seguenziidae
- Genus: Ancistrobasis
- Species: A. reticulata

Binomial name
- Ancistrobasis reticulata (Philippi, 1844)

Synonyms
- Ancistrobasis lavaleyei Hoffman & Freiwald, 2017; Gibbula hettematica Locard 1898; Seguenzia reticulata (Philippi, 1844); Solarium reticulatum Philippi, 1844 (original description)

= Ancistrobasis reticulata =

Species of gastropod

Ancistrobasis reticulata is a species of sea snail, a marine gastropod mollusk in the family Seguenziidae.

== Distribution ==
This species occurs in the Gulf of Mexico, off Brazil and in European waters.
