= Basilissopsis regina =

Scientific classification
- Kingdom: Animalia
- Phylum: Mollusca
- Class: Gastropoda
- Subclass: Vetigastropoda
- Superfamily: Seguenzioidea
- Family: Seguenziidae
- Subfamily: Seguenziinae
- Genus: Basilissopsis
- Species: B. regina

Binomial name
- Basilissopsis regina (Marshall, 1983)

Synonyms
- Ancistrobasis regina Marshall, 1983

Species of gastropod

Basilissopsis regina is a species of extremely small deep water sea snail, a marine gastropod mollusk in the family Seguenziidae.

== Distribution ==
This marine species occurs off New Zealand.
