= Galicia Bank =

Seamount in the North Atlantic Ocean

Coordinates: 42.58°N 11.58°W

The Galicia Bank, also known as the Galicia Seamount, is a seamount and ocean-continent transition zone in the North Atlantic Ocean near northwest Spain.

The area is known for its many lifeforms.
