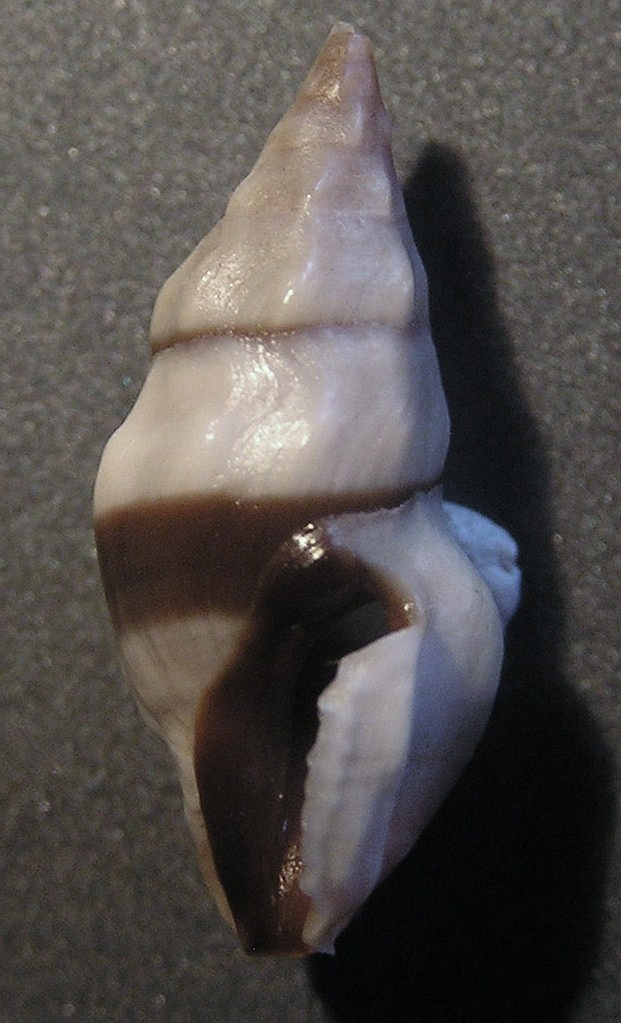
- A shell of Clavus exasperatus

Scientific classification
- Kingdom: Animalia
- Phylum: Mollusca
- Class: Gastropoda
- Subclass: Caenogastropoda
- Order: Neogastropoda
- Superfamily: Conoidea
- Family: Drilliidae
- Genus: Clavus; Montfort, 1810

Type species
- Clavus flammulatus Montfort, 1810

Species
- See text

Synonyms
- Clavicantha Swainson, 1840; Clavus (Tylotiella) Habe, 1958 ·; Drillia (Clavus); Eldridgea Bartsch, 1934; Pleurotoma (Clavus) Montfort, 1810; Tylotia Melvill, 1917; Tylotiella Habe, 1958

= Clavus (gastropod) =

Genus of gastropods

Clavus is a genus of small sea snails, marine gastropod mollusks in the family Drilliidae.

== Description ==
Apart from the general characteristics of the genera in the family Drilliidae, the species in the genus Clavus have a shell with peripheral tubercles, spines or wing-like processes. The aperture is rather large. The outer lip is produced below the sinus.

The shell of Clavus is characterised by the following features:— Flat indefinite fasciole, indicated only by the curve of growth lines. A smooth subulate protoconch. An insinuation of the outer lip, near the base, like that of Strombus. A major sculpture of prominent arched scales on the shoulder, and a minor sculpture of dense, microscopic, waved, spiral striae.

Most species in this genus have a dorsal varix. But this is absent in a few species such as Clavus beckii, Clavus humilis and Clavus pica.

G.W. Tryon correctly preserved the genus for smooth specimens with a short body whorl, long spire, nodulous shoulder, no spiral sculpture, a wide, deep anal sulcus adjacent to the suture and, in the completely adult, a marked subsutural callus on the body.

== Distribution ==
The species in this genus occur in the Red Sea, In the Indian Ocean off Mozambique; also off Indonesia, New Caledonia, Papua New Guinea, the Philippines, Solomon Islands, Japan and Australia (New South Wales, Northern Territory, Queensland, Western Australia).

== Species ==
According to the World Register of Marine Species (WoRMS) the following species with valid names are included within the genus Clavus :

- Clavus aenigmaticus Wells, 1991
- Clavus aglaia (Dall, 1918)
- Clavus alboroseus Horro, Gori, Rosado & Rolán, 2021
- Clavus albotuberculatus (Schepman, 1889)
- Clavus andreolbrichi Fedosov & Puillandre, 2020
- Clavus androyensis (Bozzetti, 2007)
- Clavus angulatus Stahlschmidt, Poppe & Tagaro, 2018
- Clavus basipunctatus (Kilburn, 1988)
- Clavus beckii (Reeve, 1842)
- Clavus berenice (Dall, 1918) (synonym: Clavus spinosa Smith, E.A., 1882 )
- Clavus biancae (Bozzetti, 2008)
- Clavus bilineatus (Reeve, 1845)
- Clavus boucheti Kilburn, Fedosov & Kantor, 2014
- Clavus brianmayi Fedosov & Puillandre, 2020
- Clavus burnupi (G. B. Sowerby III, 1897)
- Clavus cadenasi (Clench & Aguayo, 1939)
- Clavus canalicularis (Röding, 1798)
- Clavus candens (Smith E. A., 1879)
- Clavus cantharis (Reeve, 1845)
- Clavus clara (Reeve, 1845)
- Clavus clavata (Sowerby II, 1870)
- Clavus cloveri (Poppe, Tagaro & Goto, 2018)
- Clavus coffea (Smith E. A., 1882)
- Clavus cygneus (Melvill & Standen, 1897)
- Clavus davidgilmouri Fedosov & Puillandre, 2020
- Clavus delphineae Kilburn, Fedosov & Kantor, 2014
- Clavus devexistriatus Kilburn, Fedosov & Kantor, 2014
- Clavus dolichurus Stahlschmidt, Poppe & Tagaro, 2018
- Clavus dubrucqueae T. Cossignani, 2021
- Clavus ebur (Reeve, 1845)
- Clavus exasperatus (Reeve, 1843)
- Clavus exilis (Pease, 1868)
- Clavus falcicosta (Barnard, 1958)
- Clavus flammulatus Montfort, 1810
- Clavus formosus (Reeve, 1846)
- Clavus fulvus (Hinds, 1843)
- Clavus fusconitens (Sowerby III, 1901)
- Clavus glaucozona Kilburn & Dekker, 2008
- Clavus groschi Kilburn, 1988
- Clavus herberti (Kilburn, 1988)
- Clavus heryi (Bozzetti, 2007)
- Clavus hewittae Wells, 1991
- Clavus hottentotus (E. A. Smith, 1882)
- Clavus humilis (E. A. Smith, 1879)
- Clavus hylikos Kilburn, Fedosov & Kantor, 2014
- Clavus idae (Poppe, Tagaro & Goto, 2018)
- Clavus infrafusca (G.B. Sowerby III, 1893)
- Clavus infuscatus Kilburn & Dekker, 2008
- Clavus isibopho (Kilburn, 1988)
- Clavus isowai Poppe, Tagaro & Goto, 2018
- Clavus japonicus (Lischke, 1869)
- Clavus johnsoni (Bartsch, 1934)
- Clavus juani Horro, Gori, Rosado & Rolán, 2021
- Clavus kirkhammetti Fedosov & Puillandre, 2020
- Clavus laetus (Hinds, 1843)
- Clavus lamberti (Montrouzier, 1860)
- Clavus maestratii Kilburn, Fedosov & Kantor, 2014
- Clavus malva (Morassi, 1998)
- Clavus minutissimus Stahlschmidt, Poppe & Tagaro, 2018
- Clavus moquinianus (Montrouzier, 1874)
- Clavus nodifera (Pease, 1860)
- Clavus nodulosa (Pease, 1863)
- Clavus obliquatus (Reeve, 1845)
- Clavus obliquicostatus (Reeve, 1845)
- Clavus occiduus Wells, 1991
- Clavus papilio (Kilburn, 1988)
- Clavus paroeca (Melvill, 1923)
- Clavus particolor Stahlschmidt, Poppe & Tagaro, 2018
- Clavus peristera Melvill, 1927
- Clavus pica (Reeve, 1843)
- Clavus picoides Kilburn, Fedosov & Kantor, 2014
- Clavus powelli Kay, 1979
- Clavus protentus Hervier, 1896
- Clavus pulicarius Wells, 1991
- Clavus pusilla (Garrett, 1873)
- Clavus putillus (Reeve, 1845)
- Clavus quadratus (Kilburn, 1988)
- Clavus rissoiniformis Kay, 1979
- Clavus roseofuscus (Bozzetti, 2007)
- Clavus rugizonatus Hervier, 1896
- Clavus sacra (Reeve, L.A., 1845)
- Clavus similis Stahlschmidt, Poppe & Tagaro, 2018
- Clavus squamiferus Kilburn, Fedosov & Kantor, 2014
- Clavus subobliquatus (E. A. Smith, 1879)
- Clavus subtilifasciatus Horro, Gori, Rosado & Rolán, 2021
- Clavus suduirauti Bozzetti, 1997
- Clavus sulekile (Kilburn, 1988)
- Clavus triantoniorum Horro, Gori, Rosado & Rolán, 2021
- Clavus unizonalis (Lamarck, 1822)
- Clavus velcolorum Horro, Gori, Rosado & Rolán, 2021
- Clavus vibicinus (Helbling, 1779)
- Clavus virginieae Kilburn, Fedosov & Kantor, 2014
- Clavus wilmeri (Smith E. A., 1879)

Species brought into synonymy

- Clavus abdera (Dall, 1919): synonym of Crassispira abdera (Dall, 1919)
- Clavus aeneus (Hedley, 1922): synonym of Antiguraleus aeneus (Hedley, 1922)
- Clavus alabaster (Reeve, 1843): synonym of Inquisitor alabaster (Reeve, 1843)
- Clavus auriculifera Lamarck, J.B.P.A. de, 1816: synonym of Clavus canalicularis (Röding, 1798)
- Clavus candidulus Hedley, 1922: synonym of Splendrillia candidulus (Hedley, 1922)
- Clavus costatus Hedley, 1922: synonym of Graciliclava costata (Hedley, 1922)
- Clavus crassa (E.A. Smith, 1888): synonym of Clavus aglaia (Dall, 1918)
- Clavus enna (Dall, 1918): synonym of Drillia enna (Dall, 1918)
- Clavus filicinctus (E. A. Smith, 1882): synonym of Horaiclavus filicinctus (E. A. Smith, 1882)
- Clavus flavidulus (Lamarck, 1822): synonym of Clathrodrillia flavidula (Lamarck, 1822)
- Clavus flexus Shuto, 1983: synonym of Plagiostropha flexus (Shuto, 1983)
- Clavus gibberulus Hervier, 1896 : synonym of Drillia gibberulus (Hervier, 1896)
- Clavus inclinata (Sowerby III, 1893): synonym of Iredalea inclinata (Sowerby III, 1893)
- Clavus lacertosus (Hedley, 1922): synonym of Bathytoma lacertosus Hedley, 1922
- Clavus leforestieri Hervier, 1896: synonym of Clavus obliquicostatus (Reeve, 1845)
- Clavus maravignae (Bivona Ant. in Bivona And., 1838): synonym of Crassopleura maravignae (Bivona Ant. in Bivona And., 1838)
- Clavus mighelsi Kay, 1979: synonym of Pyrgocythara mighelsi (Kay, 1979)
- Clavus mighelsi of authors: synonym of Clavus humilis (E. A. Smith, 1879)
- Clavus opalus (Reeve, 1845): synonym of Plagiostropha opalus (Reeve, 1845)
- Clavus pseudoprincipalis (Yokoyama, 1920): synonym of Inquisitor pseudoprincipalis (Yokoyama, 1920)
- Clavus pulchellus (Reeve, 1845): synonym of Fenimorea halidorema Schwengel, 1940
- Clavus quintuplex (Melvill, 1927): synonym of Plagiostropha quintuplex Melvill, 1927
- Clavus regius Habe & Murakami, 1970: synonym of Drillia regia (Habe & Murakami, 1970)
- Clavus undatus (Hedley, 1907): synonym of Austroclavus undatus (Hedley, 1907)
- Clavus viduus (Reeve, 1845): synonym of Clavus unizonalis (Lamarck, 1822)

Species inquirenda

- Clavus acuminata : species inquirenda
- Clavus auriculifera Lamarck : species inquirenda

The Indo-Pacific Molluscan Database adds the following species with names in current use :

- Clavus siebenrocki (Sturany, 1903)

Subgenus Clavus

- Clavus intermaculatus (E. A. Smith, 1879)
