= Aenigmaticus =

Aenigmaticus may refer to the following species:

- Nosmips aenigmaticus, a rare fossil primate
- Clavus aenigmaticus, a species of sea snail
- Icosteus aenigmaticus, an odd ray-finned fish of the northern Pacific Ocean
- Pietschellus aenigmaticus, an extinct genus of enigmatic bony fish
- Microlestes aenigmaticus, a species of ground beetle
