= Clavus powelli =

Scientific classification
- Kingdom: Animalia
- Phylum: Mollusca
- Class: Gastropoda
- Subclass: Caenogastropoda
- Order: Neogastropoda
- Superfamily: Conoidea
- Family: Drilliidae
- Genus: Clavus
- Species: C. powelli

Binomial name
- Clavus powelli Kay, 1979

Synonyms
- Clavus (Tylotiella) powelli Kay, 1979

Species of gastropod

Clavus powelli is a species of sea snail, a marine gastropod mollusk in the family Drilliidae.

== Description ==
The shell grows to a length of 6 mm and have an approximate body volume of 0.112 cm^{3}.

They are multicellular organisms with an NHMUK type specimen repository. They have a dextrally coiled body symmetry.

== Distribution ==
This species occurs in the demersal zone of the Eastern Central Pacific Ocean off Hawaii and Fiji.
