= Clavus cadenasi =

Scientific classification
- Kingdom: Animalia
- Phylum: Mollusca
- Class: Gastropoda
- Subclass: Caenogastropoda
- Order: Neogastropoda
- Superfamily: Conoidea
- Family: Drilliidae
- Genus: Clavus
- Species: C. cadenasi

Binomial name
- Clavus cadenasi (Clench & Aguayo, 1939)

Synonyms
- Tylotia cadenasi Clench & Aguayo, 1939

Species of gastropod

Clavus cadenasi, common name Cadena's turrid, is a species of sea snail, a marine gastropod mollusk in the family Drilliidae.

== Description ==
The shell grows to a length of 40 mm.

== Distribution ==
This species occurs in the Caribbean Sea off Cuba.
