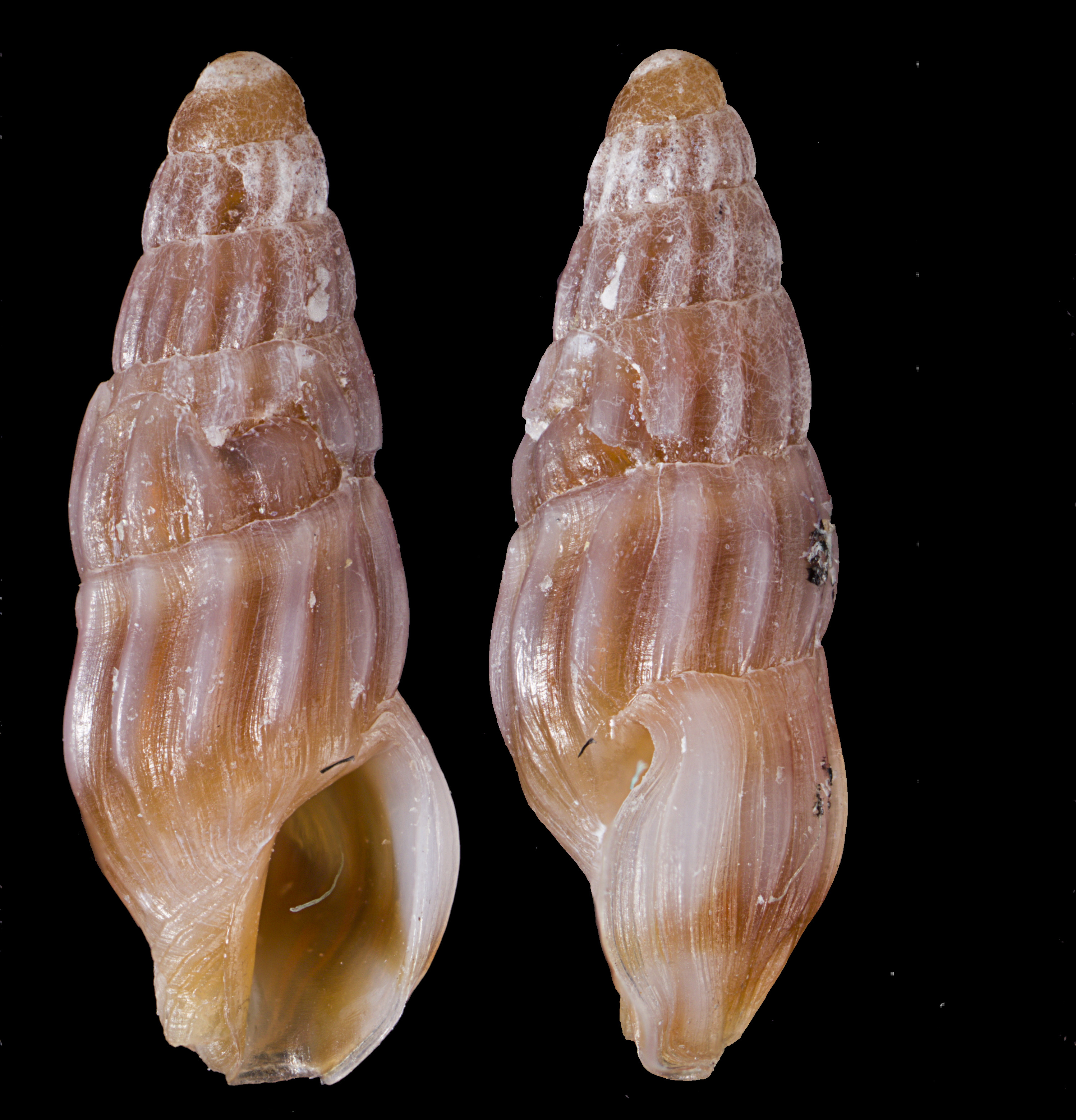
- Shell of Clavus triantoniorum (holotype at MNHN, Paris)

Scientific classification
- Kingdom: Animalia
- Phylum: Mollusca
- Class: Gastropoda
- Subclass: Caenogastropoda
- Order: Neogastropoda
- Superfamily: Conoidea
- Family: Drilliidae
- Genus: Clavus
- Species: C. triantoniorum

Binomial name
- Clavus triantoniorum Horro, Gori, Rosado & Rolán, 2021

= Clavus triantoniorum =

Species of gastropod

Clavus triantoniorum is a species of sea snail, a marine gastropod mollusk in the family Drilliidae.

== Distribution ==
This is a marine species endemic to Oman.
