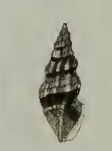
- Original image of a shell of Clavus humilis

Scientific classification
- Kingdom: Animalia
- Phylum: Mollusca
- Class: Gastropoda
- Subclass: Caenogastropoda
- Order: Neogastropoda
- Superfamily: Conoidea
- Family: Drilliidae
- Genus: Clavus
- Species: C. humilis

Binomial name
- Clavus humilis (E.A. Smith, 1879)

Synonyms
- Clavus mighelsi sensu Kay, 1979; Drillia humilis E.A. Smith, 1879; Pleurotoma (Drillia) humilis (E. A. Smith, 1879); Tylotiella humilis (E. A. Smith, 1879)

= Clavus humilis =

Species of gastropod

Clavus humilis is a species of sea snail, a marine gastropod mollusk in the family Drilliidae.

== Description ==
The length of the shell attains 14 mm.

(Original description) The fusiformly ovate shell is chocolate-brown at the base of the whorls and lighter above. It is indistinctly banded with white round their middle, the band being most conspicuous on the ribs, which are also white at their upper extremities. The shell contains 8 whorls. The two apical whorls are smooth, convex, rather large. The rest is considerably excavated above and rather bulgingly convex inferiorly and obliquely ribbed. There are 9 ribs on the penultimate whorl, subobsolete in the concavity at the upper part of the whorl, and again nodulous at the suture. The body whorl shows a transverse series of white dots on the ribs a little below the middle. The; ribs gradually attenuate downwards and do not extend quite to the extreme base. The latter, or cauda, is sculptured with about six oblique fine grooves. The small aperture is brown, white at the sinus and at the termination of the series of dots a little below the middle. The large sinus is deep, rounded, in the concavity, lower sinuation slight. The outer lip is thin, arcuate, produced, with a large tumid varix at a little distance from the margin. The columella is a trifle oblique, coated with a smooth brown callus, adjoining the suture in the form of a tubercle. The siphonal canal is very short, broad, and not recurved.

== Distribution ==
This marine species occurs off the Philippines and Japan.
