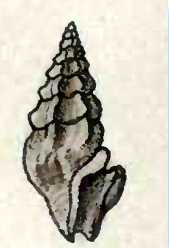
- Drawing of Clavus ebur

Scientific classification
- Kingdom: Animalia
- Phylum: Mollusca
- Class: Gastropoda
- Subclass: Caenogastropoda
- Order: Neogastropoda
- Superfamily: Conoidea
- Family: Drilliidae
- Genus: Clavus
- Species: C. ebur

Binomial name
- Clavus ebur (Reeve, 1845)

Synonyms
- Drillia ebur Reeve, 1845; Plagiostropha ebur (Reeve, 1845); Pleurotoma ebur Reeve, 1845

= Clavus ebur =

Species of gastropod

Clavus ebur is a species of sea snail, a marine gastropod mollusk in the family Drilliidae.

== Description ==
The shell is pure white, strongly nodulosely plicate and obsoletely spirally striate. The length of the shell is 17 mm.

== Distribution ==
This species is found in the demersal zone of tropical waters in the Western Atlantic Ocean.
