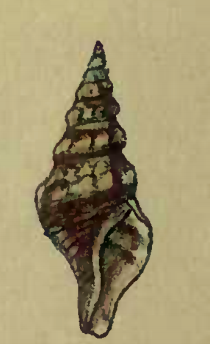
- Drawing of Clavus putilus

Scientific classification
- Kingdom: Animalia
- Phylum: Mollusca
- Class: Gastropoda
- Subclass: Caenogastropoda
- Order: Neogastropoda
- Superfamily: Conoidea
- Family: Drilliidae
- Genus: Clavus
- Species: C. putillus

Binomial name
- Clavus putillus (Reeve, 1845)

Synonyms
- Drillia putillus Reeve, 1845; Pleurotoma albicincta Adams, A. & L.A. Reeve, 1850; Pleurotoma putillus Reeve, 1845

= Clavus putillus =

Species of gastropod

Clavus putillus is a species of sea snail, a marine gastropod mollusk in the family Drilliidae.

== Description ==
The shell grows to a length of 15 mm. The shell is yellowish white, chestnut-tinted between the slight longitudinal ribs. The tuberculate periphery forms a strong angle on the whorls. The lip is simple and thin. The anal sinus is broad and shallow.

== Distribution ==
This species occurs in the demersal zone of tropical Indo-Pacific along the Philippines and in the South China Sea and East China Sea.
