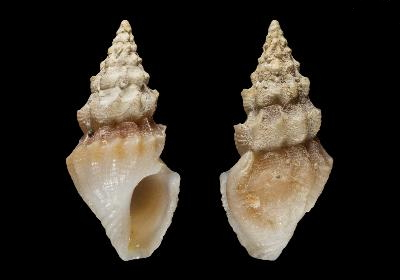
- Shells of Clavus devexistriatus (holotype in the MNHN, Paris)

Scientific classification
- Kingdom: Animalia
- Phylum: Mollusca
- Class: Gastropoda
- Subclass: Caenogastropoda
- Order: Neogastropoda
- Superfamily: Conoidea
- Family: Drilliidae
- Genus: Clavus
- Species: C. devexistriatus

Binomial name
- Clavus devexistriatus Kilburn, Fedosov & Kantor, 2014

= Clavus devexistriatus =

Species of gastropod

Clavus devexistriatus is a species of sea snail, a marine gastropod mollusc in the family Drilliidae.

== Distribution ==
This is a marine species occurs that off New Caledonia and in the Coral Sea.
