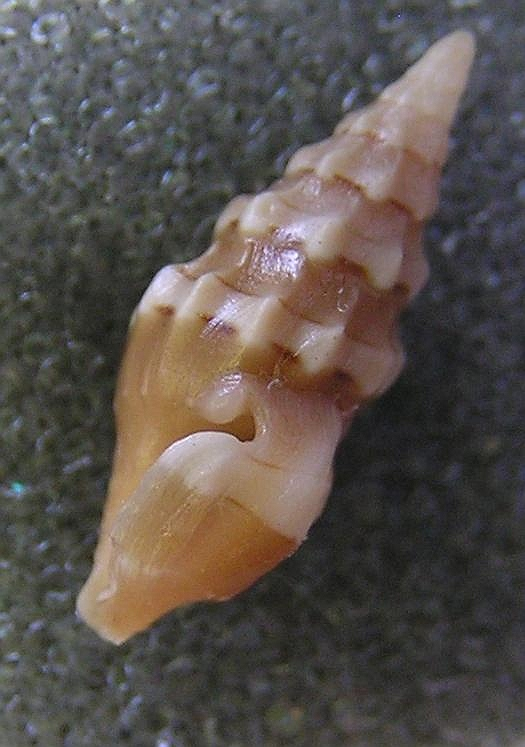
- Apertural view of a shell of Clavus bilineatus

Scientific classification
- Kingdom: Animalia
- Phylum: Mollusca
- Class: Gastropoda
- Subclass: Caenogastropoda
- Order: Neogastropoda
- Superfamily: Conoidea
- Family: Drilliidae
- Genus: Clavus
- Species: C. bilineatus

Binomial name
- Clavus bilineatus (Reeve, 1845)

Synonyms
- Drillia bilineata Reeve, 1845; Pleurotoma bilineata Reeve, 1845 (basionym)

= Clavus bilineatus =

Species of gastropod

Clavus bilineatus is a species of sea snail, a marine gastropod mollusk in the family Drilliidae.

== Description ==
Juvenile

The size of an adult shell varies between 12 mm and 24 mm. G.W. Tryon thought this species to be a synonym of Clavus pulchella (Reeve, 1845) (described as Drillia pulchella). He stated that the differences were only in the tuberculations being less sharp and the color not so bright, with a brownish tinge.

== Distribution ==
This species occurs in the Indo-West Pacific, off the Philippines and Taiwan, and also off Papua New Guinea and Australia (Queensland).
