= Clavus groschi =

Scientific classification
- Kingdom: Animalia
- Phylum: Mollusca
- Class: Gastropoda
- Subclass: Caenogastropoda
- Order: Neogastropoda
- Superfamily: Conoidea
- Family: Drilliidae
- Genus: Clavus
- Species: C. groschi

Binomial name
- Clavus groschi Kilburn, 1988

Species of gastropod

Clavus groschi is a species of sea snail, a marine gastropod mollusk in the family Drilliidae.

== Description ==
The length of the shell attains 22.5 mm, its diameter is 9.5 mm. Characteristic for this claviform shell is that the dark median zone is bordered posteriorly by an interrupted brown line.

== Distribution ==
This species occurs in the demersal zone of the Indian Ocean off Mozambique and Madagascar.
