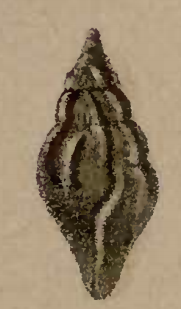
- Drawing of a shell of Clavus beckii

Scientific classification
- Kingdom: Animalia
- Phylum: Mollusca
- Class: Gastropoda
- Subclass: Caenogastropoda
- Order: Neogastropoda
- Superfamily: Conoidea
- Family: Drilliidae
- Genus: Clavus
- Species: C. beckii

Binomial name
- Clavus beckii (Reeve, 1842)

Synonyms
- Drillia beckii Reeve, 1842; Pleurotoma beckii Reeve, 1842

= Clavus beckii =

Species of gastropod

Clavus beckii is a species of sea snail, a marine gastropod mollusk in the family Drilliidae.

== Description ==
The shell is oblong, cylindrically attenuated, sharp at the apex and six-angled. The whorls are longitudinally tuberculated at the angles. The entire shell is olive-brown except the tubercles, which are white. The columella and the interior of the mouth are brown. The siphonal canal is very short.

== Distribution ==
This species occurs in the Pacific Ocean off the Philippines and Indonesia.
