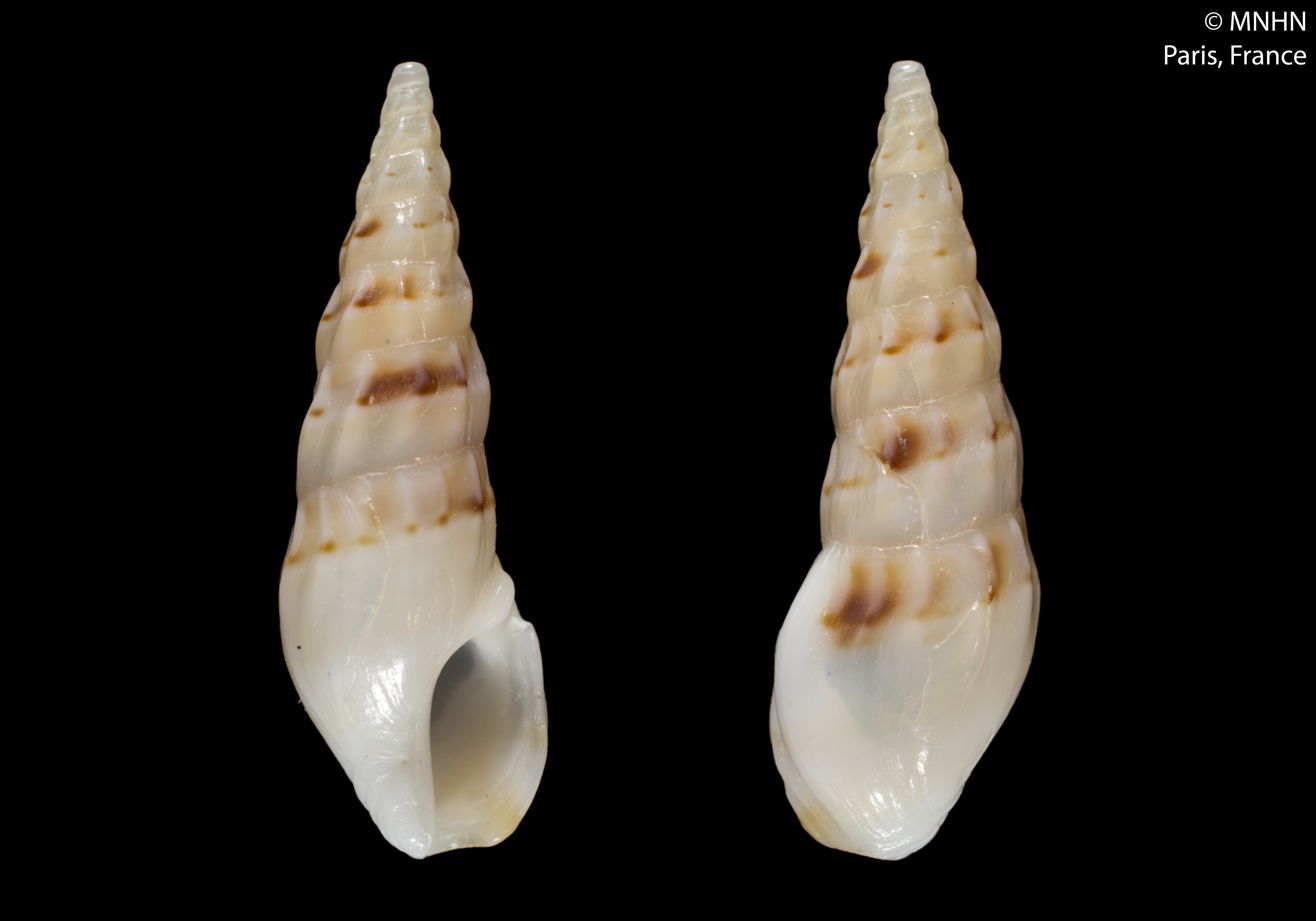
- Shell of Clavus androyensis (holotype at MNHN, Paris)

Scientific classification
- Kingdom: Animalia
- Phylum: Mollusca
- Class: Gastropoda
- Subclass: Caenogastropoda
- Order: Neogastropoda
- Superfamily: Conoidea
- Family: Drilliidae
- Genus: Clavus
- Species: C. androyensis

Binomial name
- Clavus androyensis Bozzetti, 2007

Synonyms
- Tylotiella androyensis Bozzetti, 2007 (original combination)

= Clavus androyensis =

Species of gastropod

Clavus androyensis is a species of sea snail, a marine gastropod mollusc in the family Drilliidae.

== Description ==
The length of the shell attains 12 mm.

== Distribution ==
This marine species occurs off Madagascar.
