= Clavus rissoiniformis =

Scientific classification
- Kingdom: Animalia
- Phylum: Mollusca
- Class: Gastropoda
- Subclass: Caenogastropoda
- Order: Neogastropoda
- Superfamily: Conoidea
- Family: Drilliidae
- Genus: Clavus
- Species: C. rissoiniformis

Binomial name
- Clavus rissoiniformis Kay, 1979

Synonyms
- Tylotiella rissoiniformis (Kay, 1979)

Species of gastropod

Clavus rissoiniformis is a species of sea snail, a marine gastropod mollusk in the family Drilliidae.

== Distribution ==
This marine species occurs in French Polynesia and Hawaii.
