= Clavus vibicinus =

Scientific classification
- Kingdom: Animalia
- Phylum: Mollusca
- Class: Gastropoda
- Subclass: Caenogastropoda
- Order: Neogastropoda
- Superfamily: Conoidea
- Family: Drilliidae
- Genus: Clavus
- Species: C. vibicinus

Binomial name
- Clavus vibicinus (Helbling, 1779)

Synonyms
- Drillia interrupta Lamarck, 1816; Murex vibicinus Helbling, 1779

Species of gastropod

Clavus vibicinus is a species of sea snail, a marine gastropod mollusk in the family Drilliidae.

== Distribution ==
This species occurs in the demersal zone of the tropical Pacific Ocean.
