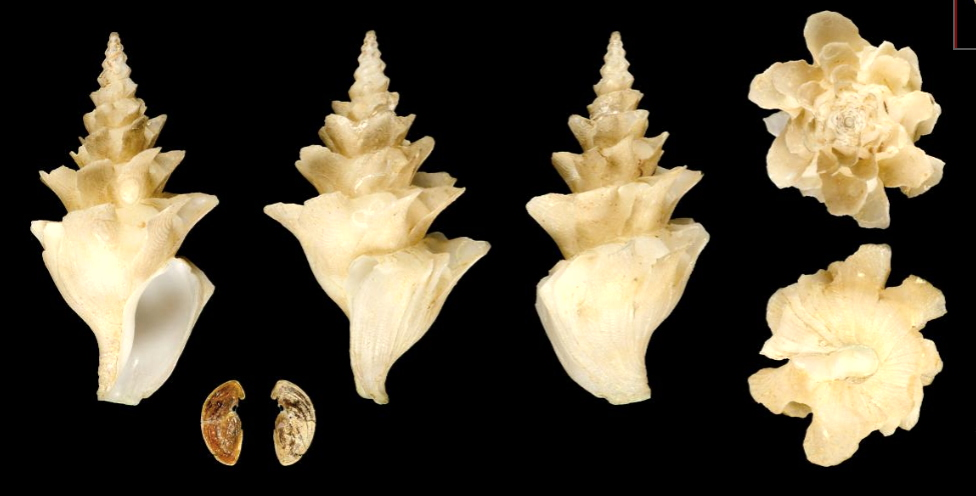
- Shell of Clavus johnsoni (holotype at the Smithsonian Institution)

Scientific classification
- Kingdom: Animalia
- Phylum: Mollusca
- Class: Gastropoda
- Subclass: Caenogastropoda
- Order: Neogastropoda
- Superfamily: Conoidea
- Family: Drilliidae
- Genus: Clavus
- Species: C. johnsoni

Binomial name
- Clavus johnsoni (Bartsch, 1934)

Synonyms
- Clavus (Eldridgea) johnsoni (Bartsch, 1934); Eldridgea johnsoni Bartsch, 1934 (basionym)

= Clavus johnsoni =

Species of gastropod

Clavus johnsoni, common name Johnson's turrid, is a species of sea snail, a marine gastropod mollusk in the family Drilliidae.

== Description ==
The shell grows to a length of 40 mm; its diameter 19.7 mm.

(Original description) The shell is moderately large and ovate. It is horn-colored, with the inside of the alations and the broad basal band white. The interior of the aperture is porcelaneous with a pinkish tinge. A part of the first turn of the protoconch whorl is lost. The remaining protoconch turn appears to be smooth. The early postnuclear whorls are marked by protractively slanting, axial ribs, of which 9 occur upon the first three whorls and 10 upon the fourth. On the first three whorls these axial ribs are quite regular, being strongest on the middle of the whorl and tapering toward the summit and the periphery. The spaces that separate them here are about as wide as the broad ribs. On the fourth teleoconch whorl they begin to be more oblique and tend toward the formation of a lamina at the tip. This becomes accentuated on the fifth whorl, and on the succeeding whorls it becomes increasingly more pronounced, gradually forming the broad winglike expansion that characterizes this species. There are 10 ribs on the fifth and sixth, 8 upon the seventh to ninth, and 12 upon the body whorl. These alations are marked by incremental lines, and their outside, as well as the base and columella, are crossed by slender, wavy, spiral threads. The insides of the alations are smooth, barring incremental lines. The aperture is moderately large and expanded, decidedly channeled anteriorly and at the posterior angle. The outer lip is thin, protracted between the posterior channel and slender stromboid notch anteriorly. The inner lip is reflected over the somewhat twisted columella as a heavy callus, which extends over the parietal wall and forms a slight lump near the posterior angle.

== Distribution ==
This species occurs in the benthic zone of the Caribbean Sea off Puerto Rico.at depths between 329 m to 457 m; also off Guadeloupe.
