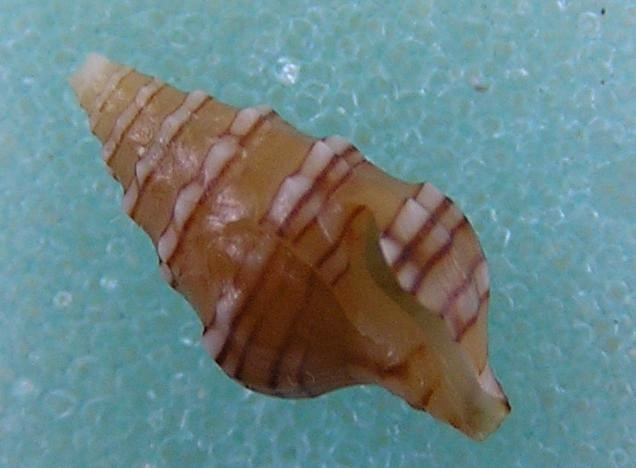
- Apertural view of a shell of Clavus lamberti

Scientific classification
- Kingdom: Animalia
- Phylum: Mollusca
- Class: Gastropoda
- Subclass: Caenogastropoda
- Order: Neogastropoda
- Superfamily: Conoidea
- Family: Drilliidae
- Genus: Clavus
- Species: C. lamberti

Binomial name
- Clavus lamberti (Montrouzier, 1860)

Synonyms
- Drillia lamberti Montrouzier, 1860; Drillia (Clavus) lamberti (Montrouzier, 1860); Drillia lauta Pease, W.H., 1867; Pleurotoma lamberti Montrouzier, 1860; Pleurotoma (Drillia) lamberti Montrouzier, 1860; Pleurotoma mariei Crosse, 1869

= Clavus lamberti =

Species of gastropod

Clavus lamberti is a species of sea snail, a marine gastropod mollusk in the family Drilliidae.

== Description ==
The size of an adult shell varies between 8 mm and 20 mm. The shell is yellowish brown, with a central reddish chestnut band, filled with a double series of revolving white-tipped tubercles. Below this, on the body whorl, there is a second narrower band, bearing a single series of small white tubercles, a brown line and spots at the base.

== Distribution ==
This species occurs in the demersal zone of the tropical Indo-Pacific off East Africa, the Philippines, Papua New Guinea, Australia (Northern Territory, Queensland, Western Australia), New Caledonia, and Polynesia.
