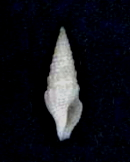
- Apertural view of a shell of Clavus peristera (museum specimen at Naturalis Biodiversity Center)

Scientific classification
- Kingdom: Animalia
- Phylum: Mollusca
- Class: Gastropoda
- Subclass: Caenogastropoda
- Order: Neogastropoda
- Superfamily: Conoidea
- Family: Drilliidae
- Genus: Clavus
- Species: C. peristera

Binomial name
- Clavus peristera Melvill, J.C., 1927

Synonyms
- Pleurotoma (Clavus) peristera Melvill, 1927; Turris (Clavus) peristera Melvill, 1927

= Clavus peristera =

Species of gastropod

Clavus peristera is a species of sea snail, a marine gastropod mollusk in the family Drilliidae.

== Distribution ==
This marine species occurs in the Pacific Ocean off Gorgona Island, Colombia.
