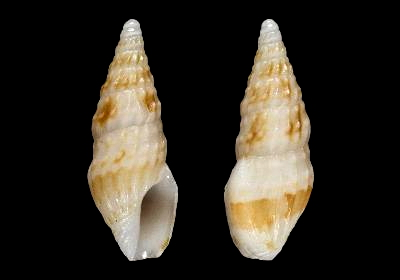
- Shell of Clavus picoides (holotype at MNHN, Paris)

Scientific classification
- Kingdom: Animalia
- Phylum: Mollusca
- Class: Gastropoda
- Subclass: Caenogastropoda
- Order: Neogastropoda
- Superfamily: Conoidea
- Family: Drilliidae
- Genus: Clavus
- Species: C. picoides

Binomial name
- Clavus picoides Kilburn, Fedosov & Kantor, 2014

= Clavus picoides =

Species of gastropod

Clavus picoides is a species of sea snail, a marine gastropod mollusc in the family Drilliidae.

== Description ==
The length of the shell attains 8.7 millimetres (0.34 in).

It is a long, kind of tapered cone with many ridges and a spiral. A small hole at the bottom

is the nook in which the sea snail inhabits.

== Distribution ==
This is a marine species occurs off New Caledonia.
