= Clavus herberti =

Scientific classification
- Kingdom: Animalia
- Phylum: Mollusca
- Class: Gastropoda
- Subclass: Caenogastropoda
- Order: Neogastropoda
- Superfamily: Conoidea
- Family: Drilliidae
- Genus: Clavus
- Species: C. herberti

Binomial name
- Clavus herberti (Kilburn, 1988)

Synonyms
- Tylotiella herberti Kilburn, 1988 (original combination)

Species of gastropod

Clavus herberti is a species of sea snail, a marine gastropod mollusk in the family Drilliidae.

== Description ==
The length of the brownish orange shell attains 16.4 mm, its diameter 6.1 mm. The strongly patterned, claviform shell has a rather low spire and a proportionally large and blunt protoconch. It shows fine and numerous spiral threads.

== Distribution ==
This marine species occurs off East London - KwaZulu-Natal, South Africa.
