= Clavus basipunctatus =

Scientific classification
- Kingdom: Animalia
- Phylum: Mollusca
- Class: Gastropoda
- Subclass: Caenogastropoda
- Order: Neogastropoda
- Superfamily: Conoidea
- Family: Drilliidae
- Genus: Clavus
- Species: C. basipunctatus

Binomial name
- Clavus basipunctatus Wells, 1991

Synonyms
- Tylotiella basipunctata Kilburn, 1988 (original combination)

Species of gastropod

Clavus basipunctatus is a species of sea snail, a marine gastropod mollusk in the family Drilliidae.

== Description ==
The length of an adult shell varies between 7.4 and 12.5 mm (0.29 and 0.49 in). The whorls are not shouldered. The axial ribs do not undulate on base. The spiral threads are microscopic or absent, except on the rostrum. The terminal varix is strong. The subsutural region is not contrastingly dark. The base of the body whorl shows a row of weak white pustules.

== Distribution ==
This marine species occurs off in the Indian Ocean off Mozambique
