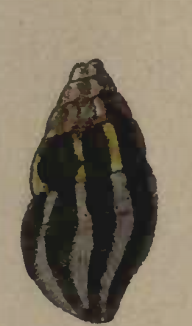
- Drawing of Clavus cantharis

Scientific classification
- Kingdom: Animalia
- Phylum: Mollusca
- Class: Gastropoda
- Subclass: Caenogastropoda
- Order: Neogastropoda
- Superfamily: Conoidea
- Family: Drilliidae
- Genus: Clavus
- Species: C. cantharis

Binomial name
- Clavus cantharis (Reeve, 1845)

Synonyms
- Drillia cantharis Reeve, 1845; Pleurotoma cantharis Reeve, 1845 (original combination); Pleurotoma scarabaeus Reeve, 1846

= Clavus cantharis =

Species of gastropod

Clavus cantharis is a species of sea snail, a marine gastropod mollusk in the family Drilliidae.

== Description ==
The shell grows to a length of 11 mm. The smooth, obtusely ovate shell is thick and solid. Its color is very dark brown, the nodules are whitish. The whorls are oblique and nodosely plicated round the middle. The anal sinus is rather large.

== Distribution ==
This marine species occurs in the Indo-Pacific Region, off the Philippines.
