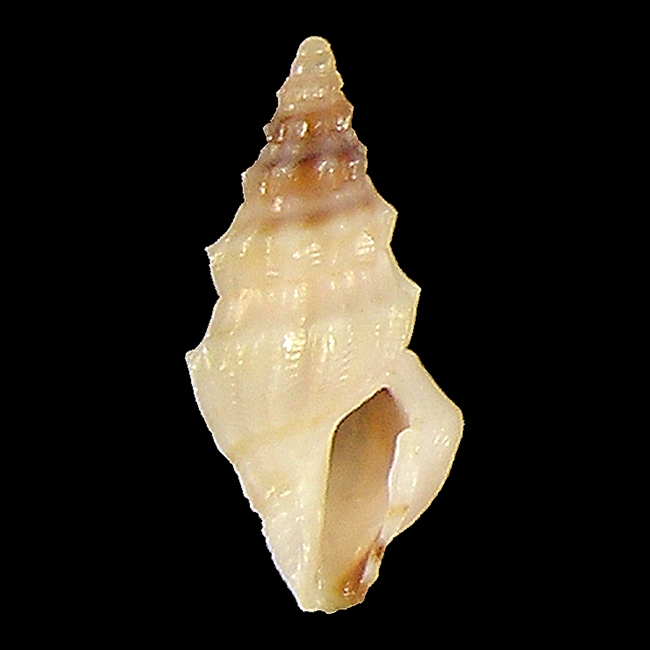

Scientific classification
- Kingdom: Animalia
- Phylum: Mollusca
- Class: Gastropoda
- Subclass: Caenogastropoda
- Order: Neogastropoda
- Superfamily: Conoidea
- Family: Drilliidae
- Genus: Clavus
- Species: C. minutissimus

Binomial name
- Clavus minutissimus Stahlschmidt, Poppe & Tagaro, 2018

= Clavus minutissimus =

Species of gastropod

Clavus minutissimus is a species of sea snail, a marine gastropoda mollusk in the family Drilliidae.

== Description ==
The length of the shell attains 7.2 mm.

== Distribution ==
This marine species occurs off the Philippines.
