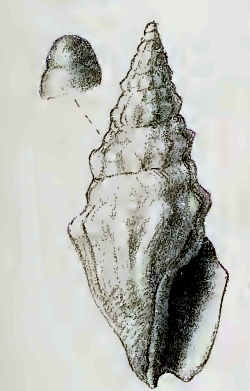
- Original image of the protoconch and shell of Clavus paroeca

Scientific classification
- Kingdom: Animalia
- Phylum: Mollusca
- Class: Gastropoda
- Subclass: Caenogastropoda
- Order: Neogastropoda
- Superfamily: Conoidea
- Family: Drilliidae
- Genus: Clavus
- Species: C. paroeca

Binomial name
- Clavus paroeca (Melvill, 1923)

Synonyms
- Drillia paroeca Melvill, 1923

= Clavus paroeca =

Species of gastropod

Clavus paroeca is a species of sea snail, a marine gastropod mollusk in the family Drilliidae.

== Description ==
The length of the shell attains 19 mm, its diameter 7 mm.

(Original description) The solid shell has an abbreviately fusiform shape. It is white, the basal third of the body whorl is ochreous. It contains 9 whorls, including the smooth and globular protoconch. The remainder are longitudinally many-ribbed., These ribs are stout, angled, and echinate, crossed by many faint revolving lines. The body whorl is ten-ribbed. The aperture is oblong. The outer lip is slightly expanded. The columellar margin is almost straight. The wide siphonal canal is abbreviate. The sinus is well expressed, wide, and fairly deep.

== Distribution ==
This species occurs in the demersal zone of the tropical Indo-Pacific; also off Brunei.
