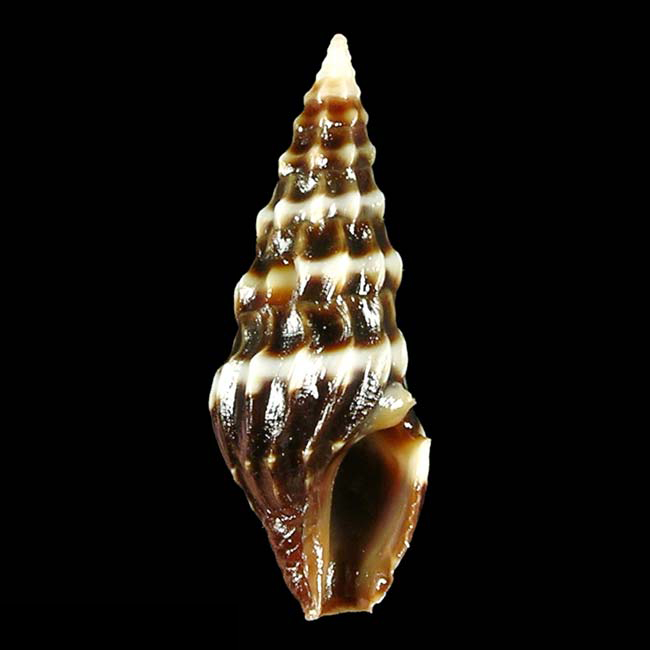

Scientific classification
- Kingdom: Animalia
- Phylum: Mollusca
- Class: Gastropoda
- Subclass: Caenogastropoda
- Order: Neogastropoda
- Superfamily: Conoidea
- Family: Drilliidae
- Genus: Clavus
- Species: C. isowai

Binomial name
- Clavus isowai Poppe, Tagaro & Goto, 2018

= Clavus isowai =

Species of gastropod

Clavus isowai is a species of sea snail, a marine gastropoda mollusk in the family Drilliidae.

== Original description ==
- Poppe G.T., Tagaro S.P. & Goto Y. (2018). New marine species from the Central Philippines. Visaya. 5(1): 91-135 page(s): 105, pl. 9 figs 4-5.
