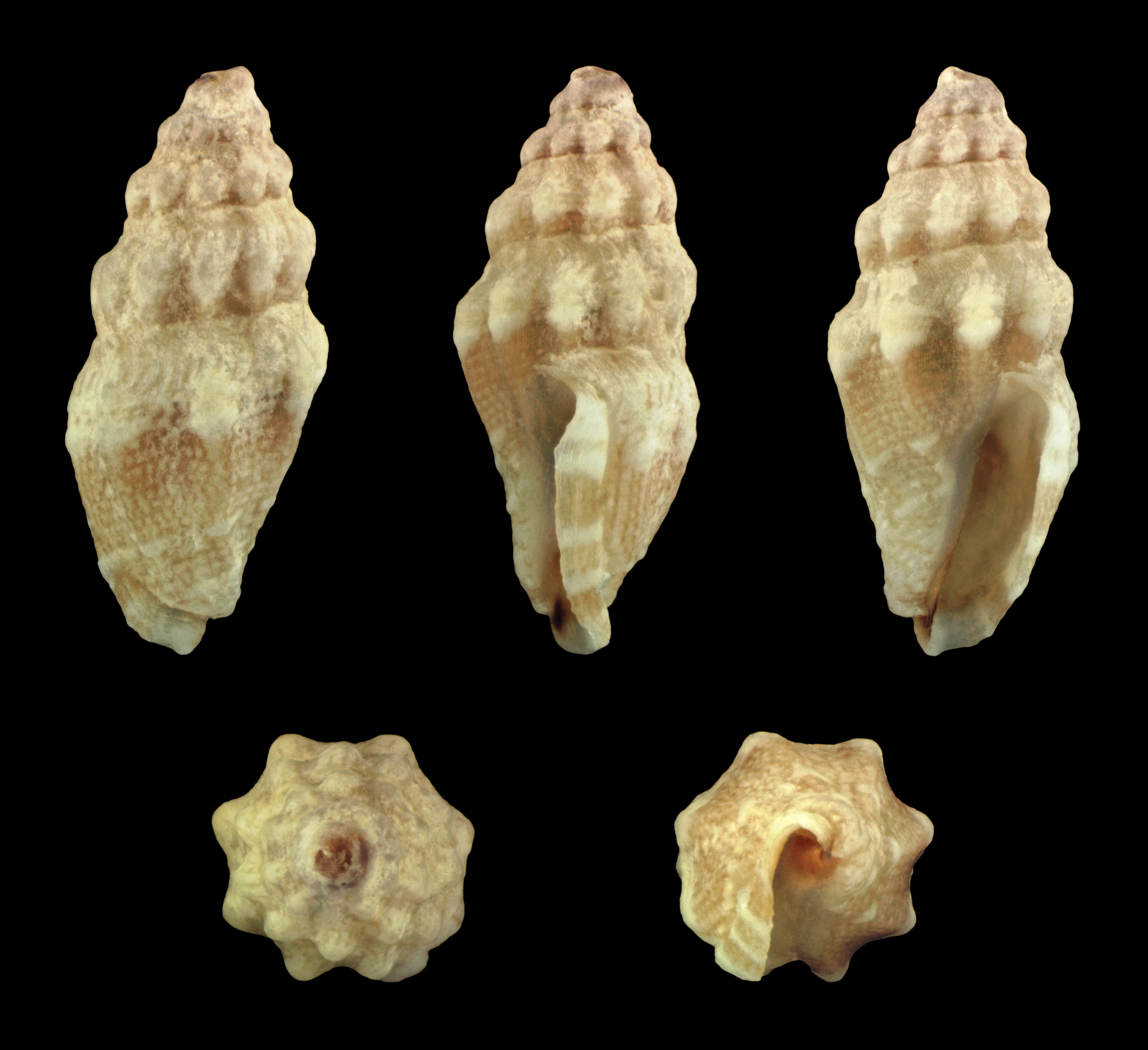

Scientific classification
- Kingdom: Animalia
- Phylum: Mollusca
- Class: Gastropoda
- Subclass: Caenogastropoda
- Order: Neogastropoda
- Superfamily: Conoidea
- Family: Drilliidae
- Genus: Clavus
- Species: C. nodifera

Binomial name
- Clavus nodifera (Pease, 1860)

Synonyms
- Drillia nodifera Pease, 1860

= Clavus nodifera =

Species of gastropod

Clavus nodifera is a species of sea snail, a marine gastropod mollusk in the family Drilliidae.

This species is also mentioned as Clavus nodiferus.

== Distribution ==
This species occurs in the demersal zone of the Central Pacific Ocean off Hawaii.
