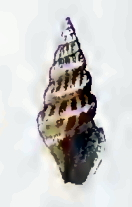
- Original image of a shell of Clavus subobliquatus

Scientific classification
- Kingdom: Animalia
- Phylum: Mollusca
- Class: Gastropoda
- Subclass: Caenogastropoda
- Order: Neogastropoda
- Superfamily: Conoidea
- Family: Drilliidae
- Genus: Clavus
- Species: C. subobliquatus

Binomial name
- Clavus subobliquatus (E.A. Smith, 1879)

Synonyms
- Drillia subobliquata E.A. Smith, 1879 (original combination); Tylotiella subobliquata (E. A. Smith, 1879)

= Clavus subobliquatus =

Species of gastropod

Clavus subobliquatus is a species of sea snail, a marine gastropod mollusk in the family Drilliidae.

== Description ==
The length of the shell varies between 5 mm and 25 mm.

(Original description) The shell has an acuminately ovate shape. Its color is light brown, with a narrow white zone a little below the middle of the whorls, and a second, less distinct and subinterrupted one a little below the middle of the body whorl. The shell contains 9 whorls, of which 2 convex, white, smooth whorls in the protoconch. These are concave at top, thin, convex at the sides, obliquely costated and finely transversely lirated. The costae are rather fine, 14 on the penultimate whorl, subnodose a little above the middle, where the concavity of the whorl commences, attenuated at the upper extremity, and becoming obsolete about the middle of the body whorl. The spiral lirae are not conspicuous, rather far apart, and are not found in the excavation at the upper part of the volutions. The aperture is small, occupying rather more than a third of the entire length. The anal sinus is deep. The inferior sinuation is very shallow. The siphonal canal is very wide and not recurved. The columella is covered with a pale brownish callosity and tuberculated at the upper extremity.

== Distribution ==
This marine species occurs off Japan, Taiwan and Réunion.
