= Clavus quadratus =

Scientific classification
- Kingdom: Animalia
- Phylum: Mollusca
- Class: Gastropoda
- Subclass: Caenogastropoda
- Order: Neogastropoda
- Superfamily: Conoidea
- Family: Drilliidae
- Genus: Clavus
- Species: C. quadratus

Binomial name
- Clavus quadratus Kilburn, 1988

Synonyms
- Tylotiella quadrata Kilburn, 1988 (original combination)

Species of gastropod

Clavus quadratus is a species of sea snail, a marine gastropod mollusk in the family Drilliidae.

== Description ==
The spire of the claviform, light brown shell is rather low, its protoconch large and rather blunt. The whorls are rather convex, lacking an angle or shoulder. The shell is sculptured overall by raised spiral threads. The body whorl is rather quadrate. The aperture is oblong. The wide siphonal canal is rather short. The columella is straight. The anal sinus is deep and wide.

== Distribution ==
This marine species occurs off East Transkei, South Africa
