= Clavus suduirauti =

Scientific classification
- Kingdom: Animalia
- Phylum: Mollusca
- Class: Gastropoda
- Subclass: Caenogastropoda
- Order: Neogastropoda
- Superfamily: Conoidea
- Family: Drilliidae
- Genus: Clavus
- Species: C. suduirauti

Binomial name
- Clavus suduirauti Bozzetti, 1997

Species of gastropod

Clavus suduirauti is a species of sea snail, a marine gastropod mollusk in the family Drilliidae.

== Description ==
The length of the shell attains 25 mm.

== Distribution ==
This species occurs in the demersal zone in the Pacific Ocean off the Philippines.
