= Clavus clara =

Scientific classification
- Kingdom: Animalia
- Phylum: Mollusca
- Class: Gastropoda
- Subclass: Caenogastropoda
- Order: Neogastropoda
- Superfamily: Conoidea
- Family: Drilliidae
- Genus: Clavus
- Species: C. clara

Binomial name
- Clavus clara (Reeve, 1845)

Synonyms
- Mangilia clara Reeve, 1845; Pleurotoma clara Reeve, 1845

Species of gastropod

Clavus clara is a species of sea snail, a marine gastropod mollusk in the family Drilliidae.

== Description ==
The shell is smooth, plicately ribbed and round shouldered. The color of the shell is purple brown and the upper part of the whorls is whitish. The length of the shell is 15 mm.

== Distribution ==
This species is found in the demersal zone of tropical waters in the Indo-Pacific.
