= Clavus pulicarius =

Scientific classification
- Kingdom: Animalia
- Phylum: Mollusca
- Class: Gastropoda
- Subclass: Caenogastropoda
- Order: Neogastropoda
- Superfamily: Conoidea
- Family: Drilliidae
- Genus: Clavus
- Species: C. pulicarius

Binomial name
- Clavus pulicarius Wells, 1991

Species of gastropod

Clavus pulicarius is a species of sea snail, a marine gastropod mollusk in the family Drilliidae.

== Distribution ==
This marine species is endemic to Australia and occurs in the demersal zone of Western Australia.
