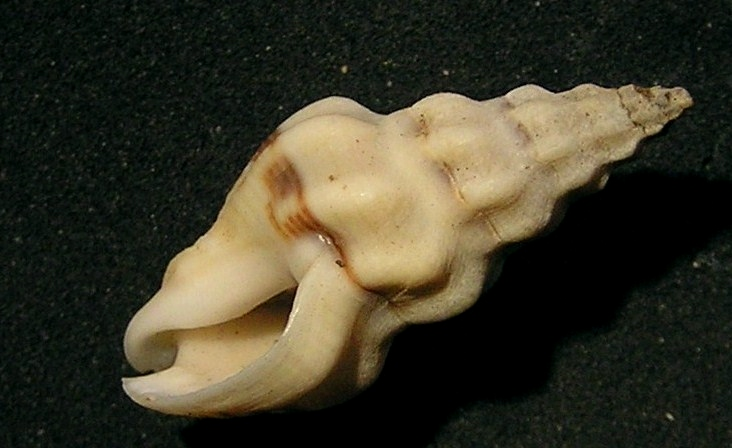
- Apertural view of a shell of Clavus unizonalis

Scientific classification
- Kingdom: Animalia
- Phylum: Mollusca
- Class: Gastropoda
- Subclass: Caenogastropoda
- Order: Neogastropoda
- Superfamily: Conoidea
- Family: Drilliidae
- Genus: Clavus
- Species: C. unizonalis

Binomial name
- Clavus unizonalis (Lamarck, 1822)

Synonyms
- Clavus protentus Hervier, R.P.J., 1896; Clavus viduus (Reeve, 1845); Drillia unizonalis (Lamarck, 1822); Drillia vidualoides Garrett, 1873; Pleurotoma (Clavus) nigrozonata Weinkauff, 1876 · accepted, alternate representation; Pleurotoma nigrozonata Weinkauff, 1876; Pleurotoma unizonalis Lamarck, 1822; Pleurotoma vidua Reeve, L.A., 1845

= Clavus unizonalis =

Species of gastropod

Clavus unizonalis, common name the one-zoned turrid, is a species of sea snail, a marine gastropod mollusk in the family Drilliidae.

== Description ==
The size of an adult shell varies between 15 mm and 26 mm. The shell is nodosely plicate, smooth, or with a few close revolving lines at the base. The color is whitish or yellowish white, the body whorl below the periphery chocolate, sometimes with a white band at the base. The color of the interior is chocolate, with an irregular white superior band.

== Distribution ==
This species occurs in the Red Sea, off northern Mozambique and in the demersal zone of the tropical Indo-Pacific off Mozambique, Japan, the Philippines, Indonesia, Papua New Guinea, the Solomon Islands, New Caledonia and the Loyalty Islands; also off Australia (Northern Territory, Queensland and Western Australia).

It has also been found in Pliocene strata of Papua New Guinea (age range: 5.332 to 2.588 Ma)
