= Clavus malva =

Scientific classification
- Kingdom: Animalia
- Phylum: Mollusca
- Class: Gastropoda
- Subclass: Caenogastropoda
- Order: Neogastropoda
- Superfamily: Conoidea
- Family: Drilliidae
- Genus: Clavus
- Species: C. malva

Binomial name
- Clavus malva (Morassi, 1998)

Synonyms
- Tylotiella malva Morassi, 1998

Species of gastropod

Tylotiella malva is a species of sea snail, a marine gastropod mollusk in the family Drilliidae.

== Description ==
The length of the shell attains 30 mm.

== Distribution ==
This marine species occurs in the Gulf of Aden and off Somalia.
