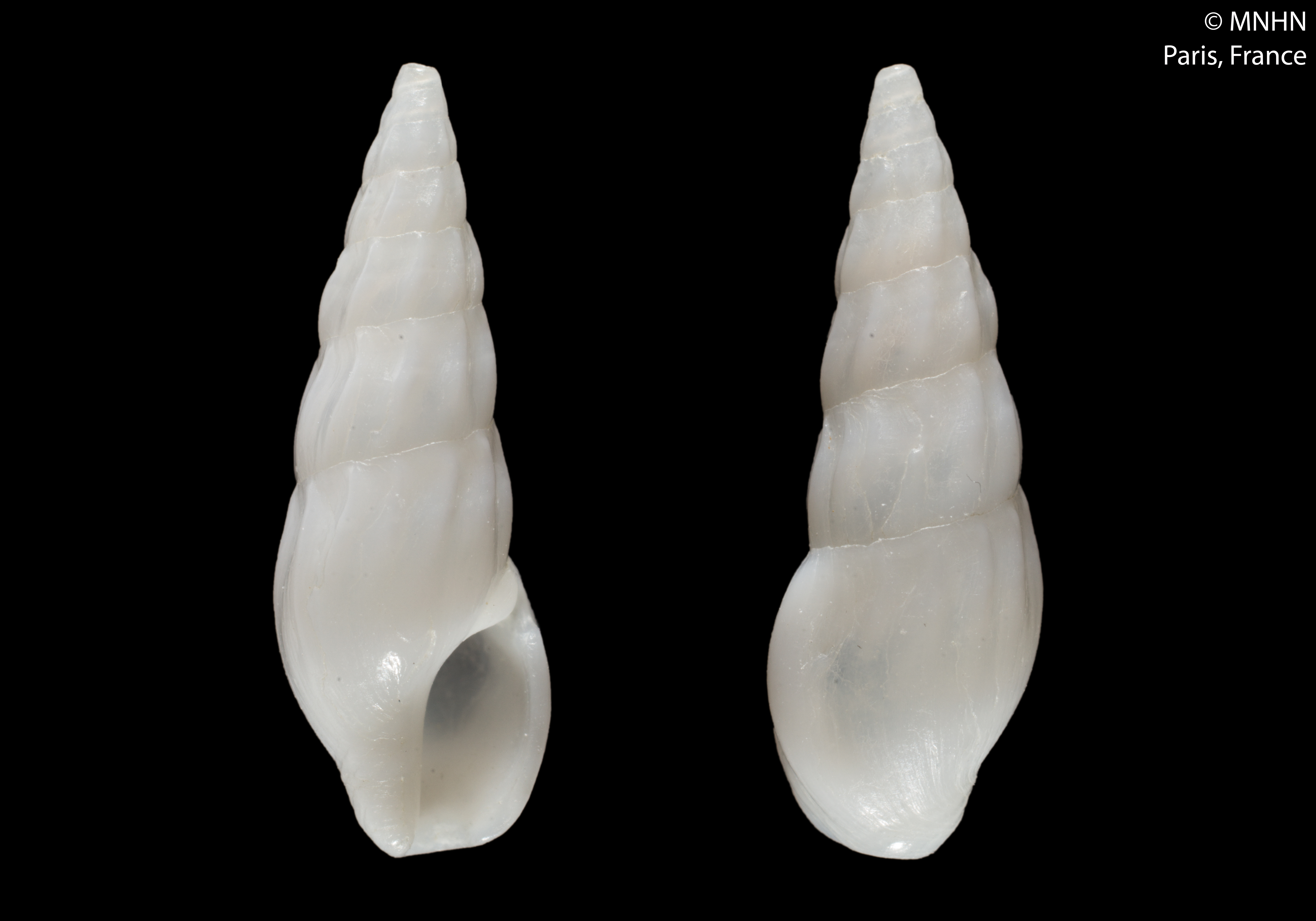
- Shell of Clavus biancae (holotype at MNHN, Paris)

Conservation status
- Data Deficient (IUCN 3.1)

Scientific classification
- Kingdom: Animalia
- Phylum: Mollusca
- Class: Gastropoda
- Subclass: Caenogastropoda
- Order: Neogastropoda
- Superfamily: Conoidea
- Family: Drilliidae
- Genus: Clavus
- Species: C. biancae

Binomial name
- Clavus biancae (Bozzetti, 2008)

Synonyms
- Tylotiella biancae Bozzetti, 2008 (original combination)

= Clavus biancae =

Species of gastropod

Clavus biancae is a species of sea snail, a marine gastropod mollusk in the family Drilliidae.

== Description ==
The length of the shell attains 11 millimetres (0.43 in).

== Distribution ==
This marine species occurs off Madagascar.
