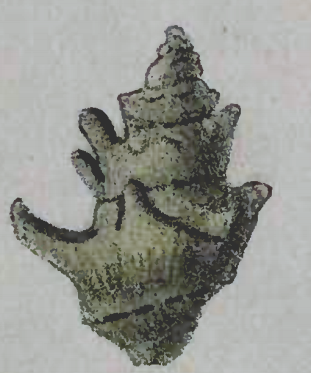
- Drawing of Clavus auriculifera

Scientific classification
- Kingdom: Animalia
- Phylum: Mollusca
- Class: Gastropoda
- Subclass: Caenogastropoda
- Order: Neogastropoda
- Superfamily: Conoidea
- Family: Drilliidae
- Genus: Clavus
- Species: C. auriculifera

Binomial name
- Clavus auriculifera Lamarck

Synonyms
- Drillia auriculifera Lamarck

= Clavus auriculifera =

Species of gastropod

Clavus auriculifera is a species of sea snail, a marine gastropod mollusk in the family Drilliidae.

This species needs further investigation (species inquirenda)

== Description ==
The shell is white, with a broad chestnut band below the periphery. The tuberculations of the periphery are often long, spinose. There is usually a revolving row of nodules below the middle of the body whorl.

== Distribution ==
This species occurs in the Indian Ocean along the Aldabra Atoll and in the Pacific Ocean along the Philippines.
