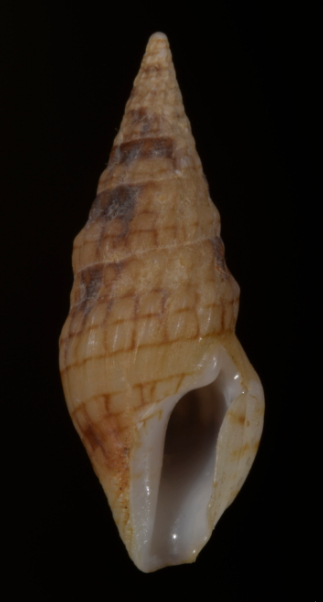
- Shell of Clavus moquinianus (specimen at MNHN, Paris)

Scientific classification
- Kingdom: Animalia
- Phylum: Mollusca
- Class: Gastropoda
- Subclass: Caenogastropoda
- Order: Neogastropoda
- Superfamily: Conoidea
- Family: Drilliidae
- Genus: Clavus
- Species: C. moquinianus

Binomial name
- Clavus moquinianus (Montrouzier, 1874)

Synonyms
- Clavus moquiniana (Montrouzier in Souverbie & Montrouzier, 1874); Pleurotoma moquiniana Montrouzier, 1874 (original combination)

= Clavus moquinianus =

Species of gastropod

Clavus moquinianus is a species of sea snail in the family Drilliidae.

== Description ==
The length of the shell attains 12 mm, its diameter 4.5 mm. The fusiform shell had an acuminate spire. It shows nine flattened whorls with shallow sutures; however, the penultimate whorl is subconvex. The two whorls of the protoconch are white and smooth. The shell is obliquely longitudinally costate, the costae fading towards the upper part and the base of the body whorl, with close revolving lines. The interior of the oval body whorl is white. The outer lip is sharp. The columellar lip has a fairly thick callus. The anal sinus is moderate and rounded. The wide siphonal canal is very short and slightly recurved. The columella is rather straight. The color of the shell is yellowish-white, marked with chestnut, and with also scarcely apparent lines of chestnut.

== Distribution ==
This marine species occurs off New Caledonia.
