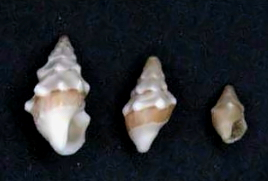
- Three shells of Clavus rugizonatus (museum specimens at Naturalis Biodiversity Center)

Scientific classification
- Kingdom: Animalia
- Phylum: Mollusca
- Class: Gastropoda
- Subclass: Caenogastropoda
- Order: Neogastropoda
- Superfamily: Conoidea
- Family: Drilliidae
- Genus: Clavus
- Species: C. rugizonatus

Binomial name
- Clavus rugizonatus Hervier, 1896

Synonyms
- Drillia (Clavus) rugizonata (Hervier, 1896); Pleurotoma (Clavus) rugizonata (Hervier, 1896); Turris (Clavus) rugizonata (Hervier, 1896)

= Clavus rugizonatus =

Species of gastropod

Clavus rugizonatus, common name the exasperating turrid, is a species of sea snail, a marine gastropod mollusk in the family Drilliidae.

== Description ==
The length of the shell attains 9 mm.

== Distribution ==
This is a marine species occurs off the Philippines, New Caledonia, Papua New Guinea and the Loyalty Islands.
