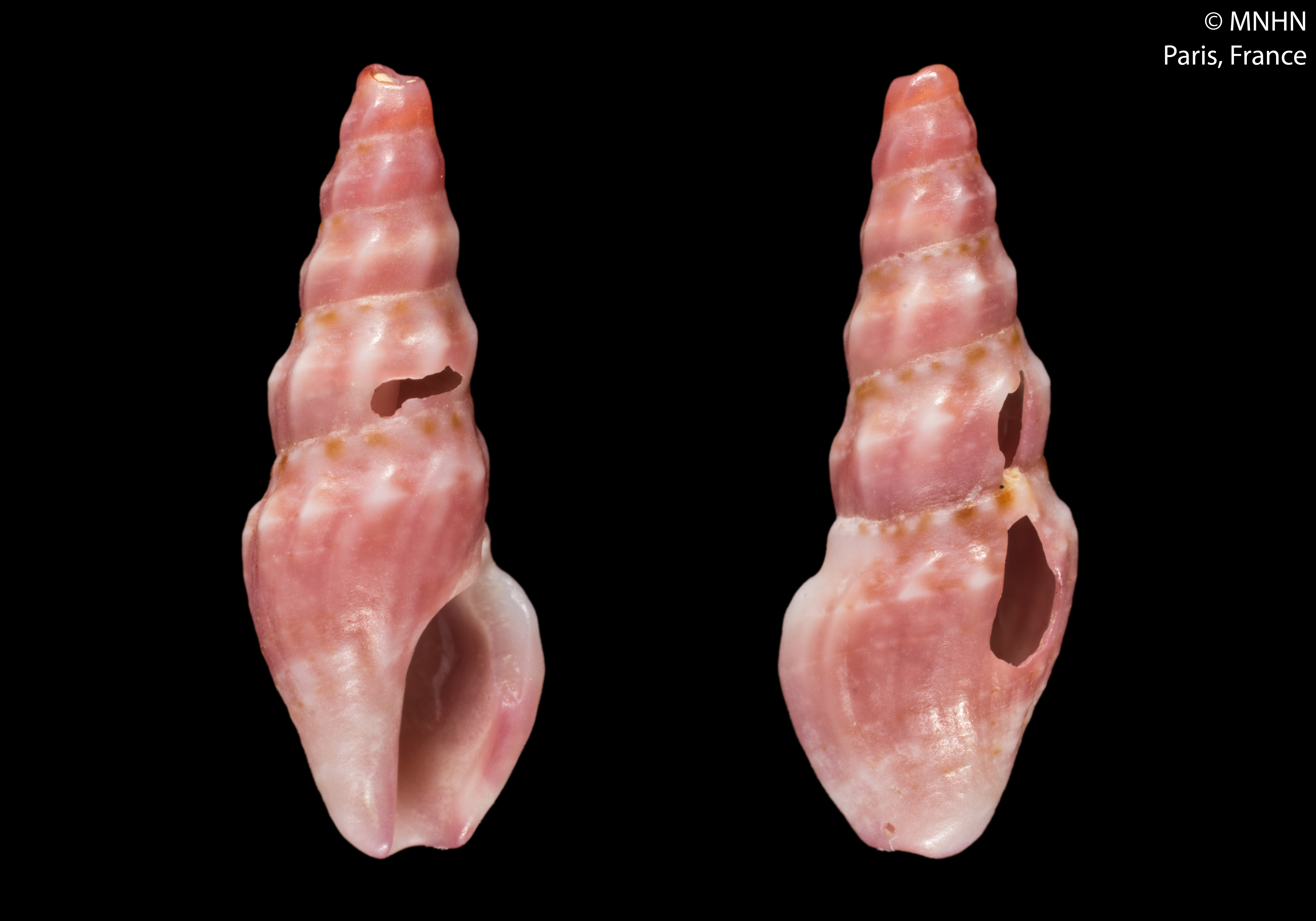
- Shell of Clavus roseofuscus (holotype at MNHN, Paris)

Scientific classification
- Kingdom: Animalia
- Phylum: Mollusca
- Class: Gastropoda
- Subclass: Caenogastropoda
- Order: Neogastropoda
- Superfamily: Conoidea
- Family: Drilliidae
- Genus: Clavus
- Species: C. roseofuscus

Binomial name
- Clavus roseofuscus (Bozzetti, 2007)

Synonyms
- Tylotiella roseofusca Bozzetti, 2007 (original combination)

= Clavus roseofuscus =

Species of gastropod

Clavus roseofuscus is a species of sea snail, a marine gastropod mollusc in the family Drilliidae.

== Description ==
The length of the shell attains 14 mm.

== Distribution ==
This marine species occurs off Madagascar.
