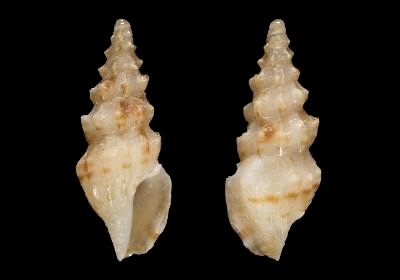
- Shells of Clavus squamiferus (holotype at MNHN, Paris)

Scientific classification
- Kingdom: Animalia
- Phylum: Mollusca
- Class: Gastropoda
- Subclass: Caenogastropoda
- Order: Neogastropoda
- Superfamily: Conoidea
- Family: Drilliidae
- Genus: Clavus
- Species: C. squamiferus

Binomial name
- Clavus squamiferus Kilburn, Fedosov & Kantor, 2014

= Clavus squamiferus =

Species of gastropod

Clavus squamiferus is a species of sea snail, a marine gastropod mollusc in the family Drilliidae.

== Distribution ==
This marine species occurs off New Caledonia.
