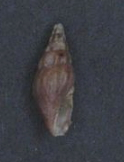
- Apertural view of a shell of Clavus fusconitens (museum specimen at Naturalis Biodiversity Center)

Scientific classification
- Kingdom: Animalia
- Phylum: Mollusca
- Class: Gastropoda
- Subclass: Caenogastropoda
- Order: Neogastropoda
- Superfamily: Conoidea
- Family: Drilliidae
- Genus: Clavus
- Species: C. fusconitens

Binomial name
- Clavus fusconitens (G. B. Sowerby III, 1901)

Synonyms
- Drillia fusconitens G. B. Sowerby III, 1901 (original combination); Pleurotoma fusconitens (G. B. Sowerby III, 1901)

= Clavus fusconitens =

Species of gastropod

Clavus fusconitens is a species of sea snail, a marine gastropod mollusk in the family Drilliidae.

== Description ==
The length of the shell attains 15 mm, its diameter 6 mm. The glossy, dark-brown shell has a fusiform shape. The angularity, common to the genus Clavus, is scarcely apparent. The shell contains 8 slightly convex whorls and 8 longitudinal ribs. The aperture is oblong. The almost straight columella shows a small callus. The acute outer lip is produced. The siphonal canal is short and not very wide.

== Distribution ==
This marine species occurs from the Philippines and Tahiti, French Polynesia.
