= Clavus glaucozona =

Scientific classification
- Kingdom: Animalia
- Phylum: Mollusca
- Class: Gastropoda
- Subclass: Caenogastropoda
- Order: Neogastropoda
- Superfamily: Conoidea
- Family: Drilliidae
- Genus: Clavus
- Species: C. glaucozona

Binomial name
- Clavus glaucozona Kilburn & Dekker, 2008

Synonyms
- Clavus (Tylotiella) glaucozona Kilburn & Dekker, 2008

Species of gastropod

Clavus glaucozona is a species of sea snail, a marine gastropod mollusk in the family Drilliidae.

== Description ==
The shell grows to a length of 16 mm.

== Distribution ==
This species occurs in the Red Sea.
