= Clavus aglaia =

Scientific classification
- Kingdom: Animalia
- Phylum: Mollusca
- Class: Gastropoda
- Subclass: Caenogastropoda
- Order: Neogastropoda
- Superfamily: Conoidea
- Family: Drilliidae
- Genus: Clavus
- Species: C. aglaia

Binomial name
- Clavus aglaia (Dall, 1918)

Synonyms
- Clavus crassa (Smith E.A,. 1888); Pleurotoma aglaia Dall, 1918; Pleurotoma (Drillia) crassa (Smith E.A,. 1888) (invalid: junior homonym of Pleurotoma crassa Edwards, 1856; Pleurotoma aglaia Dall, 1918 is a replacement name)

Species of gastropod

Clavus aglaia is a species of sea snail, a marine gastropod mollusk in the family Drilliidae.

== Description ==
The length of the shell attains 30 mm. A species of a solid build, white, with a violet apex and a few brownish spots scattered here and there on the upper halves of the ribs, and dotted with the same colour immediately beneath the suture.

== Distribution ==
This species occurs in the Northwest Indian Ocean off Mumbai.
