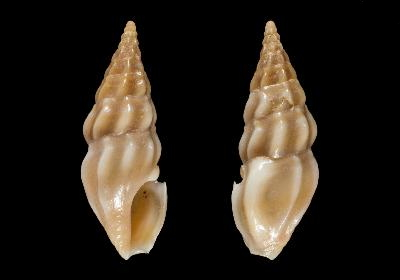
- Shell of Clavus maestratii (holotype at MNHN, Paris)

Scientific classification
- Kingdom: Animalia
- Phylum: Mollusca
- Class: Gastropoda
- Subclass: Caenogastropoda
- Order: Neogastropoda
- Superfamily: Conoidea
- Family: Drilliidae
- Genus: Clavus
- Species: C. maestratii

Binomial name
- Clavus maestratii Kilburn, Fedosov & Kantor, 2014

Synonyms
- Drillia (Clavus) fusconitens (non G. B. Sowerby, III, 1901) Bouge & Dautzenberg 1914: 139

= Clavus maestratii =

Species of gastropod

Clavus maestratii is a species of sea snail, a marine gastropod mollusc in the family Drilliidae.

== Description ==
The length of the shell attains 11.8 mm, its diameter 4.5 mm.

The shell is shiny and glossy and ranges in color from pale brown or grayish-brown to orange-brown, with the ribs usually being lighter in color.

The shell has a short siphonal canal (a narrow tube structure that extends from the opening of the shell) and a slightly contracted opening near its base.

== Distribution ==
This marine species occurs off New Caledonia.
