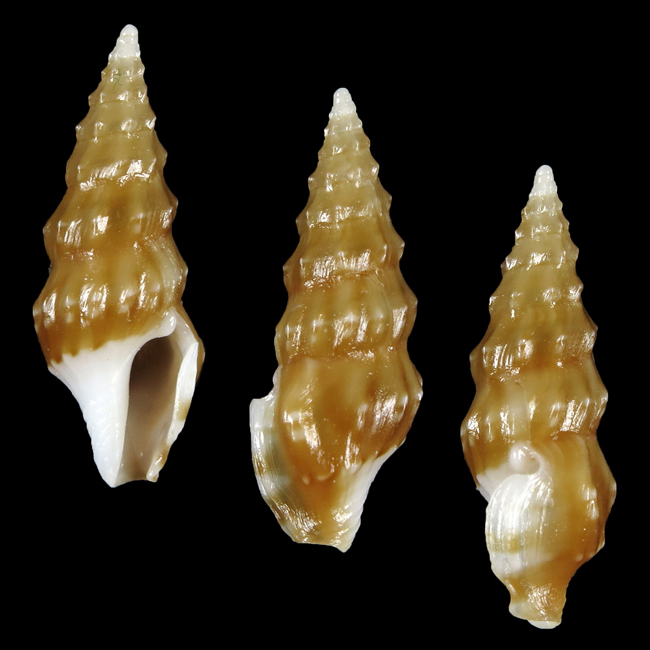

Scientific classification
- Kingdom: Animalia
- Phylum: Mollusca
- Class: Gastropoda
- Subclass: Caenogastropoda
- Order: Neogastropoda
- Superfamily: Conoidea
- Family: Drilliidae
- Genus: Clavus
- Species: C. particolor

Binomial name
- Clavus particolor Stahlschmidt, Poppe & Tagaro, 2018

= Clavus particolor =

Species of gastropod

Clavus particolor is a species of sea snail, a marine gastropoda mollusk in the family Drilliidae.

== Description ==
The length of the shell attains 14.8 mm.

== Distribution ==
This marine species occurs off the Philippines.

== Original description ==
- Stahlschmidt P., Poppe G.T. & Tagaro S.P. (2018). Descriptions of remarkable new turrid species from the Philippines. Visaya. 5(1): 5-64. page(s): 17, pl. 12 figs 1–3.
