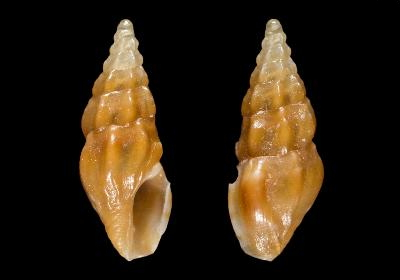
- Shell of Clavus hylikos (holotype in the MNHN, Paris)

Scientific classification
- Kingdom: Animalia
- Phylum: Mollusca
- Class: Gastropoda
- Subclass: Caenogastropoda
- Order: Neogastropoda
- Superfamily: Conoidea
- Family: Drilliidae
- Genus: Clavus
- Species: C. hylikos

Binomial name
- Clavus hylikos Kilburn, Fedosov & Kantor, 2014

= Clavus hylikos =

Species of gastropod

Clavus hylikos is a species of sea snail, a marine gastropod mollusc in the family Drilliidae.

== Description ==
The length of the shell attains 7.6 mm. The species has significant variation in color patterning and body proportions. The mollusc also has 40 rows of teeth.

== Distribution ==
This is a marine species occurs off New Caledonia.
