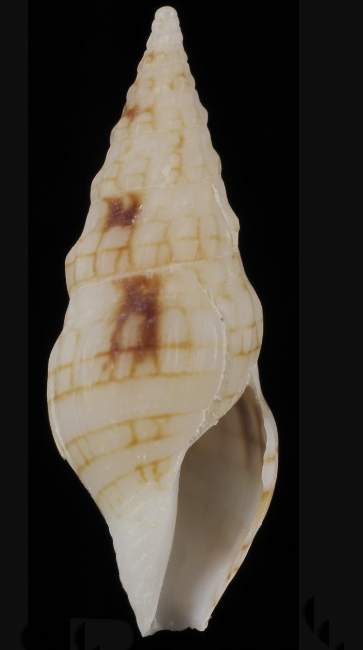
- Shell of Clavus pica (specimen at MNHN, Paris)

Scientific classification
- Kingdom: Animalia
- Phylum: Mollusca
- Class: Gastropoda
- Subclass: Caenogastropoda
- Order: Neogastropoda
- Superfamily: Conoidea
- Family: Drilliidae
- Genus: Clavus
- Species: C. pica

Binomial name
- Clavus pica (Reeve, 1843)

Synonyms
- Clavus (Tylotia) pica (Reeve, 1843); Drillia pica (Reeve, 1843); Pleurotoma (Drillia) pica Reeve, 1843; Turris (Inquisitor) pica (Reeve, 1843); Tylotiella pica (Reeve, 1843)

= Clavus pica =

Species of gastropod

Clavus pica is a species of sea snail, a marine gastropod mollusk in the family Drilliidae.

== Description ==
The size of an adult shell varies between 8 mm and 25 mm. The thick shell is whitish, irregularly variegated with a few large squarish brown spots. The upper portion of the whorls is smooth, concave, below the periphery with numerous narrow ribs. The anal sinus is broad.

== Distribution ==
This species occurs in the demersal zone of the Indo-Pacific off Guam, the Philippines, Indonesia, Tuamotus and Christmas Island.
