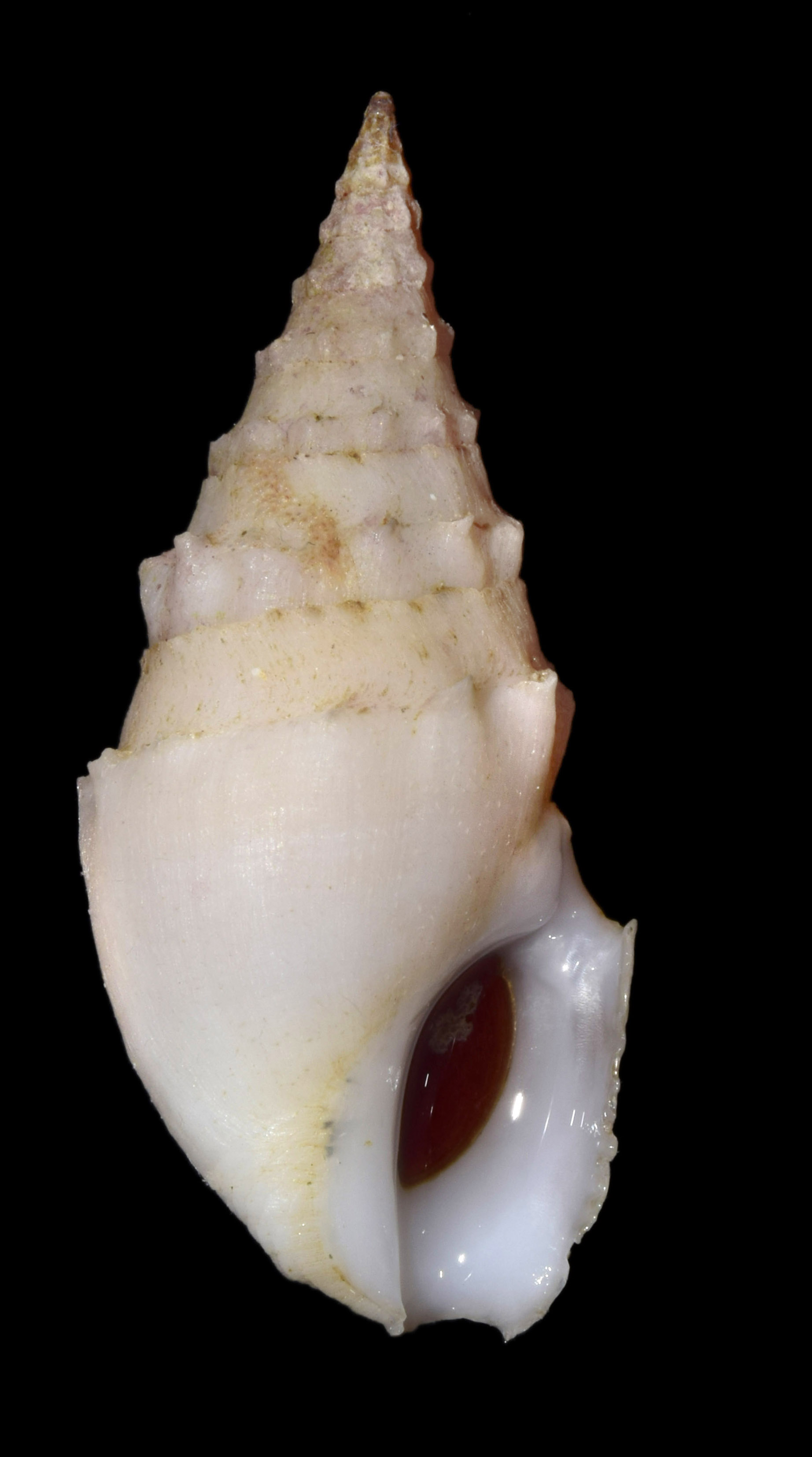
- Shell of Clavus brianmayi (holotype at MNHN, Paris)

Scientific classification
- Kingdom: Animalia
- Phylum: Mollusca
- Class: Gastropoda
- Subclass: Caenogastropoda
- Order: Neogastropoda
- Superfamily: Conoidea
- Family: Drilliidae
- Genus: Clavus
- Species: C. brianmayi

Binomial name
- Clavus brianmayi Fedosov & Puillandre, 2020

= Clavus brianmayi =

Species of gastropod

Clavus brianmayi is a species of sea snail, a marine gastropod mollusk in the family Drilliidae.

== Description ==
The length of the shell attains 27.8 mm.

== Distribution ==
This is a marine species endemic to Papua New Guinea.
