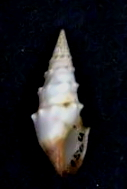
- Apertural view of a shell of Clavus wilmeri (museum specimen at Naturalis Biodiversity Center)

Scientific classification
- Kingdom: Animalia
- Phylum: Mollusca
- Class: Gastropoda
- Subclass: Caenogastropoda
- Order: Neogastropoda
- Superfamily: Conoidea
- Family: Drilliidae
- Genus: Clavus
- Species: C. wilmeri

Binomial name
- Clavus wilmeri (E.A. Smith, 1879)

Synonyms
- Drillia wilmeri E.A. Smith, 1879; Pleurotoma (Drillia) wilmeri E.A. Smith, 1879

= Clavus wilmeri =

Species of gastropod

Clavus wilmeri is a species of sea snail, a marine gastropod mollusk in the family Drilliidae.

== Description ==
The shell grows to a length of 16 mm. The shell is sharply keeled and noduled on the periphery, with revolving striae below it, stronger towards the base. The shell is whitish, stained with chestnut at the apex and on the lower part of the body whorl. There is a row of chestnut dots between the nodules of the periphery.

== Distribution ==
This species occurs in the demersal zone of the Andaman Islands.
