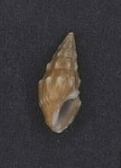
- Apertural view of a shell of Clavus obliquatus (museum specimen at Naturalis Biodiversity Center)

Scientific classification
- Kingdom: Animalia
- Phylum: Mollusca
- Class: Gastropoda
- Subclass: Caenogastropoda
- Order: Neogastropoda
- Superfamily: Conoidea
- Family: Drilliidae
- Genus: Clavus
- Species: C. obliquatus

Binomial name
- Clavus obliquatus (Reeve, 1845)

Synonyms
- Clavus (Tylotiella) obliquata (Reeve, 1845); Drillia obliquata (Reeve, 1845); Pleurotoma obliquata Reeve, 1845; Tylotiella obliquata (Reeve, 1845)

= Clavus obliquatus =

Species of gastropod

Clavus obliquatus is a species of sea snail, a marine gastropod mollusk in the family Drilliidae.

== Description ==
The length of the shell attains 33 mm.

The shell is yellowish brown, within and without, with a narrow lighter band on the periphery, and sometimes a row of white dots on the ribs a little below the middle of the body whorl. There are a few revolving striae at the base of the shell.

== Distribution ==
This marine species is endemic to Australia and occurs off Queensland; it has also been found off the Philippines.
