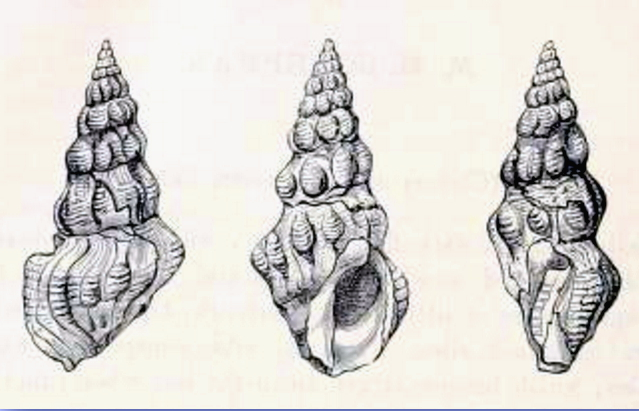
- Original image of the shell of Clavus albotuberculatus

Scientific classification
- Kingdom: Animalia
- Phylum: Mollusca
- Class: Gastropoda
- Subclass: Caenogastropoda
- Order: Neogastropoda
- Superfamily: Conoidea
- Family: Drilliidae
- Genus: Clavus
- Species: C. albotuberculatus

Binomial name
- Clavus albotuberculatus (Schepman, 1889)

Synonyms
- Drillia (Clavus) albotuberculata Schepman, 1889 (basionym)

= Clavus albotuberculatus =

Species of gastropod

Clavus albotuberculatus is a species of sea snail, a marine gastropod mollusk in the family Drilliidae.

== Description ==
The length of the shell varies between 40 mm and 50 mm.

(Original description) The elongate shell is, dark fleshy brown, with large white riblike nodules and a white infra-sutural line. It contains 10 whorls. The apical ones of the holotype are a little eroded and smooth. The next two whorls show rather indistinct ribs, the rest conspicuous white nodules, which become larger up to the body whorl. On this whorl, which is somewhat oblique, they are smaller on the ventral side. It shows a very large nodule before the aperture and a second row of much smaller ones, which are not visible on the upper whorls. The surface of the shell is covered with faint spiral lirae, which are more distinct on the nodules. Their suture is linear, irregular in consequence of the nodules of which there are 9 on the body whorl, besides 12 of the second row, and 6 or 7 on the upper whorls, where they occupy nearly the whole breadth, except a narrow zone at the upper part of each whorl. The aperture is rather small, the interior white with fleshy brown spots near the margin. The sinus is large, rounded and not deep,. The outer lip is thin, arcuate and prominent, slightly crenulate. The siphonal canal is very short and large. The columella is slightly curved, with a brown callosity, its lower extremity produced, near the suture with a strong tubercle.

== Distribution ==
This is a marine species occurs off the Philippines and New Caledonia
