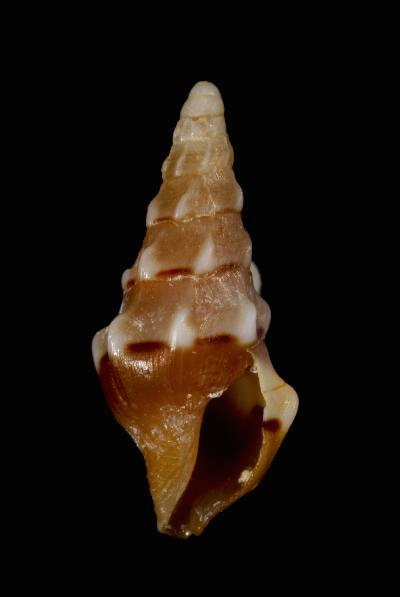
- Shell of Clavus protentus (specimen at MNHN, Paris)

Scientific classification
- Kingdom: Animalia
- Phylum: Mollusca
- Class: Gastropoda
- Subclass: Caenogastropoda
- Order: Neogastropoda
- Superfamily: Conoidea
- Family: Drilliidae
- Genus: Clavus
- Species: C. protentus

Binomial name
- Clavus protentus Hervier, 1896

Synonyms
- Drillia (Clavus) protentus Melvill & Standen 1897; Drillia (Clavus) protenta Bouge & Dautzenberg 1914

= Clavus protentus =

Species of gastropod

Clavus protentus is a species of sea snail, a marine gastropod mollusk in the family Drilliidae.

== Description ==
The length of the shell attains 13.5 mm, its diameter 4.5 mm.

The elongate turriform shell is white in the subsutural and peripheral region, with the remainder reddish brown. The basal part of the body whorl shows rows of white dots. The shell contains 6-7 whorls, which are concave on top and convex below. The axial ribs are initially arcuate and in later whorls opisthocline, numbering 12 on the penultimate whorl. The dense, spiral threads are very small. The aperture is oblong-ovate. The wide anal sinus has an U-shaped form. The columella is almost straight. The sharp outer lip is thickened towards the suture.

== Distribution ==
This marine species is endemic to endemic to Lifou, Loyalty Islands.
