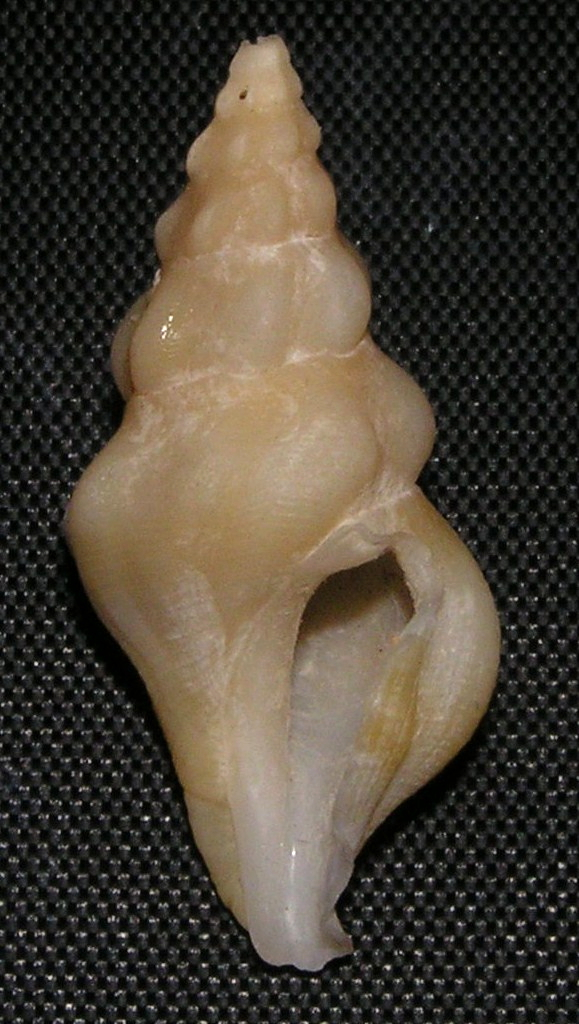
- Apertural view of a shell of Clavus obliquicostatus

Scientific classification
- Kingdom: Animalia
- Phylum: Mollusca
- Class: Gastropoda
- Subclass: Caenogastropoda
- Order: Neogastropoda
- Superfamily: Conoidea
- Family: Drilliidae
- Genus: Clavus
- Species: C. obliquicostatus

Binomial name
- Clavus obliquicostatus (Reeve, 1845)

Synonyms
- Clavus leforestieri Hervier, 1896; Drillia (Clavus) leforestieri (Hervier, 1896); Drillia (Clavus) leforestieri var. albina Bouge & Dautzenberg, 1914; Drillia obliquicostata (Reeve, 1845); Pleurotoma obliquicostata Reeve, 1845 (original combination)

= Clavus obliquicostatus =

Species of gastropod

Clavus obliquicostatus is a species of sea snail, a marine gastropod mollusk in the family Drilliidae.

== Description ==
The length of the shell attains 33 mm. The longitudinal ribs are oblique, narrow, a little waved, and obtusely pointed on the periphery. A few revolve astride at the base of the body whorl. The shell is yellowish white, spotted and maculated with chestnut.

== Distribution ==
This marine species occurs off New Caledonia and Papua New Guinea
