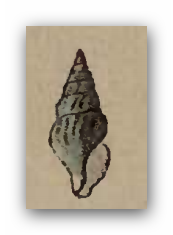
- Drawing of a shell of Clavus candens

Scientific classification
- Kingdom: Animalia
- Phylum: Mollusca
- Class: Gastropoda
- Subclass: Caenogastropoda
- Order: Neogastropoda
- Superfamily: Conoidea
- Family: Drilliidae
- Genus: Clavus
- Species: C. candens

Binomial name
- Clavus candens (E.A. Smith, 1879)

Synonyms
- Drillia candens E.A. Smith, 1879

= Clavus candens =

Species of gastropod

Clavus candens is a species of sea snail, a marine gastropod mollusk in the family Drilliidae.

== Description ==
The shell grows to a length of 12 mm. The shell is white, shining and subpellucid. There are eight whorls. The nuclear whorl is smooth. The normal whorls are obliquely ribbed, with here and there fine spiral striae requiring a glass to make them out. The lower part of body whorl is obliquely grooved. The anal sinus is very wide and deep.

== Distribution ==
This marine species occurs along Korea and Japan.
