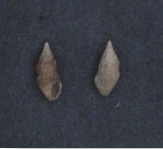
- Two shells of Clavus coffea (museum specimens at Naturalis Biodiversity Center)

Scientific classification
- Kingdom: Animalia
- Phylum: Mollusca
- Class: Gastropoda
- Subclass: Caenogastropoda
- Order: Neogastropoda
- Superfamily: Conoidea
- Family: Drilliidae
- Genus: Clavus
- Species: C. coffea

Binomial name
- Clavus coffea (E.A. Smith, 1882)

Synonyms
- Pleurotoma (Clavus) coffea E.A. Smith, 1882

= Clavus coffea =

Species of gastropod

Clavus coffea is a species of sea snail, a marine gastropod mollusk in the family Drilliidae.

== Description ==
The ovate shell has an acuminate apex. The color of the shell is red with white ribs in the middle. The fine apical whorls are small and produced suddenly into a cone. The shell contains 9 slightly convex whorls. The length of the aperture equals 7/17th of the length of the shell. The columella is callous and covered with tubercles at the suture. The anal sinus is small and located under a tubercle. The siphonal canal is very short.

== Distribution ==
This species is found in the demersal zone of the Western Central Pacific Ocean off the Philippines.
