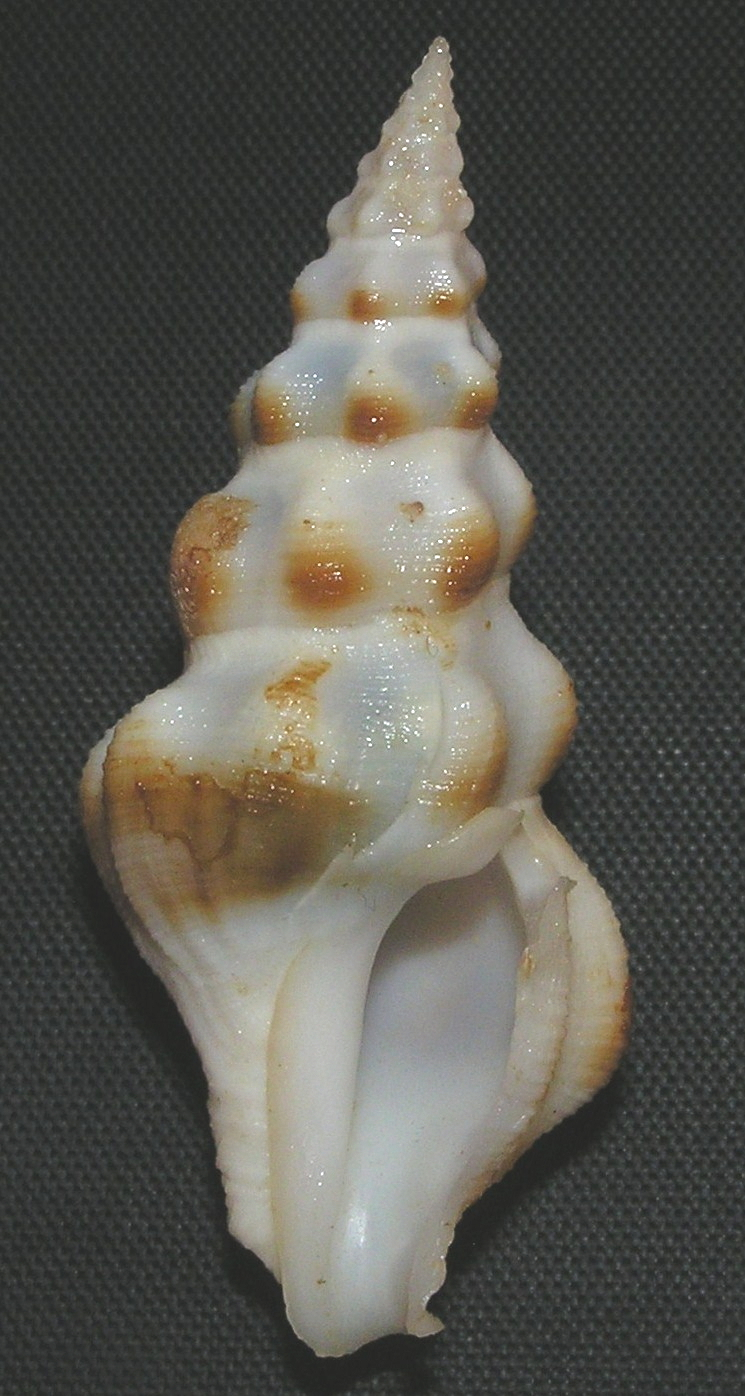
- Apertural view of a shell of Drillia enna

Scientific classification
- Kingdom: Animalia
- Phylum: Mollusca
- Class: Gastropoda
- Subclass: Caenogastropoda
- Order: Neogastropoda
- Superfamily: Conoidea
- Family: Drilliidae
- Genus: Drillia
- Species: D. enna

Binomial name
- Drillia enna (Dall, 1918)

Synonyms
- Clavus enna (Dall, 1918); Drillia unifasciata (Smith, 1888) (primary homonym of Pleurotoma unifasciata Deshayes, 1835); Neodrillia enna (W.H. Dall, 1918); Pleurotoma enna Dall, 1918

= Drillia enna =

Species of gastropod

Drillia enna, common name the Enna turrid, is a species of sea snail, a marine gastropod mollusk in the family Drilliidae.

== Description ==
The size of the shell varies between 25 mm and 60 mm.

== Distribution ==
This species is found in the demersal zone of tropical waters in the Indo-Pacific. and off the Philippines.
