= Pyrgocythara mighelsi =

Scientific classification
- Kingdom: Animalia
- Phylum: Mollusca
- Class: Gastropoda
- Subclass: Caenogastropoda
- Order: Neogastropoda
- Family: Mangeliidae
- Genus: Pyrgocythara
- Species: P. mighelsi

Binomial name
- Pyrgocythara mighelsi (Kay, 1979)

Synonyms
- Clavus mighelsi Kay, 1979 (original combination); Clavus (Tylotiella) mighelsi Kay, 1979; Clavus acuminata (Mighels, 1845); Iredalea acuminata (J.W. Mighels, 1845); Pleurotoma acuminata Mighels, 1845 (invalid: junior homonym of Pleurotoma acuminata J. Sowerby, 1816; Clavus mighelsi is a replacement name)

Species of gastropod

Pyrgocythara mighelsi is a species of sea snail, a marine gastropod mollusk in the family Mangeliidae.

== Description ==
The length of the shell attains 6 mm.

== Distribution ==
This species occurs in the demersal zone of the Pacific Ocean off Hawaii, Taiwan and New Caledonia.
