= Clavus aenigmaticus =

Scientific classification
- Kingdom: Animalia
- Phylum: Mollusca
- Class: Gastropoda
- Subclass: Caenogastropoda
- Order: Neogastropoda
- Superfamily: Conoidea
- Family: Drilliidae
- Genus: Clavus
- Species: C. aenigmaticus

Binomial name
- Clavus aenigmaticus Wells, 1991

Species of gastropod

Clavus aenigmaticus is a species of sea snail, a marine gastropod mollusk in the family Drilliidae. Described by Wells in 1991, this marine gastropod is endemic to Australia, specifically found off the coast of Western Australia.

== Description ==
The length of the shell attains 18.6 mm.

== Distribution ==
This is a marine species endemic to Australia and occurring off Western Australia.
