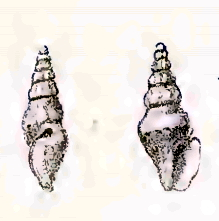
- Drawing of the shell of Austrodrillia dimidiata

Scientific classification
- Kingdom: Animalia
- Phylum: Mollusca
- Class: Gastropoda
- Subclass: Caenogastropoda
- Order: Neogastropoda
- Superfamily: Conoidea
- Family: Horaiclavidae
- Genus: Austrodrillia; Hedley, 1918

Type species
- Pleurotoma angasi Crosse, 1863

Species
- See text

Synonyms
- Austrodrillia (Regidrillia) Powell, 1942; Regidrillia Powell, 1942

= Austrodrillia =

Genus of gastropods

Austrodrillia is a genus of sea snails, marine gastropod mollusks in the family Horaiclavidae.

It was previously categorized within Crassispirinae, Turridae.

== Description ==
The small shell is very solid, subcylindrical or claviform. The sculpture consists of nodose ribs that do not attain the suture, and fine spiral threads which are most dense at the summit of the whorl. There is no epidermis. The protoconch consists of two smooth and elevate whorls. The aperture is wide, without varix or internal armature. The outer lip is simple. The wide sinus is U-shaped, its right margin resting on a massive insertion callus. The fasciole is indistinguishable.

== Distribution ==
This marine genus occurs off Australia and New Zealand. One species is found in the Atlantic Ocean off St. Helena.

== Species ==
Species within the genus Austrodrillia include:

- Austrodrillia agrestis (Verco, 1909)
- Austrodrillia albobalteata (E. A. Smith, 1890)
- Austrodrillia angasi (Crosse, 1863)
- Austrodrillia beraudiana (Crosse, 1863)
- Austrodrillia dimidiata (Sowerby III, 1896)
- Austrodrillia hinomotoensis Kuroda, Habe & Oyama, 1971
- Austrodrillia rawitensis Hedley, 1922
- Austrodrillia saxea (Sowerby III, 1896)
- Austrodrillia secunda Powell, 1965
- Austrodrillia sola Powell, 1942
- Austrodrillia subplicata (Verco, 1909)

Species brought into synonymy

- Austrodrillia achatina Verco, J.C., 1909: synonym of Austrodrillia dimidiata (Sowerby III, 1896)
- † Austrodrillia alpha L. C. King, 1933: synonym of † Aoteadrillia alpha (L. C. King, 1933)
- Austrodrillia burnupi (Sowerby III, 1897): synonym of Tylotiella burnupi (Sowerby III, 1897)
- † Austrodrillia cinctuta Marwick, 1929: synonym of † Mauidrillia clavicula Powell, 1942
- † Austrodrillia consequens C.R. Laws, 1936: synonym of † Aoteadrillia consequens (Laws, 1936)
- † Austrodrillia koruahinensis Bartrum & Powell, 1928: synonym of † Splendrillia koruahinensis (Bartrum & Powell, 1928)
- Austrodrillia hottentota (E. A. Smith, 1882): synonym of Tylotiella hottentota (E. A. Smith, 1882)
- Austrodrillia nenia (Hedley, 1903): synonym of Splendrillia nenia (Hedley, 1903)
- Austrodrillia praetermissa (E. A. Smith, 1904): synonym of Naudedrillia praetermissa (E. A. Smith, 1904)
- Austrodrillia woodsi (Beddome, 1883): synonym of Splendrillia woodsi (Beddome, 1883)
