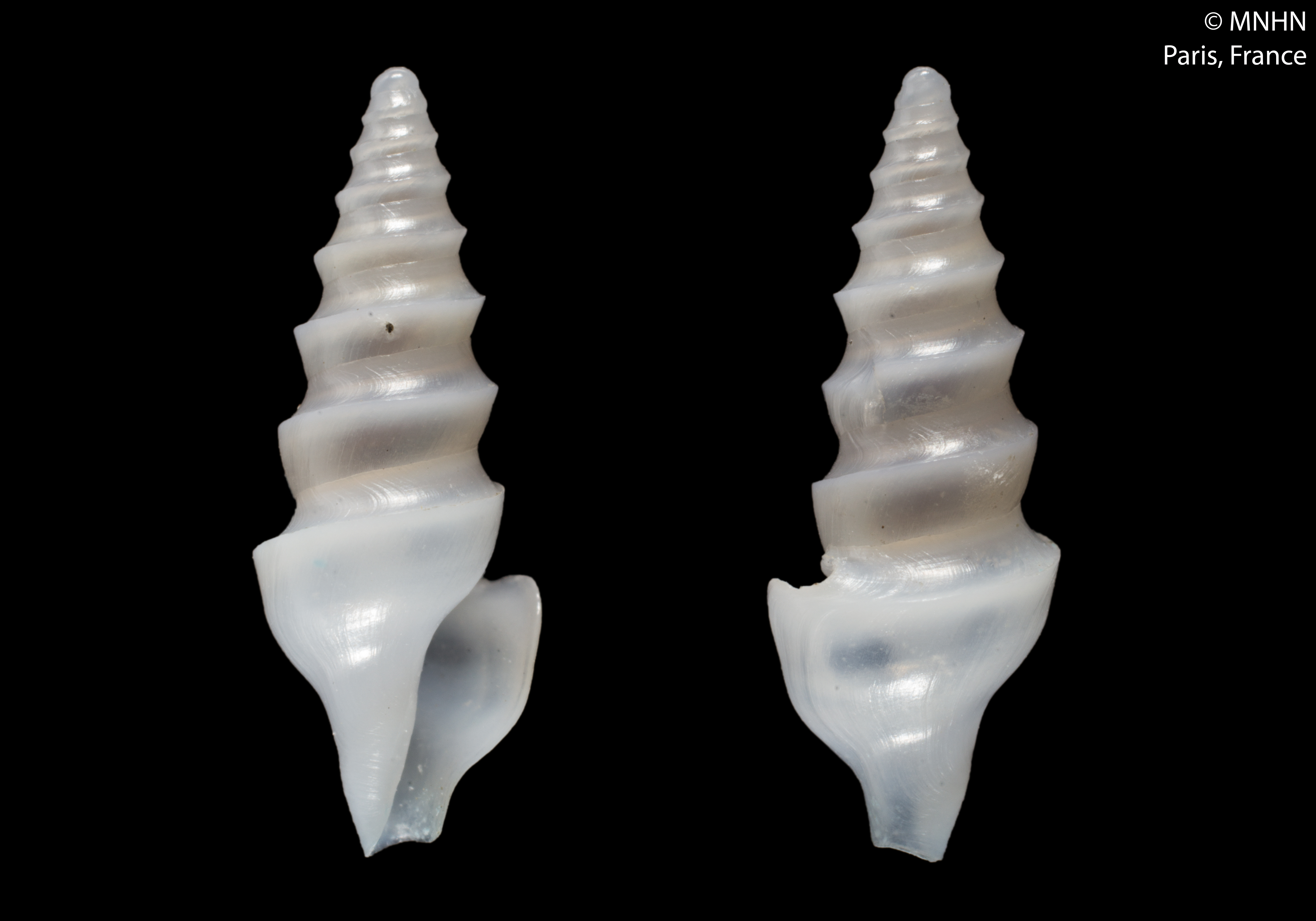
- Shell of Spirotropis azorica (holotype at MNHN, Paris)

Scientific classification
- Kingdom: Animalia
- Phylum: Mollusca
- Class: Gastropoda
- Subclass: Caenogastropoda
- Order: Neogastropoda
- Superfamily: Conoidea
- Family: Drilliidae
- Genus: Spirotropis; Sars, 1878

Type species
- †Pleurotoma carinata Bivona, 1838

Species
- See text

Synonyms
- Pleurotoma (Spirotropis) G. O. Sars, 1878

= Spirotropis (gastropod) =

Genus of gastropods

Spirotropis is a genus of sea snails, marine gastropod mollusks in the family Drilliidae.

== Species ==
Species within the genus Spirotropis include:

- Spirotropis agamedea (Dall, W.H., 1919)
- Spirotropis aganactica (Watson, 1886)
- † Spirotropis alejandroi Vera-Peláez, 2022
- Spirotropis azorica Bouchet & Warén, 1980
- † Spirotropis badensis R. Janssen, 1993
- † Spirotropis bainbridgensis Durham, 1944
- † Spirotropis calodius Moore, 1963
- † Spirotropis campi Durham, 1944
- † Spirotropis carinata (Bivona, 1838) (synonym of Spirotropis confusa confusa (G. Seguenza, 1880)
- Spirotropis centimata (Dall, 1889)
- † Spirotropis claibornica Garvie, 1996
- † Spirotropis clavatulina Vera-Peláez, 2022
- Spirotropis confusa (Seguenza, 1880)
- Spirotropis cymothoe (W.H. Dall, 1919)
- Spirotropis ephamilla Verrill, 1884
- Spirotropis eurytima Morassi, 1998
- Spirotropis galiciensis Oliver & Horro, 2022
- Spirotropis genilda (Dall, 1908)
- † Spirotropis gramensis R. Janssen, 1993
- Spirotropis guancha Ortega & Gofas, 2019
- Spirotropis hernandezi Horro, Gori & Rolán, 2024
- † Spirotropis karamanensis R. Janssen, 1993
- Spirotropis laodice (Dall, 1919)
- Spirotropis limula Martens, 1904
- Spirotropis lithocolleta (Watson, 1881)
- † Spirotropis modiolus (de Cristofori & Jan, 1832)
- Spirotropis monterosatoi (Locard, 1897)
- Spirotropis phaeacra (Watson, 1881)
- † Spirotropis spinescens (Bellardi, 1847)
- Spirotropis stirophora (Watson, 1881)
- Spirotropis studeriana (Martens, 1878)
- Spirotropis tmeta (Watson, 1881)
- †Spirotropis tortonica R. Janssen, 1993
- † Spirotropis washingtonensis Etherington, 1931

Species brought into synonymy

- Spirotropis acutus L.M.D. Bellardi in E. Sismonda, 1842: synonym of Spirotropis modiolus (G.J. De Cristofori & G. Jan, 1832)
- Spirotropis azoricus Bouchet & Warén, 1980: synonym of Spirotropis azorica Bouchet & Warén, 1980
- Spirotropis bulbacea R.B. Watson, 1881 synonym of Aoteadrillia bulbacea (R.B. Watson, 1881)
- Spirotropis centimatus (Dall, 1889): synonym of Spirotropis centimata (Dall, 1889)
- Spirotropis clytotropis Sykes, 1906: synonym of Ancistrosyrinx clytotropis (Sykes, 1906)
- Spirotropis leucopyrga W. Kobelt, 1904: synonym of Spirotropis centimata (W.H. Dall, 1889)
- Spirotropis megalacme Sykes, 1906: synonym of Drilliola megalacme (Sykes, 1906)
- Spirotropis melvilli Sykes, 1906: synonym of Micropleurotoma melvilli (Sykes, 1906)
- Spirotropis meta R.B. Watson, 1881: synonym of Spirotropis tmeta (R.B. Watson, 1881)
- Spirotropis patagonica (d'Orbigny, 1841): synonym of Bela patagonica (d'Orbigny, 1841) (superseded combination)
- Spirotropis remota Powell, 1958: synonym of Micropleurotoma remota (Powell, 1958)
- Spirotropis sarsi Warén, 1975: synonym of Spirotropis confusa (Seguenza, 1880)
- Spirotropis scalaris P. Partsch in J. Von Hauer, 1837:synonym of Spirotropis modiolus (G.J. De Cristofori & G. Jan, 1832)
- † Spirotropis spinescens Bernasconi & Robba, 1985 (partim); synonym of † Spirotropis badensis R. Janssen, 1993
- Spirotropis turrisulcata É.A.A. Locard, 1897: synonym of Theta chariessa (R.B. Watson, 1881)
