= Tylotiella =

Scientific classification
- Kingdom: Animalia
- Phylum: Mollusca
- Class: Gastropoda
- Subclass: Caenogastropoda
- Order: Neogastropoda
- Superfamily: Conoidea
- Family: Drilliidae
- Genus: Tylotiella; Habe, 1958

Type species
- Drillia subobliquata E.A. Smith, 1879

Species
- See text

Genus of gastropods

Tylotiella is a genus of sea snails, marine gastropod molluscs in the family Drilliidae.

This genus has become a synonym of Clavus Montfort, 1810.

== Species ==
Species within the genus Tylotiella include:

- Tylotiella decaryi (Dautzenberg, 1932)
- Tylotiella androyensis Bozzetti, 2007: synonym of Clavus androyensis (Bozzetti, 2007)
- Tylotiella basipunctata Kilburn, 1988: synonym of Clavus basipunctatus (Kilburn, 1988)
- Tylotiella biancae Bozzetti, 2008: synonym of Clavus biancae (Bozzetti, 2008)
- Tylotiella burnupi (Sowerby III, 1897): synonym of Clavus burnupi (G. B. Sowerby III, 1897)
- Tylotiella falcicosta (Barnard, 1958): synonym of Clavus falcicosta (Barnard, 1958)
- Tylotiella herberti Kilburn, 1988: synonym of Clavus herberti (Kilburn, 1988)
- Tylotiella heryi Bozzetti, 2007: synonym of Clavus heryi (Bozzetti, 2007)
- Tylotiella hottentota (E.A. Smith, 1882): synonym of Clavus hottentotus (E. A. Smith, 1882)
- Tylotiella humilis (E.A. Smith, 1879): synonym of Clavus humilis (E. A. Smith, 1879)
- Tylotiella isibopho Kilburn, 1988: synonym of Clavus isibopho (Kilburn, 1988)
- Tylotiella japonica (Lischke, 1869): synonym of Clavus japonicus (Lischke, 1869)
- Tylotiella malva Morassi, 1998: synonym of Clavus malva (Morassi, 1998)
- Tylotiella mediocris (Deshayes, 1863): synonym of Pleurotoma mediocris Deshayes, 1863 (nomen dubium)
- Tylotiella obliquata (Reeve, 1845): synonym of Clavus obliquatus (Reeve, 1845)
- Tylotiella papilio Kilburn, 1988: synonym of Clavus papilio (Kilburn, 1988)
- Tylotiella pica (Reeve, 1843): synonym of Clavus pica (Reeve, 1843)
- Tylotiella quadrata Kilburn, 1988: synonym of Clavus quadratus (Kilburn, 1988)
- Tylotiella rissoiniformis (Kay, 1979): synonym of Clavus rissoiniformis Kay, 1979
- Tylotiella roseofusca Bozzetti, 2007: synonym of Clavus roseofuscus (Bozzetti, 2007)
- Tylotiella subobliquata (E.A. Smith, 1879): synonym of Clavus subobliquatus (E. A. Smith, 1879)
- Tylotiella sulekile Kilburn, 1988: synonym of Clavus sulekile (Kilburn, 1988)
