= Spirotropis modiolus =

Scientific classification
- Kingdom: Animalia
- Phylum: Mollusca
- Class: Gastropoda
- Subclass: Caenogastropoda
- Order: Neogastropoda
- Superfamily: Conoidea
- Family: Drilliidae
- Genus: Spirotropis
- Species: S. modiolus

Binomial name
- Spirotropis modiolus (de Cristofori & Jan, 1832)

Synonyms
- Fusus modiolus de Cristofori & Jan, 1832; Pleurotoma carinata Bivona-Bernardi, Ant. in Bivona-Bernardi, And., 1838; Spirotropis acutus L.M.D. Bellardi in E. Sismonda, 1842; Spirotropis scalaris P. Partsch in J. Von Hauer, 1837

Extinct species of gastropod

Spirotropis modiolus is an extinct species of sea snail, a marine gastropod mollusk in the family Drilliidae. It was originally described as Fusus modiolus and was transferred to the genus Spirotropis in Ronald Janssen's 1993 taxonomic revision of the genus.

== Description ==
The shell is small and comparatively slender, with about five to six teleoconch whorls; it is very smooth and glossy. Each whorl bears a sharp carina (keel) at mid-whorl, the edge of which is not bent upwards. The body whorl generally lacks a bulge opposite the aperture, though a very weak swelling is occasionally present about one-quarter to one-half whorl in front of the opening. The siphonal canal is short, slender and smooth, without spiral striation on its back. The protoconch is comparatively large and mammillate, consisting of about 1.5 to 1.75 whorls.

Type-locality material examined by Janssen (1993) measured 6.4–9.5 mm in shell height at Tabiano, and 6.1–8.8 mm at Le Puget-sur-Argens. Its small, constant size, smooth glossy shell, and siphonal canal devoid of spiral striation distinguish S. modiolus from the various Miocene species of the genus, as well as from the larger, more variable Pliocene-to-Recent species S. confusa.

== Distribution ==
The type locality of Spirotropis modiolus is Tabiano, Province of Parma, northern Italy, where it occurs in grey clay of Early Pliocene (Zanclian) age; the species has also been recorded from Lugagnano, Italy, and from Le Puget-sur-Argens, southern France. Fossils were found in Pliocene strata of Italy, with an age range of 5.332 to 3.6 million years ago. The species occupied relatively deep water, as indicated by the fauna accompanying it at Tabiano, and is thought to have become extinct during the Middle Pliocene, alongside a number of other mollusc species that disappeared around that time.

== Taxonomy ==
Spirotropis modiolus was first described as Fusus modiolus by Giuseppe de Cristofori and Giorgio Jan in 1832. For roughly a century afterward, the name modiolus was applied broadly — and inconsistently — to fossil and living turrid populations across Europe, until Ronald Janssen's 1993 revision of the genus Spirotropis restricted the name specifically to this Early Pliocene Mediterranean fossil form, distinguishing it from several previously conflated Miocene and Recent species, including S. confusa, S. gramensis, and S. tortonica.
