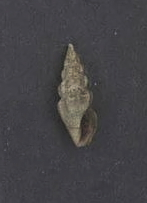
- Shell of Austrodrillia beraudiana (Museum specimen at Naturalis Biodiversity Center)

Scientific classification
- Kingdom: Animalia
- Phylum: Mollusca
- Class: Gastropoda
- Subclass: Caenogastropoda
- Order: Neogastropoda
- Superfamily: Conoidea
- Family: Horaiclavidae
- Genus: Austrodrillia
- Species: A. beraudiana

Binomial name
- Austrodrillia beraudiana (Crosse, 1863)

Synonyms
- Drillia beraudiana (Crosse, 1863); Drillia taeniata J.E. Tenison-Woods, 1878; Pleurotoma beraudiana Crosse, 1863

= Austrodrillia beraudiana =

Species of gastropod

Austrodrillia beraudiana is a species of sea snail, a marine gastropod mollusk in the family Horaiclavidae.

It was previously categorized within the family Turridae.

== Description ==
The length of the shell attains 17 mm. This is a stouter, shorter shell than Austrodrillia angasi, with fewer, more widely spaced ribs. Description by Des Beechey (2004): "Shell sculptured with solid axial ribs, restricted to lower two thirds of spire whorls, 7 or 8 per whorl, crossed by fine spiral threads. Axial ribs fading out on lower half of body whorl. Inner lip of aperture with callous pad at upper end in mature shells; outer lip with rounded V-shaped sinus with apex at centre of shoulder slope. Colour fawn, axial ribs cream."

== Distribution ==
This marine species is endemic to Australia and occurs off New South Wales (Clarence River), southernTasmania and Victoria.
