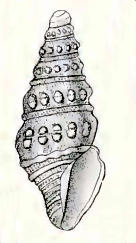
- Image of a shell of Aoteadrillia wanganuiensis

Scientific classification
- Kingdom: Animalia
- Phylum: Mollusca
- Class: Gastropoda
- Subclass: Caenogastropoda
- Order: Neogastropoda
- Superfamily: Conoidea
- Family: Horaiclavidae
- Genus: Aoteadrillia; Powell, 1942

Type species
- Aoteadrillia wanganuiensis Hutton, F.W., 1873

Species
- See text

= Aoteadrillia =

Genus of gastropods

Aoteadrillia is a genus of sea snails, marine gastropod mollusks in the family Horaiclavidae.

It was previously categorized within the subfamily Crassispirinae, Turridae.

== Species ==
Species within the genus Aoteadrillia include:

- † Aoteadrillia alpha (L. C. King, 1933)
- † Aoteadrillia apicarinata (P. Marshall & R. Murdoch, 1923)
- † Aoteadrillia asper (Marwick, 1931)
- Aoteadrillia bulbacea (Watson, 1881)
- † Aoteadrillia callimorpha (Suter, 1917)
- † Aoteadrillia consequens (Laws, 1936)
- † Aoteadrillia exigua (Marwick, 1931)
- Aoteadrillia finlayi Powell, 1942
- † Aoteadrillia ihungia (Marwick, 1931)
- Aoteadrillia otagoensis Powell, 1942
- † Aoteadrillia waihuaensis Powell, 1942
- Aoteadrillia wanganuiensis (Hutton, 1873)

Species brought into synonymy

- Aoteadrillia chordata (Suter, 1908): synonym of Aoteadrillia wanganuiensis (Hutton, 1873)
- Aoteadrillia rawitensis (Hedley, 1922): synonym of Austrodrillia rawitensis Hedley, 1922
- Aoteadrillia thomsoni Powell, 1942: synonym of Aoteadrillia wanganuiensis (Hutton, 1873)
- Aoteadrillia trifida Powell, 1942: synonym of Aoteadrillia wanganuiensis (Hutton, 1873)
