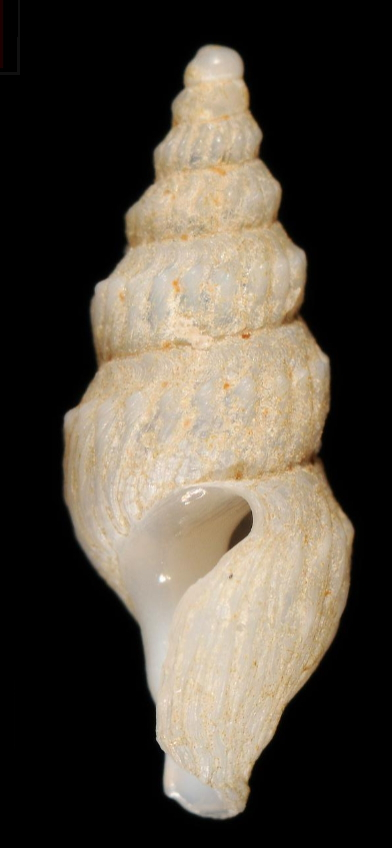
- Shell of Spirotropis studeriana (specimen at the Smithsonian Institution)

Scientific classification
- Kingdom: Animalia
- Phylum: Mollusca
- Class: Gastropoda
- Subclass: Caenogastropoda
- Order: Neogastropoda
- Superfamily: Conoidea
- Family: Drilliidae
- Genus: Spirotropis
- Species: S. studeriana

Binomial name
- Spirotropis studeriana (von Martens, 1878)

Synonyms
- Drillia (Drillia) studeriana (von Martens, 1878); Pleurotoma studeriana Martens, 1878 (basionym); Pleurotoma (Spirotropis) studeriana (von Martens, 1878)

= Spirotropis studeriana =

Species of gastropod

Spirotropis studeriana is a species of sea snail, a marine gastropod mollusk in the family Drilliidae.

== Description ==
The shell of this species grows to a length between 11 mm and 22 mm.

The shell is stouter than Spirotropis patagonica, with a shorter body whorl. The ribs are stronger and fewer, evanescent on the body whorl. The revolving lines are slighter and scarcely apparent. The siphonal canal is shorter and broader.

== Distribution ==
This species occurs in the benthic zone of the cold waters off Argentina and the Kerguelen Islands at depths between 646 m and 845 m.
