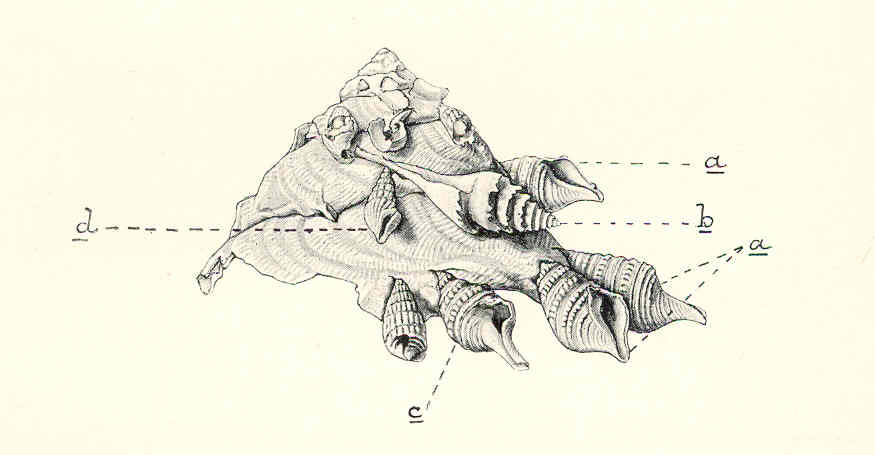
- Drawing of Spirotropis carinata on a specimen of Xenophora pallidula

Scientific classification
- Kingdom: Animalia
- Phylum: Mollusca
- Class: Gastropoda
- Subclass: Caenogastropoda
- Order: Neogastropoda
- Superfamily: Conoidea
- Family: Drilliidae
- Genus: Spirotropis
- Species: S. carinata

Binomial name
- Spirotropis carinata (Bivona, 1838)

Synonyms
- † Drillia carinata (Bivona, 1838); † Pleurotoma acuta Sismonda, 1842; † Pleurotoma carinata Bivona, 1838 (nomen dubium)

= Spirotropis carinata =

Extinct species of gastropod

Spirotropis carinata is a fossil species of sea snail, a marine gastropod mollusk in the family Drilliidae.

== Taxonomy ==
The name Spirotropis carinata has been misapplied to a Recent species from the Atlantic coasts of Europe. The true carinata is a fossil species from the Mediterranean. The valid name for the Recent species is Spirotropis confusa.

== Description ==
The white shell shows whorls slightly excavated above, angulated and carinated on the periphery. The sinus is broad, deep and remarkably distinct, with the upper edge thickened.

== Distribution ==
This fossil species was found in the Mediterranean Sea

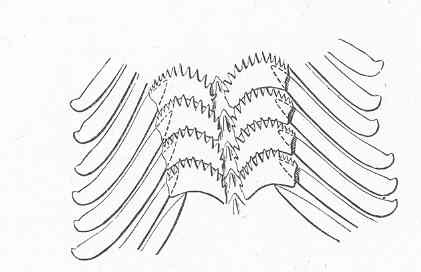
Portion of radula of Spirotropis carinata
