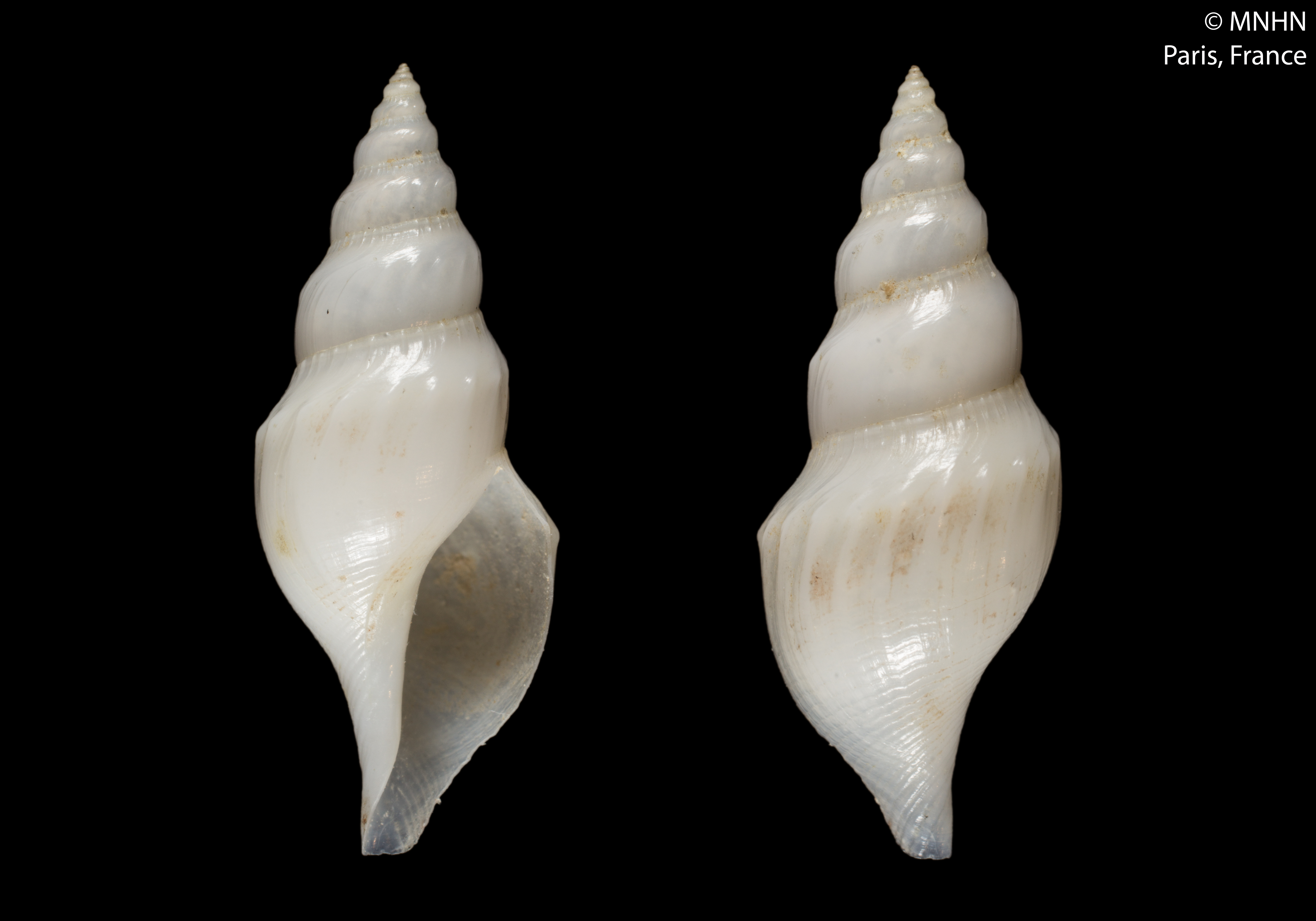
- Shell of Theta chariessa

Scientific classification
- Kingdom: Animalia
- Phylum: Mollusca
- Class: Gastropoda
- Subclass: Caenogastropoda
- Order: Neogastropoda
- Family: Raphitomidae
- Genus: Theta; A. H. Clark, 1959

Type species
- Pleurotomella (Theta) lyronuclea A. H. Clarke, 1959

Synonyms
- Pleurotomella (Theta) A. H. Clarke, 1959 (original rank)

= Theta (gastropod) =

Genus of gastropods

Theta is a genus of sea snails, marine gastropod mollusks in the family Raphitomidae.

== Species ==
Species within the genus Theta include:

- Theta baiocchii Nappo & Pellegrini, 2021
- Theta chariessa (Watson, 1881)
- Theta lyronuclea (Clarke A.H., 1959)
- Theta microcostellata Criscione, Hallan, Puillandre & Fedosov, 2021
- Theta polita Criscione, Hallan, Puillandre & Fedosov, 2021
- Theta spicea (Watson, 1881)
- Theta vayssierei (Dautzenberg, 1925)

Species brought into synonymy

- Theta chrysoplex (Barnard, 1963): synonym of Gymnobela chrysopelex (Barnard, 1963)
- Theta lanceata (Dall, 1927): synonym of Gymnobela lanceata Dall, 1927

Synonyms

- Theta lanceata (Dall, 1927) : synonym of Gymnobela lanceata Dall, 1927
