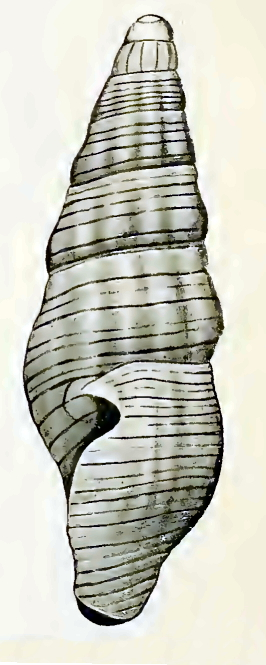
- Original image of a shell of Austrodrillia agrestis

Scientific classification
- Kingdom: Animalia
- Phylum: Mollusca
- Class: Gastropoda
- Subclass: Caenogastropoda
- Order: Neogastropoda
- Superfamily: Conoidea
- Family: Horaiclavidae
- Genus: Austrodrillia
- Species: A. agrestis

Binomial name
- Austrodrillia agrestis (Verco, 1909)

Synonyms
- Drillia agrestis Verco, 1909

= Austrodrillia agrestis =

Species of gastropod

Austrodrillia agrestis is a species of sea snail, a marine gastropod mollusk in the family Horaiclavidae.

It was formerly included within the family Turridae.

== Description ==
The length of the attains 8.5 mm, its diameter 3 mm.

The solid, rugged shell has an elongate-fusiform shape. It contains 7 1/2 whorls, including the protoconch of one whorl and a half, smooth, round, and blunt. The whorls on the spire are sloping, scarcely concave in the upper part, convex in the lower. The suture is distinct, with a narrow adpressed margin. The body whorl is concavely attenuated at the base. The aperture is obliquely oval and shortly contracted posteriorly. The siphonal canal is short, open and barely notched. The outer lip is sharp, slightly ascending at the suture. The posterior sinus is deep, rather narrow, separated from the suture by a distance equal to its width, then convex, with an anterior shallow sinus at the base of the siphonal canal. The inner lip is inconspicuous, applied, smooth, with a callosity at its junction with the outer lip. The sculpture of the first two whorls is closely, regularly, validly, axially costulate, the rest rudely ribbed in the anterior two-thirds. The ribs are oblique, rounded, rather wider than the interspaces, becoming less marked and more distant on the body whorl, and almost absent on the base, about 14 in the penultimate whorl. There are sublenticular accremental incisions. The spiral incisions ai'e deep, irregularly slightly wavy, about 8 in the penultimate whorl, and 20 in the body whorl, nearly equidistant, in places alternately fine and wide. The colour of the shell is uniform light-straw tint.

== Distribution ==
This marine species is endemic to Australia and occurs off South Australia.
