= Spirotropis badensis =

Scientific classification
- Kingdom: Animalia
- Phylum: Mollusca
- Class: Gastropoda
- Subclass: Caenogastropoda
- Order: Neogastropoda
- Superfamily: Conoidea
- Family: Drilliidae
- Genus: Spirotropis
- Species: S. badensis

Binomial name
- Spirotropis badensis R. Janssen, 1993

Synonyms
- Drillia modiola CsepreghyMezneric, 1953; Pleurotoma (Drillia) modiola Hoernes and Auinger 1891; Pleurotoma modiola Hornes 1854; Pleurotoma scalaris Hauer 1837; Spirotropis modiola Strausz 1966; Spirotropis spinescens Bernasconi & Robba, 1985

Extinct species of gastropod

Spirotropis badensis is an extinct species of sea snail, a marine gastropod mollusk in the family Drilliidae.

== Description ==
The length of the shell attains 20 mm, its diameter 8.5 mm.

== Distribution ==
This extinct marine species was found in Middle Miocene strata in the Vienna Basin, Austria.
