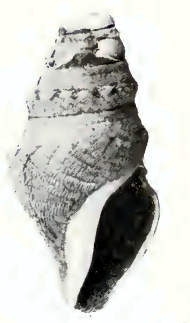
- Original image of a shell of Spirotropis cymothoe

Scientific classification
- Kingdom: Animalia
- Phylum: Mollusca
- Class: Gastropoda
- Subclass: Caenogastropoda
- Order: Neogastropoda
- Superfamily: Conoidea
- Family: Drilliidae
- Genus: Spirotropis
- Species: S. cymothoe

Binomial name
- Spirotropis cymothoe (W. H. Dall, 1919)

Synonyms
- Cryptogemma cymothoë W. H. Dall, 1919

= Spirotropis cymothoe =

Species of gastropod

Spirotropis cymothoe is a species of sea snail, a marine gastropod mollusk in the family Drilliidae.

== Description ==
The length of the (decollated) shell attains 9 mm, its diameter 5 mm.

(Original description) The shell much resembles Cryptogemma calypso Dall, 1919, from which it differs by having the anal fasciole striated spirally, the surface in front of the shoulder without spiral sculpture and minutely vermiculate, the ribs more knob-like, shorter, and averaging about 12 on the body whorl. The shell contains 6 whorls. The apex is always eroded.

== Distribution ==
This marine species occurs in the Pacific Ocean off San Diego, Lower California at a depth of 650 m.
