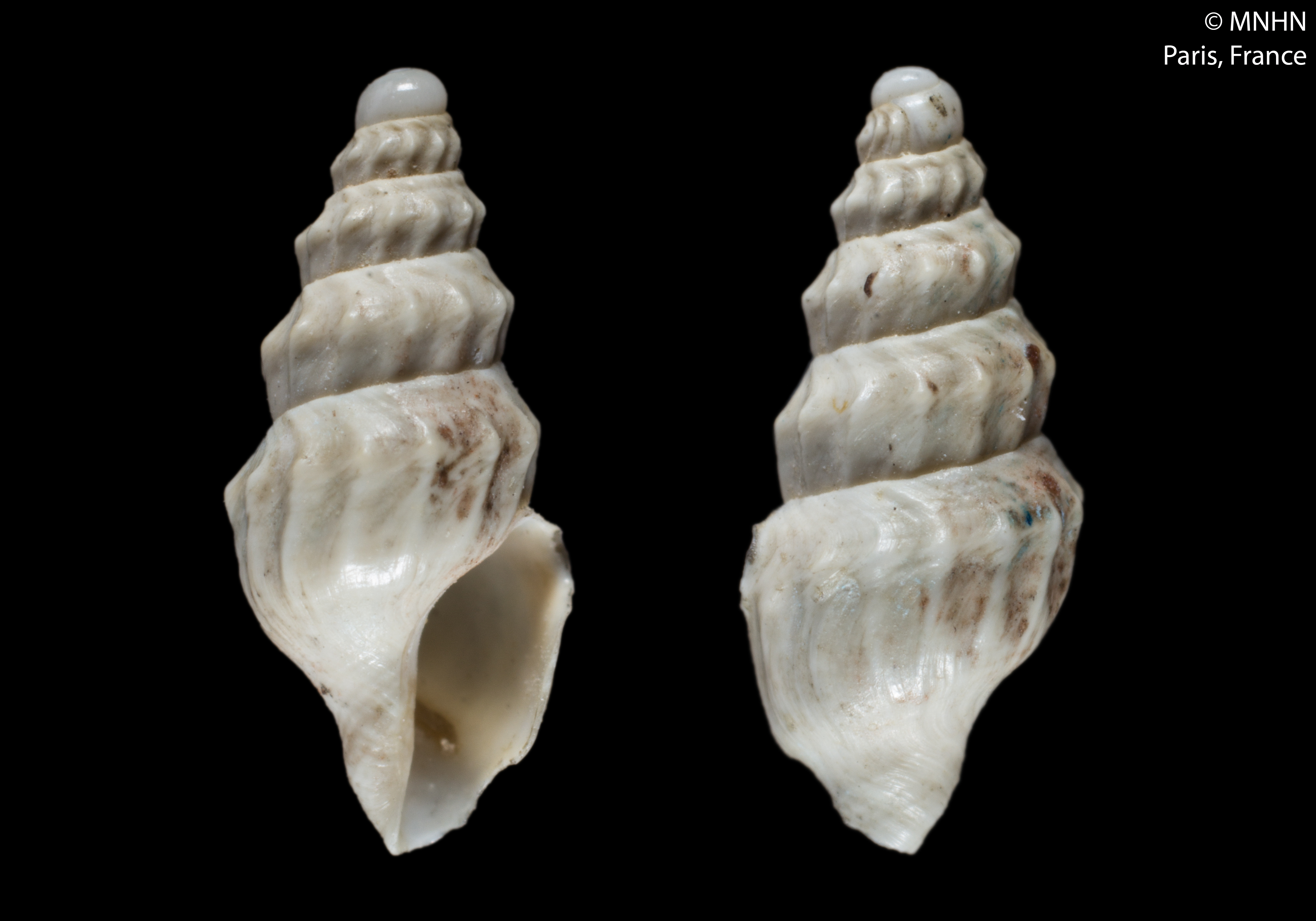
- Shell of Micropleurotoma travailleuri (lectotype at MNHN, Paris)

Scientific classification
- Kingdom: Animalia
- Phylum: Mollusca
- Class: Gastropoda
- Subclass: Caenogastropoda
- Order: Neogastropoda
- Superfamily: Conoidea
- Family: Horaiclavidae
- Genus: Micropleurotoma
- Species: M. travailleuri

Binomial name
- Micropleurotoma travailleuri Bouchet & Warén, 1980

Synonyms
- Pleurotoma obtusum Locard, 1897

= Micropleurotoma travailleuri =

Species of gastropod

Micropleurotoma travailleuri is a species of sea snail, a marine gastropod mollusk in the family Horaiclavidae.

== Description ==
The length of the shell attains 10 mm.

== Distribution ==
This marine species occurs in the Atlantic Ocean off Madeira at bathyal depths.
