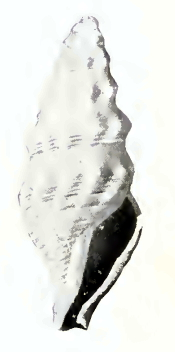
- Original image of a shell of Spirotropis laodice

Scientific classification
- Kingdom: Animalia
- Phylum: Mollusca
- Class: Gastropoda
- Subclass: Caenogastropoda
- Order: Neogastropoda
- Superfamily: Conoidea
- Family: Drilliidae
- Genus: Spirotropis
- Species: S. laodice

Binomial name
- Spirotropis laodice (Dall, 1919)

Synonyms
- Mangilia laodice Dall, 1919

= Spirotropis laodice =

Species of gastropod

Spirotropis laodice is a species of sea snail, a marine gastropod mollusk in the family Drilliidae.

In 1971 McLean put this species in the genus Spirotropis

== Description ==
The length of the shell attains 7.7 mm, its diameter 3.5 mm.

(Original description) The small, thin, white shell contains six well-rounded whorls exclusive of the (lost) protoconch. The suture is appressed, distinct, undulated by the sculpture. The spiral sculpture is variable sometimes with well marked threads (six on the body whorl) and a finer intercalary thread in the rather wide interspaces, and sometimes with the spirals obsolete or absent. When present the suture may have a thickened edge with one thread on the preceding whorl immediately behind it, or it may be quite simple. The axial sculpture consists of (on the penultimate whorl about a dozen) short, subnodulous, slightly oblique ribs which do not cross the anal fasciole and become obsolete on the base, separated by narrower interspaces. The anal fascioleis slightly excavated, smooth except for incremental arcuate lines close to the suture. The aperture is narrow. The anal sulcus is wide and deep. The outer lip is thin, sharp and prominently arcuately produced. The inner lip is erased. The short columella is attenuated in front and gyrate. The axis is pervious. The siphonal canal is narrow, short and slightly recurved.

== Distribution ==
This species occurs in the demersal zone of the Pacific Ocean off Ecuador.
