= Naudedrillia mitromorpha =

Scientific classification
- Kingdom: Animalia
- Phylum: Mollusca
- Class: Gastropoda
- Subclass: Caenogastropoda
- Order: Neogastropoda
- Superfamily: Conoidea
- Family: Pseudomelatomidae
- Genus: Naudedrillia
- Species: N. mitromorpha

Binomial name
- Naudedrillia mitromorpha Kilburn, 1988

Species of gastropod

Naudedrillia mitromorpha is a species of sea snail, a marine gastropod mollusk in the family Pseudomelatomidae, the turrids and allies.

== Distribution ==
This marine species occurs off Transkei, South Africa.
