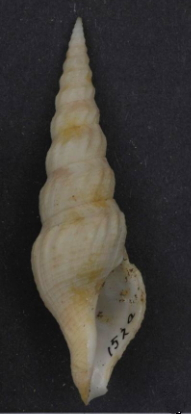
- Naudedrillia praetermissa

Scientific classification
- Kingdom: Animalia
- Phylum: Mollusca
- Class: Gastropoda
- Subclass: Caenogastropoda
- Order: Neogastropoda
- Superfamily: Conoidea
- Family: Pseudomelatomidae
- Genus: Naudedrillia; Kilburn, 1988

Type species
- Naudedrillia nealyoungi Kilburn, 1988

Species
- See text

= Naudedrillia =

Genus of gastropods

Naudedrillia is a genus of sea snails, marine gastropod mollusks in the family Pseudomelatomidae.

== Species ==
Species within the genus Naudedrillia include:

- Naudedrillia angulata Kilburn, 1988
- Naudedrillia cerea Kilburn, 1988
- Naudedrillia filosa Kilburn, 1988
- Naudedrillia hayesi Kilburn, 2005
- Naudedrillia mitromorpha Kilburn, 1988
- Naudedrillia nealyoungi Kilburn, 1988
- Naudedrillia perardua Kilburn, 1988
- Naudedrillia praetermissa (Smith E. A., 1904)
