= Aoteadrillia finlayi =

Scientific classification
- Kingdom: Animalia
- Phylum: Mollusca
- Class: Gastropoda
- Subclass: Caenogastropoda
- Order: Neogastropoda
- Superfamily: Conoidea
- Family: Horaiclavidae
- Genus: Aoteadrillia
- Species: A. finlayi

Binomial name
- Aoteadrillia finlayi A.W.B. Powell, 1942

Species of gastropod

Aoteadrillia finlayi is a species of sea snail, a marine gastropod mollusk in the family Horaiclavidae.

== Description ==
The length of the shell attains 10 mm.

== Distribution ==
This marine species is endemic to New Zealand and occurs off Ninety Mile Beach, North Island.
