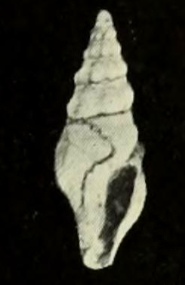
- Shell of † Aoteadrillia callimorpha (holotype)

Scientific classification
- Kingdom: Animalia
- Phylum: Mollusca
- Class: Gastropoda
- Subclass: Caenogastropoda
- Order: Neogastropoda
- Superfamily: Conoidea
- Family: Horaiclavidae
- Genus: Aoteadrillia
- Species: †A. callimorpha

Binomial name
- †Aoteadrillia callimorpha (Suter, 1917)

Synonyms
- † Drillia callimorpha Suter, 1917

= Aoteadrillia callimorpha =

Extinct species of gastropod

Aoteadrillia callimorpha is an extinct species of sea snail, a marine gastropod mollusk in the family Horaiclavidae.

== Description ==
The length of the shell attains 11.5 mm, its diameter 4 mm.

(Original description) The small shell is narrowly fusoid and turriculate. It is axially costat and spirally lirate on the lower half of the whorls. The siphonal canal is short. The sinus is not deep, situated below the suture on the excavation of the whorl.

Sculpture: the protoconch is smooth. The following whorls show thick convex axial ribs, 10 on a whorl, discontinuous over the whorls, and not extending to the suture above. The interstices are narrower than the ribs. The lower half of the whorls show 4 to 5 spiral threads. On the body whorl the spirals are present down to the end of the beak. The suture is lightly margined below.

The spire is turriculate and conic. Its heightis about 14 that of the aperture with siphonal canal, angle 30°. The protoconch consists of 2 convex whorls. The nucleus is obtuse and slightly tilted.The shell contains 7 whorls, regularly increasing, with a slightly concave shoulder, convex below the angle. The body whorl is conve and is contracted towards the base. The suture is well impresse and, margined below. The aperture is narrowly pyriform, slightly channelled above, extending below into a short open siphonal canal, its base truncated. The outer lip is convex and acute, but strengthened on the outside by an axial riblet, advancing at the middle, with a rounded not deep sinus below the suture, its upper margin slightly antecurrent. The columella is vertical, rounde and, somewhat inflected below. The inner lipis narrow, callous, smooth and tapesg to a point below.

== Distribution ==
This extinct marine species was endemic to New Zealand.
