= Spirotropis gramensis =

Scientific classification
- Kingdom: Animalia
- Phylum: Mollusca
- Class: Gastropoda
- Subclass: Caenogastropoda
- Order: Neogastropoda
- Superfamily: Conoidea
- Family: Drilliidae
- Genus: Spirotropis
- Species: †S. gramensis

Binomial name
- †Spirotropis gramensis R. Janssen, 1993

Synonyms
- Pleurotoma modiola von Koenen; Drillia (Spirotropis) modiola Rasmussen; Spirotropis modiola Rasmussen; Spirotropis modiola Bernasconi & Robba

Extinct species of gastropod

Spirotropis gramensis is an extinct species of sea snail, a marine gastropod mollusk in the family Drilliidae.

== Distribution ==
Fossils of this species were found in the Gram Formation, Gramian, South Jutland, Denmark. It dates from the Late Miocene of Denmark and Belgium; age range: 11.608 to 7.246 Ma
