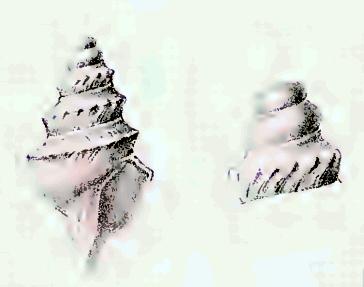
- Shell and protoconch of Micropleurotoma melvilli

Scientific classification
- Kingdom: Animalia
- Phylum: Mollusca
- Class: Gastropoda
- Subclass: Caenogastropoda
- Order: Neogastropoda
- Superfamily: Conoidea
- Family: Horaiclavidae
- Genus: Micropleurotoma; Thiele, 1929

Type species
- Pleurotoma spirotropoides Thiele, 1925<

Species
- See text

= Micropleurotoma =

Genus of gastropods

Micropleurotoma is a genus of sea snails, marine gastropod mollusks in the family Horaiclavidae.

== Species ==
Species within the genus Micropleurotoma include:

- Micropleurotoma melvilli (Sykes, 1906)
- Micropleurotoma remota (Powell, 1958)
- Micropleurotoma spirotropoides (Thiele, 1925)
- Micropleurotoma travailleuri Bouchet & Warén, 1980
