= Aoteadrillia otagoensis =

Scientific classification
- Kingdom: Animalia
- Phylum: Mollusca
- Class: Gastropoda
- Subclass: Caenogastropoda
- Order: Neogastropoda
- Superfamily: Conoidea
- Family: Horaiclavidae
- Genus: Aoteadrillia
- Species: A. otagoensis

Binomial name
- Aoteadrillia otagoensis A.W.B. Powell, 1942

Species of gastropod

Aoteadrillia otagoensis is a species of sea snail, a marine gastropod mollusk in the family Horaiclavidae.

It was formerly included within the family Turridae.

== Distribution ==
This marine species is endemic to New Zealand and occurs off Ninety Mile Beach, North Island.
