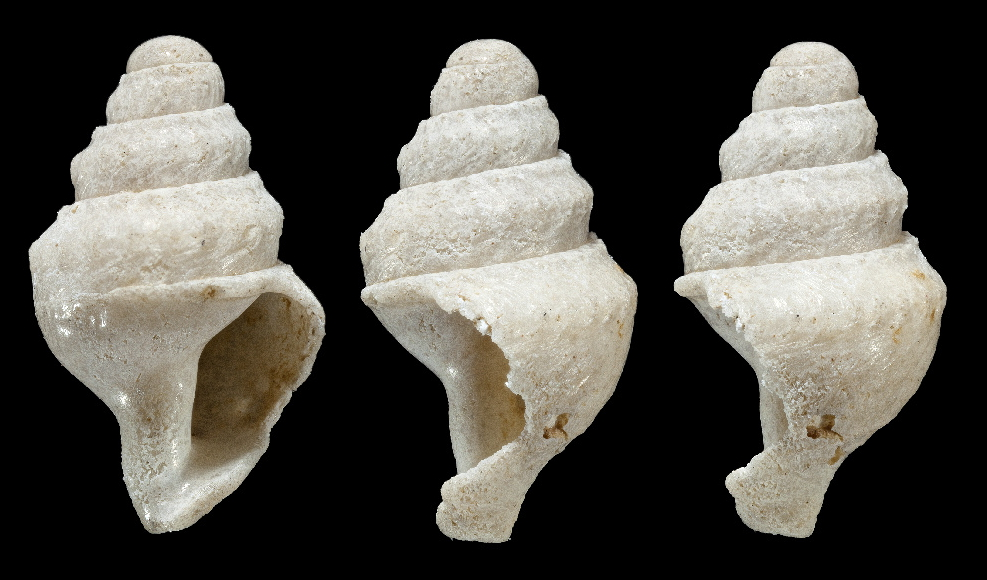
- Shell of Theta spicea (specimen at Nathural History Museum, London)

Scientific classification
- Kingdom: Animalia
- Phylum: Mollusca
- Class: Gastropoda
- Subclass: Caenogastropoda
- Order: Neogastropoda
- Family: Raphitomidae
- Genus: Theta
- Species: T. spicea

Binomial name
- Theta spicea (R. B. Watson, 1881)

Synonyms
- Gymnobela (Theta) spicea (R.B. Watson, 1881); Pleurotoma (Drillia) spicea R.B. Watson, 1881 (original combination)

= Theta spicea =

Species of gastropod

Theta spicea is a species of sea snail, a marine gastropod mollusk in the family Raphitomidae.

== Description ==
The length of the shell attains 6.4 mm.

(Original description) The shell is short and broad, biconical, scalar, angulated, without ribs, but with tubercles at the angle, and feeble spiral threads on the base. The siphonal canal is small and lop-sided.

Sculpture: Longitudinals— there are none but very fine, unequal, hairlike lines of growth. Spirals —immediately below the suture is a minute collar of very small, high, round, remote tubercles, whose sutural surface at right angles to the axis is perfectly flat. This collar is strongest on the earlier whorls. Below this is a sloping, flat, or slightly concave shoulder. A little above the middle of the whorls is a rectangular angulation beset with small, remote, slightly elongated, sharpish tubercles, which give the appearance of a sharply expressed keel. Of these tubercles there are about twenty-seven on the body whorl. But they diminish rapidly up the spire. The base of the body whorl is defined by a small rounded thread, which forms a feeble keel. It lies quite below the origin of the outer lip. A little remotely below it lie two or three others, rather weaker, but prominent, widely parted, rounded threads, with four or five similar ones on the siphonal canal, of which the last one or two are stronger than the others.

The colour of the shell is polished porcellaneous white.

The spire is scalar and stumpily conical, with its profile-lines much interrupted by the constriction of the sutures. The apex consists of two embryonic whorls. It is large and dome-shaped, having the extreme tip quite immersed and the suture almost suppressed. The shell contains 5½ whorls in all (but the specimen is immature). They are short and broad, of rather rapid increase, with a broad horizontal shoulder and a sharp carinated angle, below which they are cylindrical with a slight contraction to the lower suture. The last is broadest at the keel, a little contracted below this point, tumid on the base, drawn in at the columella, with a small, short sharp-pointed, siphonal canal. The suture is very strong and distinct, from the concave curve of the whorl above it and the horizontal tabulation of the collar below.

The aperture is largish, angularly pear-shaped. The outer lip thin, angulated, straight and horizontal above, convex and patulous below the angle, drawn in at the siphonal canal. It retreats at once on leaving the body to form the rather deep, narrow, rounded sinus which occupies the shoulder. Below this it descends very little, but runs out into a very convex curved edge, whose prominence is greatly increased by the rapidity and extent of the retreat of the lip-edge at the siphonal canal. The inner lip is narrowly excavated in the substance of the shell on the body and down the columella. It has a convex contour across the body, at the junction of which and the columella is a strong but rounded angle. The columella is short, strong, conical, obliquely truncated in front, with a sharp, rounded, twisted edge.

== Distribution ==
This marine species occurs in the Atlantic Ocean off Northeast Brazil.
