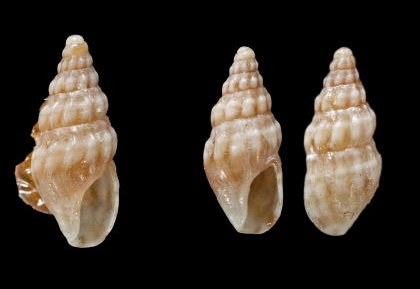
- Shell of Austrodrillia albobalteata (specimen at the Natural History Museum, London)

Scientific classification
- Kingdom: Animalia
- Phylum: Mollusca
- Class: Gastropoda
- Subclass: Caenogastropoda
- Order: Neogastropoda
- Superfamily: Conoidea
- Family: Horaiclavidae
- Genus: Austrodrillia
- Species: A. albobalteata

Binomial name
- Austrodrillia albobalteata (E. A. Smith, 1890)

Synonyms
- Pleurotoma (Clavus) albobalteata E. A. Smith, 1890 (basionym)

= Austrodrillia albobalteata =

Species of gastropod

Austrodrillia albobalteata is a species of sea snail, a marine gastropod mollusk in the family Horaiclavidae.

It was formerly included within the family Turridae.

== Description ==
The length of the shell attains 5 mm, its diameter 2 mm.

This small, brownish shell has a fusiform-ovate shape. It contains 6 whorls, including two convex whorls in the protoconch. It shows 10-12 ribs, Their superior part is almost obsolete and they are almost indistinctly subnodose at the sutures. The oval aperture is small. The outer lip is sharp, slightly ascending at the suture. There is a white band on the body whorl. It is subdivided by a fine line of the same colour as the rest of the shell. A few wavy darker brown lines flow down the lower portion of the body whorl.

== Distribution ==
This marine species occurs in the Atlantic Ocean off St. Helena.
