= Spirotropis eurytima =

Scientific classification
- Kingdom: Animalia
- Phylum: Mollusca
- Class: Gastropoda
- Subclass: Caenogastropoda
- Order: Neogastropoda
- Family: Drilliidae
- Genus: Spirotropis
- Species: S. eurytima

Binomial name
- Spirotropis eurytima Morassi, 1998

Species of gastropod

Spirotropis eurytima is a species of sea snail, a marine gastropod mollusk in the family Drilliidae.

== Description ==
The length of the shell attains 16 mm.

The shell is slender and fusiform, with a high, turreted spire. The protoconch is smooth and consists of about 1.5 whorls. The teleoconch is composed of up to 8 moderately convex whorls. The shell's sculpture features numerous, fine spiral threads crossed by weak, obsolete axial ribs that are most noticeable on the upper whorls. The suture is well-defined. The aperture is ovate, leading to a moderately long and open siphonal canal. The overall color of the shell is a whitish or pale fawn.

== Distribution ==
This marine species occurs in the demersal zone of the Gulf of Aden at depths ranging from 150 to 250 meters.
