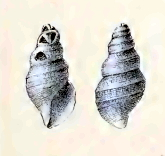
- Original image of a shell of Spirotropis aganactica

Scientific classification
- Kingdom: Animalia
- Phylum: Mollusca
- Class: Gastropoda
- Subclass: Caenogastropoda
- Order: Neogastropoda
- Superfamily: Conoidea
- Family: Drilliidae
- Genus: Spirotropis
- Species: S. aganactica

Binomial name
- Spirotropis aganactica (Watson, 1886)

Synonyms
- Pleurotoma (Spirotropis) aganactica Watson, 1886 (basionym)

= Spirotropis aganactica =

Species of gastropod

Spirotropis aganactica is a species of sea snail, a marine gastropod mollusk in the family Drilliidae.

Clarke (1962) put this species in the genus Spirotropis.

== Description ==
The shell grows to a length of 25 mm.

(Original description) The thin, long, narrow, white shell is feebly double-keeled. It is spiralled, with a short rounded base. It shows a broad, short, lop-sided snout, high conical spire, and slightly angularly impressed suture. The longitudinal sculpture shows nothing but lines of growth in slight puckerings. The spiral sculpture (with the exception of the subsutural area) has the surface scored with slight broadish threads with feeble furrows. Two of the threads stronger are than the rest, and about 2.5 mm apart. They lie at the periphery, and form a blunt double-keel on the whorls. Under the lower one and within the contraction of the base is another thread not quite so strong as either of these two. The colour of the shell is white, but the shell is very much weathered. The spire is tall and conical. All the upper whorls of the spire in the apex are gone. Only 3.5 whorls remain. The last is small, but is a little tumid, with a short rounded base and a very short lop-sided snout. The suture is rather oblique, well marked by the angulation of the whorls and by a slight contraction of the whorl just above. The aperture is elongately oval and rather small. The outer lip is thin and well arched. The sinus is strong, but very open. It lies near the suture with a triangular shelf above it. The inner lip spreads with a broad thin glaze on the body. Its line is concave. The columella is short, slightly oblique, and is shortly cut off, with a slight twist at the point.

== Distribution ==
This abyssal species occurs in the demersal zone of the Mid Atlantic at a depth of 3,475 m.
