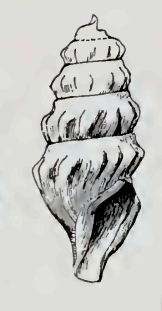
- Original image of a shell of Spirotropis genilda

Scientific classification
- Kingdom: Animalia
- Phylum: Mollusca
- Class: Gastropoda
- Subclass: Caenogastropoda
- Order: Neogastropoda
- Superfamily: Conoidea
- Family: Drilliidae
- Genus: Spirotropis
- Species: S. genilda

Binomial name
- Spirotropis genilda (Dall, 1908)

Synonyms
- Mangelia genilda (Dall, 1908); Mangilia genilda Dall, 1908 (basionym)

= Spirotropis genilda =

Species of gastropod

Spirotropis genilda is a species of sea snail, a marine gastropod mollusk in the family Drilliidae.

== Description ==
The shell measures 10.5 mm in length and 4.6 mm in diameter.

(Original description) The small, white shell comprises approximately six whorls, excluding the (lost) protoconch. The suture is distinct, and the whorl in front of it is slightly turgid, with the anal fasciole being more or less constricted in front of it. At the shoulder, there are about fifteen short, very obliquely protractive, wave-like ribs with narrower interspaces, which are only conspicuous near the periphery. The surface is otherwise smooth, except for faint incremental lines. The aperture is lunate, and the anal sulcus is wide and shallow. The outer lip is sharp, thin and arcuately produced in front of the sulcus. The body is polished. The columella is short, gyrate, impervious and obliquely truncate in front. The siphonal canal is very short, wide, and slightly recurved. There is no operculum on the holotype.

== Distribution ==
This species occurs in the demersal zone of the Gulf of Panama at a depth of 2300 m.
