= Aoteadrillia ihungia =

Scientific classification
- Kingdom: Animalia
- Phylum: Mollusca
- Class: Gastropoda
- Subclass: Caenogastropoda
- Order: Neogastropoda
- Superfamily: Conoidea
- Family: Horaiclavidae
- Genus: Aoteadrillia
- Species: A. ihungia

Binomial name
- Aoteadrillia ihungia (Marwick, 1931)

Extinct species of gastropod

Aoteadrillia ihungia is an extinct species of sea snail, a marine gastropod mollusk in the family Horaiclavidae.

== Distribution ==
This extinct marine species was endemic to New Zealand.
