= Austrodrillia secunda =

Scientific classification
- Kingdom: Animalia
- Phylum: Mollusca
- Class: Gastropoda
- Subclass: Caenogastropoda
- Order: Neogastropoda
- Superfamily: Conoidea
- Family: Horaiclavidae
- Genus: Austrodrillia
- Species: A. secunda

Binomial name
- Austrodrillia secunda Powell, 1965

Synonyms
- Austrodrillia (Regidrillia) secunda Powell, 1965 · accepted, alternate representation

Species of gastropod

Austrodrillia secunda is a species of sea snail, a marine gastropod mollusk in the family Horaiclavidae.

It was formerly included within the family Turridae.

== Distribution ==
This marine species is endemic to New Zealand.
