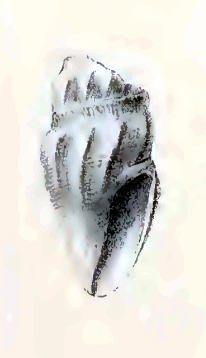
- Original image of a (partial) shell of Spirotropis tmeta

Scientific classification
- Kingdom: Animalia
- Phylum: Mollusca
- Class: Gastropoda
- Subclass: Caenogastropoda
- Order: Neogastropoda
- Superfamily: Conoidea
- Family: Drilliidae
- Genus: Spirotropis
- Species: S. tmeta

Binomial name
- Spirotropis tmeta (Watson, 1881)

Synonyms
- Drillia tmeta ' (Watson, 1881); Pleurotoma tmeta Watson, 1881 (basionym); Pleurotoma (Spirotropis) tmeta (Watson, 1881); Spirotropis meta R.B. Watson, 1881; Typhlomangelia tmeta (Watson, 1881)

= Spirotropis tmeta =

Species of gastropod

Spirotropis tmeta is a species of sea snail, a marine gastropod mollusk in the family Drilliidae.

== Description ==
(Original description) The incomplete shell of the holotype consists of a mere fragment of two whorls, but with very marked features. It is evidently high and narrow, with short and numerous whorls, which are sharply but broadly angulated very much above the middle. The shoulder above the angulation is scored by very many sharp curved threads, the scars of the old sinus. The rise of these forms a collar below the suture, which is thus distinct. The angulation is raised into a keel by rounded tubercles, which are the origin of narrow, curved, very oblique ribs, of which there are twelve on the body whorl. They extend to the base, but not to the snout, which is very small and short. The whole surface is closely scored by fine, rounded, spiral threads. The sinus of the outer lip is separated from the body by a narrow shelf, and is shallow, rounded, and open on the under side, where the convex shoulder of the lip lies very low. The narrow inner lip has a small pad above, is rather oblique and concave in the middle. The front of the columella is very slightly truncated obliquely, and has a sharply rounded and hardly twisted edge. The aperture is long, narrow, and oblique.

== Distribution ==
This species occurs in the demersal zone of the tropical Western Atlantic Ocean (found off Pernambuco at a depth of 640 m.)
