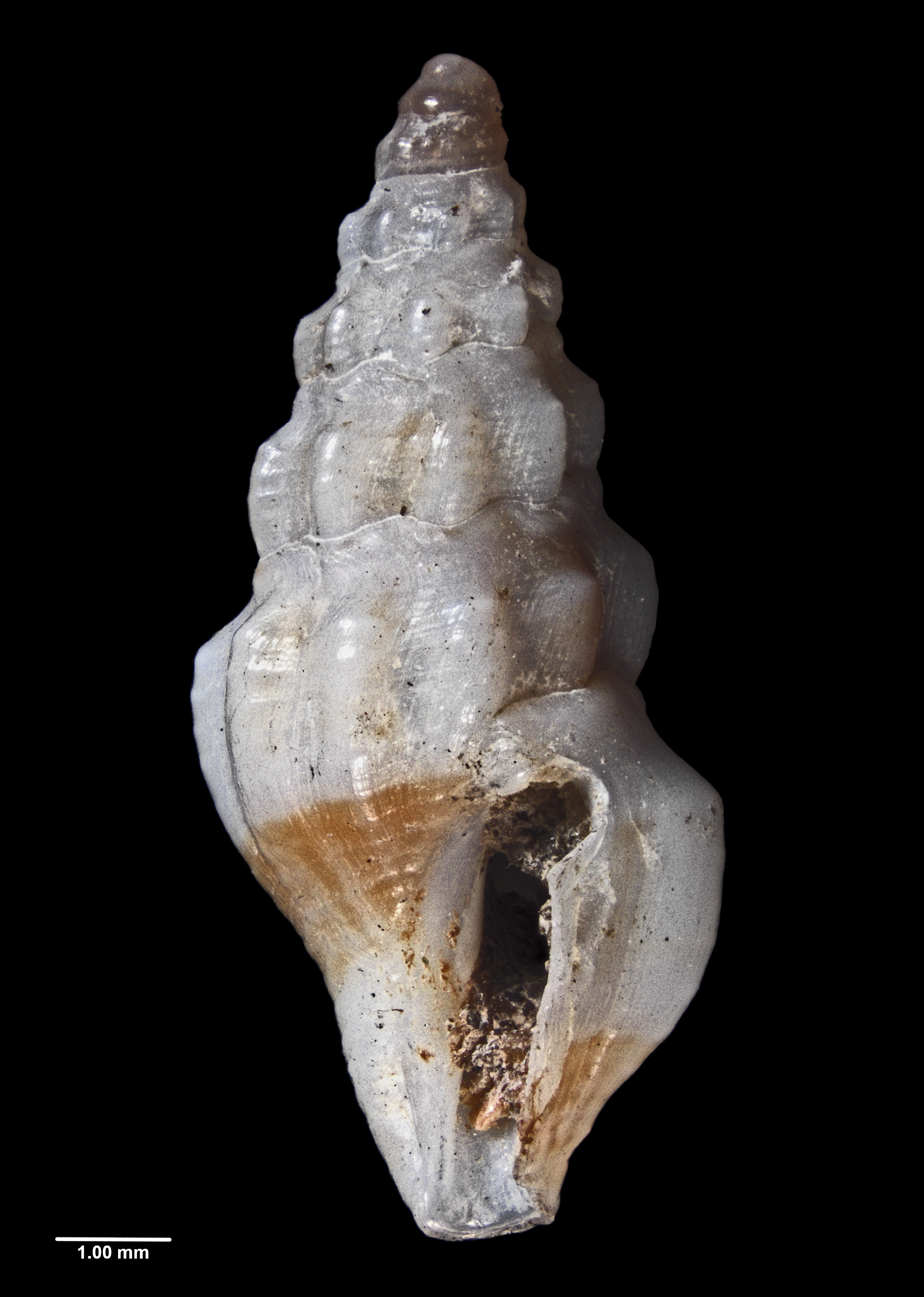

Scientific classification
- Kingdom: Animalia
- Phylum: Mollusca
- Class: Gastropoda
- Subclass: Caenogastropoda
- Order: Neogastropoda
- Superfamily: Conoidea
- Family: Horaiclavidae
- Genus: Austrodrillia
- Species: A. sola

Binomial name
- Austrodrillia sola Powell, 1942

Synonyms
- Austrodrillia (Regidrillia) sola Powell, 1942 · accepted, alternate representation

= Austrodrillia sola =

Species of gastropod

Austrodrillia sola is a species of sea snail, a marine gastropod mollusk in the family Horaiclavidae.

It was formerly included within the family Turridae, the turrids.

== Distribution ==
This marine species is endemic to New Zealand and occurs off Ninety Mile Beach, North Island
