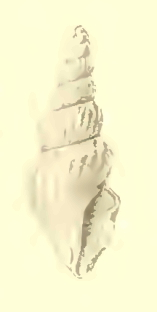
- Original image of a shell of Spirotropis limula

Scientific classification
- Kingdom: Animalia
- Phylum: Mollusca
- Class: Gastropoda
- Subclass: Caenogastropoda
- Order: Neogastropoda
- Superfamily: Conoidea
- Family: Drilliidae
- Genus: Spirotropis
- Species: S. limula

Binomial name
- Spirotropis limula Martens, 1904

= Spirotropis limula =

Species of gastropod

Spirotropis limula is a species of sea snail, a marine gastropod mollusk in the family Drilliidae.

== Description ==
The length of the shell attains 11.6 mm, its diameter 4 mm.

== Distribution ==
This species occurs in the demersal zone of the Mid Indian Ridge, Southern Indian Ocean, at a depth of 500 m.
