= Spirotropis ephamilla =

Scientific classification
- Kingdom: Animalia
- Phylum: Mollusca
- Class: Gastropoda
- Subclass: Caenogastropoda
- Order: Neogastropoda
- Superfamily: Conoidea
- Family: Drilliidae
- Genus: Spirotropis
- Species: S. ephamilla

Binomial name
- Spirotropis ephamilla Verrill, 1884

Synonyms
- Pleurotoma ephamilla (Verrill, 1884)

Species of gastropod

Spirotropis ephamilla is a species of sea snail, a marine gastropod mollusk in the family Drilliidae.

== Description ==
The shell grows to a length of 25 mm, its diameter 10 mm.

(Original description) The shell has an elongated-fusiform shape, with a high, somewhat turreted spire, and a moderately elongated, slightly curved siphonal canal. The posterior sinus is situated considerably below the suture, close to the shoulder. The whorls are moderately convex and strongly angulated near the middle. Below the suture is a broad, flattened or slightly concave subsutural band, covered with coarse and slightly raised spiral lines, with a series of small, rounded nodules close to the suture, and crossed by strongly excurved, sinuous lines of growth, parallel to the edge of the posterior sinus, and receding most at the shoulder, where there are usually two raised cinguli, or small carinae. These are more strongly marked than the others, and bear each a series of small, rounded nodules where they are crossed by the stronger lines of growth. Sometimes these nodules are present only on the uppermost of these two carina, which are separated by a narrow interspace. Below the carinae the whorl rapidly decreases in size. The anterior slope is nearly the same as the posterior one, and of about the same breadth on the spire. This portion of the whorl is crossed by three to five rather coarse, raised, irregular spiral lines, and numerous fine lines of growth, which bend abruptly forward at the shoulder and then curve obliquely downward and forward, crossing both the spiral lines and their interspaces, which are about the same in breadth. On the body whorl the spiral lines cover the whole surface below the shoulder, becoming coarser and farther apart below the middle, and again becoming smaller and closer together on the base of the siphon. The aperture is narrow-ovate and somewhat angulated by the shoulder. The outer lip is sharp-edged, with a rather broad and deep posterior sinus, which is deepest at the shoulder. Below the shoulder the lip projects forward in a broad even curve to near the base of the siphonal canal, where it is somewhat contracted. The siphonal canal is moderately long, somewhat contracted at the base, and a little sinuous. The columella has a strong sinuous curvature, and is strongly excavated at the widest part of the aperture. The upper whorls and the nucleus are eroded in our examples. The epidermis is yellowish horn color and closely adherent. The shell is bluish white within the aperture. The operculum is well-developed, ovate and dark horn-colored.

== Distribution ==
This species occurs in the demersal zone of the Atlantic Ocean off New England.
