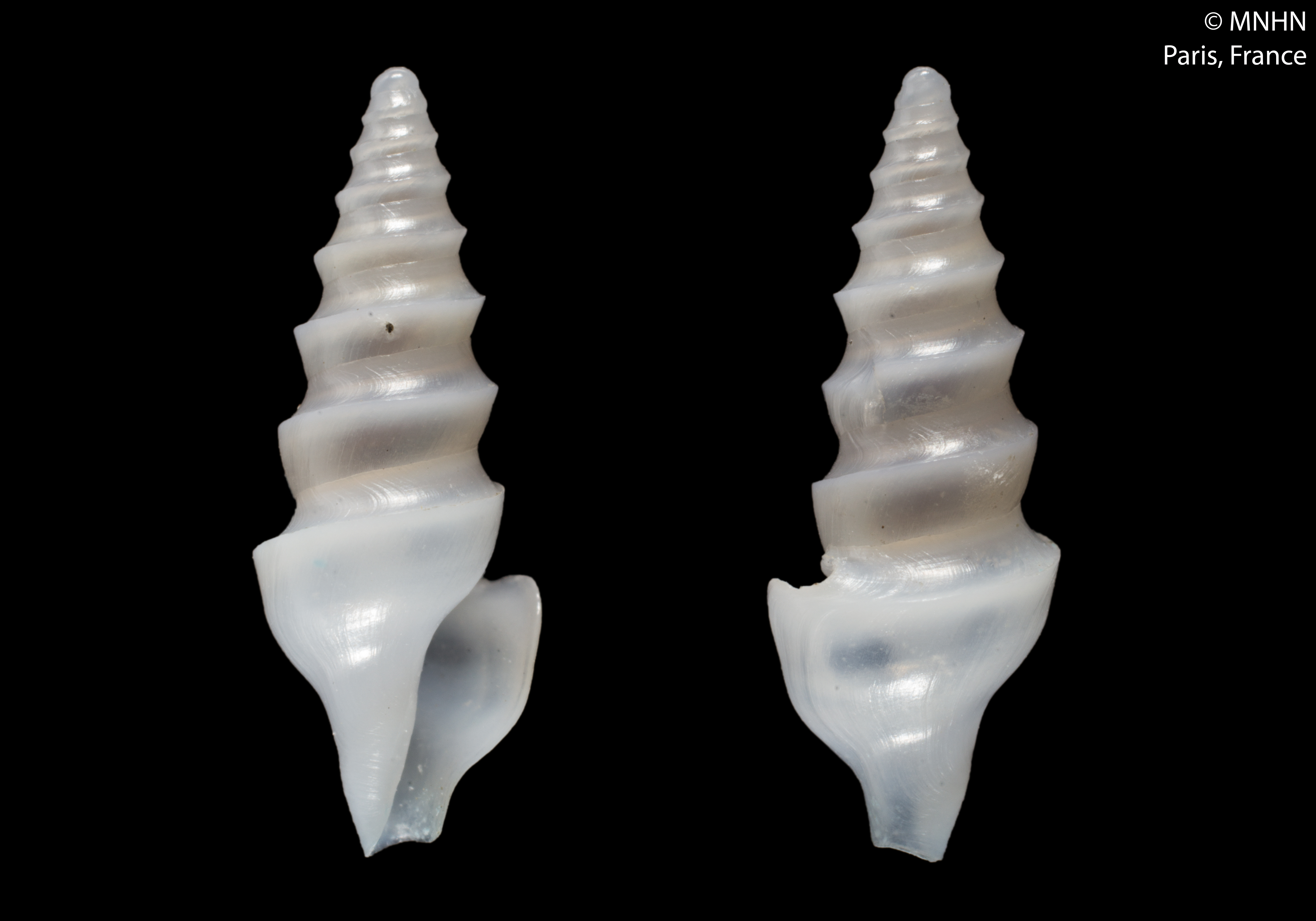
- Shell of Spirotropis azorica

Scientific classification
- Kingdom: Animalia
- Phylum: Mollusca
- Class: Gastropoda
- Subclass: Caenogastropoda
- Order: Neogastropoda
- Family: Drilliidae
- Genus: Spirotropis
- Species: S. azorica

Binomial name
- Spirotropis azorica Bouchet & Warén, 1980

Synonyms
- Spirotropis azoricus Bouchet & Warén, 1980

= Spirotropis azorica =

Species of gastropod

Spirotropis azorica is a species of sea snail, a marine gastropod mollusk in the family Drilliidae.

== Description ==
The shell grows to a length of 11 mm.

== Distribution ==
This marine species occurs in the demersal zone off the Azores at a depth of 330 m.
