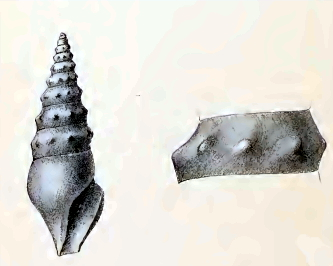
- Original image of a shell (and close-up) of Spirotropis lithocolleta

Scientific classification
- Kingdom: Animalia
- Phylum: Mollusca
- Class: Gastropoda
- Subclass: Caenogastropoda
- Order: Neogastropoda
- Superfamily: Conoidea
- Family: Drilliidae
- Genus: Spirotropis
- Species: S. lithocolleta

Binomial name
- Spirotropis lithocolleta (R.B. Watson, 1881)

Synonyms
- Daphnella lithocolleta (Watson, 1881); Daphnella (Raphitoma) lithocolleta (Watson, 1881); Drillia lithocolleta (Watson, 1881); Pleurotoma (Raphitoma) lithocolleta Watson, 1881 (basionym); Pleurotoma (Typhlomangelia) lithocolleta Watson, 1881

= Spirotropis lithocolleta =

Species of gastropod

Spirotropis lithocolleta is a species of sea snail, a marine gastropod mollusk in the family Drilliidae.

== Description ==
The size of an adult shell varies between 10 mm and 16.5 mm.

(Original description) The high, narrow, conical shell has a short base and a blunt apex. It is bluntly angulated and tubercled, thin, smooth, ivory-white. There is no longitudinal sculpture but very fine scratch-like lines of growth. Behind and parallel to the lip-edge there are three narrow sickle-shaped ribs, which are probably an accidental feature. Very slightly above the middle of the whorls runs a feeble angulation set with round but a little narrowed and obliquely elongated knobs, of which there are about 12 on each whorl. On the first regular whorl there are about 10. Before the end of the penultimate they have quite died out, and even the angulation of the whorl tends to disappear. There are faint traces of microscopic spirals over the whole shell, rather in the texture than on the surface. These are rather more distinct below the suture. And in the sinus-area there are two faint impressed lines. The colour of the shell is polished ivory-white. The conical spire is high and narrow. The 2½ embryonic whorls of the protoconch are cylindrical, quite smooth, and have the extreme point very much flattened down on one side so as to make a perfectly rounded tip. The shell contains 11½ whorls in all. They are rather short, and of very regular increase, slightly convex, but not contracted either above or below. The body whorl is very slightly tumid with a rounded base, contracting very rapidly to a short broad snout, which is abruptly truncated at the point. The suture is rather oblique, fine, regular, defined by a slight impression: it rises a very little at the aperture. The aperture is pear-shaped, small, narrow and a little contracted in front. The outer lip is somewhat thickened, with a small reverted edge in the sinus and at the point of the siphonal canal, but sharp and a little contracted in all the rest of its extent. It leaves the body at a slightly acute angle, and retreats at once obliquely, but very shortly, to form the narrow rounded sinus, from which, almost parallel to the line of the suture (i.e., with a very slight oblique direction forwards), it sweeps far out in a great convex-edged wing, retreating again a little to the edge of the very short siphonal canal, where it turns slightly and obliquely forwards. The point of the siphonal canal is open, and cut off obliquely from the right forwards to the point of the pillar. The inner lip has a thin porcellanous glaze, a little thickened at the top. It spreads narrowly on the body, which is a good deal excavated. The columella is straight, short, conical, very little truncated, with a slightly twisted and sharpish edge, and a pretty solid though fine point at the extreme front of the shell.

== Distribution ==
This species occurs in the demersal zone of the Caribbean Sea (St. Thomas) and the Atlantic Ocean off Brazil.
