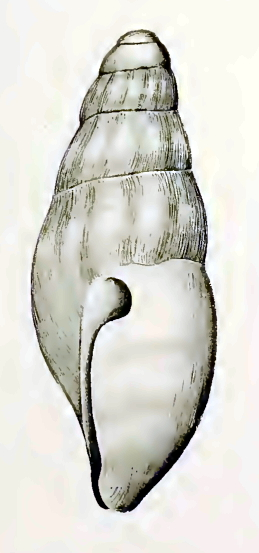
- Original image of a shell of Austrodrillia subplicata

Scientific classification
- Kingdom: Animalia
- Phylum: Mollusca
- Class: Gastropoda
- Subclass: Caenogastropoda
- Order: Neogastropoda
- Superfamily: Conoidea
- Family: Horaiclavidae
- Genus: Austrodrillia
- Species: A. subplicata

Binomial name
- Austrodrillia subplicata (Verco, 1909)

Synonyms
- Drillia subplicata Verco, 1909

= Austrodrillia subplicata =

Species of gastropod

Austrodrillia subplicata is a species of sea snail, a marine gastropod mollusk in the family Horaiclavidae.

It was formerly included within the family Turridae.

== Description ==
The length of the shell attains 7 mm, its diameter is 3 mm.

(Original description) The short, solid shell is narrowly oval, with a blunt apex and a slightly contracted base. The protoconch consists of two smooth, slightly convex whorls. The four whorls of the spire are sloping scarcely convex. The sutures are linear. The aperture is oval, slightly contracted behind, opening widely into a very short siphonal canal in front. The outer lip is simple; with a shallow, round sinus near the suture, a convex profile, and a very faint sinus anteriorly. The inner lip shows a complete, applied narrow glaze. The columella is straight and slightly bent to the left in the siphonal canal. There are faint oblique axial ribs, equal to the interspaces. The shell shows well-marked crowded sinuous incremental striae. There is no spiral sculpture. The colour of the shell is light brown, with a band of lighter colour on the middle of the spire-whorls, whitish where it crosses the ribs. There are three light bands on the body whorl.

== Distribution ==
This marine species is endemic to Australia and occurs off South Australia.
