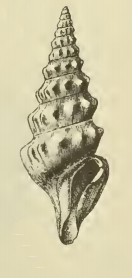
- Original drawing of a shell of Spirotropis centimata

Scientific classification
- Kingdom: Animalia
- Phylum: Mollusca
- Class: Gastropoda
- Subclass: Caenogastropoda
- Order: Neogastropoda
- Superfamily: Conoidea
- Family: Drilliidae
- Genus: Spirotropis
- Species: S. centimata

Binomial name
- Spirotropis centimata (Dall, 1889)

Synonyms
- Cymatosyrinx centimata (Dall, 1889); Clavus (Cymatosyrinx) centimata (Dall, 1889); Drillia (Cymatosyrinx) centimata Dall, 1889 (basionym); Drillia leucopyrga Kobelt, W., 1904 (nomen nudum); Pleurotoma (Cymatosyrinx) centimata (Dall, 1889); Pleurotoma centimata (Dall, 1889); Spirotropis centimatus (Dall, 1889); Spirotropis leucopyrga W. Kobelt, 1904

= Spirotropis centimata =

Species of gastropod

Spirotropis centimata is a species of sea snail, a marine gastropod mollusk in the family Drilliidae.

== Description ==
The size of an adult shell varies between 10 mm and 34 mm.

(Original description) The pure white shell has a pointed turreted spire, a brownish glossy rounded protoconch of 2½ whorls, and nine or ten subsequent whorls. The fasciole is wide, sloping, reaching to the somewhat appressed suture, smooth except for the deeply arched incremental lines. The transverse sculpture, aside from lines of growth, consists of thirteen or fourteen peripheral nodules, well elevated, and on the body whorl somewhat elongated and obliquely set. There is no spiral sculpture even on the siphonal canal. The fasciole is so wide, and the whorls increase so rapidly, that the shell has a peculiarly conical aspect. The base of the shell is moderately rounded. The aperture is moderately wide, with a very wide and deep anal notch, and the outer lip correspondingly curved forward, arched, and thin. The inner lip shows a moderate callus. The columella is simple, slender and much twisted. The siphonal canal is short, rather wide, and flaring a little at the end. There is no varix behind the aperture.

== Distribution ==
This species occurs in the demersal zone of European waters, the Atlantic Ocean off North Carolina and Alabama, off the Bahamas, and off West Africa; in the Gulf of Mexico
