= Austrodrillia hinomotoensis =

Scientific classification
- Kingdom: Animalia
- Phylum: Mollusca
- Class: Gastropoda
- Subclass: Caenogastropoda
- Order: Neogastropoda
- Superfamily: Conoidea
- Family: Horaiclavidae
- Genus: Austrodrillia
- Species: A. hinomotoensis

Binomial name
- Austrodrillia hinomotoensis Kuroda, Habe & Oyama, 1971

Species of gastropod

Austrodrillia hinomotoensis is a species of sea snail, a marine gastropod mollusk in the family Horaiclavidae.

It was formerly included within the family Turridae.

== Distribution ==
This marine species occurs in Sagami Bay, Japan.
