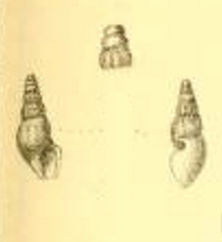
- Original image of a shell of Austrodrillia saxea

Scientific classification
- Kingdom: Animalia
- Phylum: Mollusca
- Class: Gastropoda
- Subclass: Caenogastropoda
- Order: Neogastropoda
- Superfamily: Conoidea
- Family: Horaiclavidae
- Genus: Austrodrillia
- Species: A. saxea

Binomial name
- Austrodrillia saxea (Sowerby III, 1896)

Synonyms
- Drillia saxea Sowerby III, 1896

= Austrodrillia saxea =

Species of gastropod

Austrodrillia saxea is a species of sea snail, a marine gastropod mollusk in the family Horaiclavidae.

It was formerly included within the family Turridae, the turrids.

== Description ==
The length of the shell attains 7 mm, its diameter 3 mm. The color of the shell shows an infrasutural spiral row of brown spots between the axial plicae, spirally elongate. On the body whorl are three faint continuous spiral brown bands, and very faint curved axial bands.

== Distribution ==
This marine species is endemic to Australia and occurs off New South Wales, South Australia, Tasmania and Victoria.
