= Micropleurotoma spirotropoides =

Scientific classification
- Kingdom: Animalia
- Phylum: Mollusca
- Class: Gastropoda
- Subclass: Caenogastropoda
- Order: Neogastropoda
- Superfamily: Conoidea
- Family: Horaiclavidae
- Genus: Micropleurotoma
- Species: M. spirotropoides

Binomial name
- Micropleurotoma spirotropoides (Thiele, 1925)

Synonyms
- Pleurotoma spirotropoides Thiele, 1925

Species of gastropod

Micropleurotoma spirotropoides is a species of sea snail, a marine gastropod mollusk in the family Horaiclavidae a group within the superfamily Conoidea known for their sophisticated venom apparatus used to hunt marine invertebrates. Originally described by the German malacologist Johannes Thiele in 1925 as Drillia spirotropoides, the species is characterized by its fusiform, high-spired shell which typically exhibits a "stepped" appearance due to the angularity of its whorls. The shell sculpture is defined by a series of fine spiral threads and a distinct sinus (notch) on the outer lip of the aperture, a feature common to the "turrid" group of snails that allows for the extension of a respiratory siphon. Inhabiting deep-water benthic environments, particularly across the Indo-Pacific and Southern Oceans, this gastropod is adapted to life on soft substrates like mud or fine sand. Its taxonomic placement has evolved over time, moving from the broader family Turridae to the more refined Horaiclavidae, reflecting modern molecular and morphological research into the diverse lineages of predatory marine mollusks.

== Description ==
The average length of the shell is 5 mm.

== Distribution ==
This marine species occurs in the Alborán Sea, Mediterranean and off Southeast Africa
