= Aoteadrillia apicarinata =

Scientific classification
- Kingdom: Animalia
- Phylum: Mollusca
- Class: Gastropoda
- Subclass: Caenogastropoda
- Order: Neogastropoda
- Superfamily: Conoidea
- Family: Horaiclavidae
- Genus: Aoteadrillia
- Species: A. apicarinata

Binomial name
- Aoteadrillia apicarinata (P. Marshall & R. Murdoch, 1923)

Extinct species of gastropod

Aoteadrillia apicarinata is an extinct species of sea snail, a marine gastropod mollusk in the family Horaiclavidae.

== Distribution ==
This extinct marine species was endemic to New Zealand.
