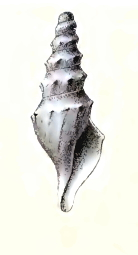
- Original image of a shell of Spirotropis stirophora

Scientific classification
- Kingdom: Animalia
- Phylum: Mollusca
- Class: Gastropoda
- Subclass: Caenogastropoda
- Order: Neogastropoda
- Superfamily: Conoidea
- Family: Drilliidae
- Genus: Spirotropis
- Species: S. stirophora

Binomial name
- Spirotropis stirophora (Watson, 1881)

Synonyms
- Drillia stirophora (Watson, 1881); Pleurotoma stirophora (Watson, 1881); Pleurotoma (Drillia) stirophora Watson, 1881 (basionym); Pleurotoma (Spirotropis) stirophora (Watson, 1881)

= Spirotropis stirophora =

Species of gastropod

Spirotropis stirophora is a species of sea snail, a marine gastropod mollusk in the family Drilliidae.

== Description ==
The shell of this micromollusc grows to a length of 7.6 mm.

(Original description) The high, narrow, angulated shell is obsoletely ribbed. It is tubercled, thin, polished, flinty white, with an elongated conical base, longish columella, and a blunt apex. The lower half of the whorls is crossed by obsolete, rounded, oblique, straight longitudinal ribs, with very slight rounded depressions between.; There are about 12 ribs, of increasing indistinctness, on the body whorl, and 9 on the first regular whorl. They take their origin in a row of small, round, sharpish tubercles. They do not extend to the base. The lines of growth are faint sharpish scratches, and are quite independent of the ribs. A little above the middle, each whorl is angulated and carinated, the carinal thread being set with small, sharpish-pointed tubercles, in which the longitudinal ribs originate. The sinus area is smooth. The rest of the surface is marked by very obsolete, depressed, rounded threads. The colour of the shell is greyish transparent white. The high spire is narrow and conical. Its profile-lines are but little interrupted by the broad, shallow, sutural depression which extends from keel to keel of the successive whorls. The protoconch consists of nearly 2 embryonic whorls, which are cylindrical, quite smooth, and end in a perfectly rounded tip, which is slightly immersed, and scarcely, if at all, oblique. The 7 whorls are short and of slow increase. They are angulated above the middle, with a drooping, scarcely hollowed shoulder above, and a very slight contraction of their straight line below. The last is small, rapidly contracted on the conical base, and running out into a somewhat one-sided, and slightly twisted, narrow, longish snout. The suture is a little oblique, linear and a little disturbed by the longitudinal rib; well defined by the superior and inferior slope of the whorls. The aperture is club-shaped, oval above, with a longish, open, rather oblique siphonal canal. The outer lip is thin, with a flattened, convex curve, which is steepish at the shoulder and elongated at the siphonal canal. On leaving the body it sweeps at once backwards, leaving a very narrow shelf between the body whorl and the sinus. The sinus is rounded, rather shallow and open, but large, from the very considerable forward sweep of the pinion-like edge of the lip as it approaches the siphonal canal, from which it retreats toward the point of the shell. The inner lip is a thinly glazed, narrow, slightly depressed area. It is very slightly hollowed at the base of the longish finely conical columella. The point of the columella is cut off with a long-drawn obliquity, and has a fine, slightly twisted edge.

== Distribution ==
This species occurs in the demersal zone of the Atlantic Ocean from Florida to Brazil at depths between 85 mm and 640 m.
