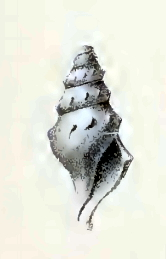
- Original image of a shell of Spirotropis phaeacra

Scientific classification
- Kingdom: Animalia
- Phylum: Mollusca
- Class: Gastropoda
- Subclass: Caenogastropoda
- Order: Neogastropoda
- Superfamily: Conoidea
- Family: Drilliidae
- Genus: Spirotropis
- Species: S. phaeacra

Binomial name
- Spirotropis phaeacra (Watson, 1881)

Synonyms
- Drillia phaeacra (Watson, 1881); Pleurotoma phaeacra (Watson, 1881); Pleurotoma (Bela) phaeacra (Watson, 1881); Pleurotoma (Drillia) phaeacra Watson, 1881 (basionym)

= Spirotropis phaeacra =

Species of gastropod

Spirotropis phaeacra is a species of sea snail, a marine gastropod mollusk in the family Drilliidae.

== Description ==
The shell of this micromollusc grows to a length of 4.6 mm.

(Original description) The conical, angulated, tubercled shell is thin, polished, glassy, with a blunt, dun apex, a contracted base, and a longish columella. There is no longitudinal sculpture other than the fine scratch-like lines of growth. Toward the bottom of each whorl is a row of about twelve round, blunt-tipped, rather prominent tubercles, which form an angulated keel where otherwise there is no carination. There is also a slight blunt keel round the base. Its surface is covered with very obsolete, rounded, flat threads. The colour of the shell is polished glassy white, with a hyaline dun apex. The spire is high, rather narrow, and conical. Its profile-lines are little interrupted by the carinal tubercles. The protoconch consists of about two glossy, dun-coloured, globose, embryonic whorls. The extreme tip is rounded and slightly bent down on one side. The shell contains 6 short whorls of slow growth, with a longish, drooping, somewhat concave shoulder, angulated below the middle by the row of tubercles, and slightly contracted into the inferior suture. The base, which is a good deal contracted, is conical, and runs out into a fine longish snout. The aperture is club-shaped, being somewhat pointedly rhomboidal above, with a longish siphonal canal below. The outer lip is thin, with a pretty regular convex curve, which is flattened at the summit, and prolonged in a straightish line at the siphonal canal. On leaving the body it retreats at once, leaving a very small shelf above the sinus, which is shaped like an open U with diverging margins: toward the lower part of the aperture the lip runs out in a pinion-shaped projection, retreating thence to the point of the columella. The inner lip is thin and narrow, a little concave, with a loug sharp-edged truncation of the point of the columella.

== Distribution ==
This species occurs in the Atlantic Ocean off Northeast Brazil at a depth of 630 m.
