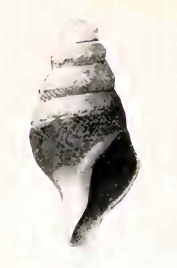
- Original image of a shell of Spirotropis agamedea

Scientific classification
- Kingdom: Animalia
- Phylum: Mollusca
- Class: Gastropoda
- Subclass: Caenogastropoda
- Order: Neogastropoda
- Superfamily: Conoidea
- Family: Drilliidae
- Genus: Spirotropis
- Species: S. agamedea

Binomial name
- Spirotropis agamedea (Dall, 1919)

Synonyms
- Antiplanes agamedea Dall, 1919

= Spirotropis agamedea =

Species of gastropod

Spirotropis agamedea is a species of sea snail, a marine gastropod mollusk in the family Drilliidae.

Grant & Gale (1931) put this species in the genus Spirotropis

== Description ==
The length of the shell attains 10.5 mm, its diameter 5 mm.

(Original description) The small, white shell is covered with an olivaceous periostracum. It contains more than five whorls. The apex is eroded. The periphery shows a rounded keel. The spiral sculpture consists of a thickened flattish ridge in front of the channeled suture, and obscure spiral threading on the impressed anal fasciole and base. The siphonal canal is smooth. The axial sculpture consists of fine incremental lines more or less reticulating the spirals and arcuate over the fasciole. The peripheral keel on the spire is nearer the succeeding than the preceding suture. The aperture is elongate. The outer lip is thin and smooth within and arcuately produced in front of the fasciole. The inner lip is erased. The straight columella is short, solid and obliquely attenuated in front.

== Distribution ==
This marine species occurs in the Pacific Ocean off Cape San Quentin, Lower California at a depth of 650 m.
