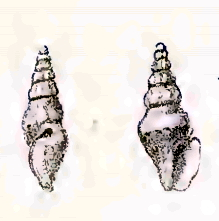
- Original image of a shell of Austrodrillia dimidiata

Scientific classification
- Kingdom: Animalia
- Phylum: Mollusca
- Class: Gastropoda
- Subclass: Caenogastropoda
- Order: Neogastropoda
- Superfamily: Conoidea
- Family: Horaiclavidae
- Genus: Austrodrillia
- Species: A. dimidiata

Binomial name
- Austrodrillia dimidiata (Sowerby III, 1896)

Synonyms
- Austrodrillia achatina Verco, J.C., 1909; Drillia achatina Verco, 1909; Drillia dimidiata Sowerby III, 1896

= Austrodrillia dimidiata =

Species of gastropod

Austrodrillia dimidiata is a species of sea snail, a marine gastropod mollusk in the family Horaiclavidae.

It was formerly included within the family Turridae.

== Description ==
The length of the shell attains 7.9 mm, its diameter 2 mm.

(Description by Joseph Verco) The solid, elongate-fusiform shell consists of 6 1/2 whorls, including the blunt protoconch, which merges into the spire insensibly. The first whorl and a half are smooth and rather flat; the next is scarcely convex, and has at first distant invalid axial angulations, which gradually become more numerous and costulate. In the next whorl they become more distant again, and remain throughout the shell as feeble axial angulations which are just visible when looking at the shell from the apex. The spire-whorls are subconvex, subangulate just below the middle, and have the upper fourth somewhat adpressed just below the simple impressed suture. The aperture is oblique oblong-ovate. The siphonal canal is short, wide, scarcely notched. The outer lip is solid but sharp, with a deep round sinus separated from the ascending suture by a callus from the posterior part of the inner lip, then straightly convexly antecurrent to two shallower sinuses at the base of the siphonal canal. The inner lip shows a complete smooth thin applied glaze, thickened behind. The spiral incisions, which begin in the second half of the first sculptured protoconchal whorl, cut the surface up into flat slightly rounded ribs, increasing to eleven in the penultimate and twenty-four in the body whorl, the second below the suture and that at the angulation being the widest. Microscopic incremental striae scratch the whole surface and have the sinuosities of the outer lip. A narrow white spiral, articulated with brown, ornaments the angulation, with a fainter narrower one above, and a rather wider brown spiral articulated with white runs from the back of the aperture over the dorsum nearly to the lip margin. The general colour is brown, with darker irregular spots and clouds.

== Distribution ==
This marine species is endemic to Australia and occurs off South Australia.
