= Pleurotoma mediocris =

Scientific classification
- Kingdom: Animalia
- Phylum: Mollusca
- Class: Gastropoda
- (unranked): clade Caenogastropoda clade Hypsogastropoda clade Neogastropoda
- Superfamily: Conoidea
- Family: Turridae
- Genus: Turris; Alternative genus name (synonym): Pleurotoma (Lamarck, 1799)
- Species: P. mediocris

Binomial name
- Pleurotoma mediocris Deshayes, 1863

Synonyms
- Tylotiella mediocris (Deshayes, 1863)

Species of gastropod

Pleurotoma mediocris is a species of sea snail, a marine gastropod mollusk in the family Turridae.

According to the World Register of Marine Species, this is a nomen dubium.

== Distribution ==
This marine species occurs off Réunion and New Caledonia.
