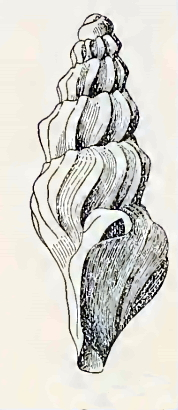
- Original image of a shell of Splendrillia nenia

Scientific classification
- Kingdom: Animalia
- Phylum: Mollusca
- Class: Gastropoda
- Subclass: Caenogastropoda
- Order: Neogastropoda
- Superfamily: Conoidea
- Family: Drilliidae
- Genus: Splendrillia
- Species: S. nenia

Binomial name
- Splendrillia nenia (Hedley, 1903)

Synonyms
- Austrodrillia nenia (Hedley, 1903); Drillia nenia Hedley, 1903

= Splendrillia nenia =

Species of gastropod

Splendrillia nenia is a species of sea snail, a marine gastropod mollusk in the family Drilliidae.

== Description ==
The length of the shell attains 6.6 mm, its diameter 2.5 mm.

(Original description) The small, narrow, glossy shell is angled at the shoulder. It contains 5 whorls plus a smooth, tilted, globose, two-whorled protoconch. Its colour is pure white. Its sculpture shows curved, stout shouldered ribs, twelve on the body whorl. These mount the spire obliquely, become obsolete anteriorly, and terminate abruptly at each anal fasciole. The whole shell is covered by fine, close, microscopic growth striae. The base of the shell is contracted. The siphonal canal is short. The aperture is narrow. The anal notch is deep, with a raised, subtubular margin. The columella is slightly arched, overlaid by a thick callus sheet.

== Distribution ==
This marine species is endemic to Australia and occurs off New South Wales, Queensland, South Australia, Victoria and Western Australia
