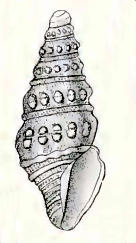
- Image of a shell of Aoteadrillia wanganuiensis

Scientific classification
- Kingdom: Animalia
- Phylum: Mollusca
- Class: Gastropoda
- Subclass: Caenogastropoda
- Order: Neogastropoda
- Superfamily: Conoidea
- Family: Horaiclavidae
- Genus: Aoteadrillia
- Species: A. wanganuiensis

Binomial name
- Aoteadrillia wanganuiensis (Hutton, 1873)

Synonyms
- † Aoteadrillia alpha (L. C. King, 1933) junior subjective synonym; †† Aoteadrillia bisecta A. W. B. Powell, 1942 (junior subjective synonym); Aoteadrillia chordata (Suter, 1908); Aoteadrillia thomsoni Powell, 1942; Aoteadrillia trifida Powell, 1942; † Austrodrillia alpha L. C. King, 1933 (junior subjective synonym); † Austrodrillia beta L. C. King, 1933 (junior subjective synonym); † Austrodrillia gamma L. C. King, 1933 (junior subjective synonym); Drillia chordata Suter, 1908; Pleurotoma wanganuiensis Hutton, 1873 (original description)

= Aoteadrillia wanganuiensis =

Species of gastropod

Aoteadrillia wanganuiensis is a species of sea snail, a marine gastropod mollusk in the family Horaiclavidae.

It was formerly included within the family Turridae.

== Description ==
The length of the shell attains 9 mm, its diameter 3.9 mm.

(Original description) The shell has a fusiform shape. The spire is produced, longer than the body whorl. The whorls are rounded, strongly spirally striated, and obliquely ribbed in the centre. The suture is very finely obliquely striated and with a spiral rib. The aperture is oval. The siphonal canal is short.(described as Pleurotoma wanganuiensis)

(Description by Henry Suter) The small, fairly solid, whitish shell has a fusiform shape. The suture strongly margined. The whorls are angulated by a row of large nodules. The spire is high. The anal sinus is moderately deep. The sculpture consists of a row of large oval nodules on the middle of the whorls, about 14 on a whorl. Those on the last two whorls are somewhat stretched out towards the suture below and incised in the middle by a spiral linear groove. A very strong spiral cord margins the suture below, and a fine thread above. The latter is continued as a rather strong cord on the body whorl, and is succeeded below by a similar cord. The base of the body whorl is adorned with fine spiral threads, close together upon the beak. The whole sculpture is crossed by very fine, strongly flexuous, and oblique growth lines. The spire is high, conic, somewhat less than twice the height of the aperture. The protoconch consists of 2 whorls, which are microscopically spirally striate. The nucleus is oblique, rounded, the second volution shows a sharp median keel. The shell contains 7 whorls, regularly increasing, roundly angled at the middle by the nodules, concave above and below it. The body whorl is slightly convex, contracted at the base. The suture is linear and bimarginate. The aperture is oblique, oval, angled above, produced below into an oblique short and open siphonal canal, slightly notched at its base. The outer lip is sharp, somewhat strengthened on the outside, moderately convex, contracted below, with a fairly deep and rounded sinus in the depression above the row of nodules. The columella is slightly arcuate, excavated on meeting the parietal wall. The inner lip is thin and narrow, drawn out to a point towards the margin of the siphonal canal. The operculum is unknown.

== Distribution ==
This marine species is endemic to New Zealand and occurs off Ninety Mile Beach, North Island.

Fossils have been found in Pliocene strata in New Zealand.

== Gallery ==
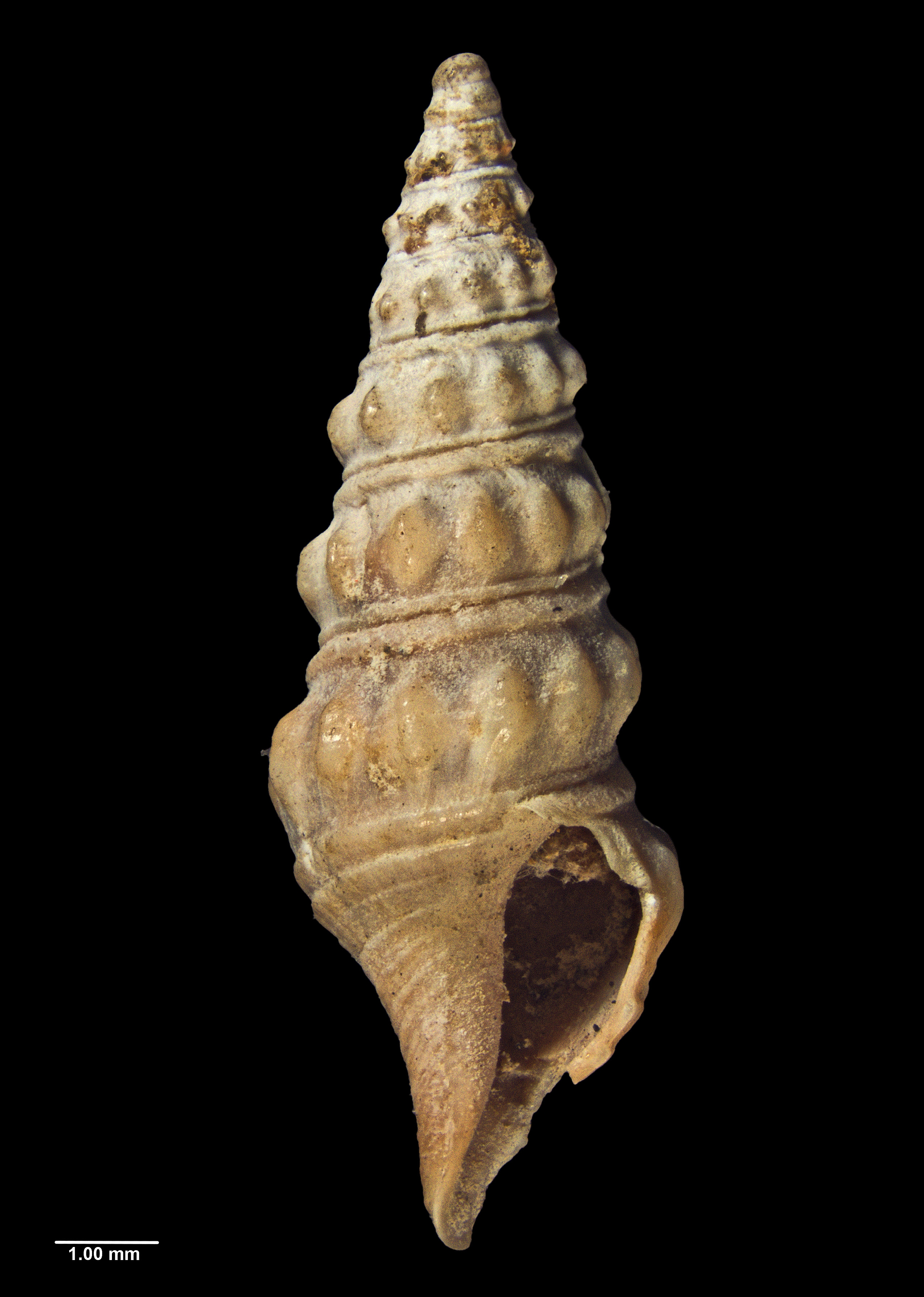
Type specimen (holotype of Aoteadrillia bisecta)

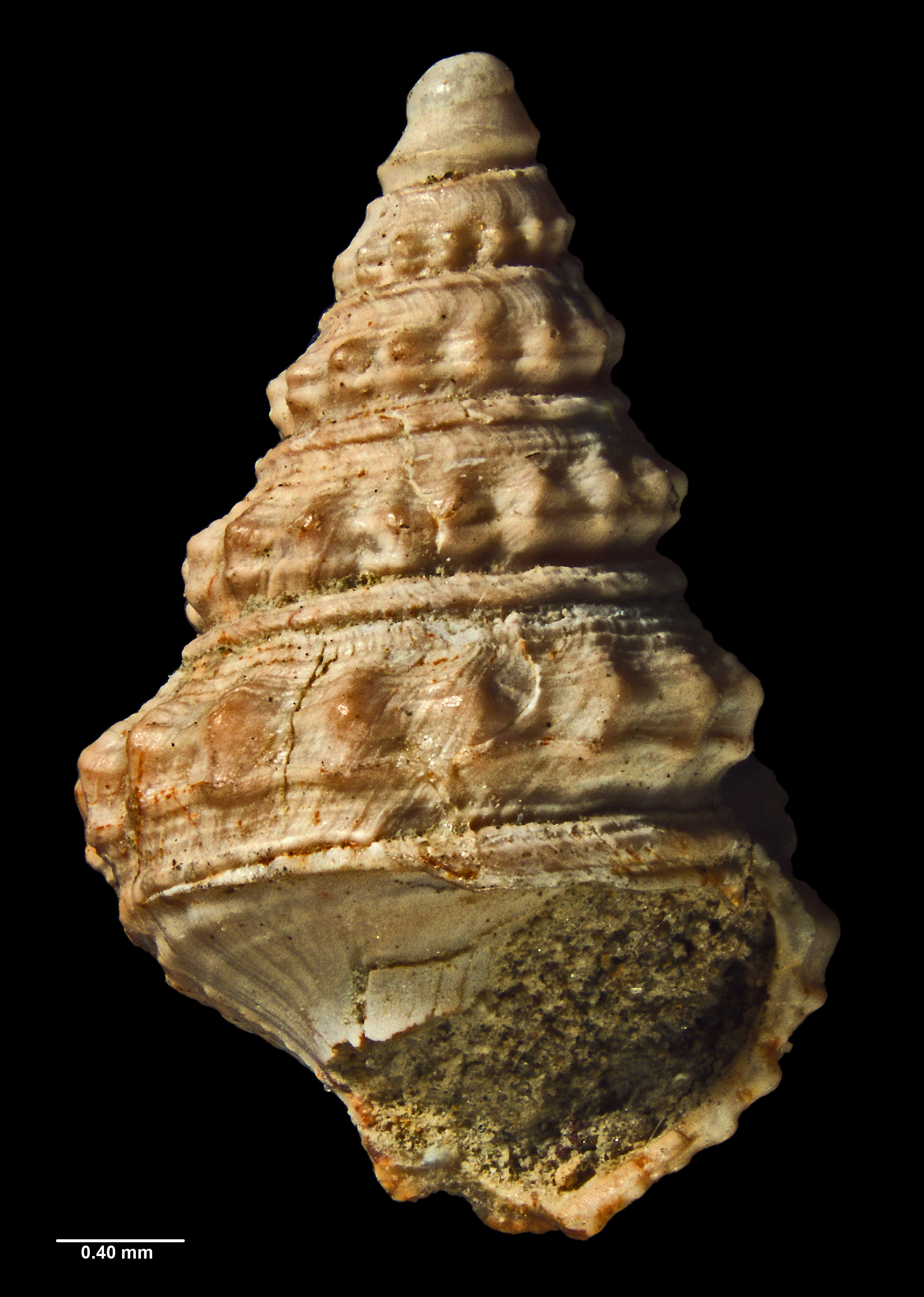
Type specimen (holotype of Aoteadrillia thomsoni)
