= Austrodrillia rawitensis =

Scientific classification
- Kingdom: Animalia
- Phylum: Mollusca
- Class: Gastropoda
- Subclass: Caenogastropoda
- Order: Neogastropoda
- Superfamily: Conoidea
- Family: Horaiclavidae
- Genus: Austrodrillia
- Species: A. rawitensis

Binomial name
- Austrodrillia rawitensis Hedley, 1922

Synonyms
- Aoteadrillia rawitensis (Hedley, 1922)

Species of gastropod

Austrodrillia rawitensis is a species of sea snail, a marine gastropod mollusk in the family Horaiclavidae.

It was previously categorized within the family Turridae.

== Description ==
The length of the shell attains 15 mm, its diameter 6 mm.

== Distribution ==
This marine species is endemic to New Zealand.
