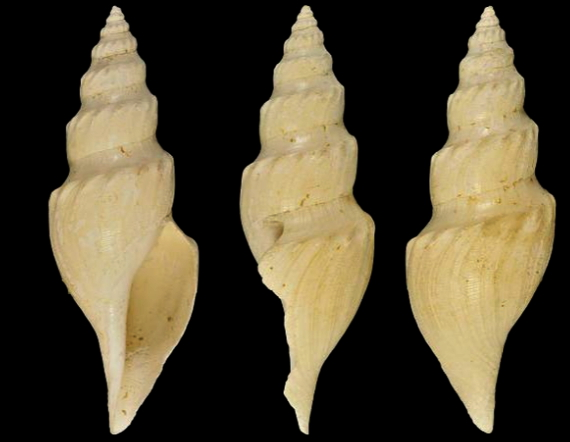
- Shell of Theta chariessa (holotype at the Smithsonian Institution)

Scientific classification
- Kingdom: Animalia
- Phylum: Mollusca
- Class: Gastropoda
- Subclass: Caenogastropoda
- Order: Neogastropoda
- Family: Raphitomidae
- Genus: Theta
- Species: T. chariessa

Binomial name
- Theta chariessa (Watson, 1881)

Synonyms
- Gymnobela chariessa (Watson, 1881); Mangilia (Pleurotomella) catasarca Dall, 1889; Mangilia (Pleurotomella) chariessa (Watson, 1881); Mangilia (Pleurotomella) chariessa var. tellea (Dall, 1889); Pleurotoma (Defrancia) chariessa Watson, 1881 (original combination); Pleurotoma gisota Dautzenberg & Fischer H., 1896; Pleurotoma turrisulcatum Locard, 1897; Pleurotoma urinator Locard, 1897; Pleurotomella catasarca Dall, 1889; Pleurotomella chariessa (Watson, 1881); Pleurotomella chariessa var. tellea Dall, 1889; Pleurotomella pistillata Dall, 1890; Pleurotomella jeffreysi Verrill, 1885; Pleurotomella stearina Dall, 1889; Pleurotomella urinator Locard, 1897; Speoides jeffreysii Verrill, 1885; Spirotropis turrisulcata É.A.A. Locard, 1897

= Theta chariessa =

Species of gastropod

Theta chariessa is a species of sea snail, a marine gastropod mollusk in the family Raphitomidae.

In 1980 Bouchet & Warén brought this species into the genus Theta.

Subspecies

- Theta chariessa aresta (Dall, 1889)
- Theta chariessa phalera (Dall, 1889)

== Description ==
The length of the shell varies between 20 mm and 58 mm.

(Original description) The high, biconical shell is a little tumid and carinated. It is white and thin,. The shell is faintly, shortly, and obliquely ribbed, with a high, subscalar, small-pointed spire, and a slightly tumid little-contracted base, produced into a long narrow siphonal canal.

Sculpture. Longitudinals: there are on the body whorl about 20 short oblique folds, which die out almost immediately. They are highest at their origin below the sinus area, and are parted by flat intervals somewhat broader than they. They diminish in number up the spire, and do not reach the lower suture. There are further obsolete lines of growth, which in the sinus area are strong, and at the suture form sharp little folds parted by wide unequal intervals. Spirals: the sutural area is wide, but scarcely concave. It is bordered by the blunt angulation forming the keel, which is greatly strengthened by the prominence of the origin of the longitudinal ribs. From the keel downwards the shell is covered by superficial, flattened, irregular, and unequal threads parted by narrower shallow furrows. These become slightly stronger and more regular on the siphonal canal.

The colour of the shell is ivory white. The protoconch is ruddy brown.

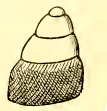
Reticulations on the protoconch of Theta chariessa

The spire is conical, high, rather narrow, subscalar, sometimes scalar from the squareness with which the sinus area stands out in the upper whorls. The lines of profile are very much interrupted by the prominence of the keel. The protoconch is small, ruddy brown, consisting of 4 1/2 conical whorls. Of these the lower two-thirds is covered with very minute reticulations, while the upper part is scored with minute curved bars, the surface between which is very slightly spirally marked. It ends in a minute tip a little bent down on one side. The shell contains 10 whorls in all, of regular proportions and uniform increase. They are conical above and cylindrical below the keel. The body whorl is slightly tumid, and contracts very gradually to a long and small siphonal canal. The suture is extremely minute as each whorl laps up on the one above it. The aperture is oblong, pointed above, and drawn out into a long narrow siphonal canal below. The outer lip is pretty regularly arched from the body to the siphonal canal, from which point it is drawn out rather straight. Its edge advances in the middle very prominently. Above this it forms a high shoulder, between which and the body whorl lies the deep, rounded, and very wide-mouthed sinus. Towards the front of the aperture the edge runs straight, then retreats, so as to form a broad, slight, small sinus at the top of the siphonal canal, and then runs straight. The inner lip shows a thin glaze excavated slightly in the substance of the shell. The columella is long, narrow, and fine-pointed, with a slight swelling coiling round its base where its junction with the body is but slightly concave.

== Distribution ==
Theta chariessa can be found in Atlantic waters, ranging from the coast of Massachusetts south to Brazil.; also off the Azores and the Canary Islands.
