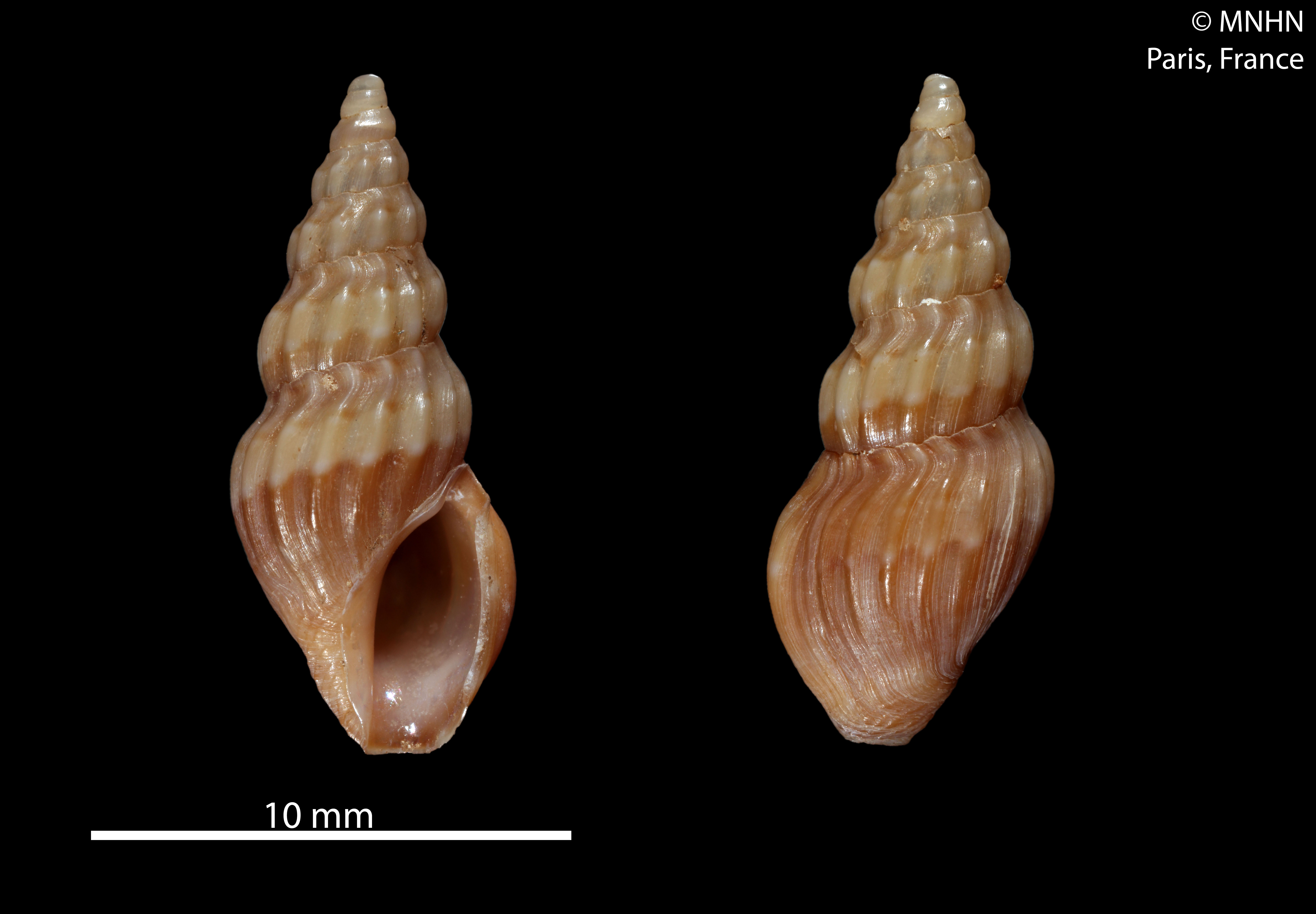
- Shell of Clavus isibopho (paratype at MNHN, Paris)

Scientific classification
- Kingdom: Animalia
- Phylum: Mollusca
- Class: Gastropoda
- Subclass: Caenogastropoda
- Order: Neogastropoda
- Superfamily: Conoidea
- Family: Drilliidae
- Genus: Clavus
- Species: C. isibopho

Binomial name
- Clavus isibopho Kilburn, 1988

Synonyms
- Tylotiella isibopho Kilburn, 1988 (original combination)

= Clavus isibopho =

Species of gastropod

Clavus isibopho is a species of sea snail, a marine gastropod mollusk in the family Drilliidae.

== Description ==
The length of the shell attains 16.4 millimetres (0.65 in), its diameter 6.1 millimetres (0.24 in). The claviform shell is relatively broad with six strongly convex whorls in the teleoconch and a pale peripheral band. The whorls are not shouldered. The axial ribs weaken below the suture and do not undulate on the base. The brown base of the body whorl lacks a row of pustules. The terminal varix is strong. The subsutural region is not contrastingly dark. The spiral threads are microscopic or absent, except 6–7 on the rostrum. The aperture is oblong-ovate. The outer lip is thin and slightly sinuous. The siphonal canal is wide and short and not dorsally notched. The anal sinus is U-shaped.
