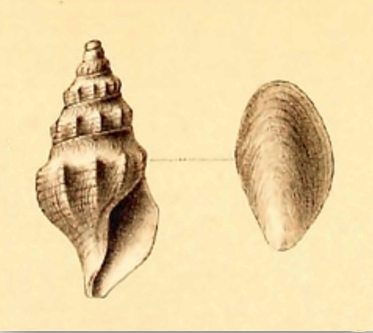
- Original image of a shell of Aoteadrillia bulbacea

Scientific classification
- Kingdom: Animalia
- Phylum: Mollusca
- Class: Gastropoda
- Subclass: Caenogastropoda
- Order: Neogastropoda
- Superfamily: Conoidea
- Family: Horaiclavidae
- Genus: Aoteadrillia
- Species: A. bulbacea

Binomial name
- Aoteadrillia bulbacea (Watson, 1881)

Synonyms
- Drillia bulbacea (Watson, 1881); Fusus dominovae Valenciennes, A., 1858; Pleurotoma (Drillia) bulbacea Watson, 1881 (basionym); Pleurotoma (Spirotropis) bulbacea (Watson, 1881); Spirotropis bulbacea (Watson, 1881)

= Aoteadrillia bulbacea =

Species of gastropod

Aoteadrillia bulbacea is a species of sea snail, a marine gastropod mollusk in the family Horaiclavidae.

It was previously included within the family Turridae.

== Description ==
(Original description) The shell is broadish, conical and sharply keeled. It has a shortish contracted base and a short snout, short narrow ribs, and spiral threads, a bulbous apex, strong, porcellaneous. Below the sinus area and about one third down the whorl from the suture arise, not quite abruptly, longitudinal ribs slightly tubercled at the top, straight, direct, narrow, and parted by shallow furrows about twice their breadth. They become feeble toward the lower suture. On the body whorl they do not continue to the base, and become broader and weaker toward the aperture. There are eleven on the last and penultimate whorls. On the first infra-embryonic whorl there are about seventeen, crowded, sharp, scarcely curved and oblique. The lines of growth are numerous and unequal. In the sinus-area they are sharp and delicate, on the rest of the shell coarse and puckered. Marginating the suture at the top of each whorl is a narrow scarcely swollen spiral band. Below this the sinus area is very finely, almost microscopically, scratched; and this scratch-sculpture is continued, though less distinctly, on the rest of the surface. The projection of the top of the ribs forms a sharp keel. The rib area is crossed by five coarsish threads, which rise into small tubercles on the ribs. One or two smaller threads come in between the lines of these spirals. The same sort of threads, but less distinct, are found on the base. Those on the columella and snout are a little more distinct. The colour is dull porcellaneous white. The epidermis is quite gone. The spire is rather short, conical, very slightly scalar, cylindrical toward the top. The apex consists of two smooth embryonic whorls, swollen and roundedly pressed down, with a deepish suture, rather more prominent than the regular whorl which follows. The shell contains 6 1/2 short whorls, of rather rapid increase. The body whorl is large relatively to the rest. From the suture to the ribbing they are concavely shouldered. The projection of the tubercles at the top of the ribs forms a carination. which does not really exist in the form of the whorls themselves. There is a very slight contraction towards the lower suture. The body whorl contracts slightly from the keel to the edge of the base, and from that point rapidly to the small, narrow, straight, and direct snout. The suture is coarse, slightly impressed, and well defined by the band below it. The aperture is narrowly oval, pointed above, with an oblique, short, rather open and gradually contracted siphonal canal in front. The outer lip is a rather depressed convex curve, a little concave at the top and flattened toward the point: on leaving the body it retreats at once, forming a shallow, blunt V-shaped sinus, from the lower side of which, with little of angulation, it advances very straight to the edge of the siphonal canal, whence it slowly curves backward round the open point of the snout. The inner lip spreads as a very narrow porcellaneous glaze. It runs very obliquely to the base of the shortish narrow columella, below which point it is a very little hollowed. The point of the columella is cut off with a very slight obliquity, and has a blunt and very slightly twisted edge. The operculum is small, oval, smooth, with hair-like striae. The apex is terminal The colour is pale brownish yellow.

== Distribution ==
This marine species is endemic to North Island, New Zealand.
