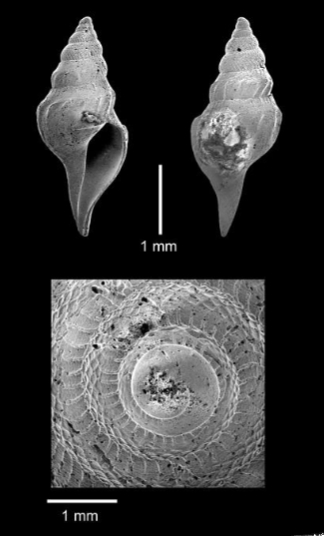
- Shell and protoconch of Gymnobela lanceata (holotype at the Smithsonian institution)

Scientific classification
- Kingdom: Animalia
- Phylum: Mollusca
- Class: Gastropoda
- Subclass: Caenogastropoda
- Order: Neogastropoda
- Superfamily: Conoidea
- Family: Raphitomidae
- Genus: Gymnobela
- Species: G. lanceata

Binomial name
- Gymnobela lanceata W. H. Dall, 1927

Synonyms
- Gymnobela (Theta) lanceata Dall, 1927; Theta lanceata (Dall, 1927)

= Gymnobela lanceata =

Species of gastropod

Gymnobela lanceata is a species of sea snail, a marine gastropod mollusk in the family Raphitomidae.

== Description ==
The length of the shell attains 3 mm, its diameter 1.5 mm.

(Original description) The minute, white, acute shell has a sinusigera protoconch consisting of 4 whorls followed by two subsequent whorls. The suture is appressed, bordered in front by close, short, axial wrinkles. The anal fasciole is slightly concave, wide, extending to the angle at the shoulder. The axial sculpture consists of about 15 low, short oblique ribs most prominent at the shoulder, with wider interspaces and obsolete in front of the periphery. The spiral sculpture consists of faint spiral striations visible only under the lens. The aperture is subovate. The siphonal canal is long, narrow and straight. The columella is straight and attenuated in front.

== Distribution ==
This species occurs in the Atlantic Ocean off Georgia - Florida, USA
