= Aoteadrillia consequens =

Scientific classification
- Kingdom: Animalia
- Phylum: Mollusca
- Class: Gastropoda
- Subclass: Caenogastropoda
- Order: Neogastropoda
- Superfamily: Conoidea
- Family: Horaiclavidae
- Genus: Aoteadrillia
- Species: A. consequens

Binomial name
- Aoteadrillia consequens (Laws, 1936)

Synonyms
- Austrodrillia consequens C.R. Laws, 1936

Extinct species of gastropod

Aoteadrillia consequens is an extinct species of sea snail, a marine gastropod mollusk in the family Horaiclavidae.

== Description ==
The length of the shell attains 8 mm (estimated), its diameter is 3 mm.

Fossil range is Phanerozoic > Cenozoic > Neogene > Pliocene.

Their functional type is Benthos.

Their feeding type was predatory.

== Distribution ==
This extinct marine species was endemic to New Zealand and was found in the fossiliferous beds at Kaawa Creek.
