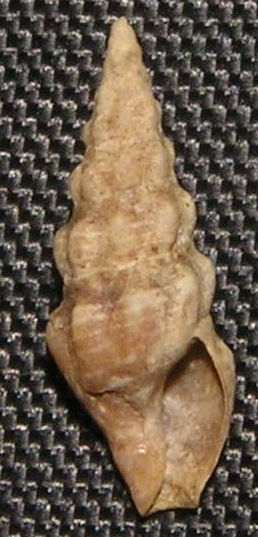
- Apertural view of a shell of Austrodrillia angasi

Scientific classification
- Kingdom: Animalia
- Phylum: Mollusca
- Class: Gastropoda
- Subclass: Caenogastropoda
- Order: Neogastropoda
- Superfamily: Conoidea
- Family: Horaiclavidae
- Genus: Austrodrillia
- Species: A. angasi

Binomial name
- Austrodrillia angasi (Crosse, 1863)

Synonyms
- Drillia angasi (Crosse, 1863); Pleurotoma angasi Crosse, 1863

= Austrodrillia angasi =

Species of gastropod

Austrodrillia angasi, common name Angas's turrid, is a species of sea snail, a marine gastropod mollusk in the family Horaiclavidae.

It was previously classified within the family Turridae.

== Description ==
The length of the shell attains 16 mm.

The shell has a brownish olivaceous color. It contains 9 whorls. The embryonal whorls are smooth. The others contain from seven to ten short longitudinal ribs forming a tuberculated shoulder. The surface often shows minute revolving striae. The aperture is chestnut-brown. Sometimes there is a brown band below the middle of the body whorl.

== Distribution ==
This marine species is endemic to Australia and occurs off New South Wales, Tasmania and Victoria.
