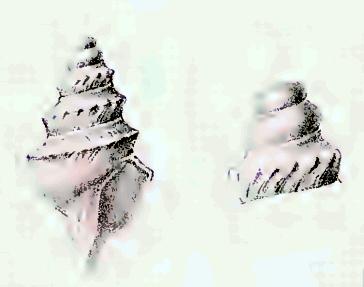
- Original image of the shell and protoconch of Micropleurotoma melvilli

Scientific classification
- Kingdom: Animalia
- Phylum: Mollusca
- Class: Gastropoda
- Subclass: Caenogastropoda
- Order: Neogastropoda
- Superfamily: Conoidea
- Family: Horaiclavidae
- Genus: Micropleurotoma
- Species: M. melvilli

Binomial name
- Micropleurotoma melvilli Sykes, 1906)

Synonyms
- Pleurotoma nana Thiele, 1925; Spirotropis melvilli Sykes, 1906

= Micropleurotoma melvilli =

Species of gastropod

Micropleurotoma melvilli is a species of sea snail, a marine gastropod mollusk in the family Horaiclavidae.

== Description ==
The length of the shell attains 6 mm, its diameter 2.6 mm.

(Original description) The spire of the small, elongate, shell is well raised, varying a good deal in the relative proportions of length and breadth. The colour is hyaline white. It contains 6 whorls, turreted, carinated, regularly but slowly increasing. The suture is well marked, with a small strap-like rim below it. The protoconch is large, white, smooth and elevated. The remaining whorls are marked by a strong spiral keel, which is either smooth or bears acute nodules lines of growth well marked. The aperture is fairly broad. The columella is twisted at the base.

== Distribution ==
This species occurs in the demersal zone of the Atlantic Ocean off Portugal at depths between 1340 m and 2000 m.
