= Drilliola megalacme =

Scientific classification
- Kingdom: Animalia
- Phylum: Mollusca
- Class: Gastropoda
- Subclass: Caenogastropoda
- Order: Neogastropoda
- Superfamily: Conoidea
- Family: Borsoniidae
- Genus: Drilliola
- Species: D. megalacme

Binomial name
- Drilliola megalacme (Sykes, 1906)

Synonyms
- Micropleurotoma megalacme (Sykes, 1906); Spirotropis megalacme Sykes, 1906 (basionym)

Species of gastropod

Drilliola megalacme is a species of sea snail, a marine gastropod mollusk in the family Borsoniidae.

== Description ==
The species has a small, conical shell with its spire well raised and is fairly solid. Its colour is whitish-brown, with a white protoconch. It has six turreted whorls that are regularly increasing. Below the carina appear numerous longitudinal riblets, decussated by spiral carinations, giving the shell a somewhat prickly or nodulous appearance. The mouth is small, with a well-marked sinuation above.

== Distribution ==
This species occurs in European waters along Portugal.
