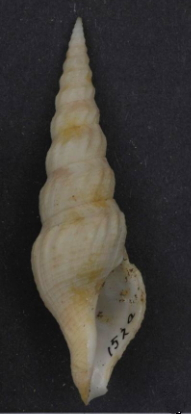
- Shell of Naudedrillia praetermissa (specimen at Naturalis Biodiversity Center)

Scientific classification
- Kingdom: Animalia
- Phylum: Mollusca
- Class: Gastropoda
- Subclass: Caenogastropoda
- Order: Neogastropoda
- Superfamily: Conoidea
- Family: Pseudomelatomidae
- Genus: Naudedrillia
- Species: N. praetermissa

Binomial name
- Naudedrillia praetermissa (E.A. Smith, 1904)

Synonyms
- Austrodrillia praetermissa (E. A. Smith, 1904); Drillia praetermissa E.A. Smith, 1904 (original combination); Drillia zenobia Turton, W.H., 1932

= Naudedrillia praetermissa =

Species of gastropod

Naudedrillia praetermissa is a species of sea snail, a marine gastropod mollusk in the family Pseudomelatomidae, the turrids and allies.

== Description ==
The length of the shell varies between 15 mm and 20 mm.

The species belongs to the Pseudomelatomidae family, which forms part of a larger group known as turrids. This group has witnessed a decline in importance from the Cretaceous period to the present.

== Distribution ==
This marine species occurs off Mossel Bay, KwaZulu-Natal; South Africa.
