= Micropleurotoma remota =

Scientific classification
- Kingdom: Animalia
- Phylum: Mollusca
- Class: Gastropoda
- Subclass: Caenogastropoda
- Order: Neogastropoda
- Superfamily: Conoidea
- Family: Horaiclavidae
- Genus: Micropleurotoma
- Species: M. remota

Binomial name
- Micropleurotoma remota (Powell, 1958)

Synonyms
- Spirotropis remota Powell, 1958 (original combination)

Species of gastropod

Micropleurotoma remota is a species of sea snail, a marine gastropod mollusk in the family Horaiclavidae.

== Distribution ==
This species occurs in the demersal zone of the Antarctic Ocean off Enderby Land, Antarctica. They live at a depth range of 193 – 3816 metres.
