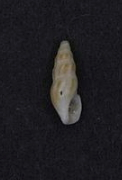
- Apertural view of a shell of Clavus hottentotus (museum specimen at Naturalis Biodiversity Center)

Scientific classification
- Kingdom: Animalia
- Phylum: Mollusca
- Class: Gastropoda
- Subclass: Caenogastropoda
- Order: Neogastropoda
- Superfamily: Conoidea
- Family: Drilliidae
- Genus: Clavus
- Species: C. hottentotus

Binomial name
- Clavus hottentotus (E.A. Smith, 1882)

Synonyms
- Austrodrillia hottentota (E. A. Smith, 1882); Clavatula hottentota (E. A. Smith, 1882); Crassispira hottentota (E. A. Smith, 1882); Drillia hottentota (E. A. Smith, 1882); Pleurotoma (Clavus) hottentota E. A. Smith, 1882; Pleurotoma hottentota E.A. Smith, 1882; Tylotiella hottentota (E. A. Smith, 1882)

= Clavus hottentotus =

Species of gastropod

Clavus hottentotus is a species of sea snail, a marine gastropod mollusk in the family Drilliidae.

== Description ==
The length of the narrowly claviform shell varies between 12 mm and 15 mm. The color of the shell is brown to brownish-orange. The upper interrupted white band is situated around the top of the ribs. Just above each rib there is a faint brown spot. The exterior of the outer lip is whitish. The protoconch is blunt. The 6 teleoconch whorls are not shouldered. They are slightly impressed on top and slightly convex below. The opisthocline axial ribs do not undulate on base. The spiral threads are microscopic or absent, except 6 to 7 on the rostrum. The terminal varix is weak. The subsutural region is dark. The aperture is oblong-ovate. The anal sinus is large and U-shaped. The siphonal canal is short and moderately wide and is not dorsally notched. The callus on the columellar lip is thick. The outer lip is thin and slightly curved.

== Distribution ==
This marine species occurs off Cape Agulhas and West Transkei, South Africa; also off Southern Madagascar.
