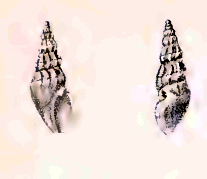
- Original image of a shell of Clavus burnupi

Scientific classification
- Kingdom: Animalia
- Phylum: Mollusca
- Class: Gastropoda
- Subclass: Caenogastropoda
- Order: Neogastropoda
- Superfamily: Conoidea
- Family: Drilliidae
- Genus: Clavus
- Species: C. burnupi

Binomial name
- Clavus burnupi (G. B. Sowerby III, 1897)

Synonyms
- Austrodrillia burnupi (G. B. Sowerby III, 1897); Drillia (Cerodrillia) burnupi (G. B. Sowerby III, 1897); Drillia burnupi (G. B. Sowerby III, 1897); Pleurotoma (Drillia) burnupi G. B. Sowerby III, 1897 (original combination); Tylotiella burnupi (G. B. Sowerby III, 1897)

= Clavus burnupi =

Species of gastropod

Clavus burnupi is a species of sea snail, a marine gastropod mollusk in the family Drilliidae.

== Description ==
The length of the shell varies between 11.2 mm and 14.2 mm.

The light to dark orange brown turreted shell is slender with an acute spire. The reddish-brown colour of the shell is relieved by an interrupted whitish band at the angle, surmounted by a thin dark brown line The shell contains 8 moderately convex whorls, that are not shouldered. The shell has a glossy surface and lacks a pale peripheral zone. The spiral threads are microscopic or absent, except on the rostrum. The 10 - 14 white axial ribs do not undulate on the base and do not weaken below the suture. The somewhat oblique and distant ribs run to the top of the whorls, and become obsolete on the lower half of the body whorl. The terminal varix is strong. The subsutural region is not contrastingly dark. The base of the body whorl is without a row of pustules. The aperture is oblong-ovate. The thin outer lip is slightly curved. The anal sulcus is U-shaped. The short siphonal canal is moderately wide.

== Distribution ==
This marine species occurs from Southern Mozambique to East Transkei, South Africa.
