= Spirotropis confusa =

Scientific classification
- Kingdom: Animalia
- Phylum: Mollusca
- Class: Gastropoda
- Subclass: Caenogastropoda
- Order: Neogastropoda
- Superfamily: Conoidea
- Family: Drilliidae
- Genus: Spirotropis
- Species: S. confusa

Binomial name
- Spirotropis confusa (Seguenza, 1880)

Synonyms
- Drillia confusa Seguenza G., 1880; Mangelia eburnea Sars M., 1859 (nvalid: junior secondary homonym of Pleurotoma eburnea Bivona, 1839; Spirotropis sarsi is a replacement name); † Pleurotoma carinata Bivona, 1838 (nomen dubium; and also invalid: junior homonym of Pleurotoma carinata Deshayes, 1834, and P. carinata Gray, 1834); Spirotropis carinata (Bivona, 1838) sensu G.O. Sars, 1878 misapplication; Spirotropis sarsi Warén, 1975

Species of gastropod

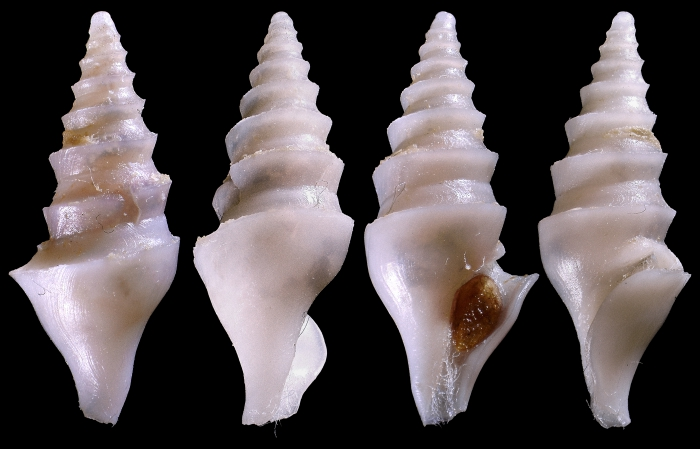
Image of the spirotropis confusa shell

Spirotropis confusa is a species of sea snail, a marine gastropod mollusk in the family Drilliidae.

== Subspecies ==
- Spirotropis confusa confusa (Seguenza, 1880)
- Spirotropis confusa sarsi Warén, 1975

== Description ==
The length of the shell attains 16 mm.

(Original description in Italian) This form, which I separate from † Gymnobela galerita (R. A. Philippi, 1844), is distinguished quite easily by being much more slender, and by having the keel of the whorls less prominent and not thinned out.

== Distribution ==
This species occurs in the demersal zone of the Mediterranean Sea.
