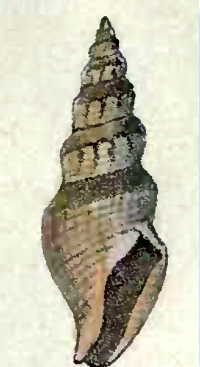
- Drawing of a shell of Bela patagonica

Scientific classification
- Kingdom: Animalia
- Phylum: Mollusca
- Class: Gastropoda
- Subclass: Caenogastropoda
- Order: Neogastropoda
- Superfamily: Conoidea
- Family: Mangeliidae
- Genus: Bela
- Species: B. patagonica

Binomial name
- Bela patagonica (d'Orbigny, 1841)

Synonyms
- Drillia patagonica (d'Orbigny, 1841); Pleurotoma patagonica d'Orbigny, 1841 (basionym); Pleurotoma (Drillia) patagonica (d'Orbigny, 1841); Spirotropis patagonica (d'Orbigny, 1841) ·

= Bela patagonica =

Species of gastropod

Bela patagonica is a species of sea snail, a marine gastropod mollusk in the family Mangeliidae.

The variety Spirotropis patagonica magellanica (Martens, E.C. von, 1881) was originally described as Drillia patagonica Martens, E.C. von, 1881 with a length half as long.

== Description ==
The shell size varies between 6 mm and 15 mm.

The shell is yellowish brown. The first whorls are globose, the third and following ones subangulated, with longitudinal short, fine ribs and close revolving striae. The ribs are obsolete on the body whorl. The sinus is broad and shallow.

== Distribution ==
This species occurs in the demersal zone of the Atlantic Ocean from Southern Brazil to Patagonia

Fossils have been found in Quaternary strata in Brazil.
