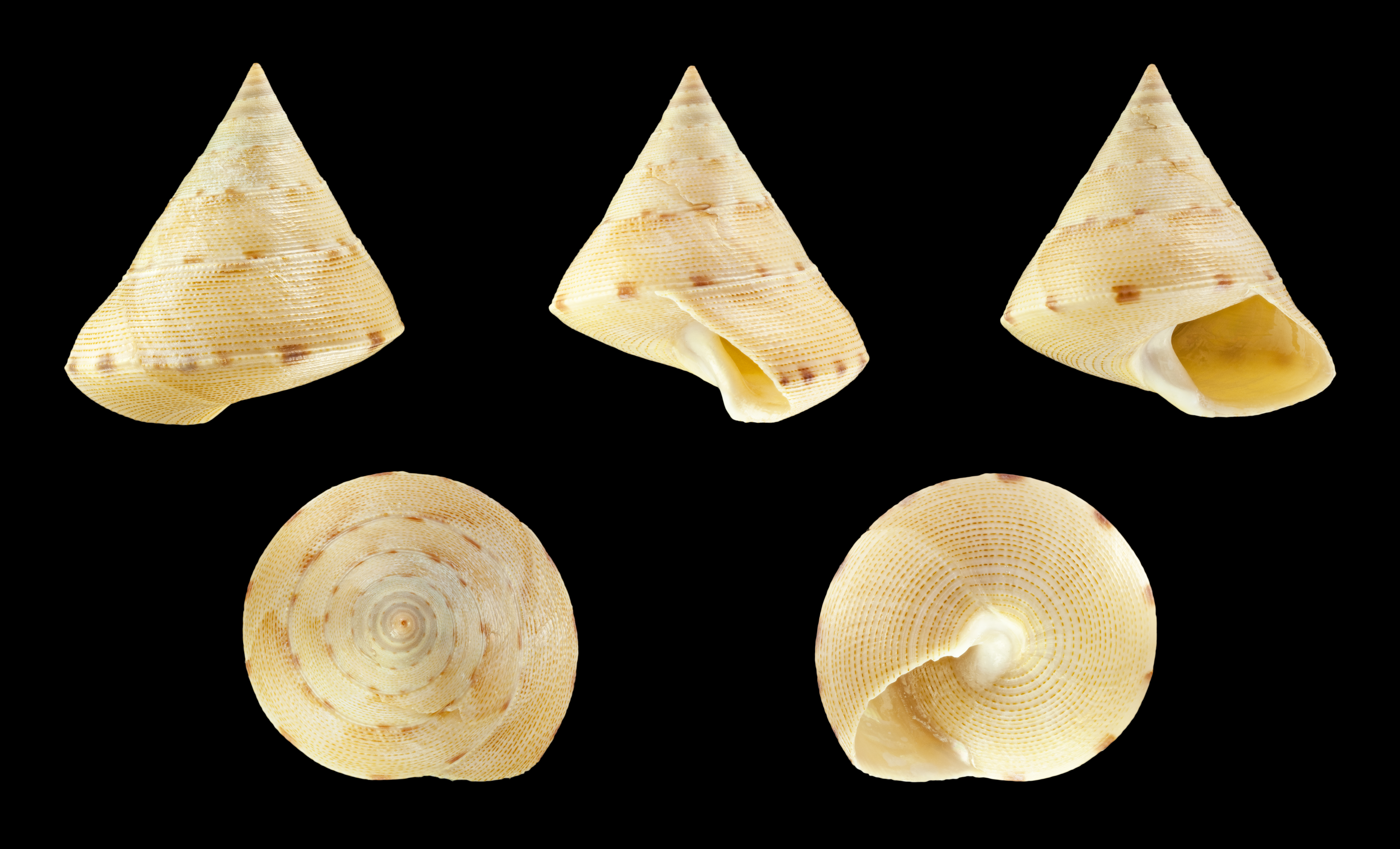
- Tristichotrochus haliarchus

Scientific classification
- Kingdom: Animalia
- Phylum: Mollusca
- Class: Gastropoda
- Subclass: Vetigastropoda
- Order: Trochida
- Superfamily: Trochoidea
- Family: Calliostomatidae
- Genus: Tristichotrochus; Ikebe, 1942

Type species
- Calliostoma aculeatum G. B. Sowerby III, 1912

Synonyms
- Calliostoma (Tristichotrochus) Ikebe, 1942

= Tristichotrochus =

Genus of gastropods

Tristichotrochus is a genus of sea snails, marine gastropod mollusks, in the family Calliostomatidae within the superfamily Trochoidea, the top snails, turban snails and their allies.

== Species ==
Species within the genus Tristichotrochus include:

- Tristichotrochus aculeatus (G. B. Sowerby III, 1912)
- Tristichotrochus consors (Lischke, 1872)
- Tristichotrochus gendalli (B. A. Marshall, 1979)
- Tristichotrochus haliarchus (Melvill, 1889)
- Tristichotrochus multiliratus (G. B. Sowerby III, 1875)
- Tristichotrochus shingawaensis (Tokunaga, 1906)
- Tristichotrochus tosaensis Kuroda & Habe, 1961
- Tristichotrochus unicus (Dunker, 1860)

The following species were brought into synonymy:

- Tristichotrochus amamiensis Sakurai, 1994: synonym of Calliostoma amamiense (Sakurai, 1994) (original combination)
- Tristichotrochus canaliculatus Sasao & Habe, 1973: synonym of Calliostoma canaliculatum (Sasao & Habe, 1973)(original combination)
- Tristichotrochus crossleyae (E. A. Smith, 1910): synonym of Calliostoma crossleyae E. A. Smith, 1910 (superseded combination)
- Tristichotrochus galea Sakurai, 1994: synonym of Calliostoma galea (Sakurai, 1994)
- Tristichotrochus hayamanus Kuroda & Habe, 1971: synonym of Calliostoma hayamanum (Kuroda & Habe, 1971) (original combination)
- Tristichotrochus ikukoae (Sakurai, 1994): synonym of Calliostoma hayamanum (Kuroda & Habe, 1971) (original combination)
- Tristichotrochus iris Kuroda & Habe in Habe, 1961: synonym of Calliostoma iris (Kuroda & Habe, 1961) (original combination)
- Tristichotrochus iwaotakii Azuma, 1961: synonym of Calliostoma iwaotakii (Azuma, 1961)
- Tristichotrochus katoi Sakurai, 1994: synonym of Calliostoma katoi (Sakurai, 1994) (original combination)
- Tristichotrochus koma Shikama & Habe, 1965: synonym of Calliostoma koma (Shikama & Habe, 1965) (superseded combination)
- Tristichotrochus levibasis Kuroda & Habe, 1971: synonym of Calliostoma levibasis (Kuroda & Habe, 1971) (superseded combination)
- Tristichotrochus margaritissimus Habe & Okutani, 1968: synonym of Calliostoma margaritissimum (Habe & Okutani, 1968) (superseded combination)
- Tristichotrochus mikikoae Kosuge & Oh-Ishi, 1970: synonym of Calliostoma mikikoae (Kosuge & Oh-Ishi, 1970)
- Tristichotrochus nakamigawai Sakurai, 1994: synonym of Calliostoma nakamigawai (Sakurai, 1994)
- Tristichotrochus problematicus Kuroda & Habe, 1971: synonym of Calliostoma problematicum (Kuroda & Habe, 1971) (superseded combination)
- Tristichotrochus sakashitai Sakurai, 1994: synonym of Calliostoma sakashitai (Sakurai, 1994) (original combination)
- Tristichotrochus sugitanii Sakurai, 1994: synonym of Calliostoma sugitanii (Sakurai, 1994) (original combination)
- Tristichotrochus takaseanus Okutani, 1972: synonym of Calliostoma takaseanum (Okutani, 1972) (original combination)
- Tristichotrochus tsuchiyai Kuroda & Habe, 1971: synonym of Calliostoma tsuchiyai (Kuroda & Habe, 1971) (original combination)
- Tristichotrochus uranipponensis Okutani, 1969: synonym of Calliostoma uranipponense (Okutani, 1969) (original combination)
