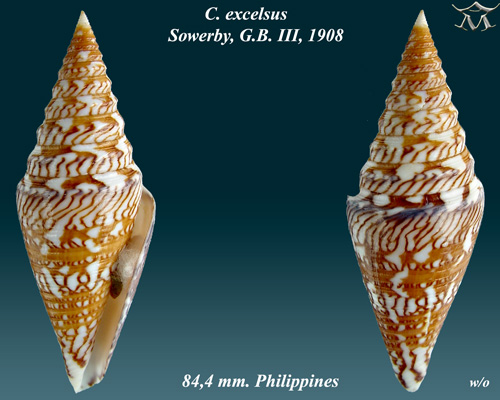
- Apertural and abapertural views of shell of Conus excelsus (G.B. Sowerby III, 1908)

Scientific classification
- Kingdom: Animalia
- Phylum: Mollusca
- Class: Gastropoda
- Subclass: Caenogastropoda
- Order: Neogastropoda
- Family: Conidae
- Genus: Conus
- Subgenus: Turriconus; Shikama & Habe, 1968

Type species
- Turriconus nakayasui Shikama & Habe, 1968

Synonyms
- Kurodaconus Shikama & T. Habe, 1968; Mitraconus J. K. Tucker & M. Tenorio, 2013; Turriconus Shikama & T. Habe, 1968; Turriconus (Kurodaconus) Shikama & Habe, 1968; Turriconus (Mitraconus) J. K. Tucker & M. Tenorio, 2013; Turriconus (Turriconus) Shikama & Habe, 1968

= Conus (Turriconus) =

Subgenus of gastropods

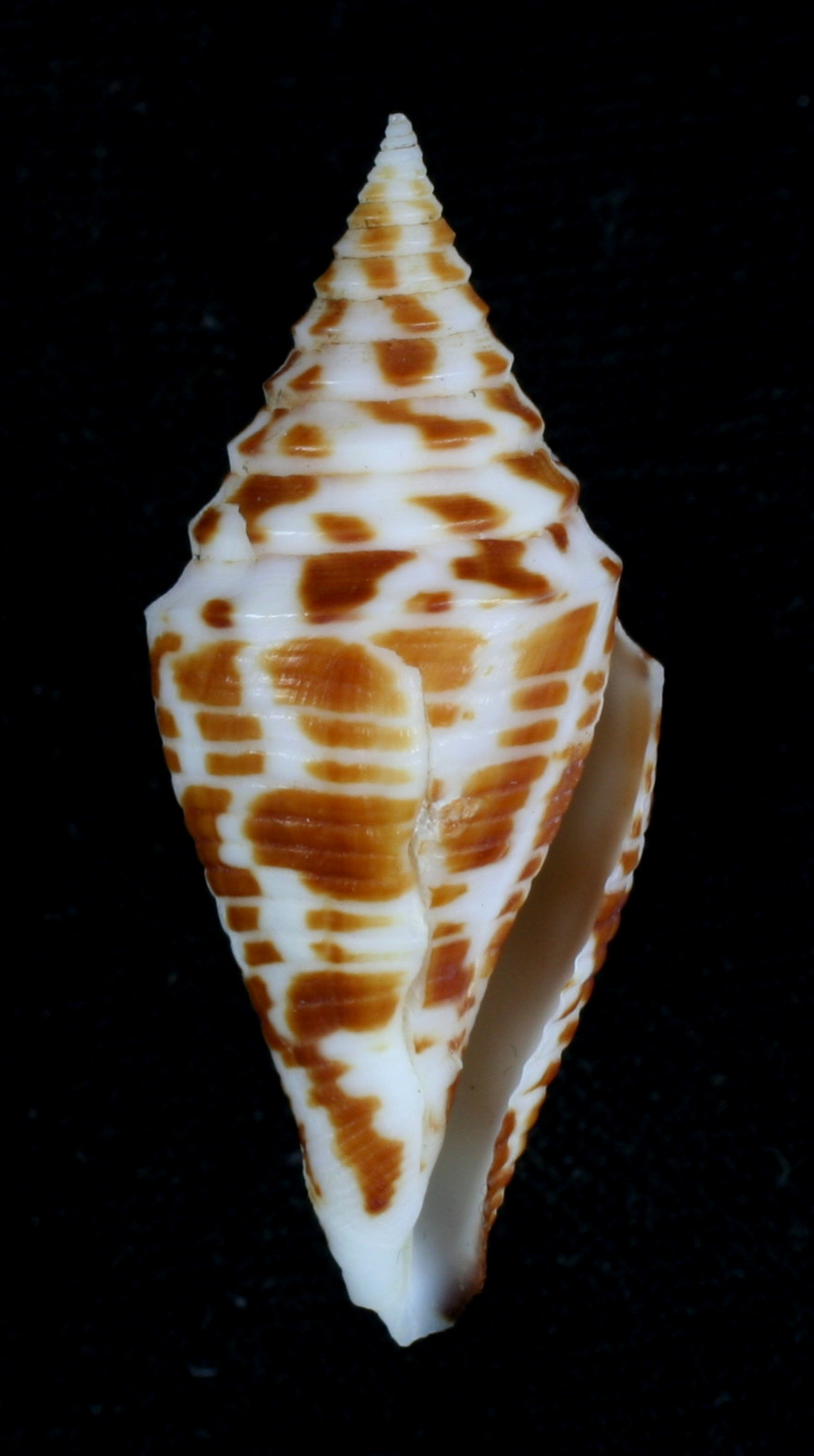
Apertural view of shell of Conus andremenezi Olivera & Biggs, 2010, measuring 37.6 mm in height, trawled at 80 fms. off Aliguay Island, in the Philippines.

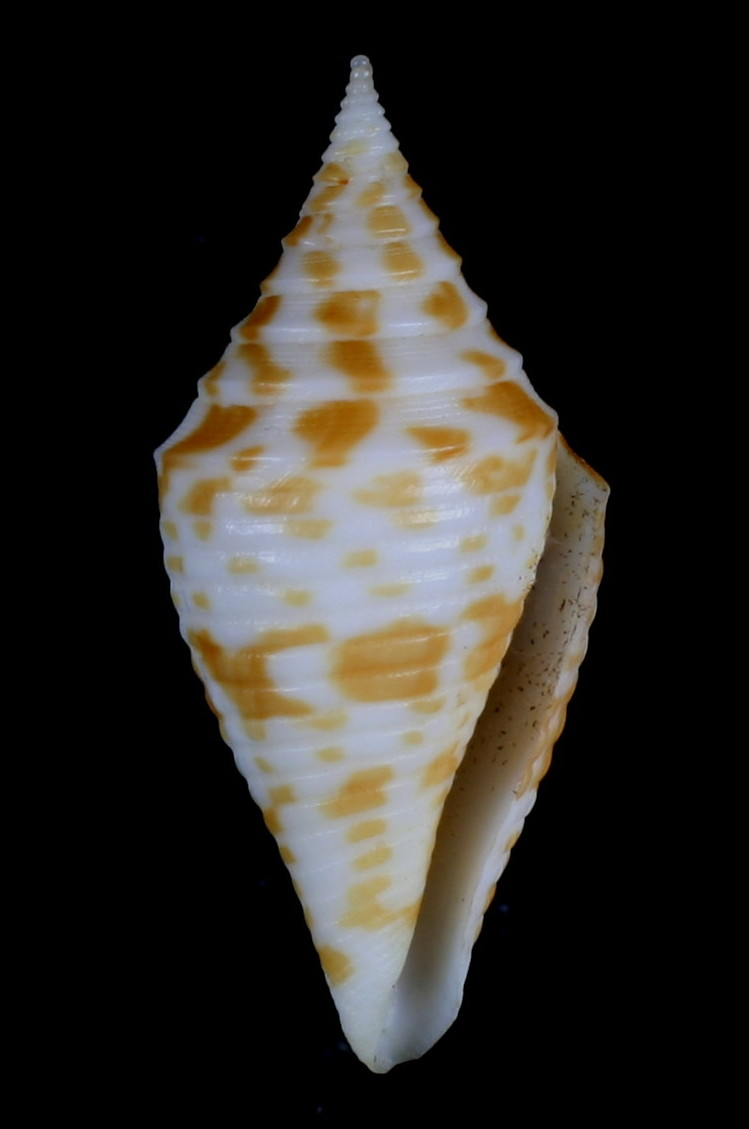
Apertural view of shell of Conus rizali Olivera & Biggs, 2010, measuring 29.3 mm in height, trawled at 80 fms. off Aliguay Island, in the Philippines.

Turriconus is a subgenus of sea snails, marine gastropod mollusks in the genus Conus, family Conidae, the cone snails and their allies.

In the latest classification of the family Conidae by Puillandre N., Duda T.F., Meyer C., Olivera B.M. & Bouchet P. (2015), Turriconus has become a subgenus of Conus as Conus (Turriconus)Shikama & Habe, 1968 (type species: Turriconus nakayasui Shikama & Habe, 1968): synonym of Conus Linnaeus, 1758

== Species ==
- Turriconus acutangulus (Lamarck, 1810): synonym of Conus acutangulus Lamarck, 1810 (alternate representation)
- Turriconus andremenezi (Olivera & Biggs, 2010): synonym of Conus andremenezi Olivera & Biggs, 2010
- Turriconus beatrix (Tenorio, Poppe & Tagaro, 2007): synonym of Conus beatrix Tenorio, Poppe & Tagaro, 2007
- Turriconus excelsus (G.B. Sowerby III, 1908): synonym of Conus excelsus G. B. Sowerby III, 1908 (alternate representation)
- Turriconus gratacapii (Pilsbry, 1904) : synonym of Conus gratacapii Pilsbry, 1904
- Turriconus milesi (E. A. Smith, 1887) : synonym of Conus milesi E. A. Smith, 1887
- Turriconus miniexcelsus (Olivera & Biggs, 2010): synonym of Conus miniexcelsus Olivera & Biggs, 2010
- Turriconus nakayasui Shikama & Habe, 1968 : synonym of Conus excelsus G. B. Sowerby III, 1908
- Turriconus praecellens (A. Adams, 1855): synonym of Conus praecellens A. Adams, 1855
- Turriconus rizali (Olivera & Biggs, 2010): synonym of Conus rizali Olivera & Biggs, 2010
