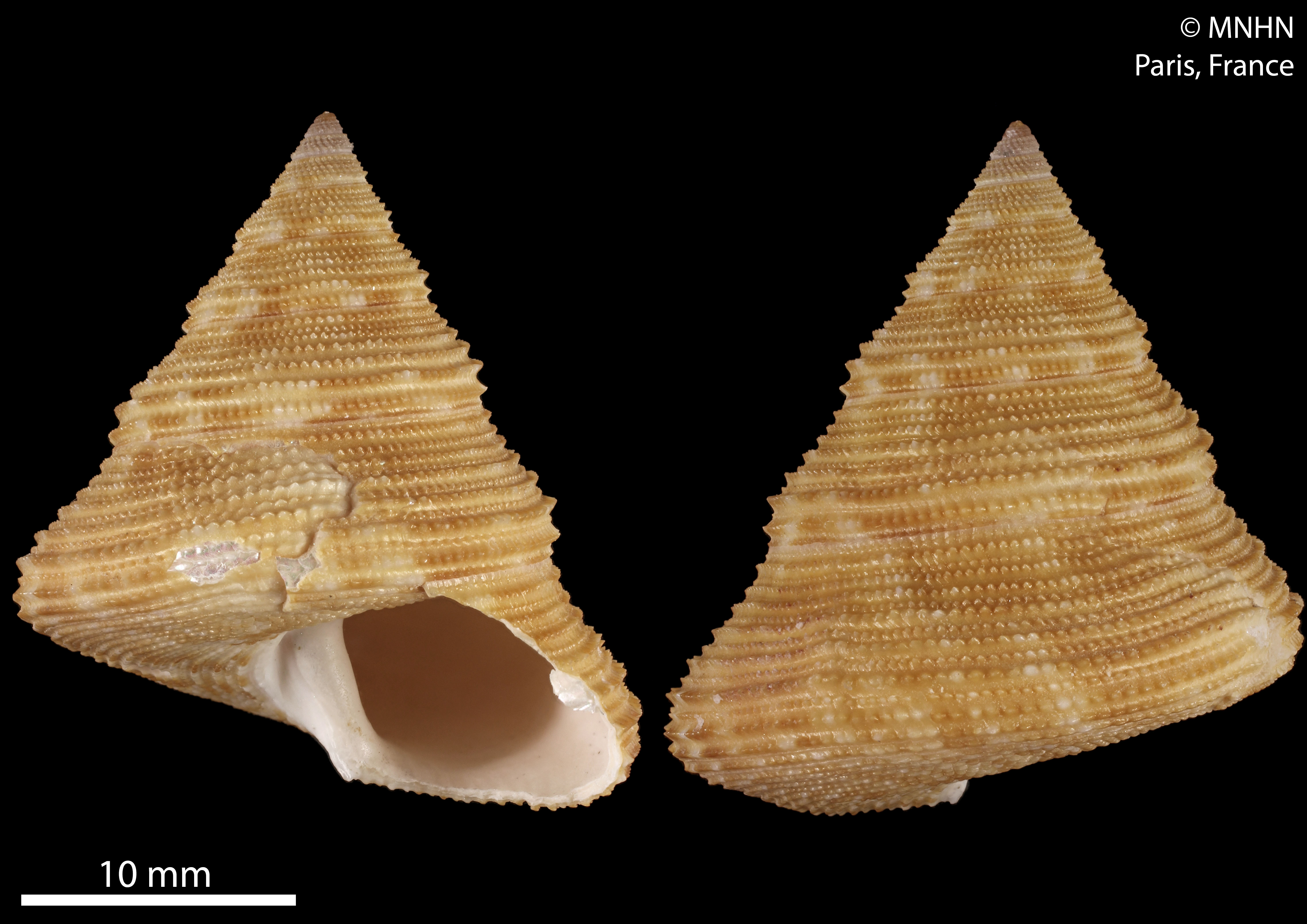
- Shell of Tristichotrochus tosaensis (specimen at MNHN, Paris)

Scientific classification
- Kingdom: Animalia
- Phylum: Mollusca
- Class: Gastropoda
- Subclass: Vetigastropoda
- Order: Trochida
- Superfamily: Trochoidea
- Family: Calliostomatidae
- Genus: Tristichotrochus
- Species: T. tosaensis

Binomial name
- Tristichotrochus tosaensis Kuroda & Habe, 1961

Synonyms
- Calliostoma (Benthastelena) tosaense (Kuroda & Habe, 1961); Calliostoma tosaense (Kuroda & Habe, 1961)

= Tristichotrochus tosaensis =

Species of gastropod

Tristichotrochus tosaensis is a species of sea snail, a marine gastropod mollusk, in the family Calliostomatidae within the superfamily Trochoidea, the top snails, turban snails and their allies.

== Description ==
The length of the shell attains 22 mm.

== Distribution ==
This marine species occurs in Tosa Bay, Japan and in the East China Sea.
