= Akoya =

Akoya may refer to:

People

- Akoya Sogi, Japanese voice actress

Other

- Akoya condominiums, is a 47-story, high-rise residential condominium located in Miami Beach
- Akoya (gastropod), a genus of sea snails
- Akoya akoya (Calliostoma akoya), a species of sea snail
- Akoya pearl oyster (Pinctada fucata), a species of pearl oyster
- LISA Akoya, a single engine light aircraft
