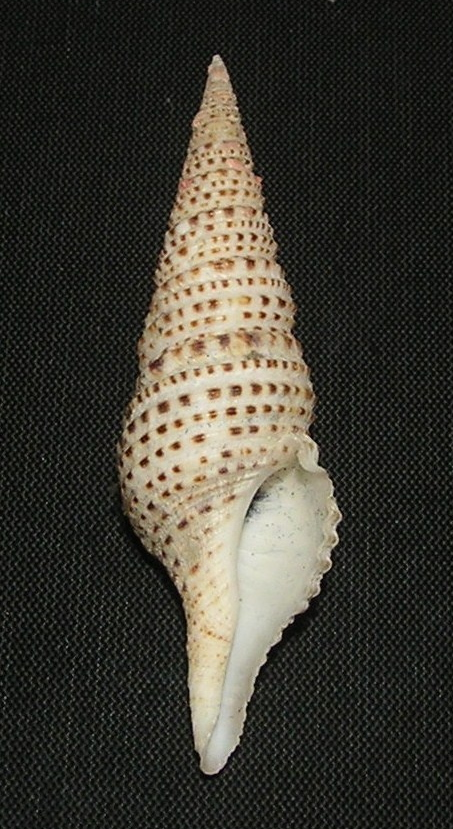
- Shell of Turris brevicanalis

Scientific classification
- Kingdom: Animalia
- Phylum: Mollusca
- Class: Gastropoda
- Subclass: Caenogastropoda
- Order: Neogastropoda
- Family: Turridae
- Genus: Turris
- Species: T. brevicanalis

Binomial name
- Turris brevicanalis (Kuroda, Habe & Oyama, 1971)

Synonyms
- Annulaturris brevicanalis Kuroda, Habe & Oyama, 1971

= Turris brevicanalis =

Species of gastropod

Turris brevicanalis is a species of sea snail, a marine gastropod mollusk in the family Turridae, the turrids.

== Ecology ==
Turris brevicanalis is a carnivorous snail that feeds on small crustaceans, worms, and other mollusks. It uses its radula, a toothed ribbon-like organ, to drill holes in the shells of its prey and inject venom. The venom of Turris brevicanalis is composed of various peptides, some of which have potential applications in medicine.

== Reproduction ==
Turris brevicanalis is a dioecious snail, meaning that it has separate male and female individuals. The snails mate by aligning their apertures and exchanging sperm. The female snail then lays eggs in capsules that are attached to rocks or other hard substrates. The eggs hatch into planktonic larvae that drift in the water column until they settle and metamorphose into juvenile snails.

== Conservation status ==
Turris brevicanalis is not considered to be threatened by the International Union for Conservation of Nature (IUCN). However, it may face some threats from habitat loss, pollution, overfishing, and invasive species. Turris brevicanalis is also collected by shell collectors for its attractive shell, which may reduce its population size.

== Description ==
The length of the shell varies between 51 mm and 70.4 mm.

== Distribution ==
This marine species occurs in the East China Sea and off Japan.
