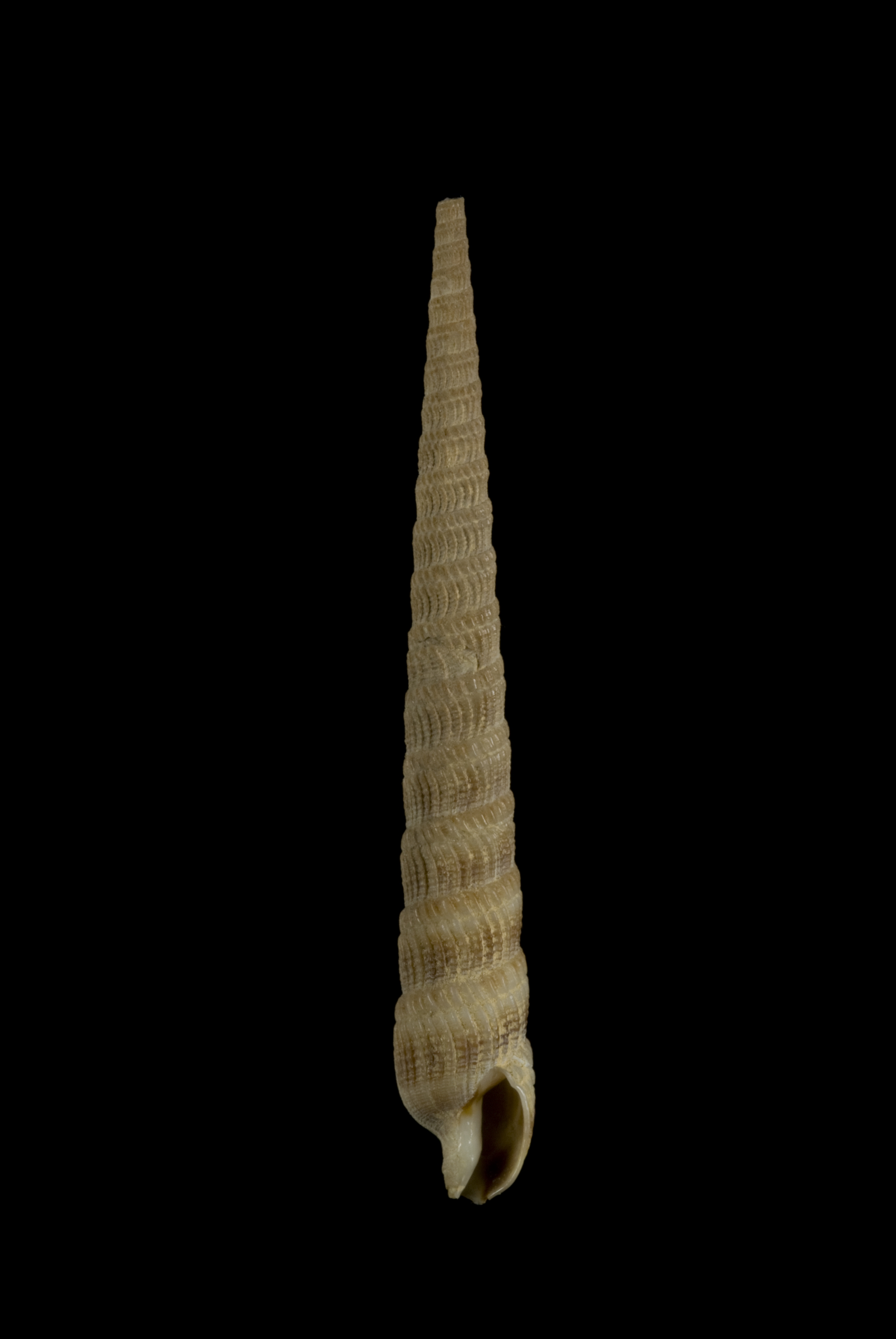
- Shell of Terebra fujitai (specimen at MNHN, Paris)

Scientific classification
- Kingdom: Animalia
- Phylum: Mollusca
- Class: Gastropoda
- Subclass: Caenogastropoda
- Order: Neogastropoda
- Family: Terebridae
- Genus: Terebra
- Species: T. fujitai

Binomial name
- Terebra fujitai Kuroda & Habe, 1952

Synonyms
- Cinguloterebra fujitai (Kuroda & Habe, 1952)

= Terebra fujitai =

Species of sea snail

Terebra fujitai is a species of sea snail, a marine gastropod mollusc in the family Terebridae, the auger snails.

== Distribution ==
This marine species occurs off New Caledonia.
