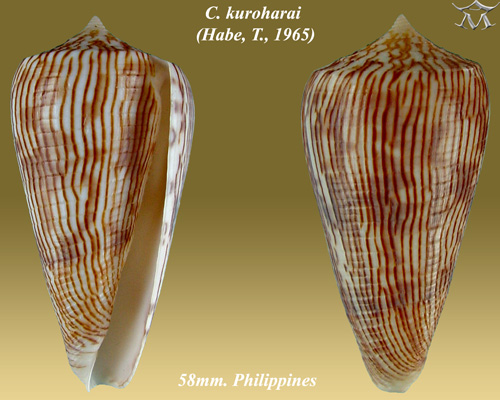
- Apertural and abapertural views of shell of Conus kuroharai (Habe, T., 1965)

Conservation status
- Least Concern (IUCN 3.1)

Scientific classification
- Kingdom: Animalia
- Phylum: Mollusca
- Class: Gastropoda
- Subclass: Caenogastropoda
- Order: Neogastropoda
- Superfamily: Conoidea
- Family: Conidae
- Genus: Conus
- Species: C. kuroharai

Binomial name
- Conus kuroharai (Habe, 1965)

Synonyms
- Asprella kuroharai Habe, 1965; Conus (Phasmoconus) kuroharai (Habe, 1965) · accepted, alternate representation; Graphiconus kuroharai (Habe, 1965) ·

= Conus kuroharai =

Species of sea snail

Conus kuroharai, common name Kurohara's cone, is a species of sea snail, a marine gastropod mollusk in the family Conidae, the cone snails and their allies.

Like all species within the genus Conus, these snails are predatory and venomous. They are capable of stinging humans, therefore live ones should be handled carefully or not at all.

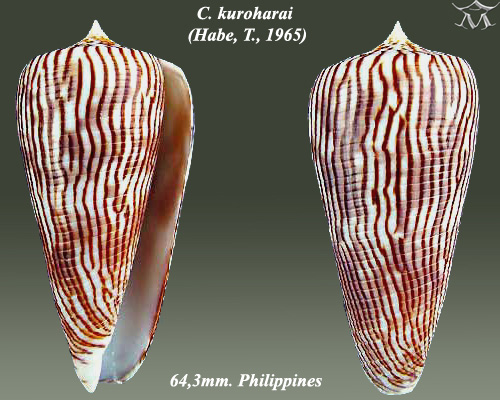
Conus kuroharai (Habe, T., 1965)

== Description ==
The size of the shell varies between 35 mm and 77 mm.

== Distribution ==
This marine species occurs off Japan, the Philippines and the Loyalty Islands.
