= Tristichotrochus crossleyae =

Scientific classification
- Kingdom: Animalia
- Phylum: Mollusca
- Class: Gastropoda
- Subclass: Vetigastropoda
- Order: Trochida
- Superfamily: Trochoidea
- Family: Calliostomatidae
- Genus: Tristichotrochus
- Species: T. crossleyae

Binomial name
- Tristichotrochus crossleyae (E. A. Smith, 1910)

Synonyms
- Calliostoma crossleyae E. A. Smith, 1910; Calliostoma ishianum Yokoyama, 1926; Calliostoma multiliratum (G. B. Sowerby III, 1875); Ziziphinus multiliratus G. B. Sowerby III, 1875

Species of gastropod

Tristichotrochus crossleyae is a species of sea snail, a marine gastropod mollusk, in the family Calliostomatidae within the superfamily Trochoidea, the top snails, turban snails and their allies.
