= Calliostoma hayamanum =

Scientific classification
- Kingdom: Animalia
- Phylum: Mollusca
- Class: Gastropoda
- Subclass: Vetigastropoda
- Order: Trochida
- Family: Calliostomatidae
- Subfamily: Calliostomatinae
- Genus: Calliostoma
- Species: C. hayamanum

Binomial name
- Calliostoma hayamanum (Kuroda & Habe, 1971 in Kuroda, Habe & Oyama, 1971)

Synonyms
- Tristichotrochus hayamanus Kuroda & Habe in Kuroda, Habe & Oyama, 1971

Species of gastropod

Calliostoma hayamanum is a species of sea snail, a marine gastropod mollusk in the family Calliostomatidae.

== Notes ==
Additional information regarding this species:

- Taxonomic remark: Some authors place this taxon in the subgenus Calliostoma (Tristichotrochus)

== Description ==
The size of the shell varies between 35 mm and 50 mm.

== Distribution ==
This marine species occurs off Japan.
