= Calliostoma tsuchiyai =

Scientific classification
- Kingdom: Animalia
- Phylum: Mollusca
- Class: Gastropoda
- Subclass: Vetigastropoda
- Order: Trochida
- Family: Calliostomatidae
- Subfamily: Calliostomatinae
- Genus: Calliostoma
- Species: C. tsuchiyai

Binomial name
- Calliostoma tsuchiyai (Kuroda & Habe)

Synonyms
- Tristichotrochus tsuchiyai Kuroda & Habe in Kuroda, Habe & Oyama, 1971

Species of gastropod

Calliostoma tsuchiyai is a species of sea snail, a marine gastropod mollusk in the family Calliostomatidae.

== Taxonomy ==
Some authors place this taxon in the subgenus Calliostoma (Tristichotrochus).

== Distribution ==
This marine species occurs off Japan.
