= Mangelia dobsoni =

Scientific classification
- Kingdom: Animalia
- Phylum: Mollusca
- Class: Gastropoda
- Subclass: Caenogastropoda
- Order: Neogastropoda
- Superfamily: Conoidea
- Family: Mangeliidae
- Genus: Mangelia
- Species: M. dobsoni

Binomial name
- Mangelia dobsoni Grabau, A.W. & S.G. King, 1928

Species of gastropod

Mangelia dobsoni is a species of sea snail, a marine gastropod mollusk in the family Mangeliidae.

This is a taxon inquirendum.

== Description ==
The figure published by Grabau and King is remarkably similar to the figure published by Dunker in 1860 as Mangelia costulata (Dunker, 1860) and now with the accepted name Mangelia dunkeri Kuroda, 1961

== Distribution ==
This marine species occurs off China.
