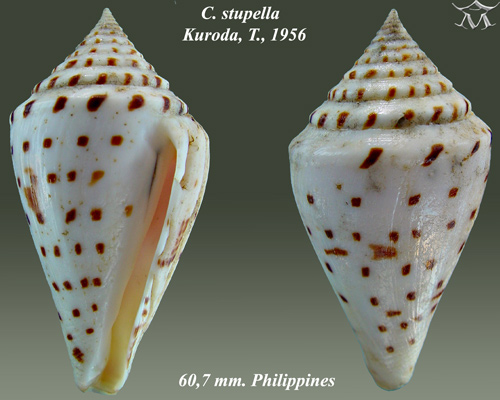
- Apertural and abapertural views of shell of Conus stupella Kuroda, T., 1956
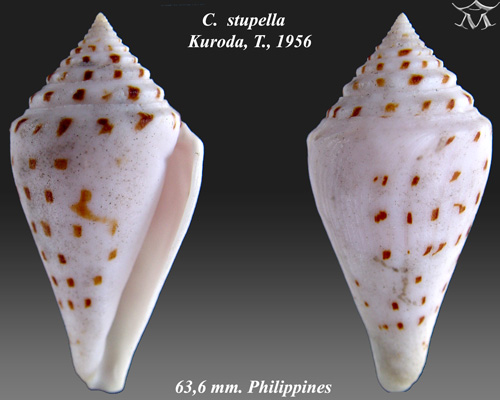

Conservation status
- Least Concern (IUCN 3.1)

Scientific classification
- Kingdom: Animalia
- Phylum: Mollusca
- Class: Gastropoda
- Subclass: Caenogastropoda
- Order: Neogastropoda
- Superfamily: Conoidea
- Family: Conidae
- Genus: Conus
- Species: C. stupella

Binomial name
- Conus stupella (Kuroda, 1956)

Synonyms
- Conus (Turriconus) stupella (Kuroda, 1956) · accepted, alternate representation; Embrikena stupella Kuroda, 1956; Kurodaconus stupella (Kuroda, 1956); Turriconus (Kurodaconus) stupella (Kuroda, 1956)

= Conus stupella =

Species of sea snail

Conus stupella, commonly named the stupella cone, is a species of sea snail, a marine gastropod mollusk in the family Conidae, the cone snails and their allies.

Like many other cone snails, Conus stupella uses a venom-loaded harpoon-like radular tooth to immobilise its prey, and though there are no specific records of human injury from this species, the general danger posed by cone-snail venom means specimens should always be treated as potentially harmful.

== Description ==
The size of the shell varies between 54 mm and 98 mm.

== Distribution ==
This marine species occurs off South Japan, Taiwan, the Philippines and Vietnam
