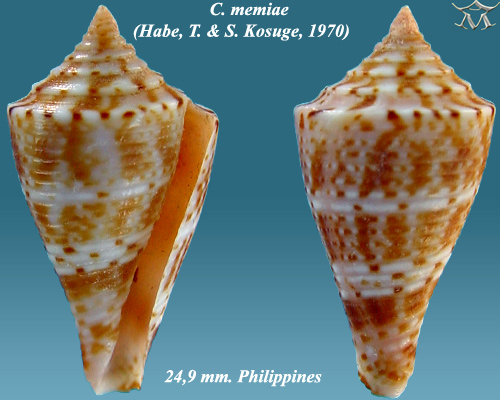
- Apertural and abapertural views of shell of Conasprella memiae (Habe, T. & S. Kosuge, 1970)
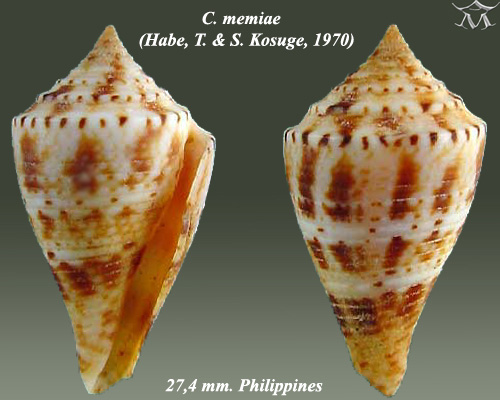

Conservation status
- Least Concern (IUCN 3.1)

Scientific classification
- Kingdom: Animalia
- Phylum: Mollusca
- Class: Gastropoda
- Subclass: Caenogastropoda
- Order: Neogastropoda
- Superfamily: Conoidea
- Family: Conidae
- Genus: Conasprella
- Species: C. memiae

Binomial name
- Conasprella memiae (Habe & Kosuge, 1970)

Synonyms
- Asprella memiae Habe & Kosuge, 1970; Conasprella (Conasprella) memiae (Habe & Kosuge, 1970) · accepted, alternate representation; Conus adonis Shikama, 1971; Conus memiae (Habe & Kosuge, 1970); Duodenticonus memiae (Habe & Kosuge, 1970); Yeddoconus memiae (Habe & Kosuge, 1970)

= Conasprella memiae =

Species of gastropod

Conasprella memiae, common name Memi's cone, is a species of sea snail, a marine gastropod mollusk in the family Conidae, the cone snails and their allies.

Like all species within the genus Conasprella, these snails are predatory and venomous. They are capable of stinging humans, therefore live ones should be handled carefully or not at all.

== Description ==
The size of the shell varies between 11 mm and 33 mm.

== Distribution ==
This marine species occurs off Japan, Indonesia, and the Fiji Islands.

== Gallery ==
Below are several color forms:

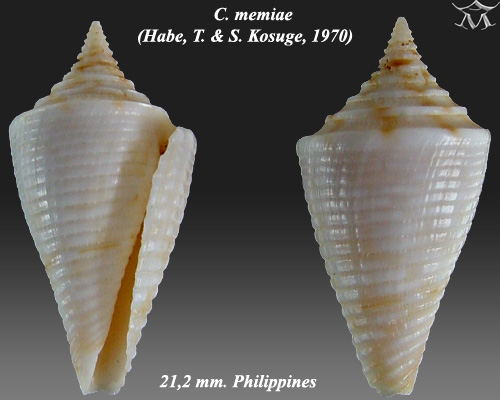
Conasprella memiae (Habe, T. & S. Kosuge, 1970)

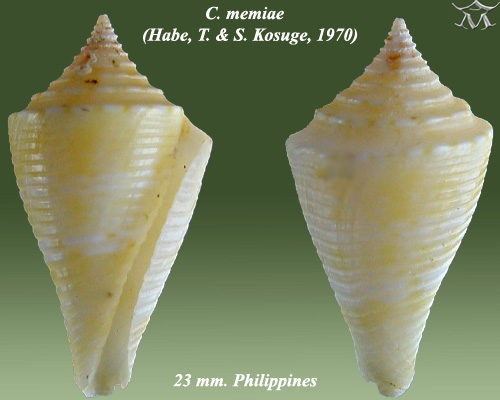
Conasprella memiae (Habe, T. & S. Kosuge, 1970)
