= Daphnella tosaensis =

Scientific classification
- Kingdom: Animalia
- Phylum: Mollusca
- Class: Gastropoda
- Subclass: Caenogastropoda
- Order: Neogastropoda
- Superfamily: Conoidea
- Family: Raphitomidae
- Genus: Daphnella
- Species: D. tosaensis

Binomial name
- Daphnella tosaensis Habe, 1962

Species of gastropod

Daphnella tosaensis is a species of sea snail, a marine gastropod mollusk in the family Raphitomidae.

== Description ==
The length of the shell attains 27 mm.

== Distribution ==
This marine species occurs off Japan and the Philippines.
