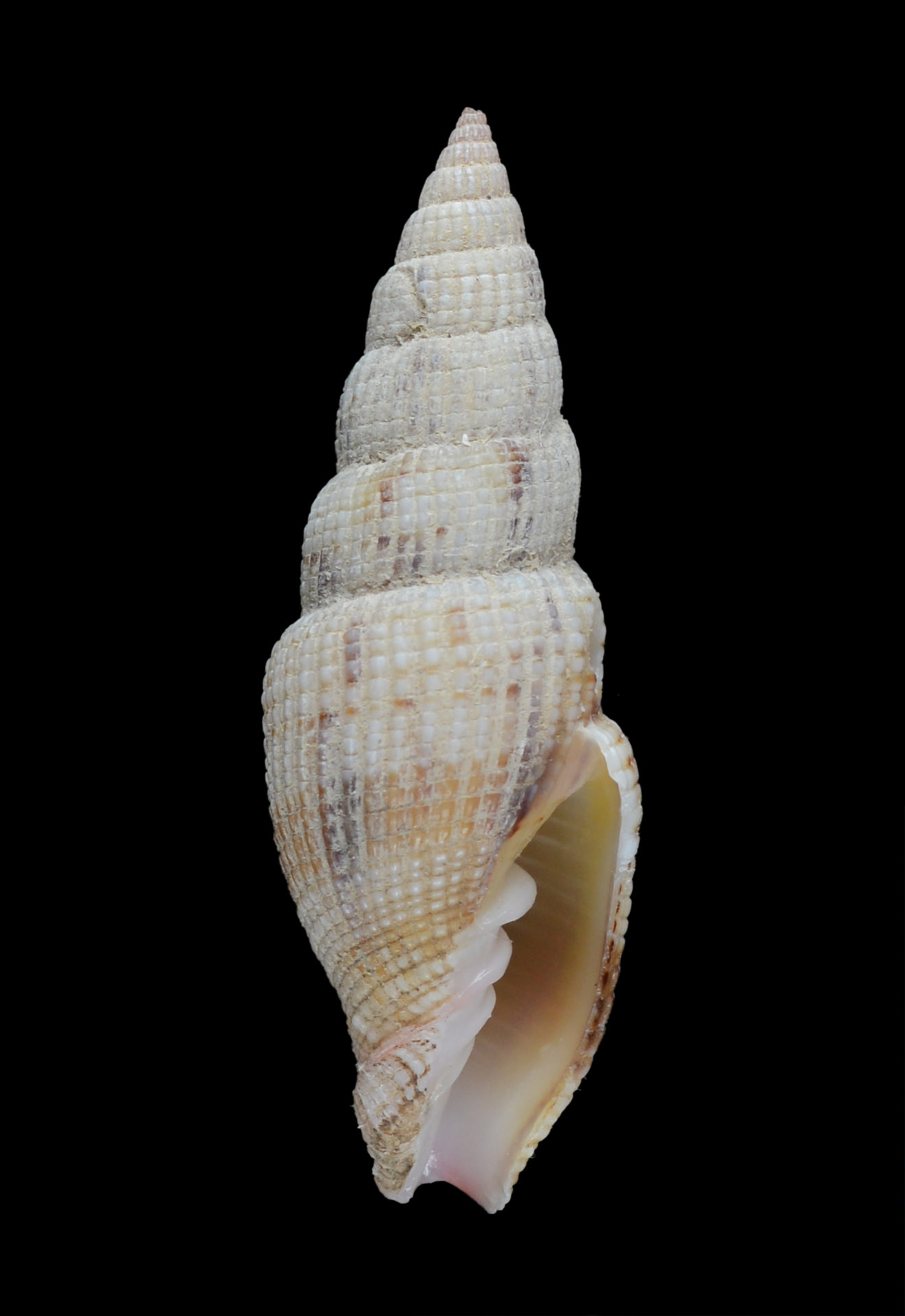
- Shell of Vexillum tokubeii (specimen at MNHN, Paris)

Scientific classification
- Kingdom: Animalia
- Phylum: Mollusca
- Class: Gastropoda
- Subclass: Caenogastropoda
- Order: Neogastropoda
- Superfamily: Turbinelloidea
- Family: Costellariidae
- Genus: Vexillum
- Species: V. tokubeii

Binomial name
- Vexillum tokubeii (Sakura & Habe, 1964)

Synonyms
- Mitropifex tokubeii Sakurai & Habe, 1964 (original combination); Vexillum (Costellaria) tokubeii (Sakurai & Habe, 1964) ·

= Vexillum tokubeii =

Species of gastropod

Vexillum tokubeii is a species of small sea snail, marine gastropod mollusk in the family Costellariidae, the ribbed miters.

== Distribution ==
This marine species occurs off Japan.
