= Calliostoma iris =

Scientific classification
- Kingdom: Animalia
- Phylum: Mollusca
- Class: Gastropoda
- Subclass: Vetigastropoda
- Order: Trochida
- Family: Calliostomatidae
- Genus: Calliostoma
- Species: C. iris

Binomial name
- Calliostoma iris (Kuroda & Habe in Habe, 1961)

Synonyms
- Tristichotrochus iris Kuroda & Habe in Habe, 1961

Species of gastropod

Calliostoma iris is a species of sea snail, a marine gastropod mollusk in the family Calliostomatidae.

Some authors place this taxon in the subgenus Calliostoma (Ampullotrochus)

== Description ==
The size of the shell varies between 20 mm and 30 mm.

== Distribution ==
This marine species occurs off Japan and New Caledonia.
