= Calliostoma babelicum =

Scientific classification
- Kingdom: Animalia
- Phylum: Mollusca
- Class: Gastropoda
- Subclass: Vetigastropoda
- Order: Trochida
- Family: Calliostomatidae
- Genus: Calliostoma
- Species: C. babelicum

Binomial name
- Calliostoma babelicum (Habe, 1961)

Synonyms
- Calliostoma (Kombologion) babelicum (Habe, T., 1961); Kombologion babelicum Habe, 1961

Species of gastropod

Calliostoma babelicum is a species of sea snail, a marine gastropod mollusk in the family Calliostomatidae. Some authors classify this taxon in the subgenus Calliostoma (Kombologion)

== Description ==
The height of the shell attains 10 mm.

== Distribution ==
This marine species occurs off Japan.
