= Calliostoma levibasis =

Scientific classification
- Kingdom: Animalia
- Phylum: Mollusca
- Class: Gastropoda
- Subclass: Vetigastropoda
- Order: Trochida
- Family: Calliostomatidae
- Subfamily: Calliostomatinae
- Genus: Calliostoma
- Species: C. levibasis

Binomial name
- Calliostoma levibasis (Kuroda & Habe, 1971 in Kuroda, Habe & Oyama)

Synonyms
- Tristichotrochus levibasis Kuroda & Habe in Kuroda, Habe & Oyama, 1971

Species of gastropod

Calliostoma levibasis is a species of sea snail, a marine gastropod mollusk in the family Calliostomatidae.

== Notes ==
Additional information regarding this species:

- Taxonomic remark: Some authors place this taxon in the subgenus Calliostoma (Tristichotrochus).
