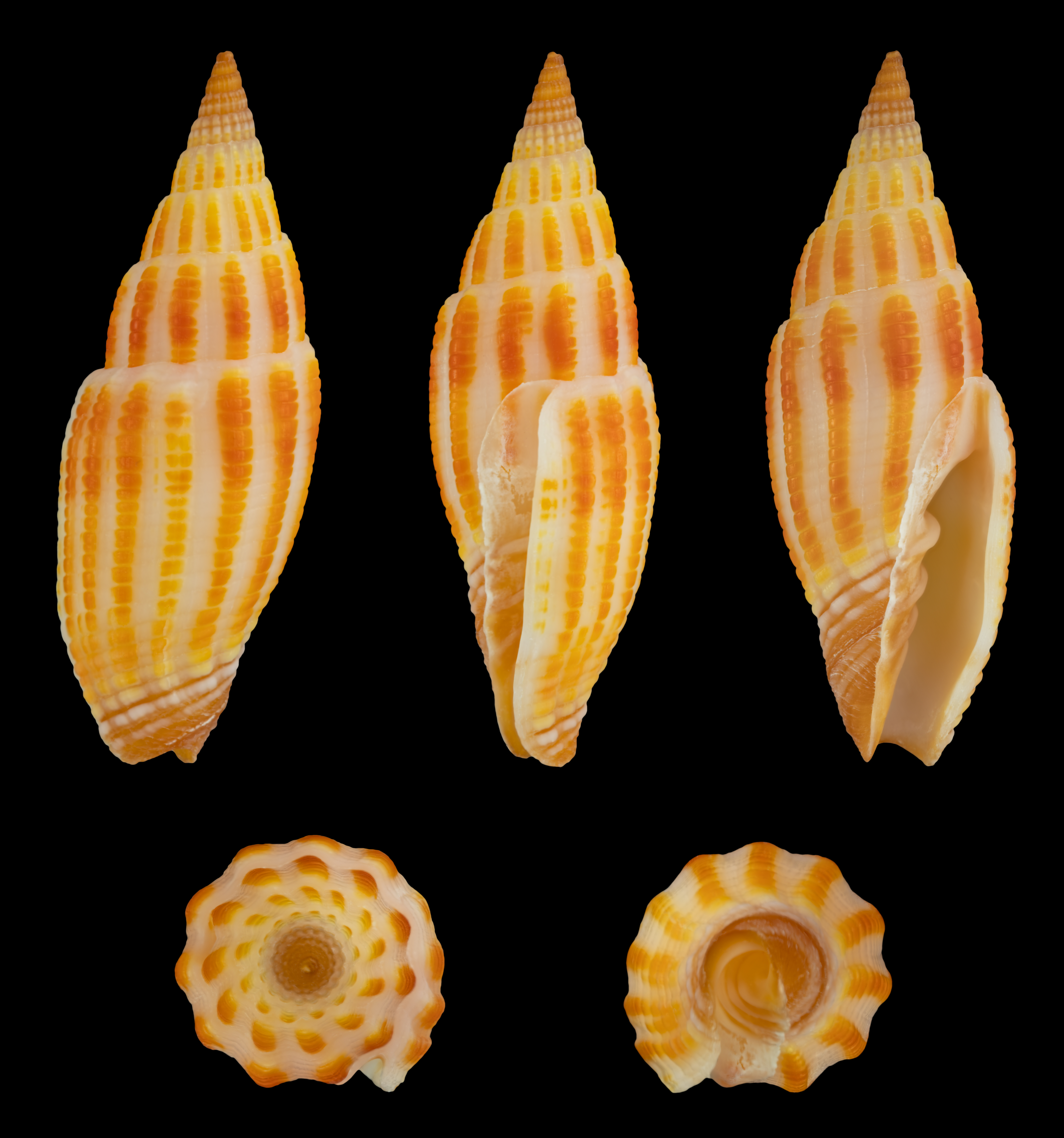

Scientific classification
- Kingdom: Animalia
- Phylum: Mollusca
- Class: Gastropoda
- Subclass: Caenogastropoda
- Order: Neogastropoda
- Superfamily: Turbinelloidea
- Family: Costellariidae
- Genus: Vexillum
- Species: V. rubrocostatum

Binomial name
- Vexillum rubrocostatum Habe & Kosuge, 1966

Synonyms
- Vexillum (Costellaria) rubrocostatum Habe & Kosuge, 1966

= Vexillum rubrocostatum =

Species of mollusc

Vexillum rubrocostatum is a species of small sea snail, marine gastropod mollusk in the family Costellariidae, the ribbed miters.

== Description ==
The length of the shell varies between 22 millimeters (mm) and 30 millimeters (mm).

== Distribution ==
This marine species are found in the Philippines and the Solomon Islands.
