= Calliostoma problematicum =

Scientific classification
- Kingdom: Animalia
- Phylum: Mollusca
- Class: Gastropoda
- Subclass: Vetigastropoda
- Order: Trochida
- Family: Calliostomatidae
- Genus: Calliostoma
- Species: C. problematicum

Binomial name
- Calliostoma problematicum (Kuroda & Habe in Kuroda, Habe & Oyama, 1971)

Synonyms
- Tristichotrochus problematicus Kuroda & Habe in Kuroda, Habe & Oyama, 1971

Species of gastropod

Calliostoma problematicum is a species of sea snail, a marine gastropod mollusk in the family Calliostomatidae.

Some authors place this taxon in the subgenus Calliostoma (Tristichotrochus)

== Description ==
The height of the shell attains 15 mm.

== Distribution ==
This marine species occurs off Japan.
