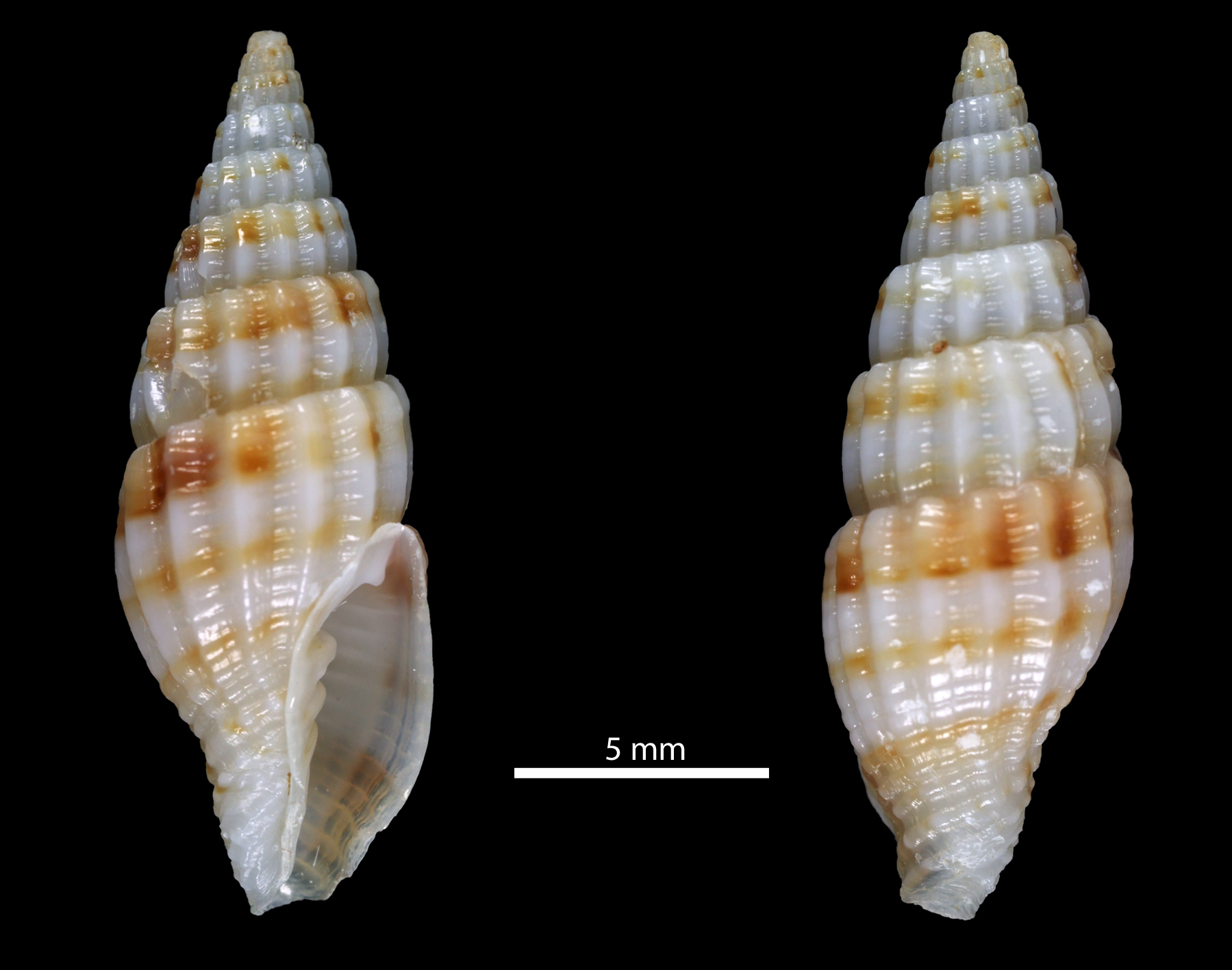

Scientific classification
- Kingdom: Animalia
- Phylum: Mollusca
- Class: Gastropoda
- Subclass: Caenogastropoda
- Order: Neogastropoda
- Superfamily: Turbinelloidea
- Family: Costellariidae
- Genus: Vexillum
- Species: V. hilare

Binomial name
- Vexillum hilare (Kuroda, 1971)

Synonyms
- Mitropifex hilaris Kuroda & Habe, 1971; Vexillum (Costellaria) hilare (Kuroda, 1971) ·

= Vexillum hilare =

Species of gastropod

Vexillum hilare is a species of small sea snail, marine gastropod mollusk in the family Costellariidae, the ribbed miters.

== Description ==
The length of the shell attains 17.6 mm.

== Distribution ==
This marine species occurs off the Philippines and in the East China Sea.
