= Drillia regia =

Scientific classification
- Kingdom: Animalia
- Phylum: Mollusca
- Class: Gastropoda
- Subclass: Caenogastropoda
- Order: Neogastropoda
- Superfamily: Conoidea
- Family: Drilliidae
- Genus: Drillia
- Species: D. regia

Binomial name
- Drillia regia (Habe & Murakami, 1970)

Synonyms
- Clavus regius Habe & Murakami, 1970 (original combination)

Species of gastropod

Drillia regia is a species of sea snail, a marine gastropod mollusk in the family Drilliidae.

The database Gastropods.com regards this species as a synonym of Neodrillia enna (W. H. Dall, 1918), in turn regarded by WoRMS as a synonym of Drillia enna (W. H. Dall, 1918).

== Description ==
The length of the shell varies between 25 mm and 60 mm.

== Distribution ==
This species occurs in the Southwestern Pacific Ocean and off the Philippines.
