= Tristichotrochus gendalli =

Scientific classification
- Kingdom: Animalia
- Phylum: Mollusca
- Class: Gastropoda
- Subclass: Vetigastropoda
- Order: Trochida
- Superfamily: Trochoidea
- Family: Calliostomatidae
- Genus: Tristichotrochus
- Species: T. gendalli

Binomial name
- Tristichotrochus gendalli (B. A. Marshall, 1979)

Synonyms
- Calliostoma (Tristichotrochus) gendalli B. A. Marshall, 1979; Calliostoma gendalli B. A. Marshall, 1979

Species of gastropod

Tristichotrochus gendalli is a species of sea snail, a marine gastropod mollusk, in the family Calliostomatidae within the superfamily Trochoidea, the top snails, turban snails and their allies.
