= Calliostoma margaritissimum =

Scientific classification
- Kingdom: Animalia
- Phylum: Mollusca
- Class: Gastropoda
- Subclass: Vetigastropoda
- Order: Trochida
- Family: Calliostomatidae
- Genus: Calliostoma
- Species: C. margaritissimum

Binomial name
- Calliostoma margaritissimum (Habe & Okutani, 1968)

Synonyms
- Calliostoma (Calliostoma) margaritissimus (Habe & Okutani, 1968); Calliostoma (Tristichotrochus) margaritissimum (Habe & Okutani, 1968); Tristichotrochus margaritissimus Habe & Okutani, 1968

Species of gastropod

Calliostoma margaritissimum is a species of sea snail, a marine gastropod mollusk in the family Calliostomatidae.

== Distribution ==
This marine species occurs off Japan.
