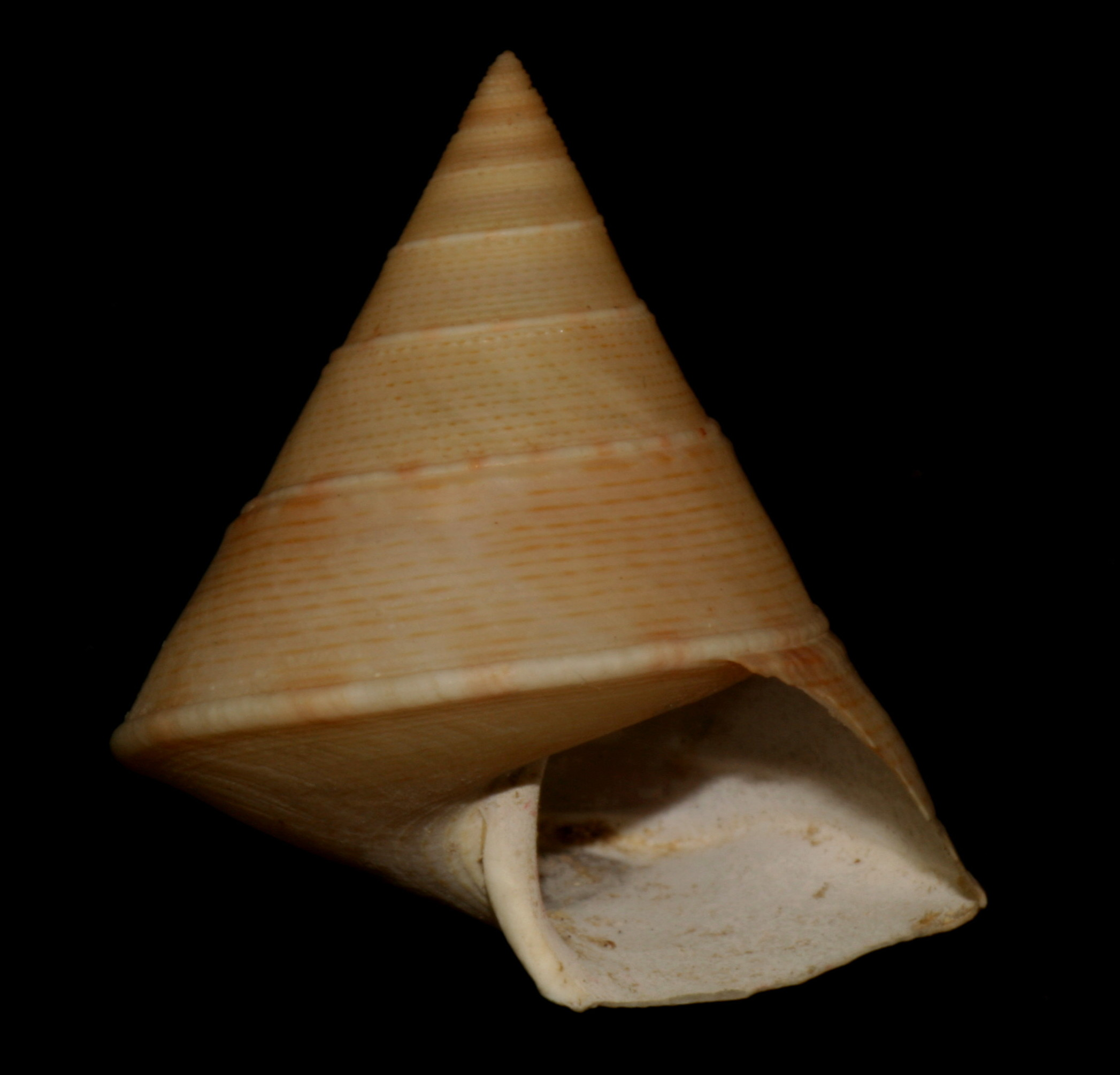
- Shell of Akoya haliarchus

Scientific classification
- Kingdom: Animalia
- Phylum: Mollusca
- Class: Gastropoda
- Subclass: Vetigastropoda
- Order: Trochida
- Superfamily: Trochoidea
- Family: Calliostomatidae
- Subfamily: Calliostomatinae
- Genus: Akoya; Habe, 1961

Synonyms
- Calliostoma (Akoya) Habe, 1961

= Akoya (gastropod) =

Genus of gastropods

Akoya is a genus of sea snails, marine gastropod mollusks, in the family Calliostomatidae within the superfamily Trochoidea, the top snails, turban snails and their allies.

== Species ==
Species within the genus Akoya (gastropod) include:

- Akoya akoya (Kuroda, 1942)
- Akoya haliarchus (Melvill, 1889)
- Akoya platinum (Dall, 1890)
- Akoya zhui Vilvens, 2024

The following species were brought into synonymy:

- Akoya shinayaka Habe, 1961
