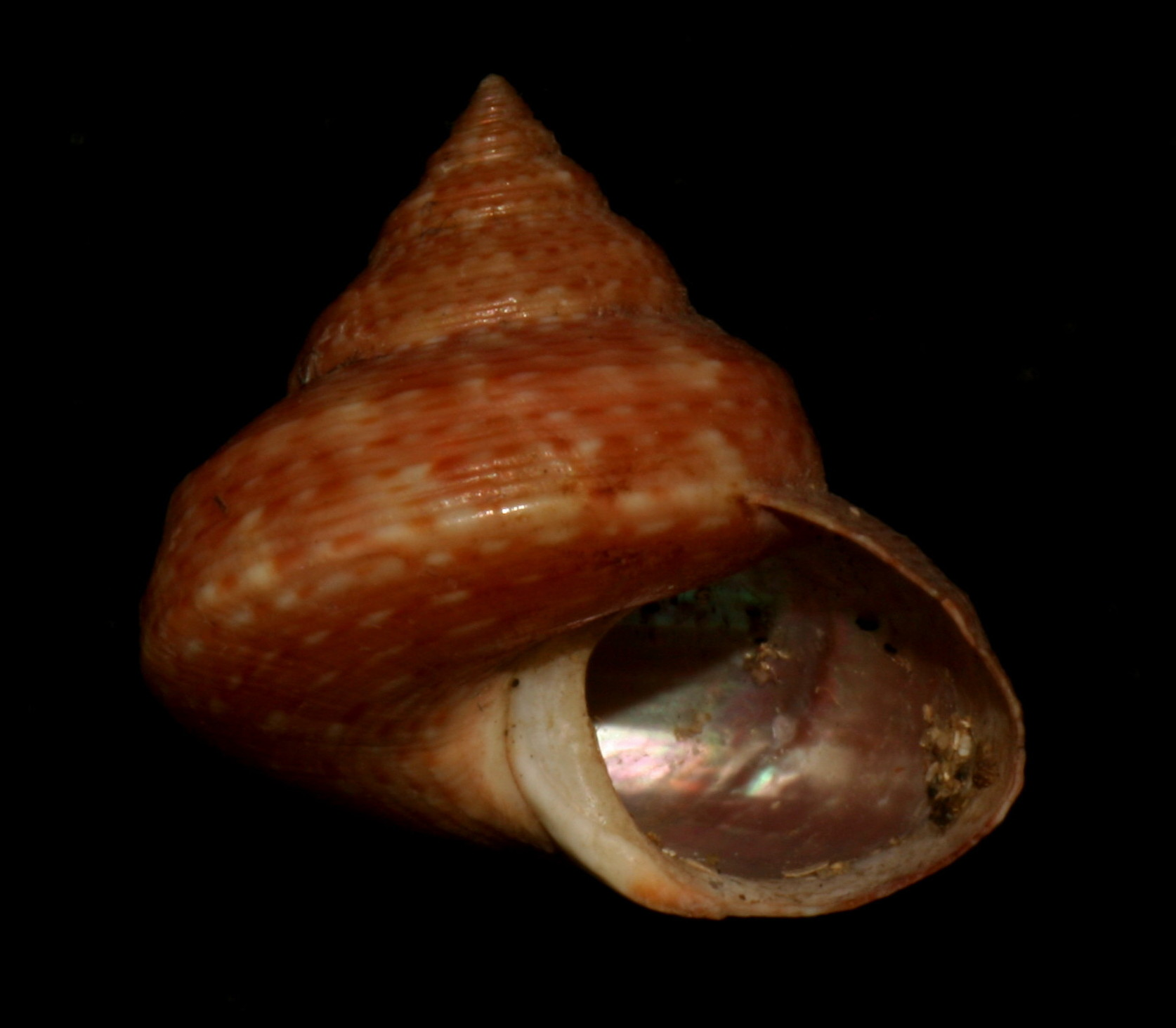
- Shell of Calliostoma consors (Lischke, 1872), 20.4 mm height by 20.5 mm diameter, from Enshū Nada, Japan

Scientific classification
- Kingdom: Animalia
- Phylum: Mollusca
- Class: Gastropoda
- Subclass: Vetigastropoda
- Order: Trochida
- Family: Calliostomatidae
- Genus: Tristichotrochus
- Species: T. consors

Binomial name
- Tristichotrochus consors (Lischke, 1872)

Synonyms
- Calliostoma consors (Lischke, 1872); Calliostoma hungerfordi Sowerby, 1888; Calliostoma sagamianum Yokoyama, 1920; Calliostoma kiiense Ikebe, 1942; Trochus consors Lischke, 1872 (original description)

= Tristichotrochus consors =

Species of mollusc

Tristichotrochus consors is a species of sea snail, a marine gastropod mollusk in the family Calliostomatidae.

== Description ==
The height of the shell attains 20 mm. The imperforate, rather thin shell has a broadly conical shape with a concave shoulder and a rounded carination. The apex is acute. Overall the shell is a medium brown in color or pale tawny, flamed with deeper color, and articulated on the riblets with dark dots . The shell is sculpted with smooth spiral threads which have light brown and dark brown dashes. The shell is encircled by very many narrow, unequal, subtly granulose or crenulated riblets, as wide or narrower than the interspaces. The 8 whorls are separated by a not profound suture. They are margined, and acutely angled in the middle. The body whorl is wide, furnished with another angle on the base. The base is convex, and multi-lirate. The umbilicus is closed and is a bone to ivory color, and the interior is brightly nacreous. The aperture is rhomboid-orbicular. The pearly columella is arcuate, bordered outside by a semilunar pit. The throat is obsoletely sulcated, nearly smooth.

== Distribution ==
Northern Honshu, Japan southwards; Oga Peninsula, Japan Sea; Seto inland sea, Korea. Found at 10 to 100 m on coarse sand and stone.; in the East China Sea.
