= Akoya akoya =

Scientific classification
- Kingdom: Animalia
- Phylum: Mollusca
- Class: Gastropoda
- Subclass: Vetigastropoda
- Order: Trochida
- Superfamily: Trochoidea
- Family: Calliostomatidae
- Subfamily: Calliostomatinae
- Genus: Akoya
- Species: A. akoya

Binomial name
- Akoya akoya (Kuroda, 1942)

Synonyms
- Akoya shinayaka Habe, 1961; Calliostoma akoya Kuroda, 1942

Species of gastropod

Akoya akoya is a species of sea snail, a marine gastropod mollusk, in the family Calliostomatidae within the superfamily Trochoidea, the top snails, turban snails and their allies.

== Distribution ==
This species occurs in Japan.
