= Akoya platinum =

Scientific classification
- Kingdom: Animalia
- Phylum: Mollusca
- Class: Gastropoda
- Subclass: Vetigastropoda
- Order: Trochida
- Family: Calliostomatidae
- Subfamily: Calliostomatinae
- Genus: Akoya
- Species: A. platinum

Binomial name
- Akoya platinum (Dall, 1890)

Synonyms
- Calliostoma bernardi J. H. McLean, 1984; Calliostoma platinum Dall, 1890; Calliostoma titanium J. H. McLean, 1984

Species of gastropod

Akoya platinum is a species of sea snail, a marine gastropod mollusk in the family Calliostomatidae. This species occurs in the Pacific Ocean off Santa Catalina Island, California, U.S.
