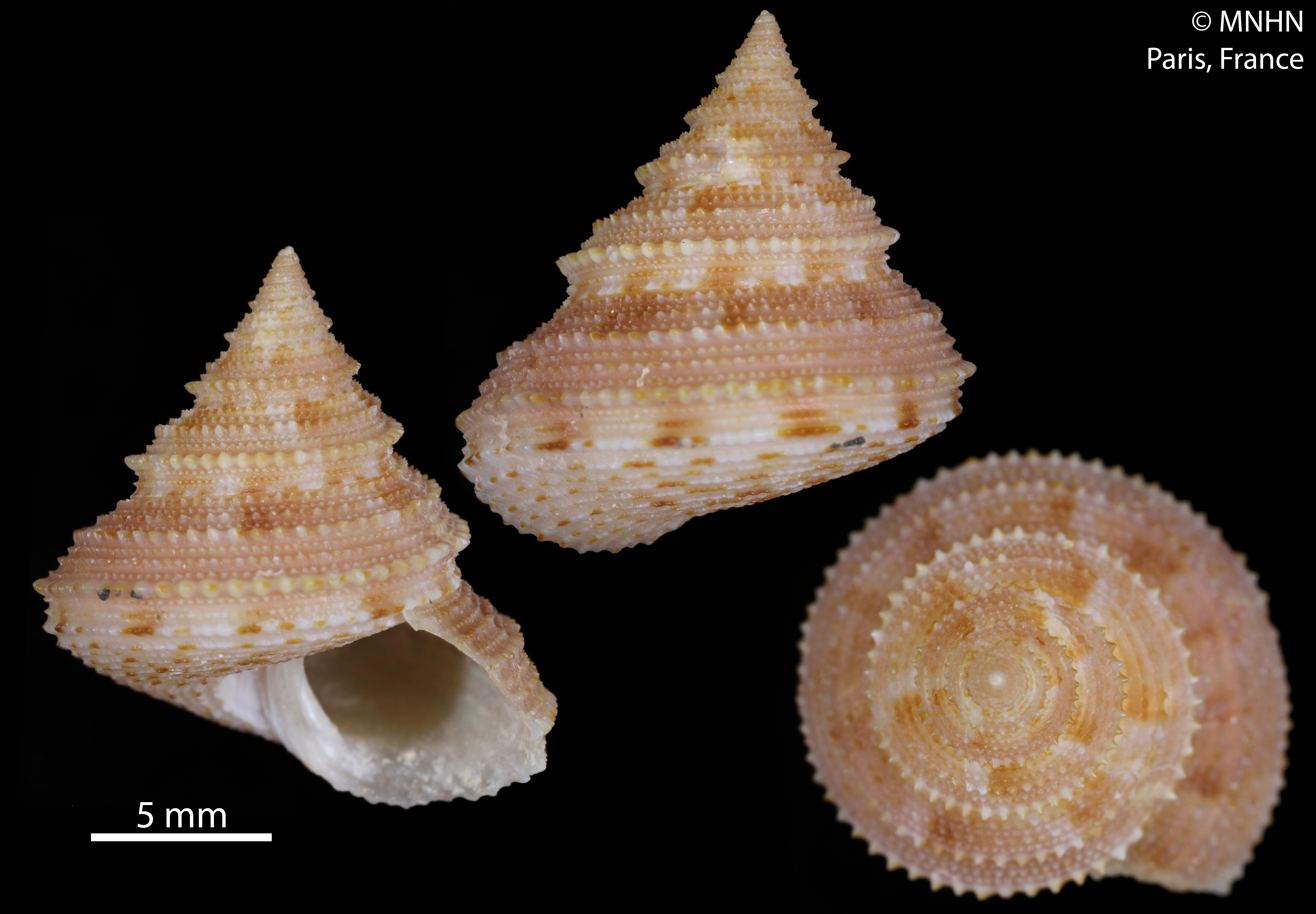
- shell of Tristichotrochus aculeatus aliguayensis (paratype at MNHN, Paris)

Scientific classification
- Kingdom: Animalia
- Phylum: Mollusca
- Class: Gastropoda
- Subclass: Vetigastropoda
- Order: Trochida
- Family: Calliostomatidae
- Genus: Tristichotrochus
- Species: T. aculeatus

Binomial name
- Tristichotrochus aculeatus (G.B. Sowerby III, 1912)

Synonyms
- Calliostoma aculeatum aculeatum G.B. Sowerby III, 1912; Calliostoma (Calliostoma) aculeatum G.B. Sowerby III, 1912; Calliostoma (Tristichotrochus) aculeatum aculeatum (G.B. Sowerby III, 1912); Tristichotrochus aculeatus aculeatus (G. B. Sowerby III, 1912)· accepted, alternate representation

= Tristichotrochus aculeatus =

Species of gastropod

Tristichotrochus aculeatus, common name the prickly Japanese top shell, is a species of medium-sized deepwater sea snail, a marine gastropod mollusk in the subfamily Calliostomatinae of the family Calliostomatidae.

Subspecies

- Tristichotrochus aculeatus aculeatus (G. B. Sowerby III, 1912)
- Tristichotrochus aculeatus aliguayensis (Poppe, Tagaro & Dekker, 2006)

== Shell description ==
The shell is conical, with straight spire outlines, and six whorls. The external shell coloration is light brown, with darker brown irregular flecks. The shell height is up to 22 mm, and the width is up to 15 mm.

== Distribution ==
This marine species lives off the Philippines. It is found off Aliguay Island, Mindanao. It lives at depths of about 100 m on muddy sand bottoms. It also occurs off southern Japan and Taiwan.
