= Calliostoma koma =

Scientific classification
- Kingdom: Animalia
- Phylum: Mollusca
- Class: Gastropoda
- Subclass: Vetigastropoda
- Order: Trochida
- Family: Calliostomatidae
- Genus: Calliostoma
- Species: C. koma

Binomial name
- Calliostoma koma (Shikama & Habe. 1965)

Synonyms
- Calliostoma (Benthastelena) koma (Shikama, T. & T. Habe, 1965); Tristichotrochus koma Shikama & Habe, 1965

Species of gastropod

Calliostoma koma is a species of sea snail, a marine gastropod mollusk in the family Calliostomatidae.

Some authors place this taxon in the subgenus Calliostoma (Tristichotrochus)

== Description ==
The size of the shell varies between 18 mm and 30 mm.

== Distribution ==
This marine species occurs off Taiwan, Southern Japan; in the East China Sea and the Yellow Sea.
