= Tristichotrochus unicus =

Scientific classification
- Kingdom: Animalia
- Phylum: Mollusca
- Class: Gastropoda
- Subclass: Vetigastropoda
- Order: Trochida
- Superfamily: Trochoidea
- Family: Calliostomatidae
- Genus: Tristichotrochus
- Species: T. unicus

Binomial name
- Tristichotrochus unicus (Dunker, 1860)

Synonyms
- Calliostoma affinis Dall, 1872; Calliostoma cecillei Nomura & Hatai, 1935; Calliostoma unicum (Dunker, 1860); Trochus unicus Dunker, 1860

Species of gastropod

Tristichotrochus unicus is a species of sea snail, a marine gastropod mollusk, in the family Calliostomatidae within the superfamily Trochoidea, the top snails, turban snails and their allies.
