= Mangelia dunkeri =

Scientific classification
- Kingdom: Animalia
- Phylum: Mollusca
- Class: Gastropoda
- Subclass: Caenogastropoda
- Order: Neogastropoda
- Superfamily: Conoidea
- Family: Mangeliidae
- Genus: Mangelia
- Species: M. dunkeri

Binomial name
- Mangelia dunkeri Kuroda, 1961

Synonyms
- Cytharella costulata (Dunker, R.W., 1860); Mangelia costulata R.W. Dunker, 1860

Species of gastropod

Mangelia dunkeri is a species of sea snail, a marine gastropod mollusk in the family Mangeliidae.

== Description ==
The length of the shell attains 10 mm.

== Distribution ==
This marine species occurs off Japan, Korea and the Philippines.
