= Tristichotrochus shingawaensis =

Scientific classification
- Kingdom: Animalia
- Phylum: Mollusca
- Class: Gastropoda
- Subclass: Vetigastropoda
- Order: Trochida
- Superfamily: Trochoidea
- Family: Calliostomatidae
- Genus: Tristichotrochus
- Species: T. shingawaensis

Binomial name
- Tristichotrochus shingawaensis (Tokunaga, 1906)

Species of gastropod

Tristichotrochus shingawaensis is a species of sea snail, a marine gastropod mollusk, in the family Calliostomatidae within the superfamily Trochoidea, the top snails, turban snails and their allies.
