= Calliostoma sakashitai =

Scientific classification
- Kingdom: Animalia
- Phylum: Mollusca
- Class: Gastropoda
- Subclass: Vetigastropoda
- Order: Trochida
- Family: Calliostomatidae
- Genus: Calliostoma
- Species: C. sakashitai

Binomial name
- Calliostoma sakashitai (Sakurai, 1994)

Synonyms
- Calliostoma (Calliostoma) sakashitai (Sakurai, 1994); Tristichotrochus sakashitai Sakurai, 1994

Species of gastropod

Calliostoma sakashitai is a species of sea snail, a marine gastropod mollusk in the family Calliostomatidae.

Some authors place this taxon in the subgenus Calliostoma (Tristichotrochus).

== Description ==
The length of the shell varies between 6 mm and 13 mm.

== Distribution ==
This marine species occurs off Japan and the Philippines.
