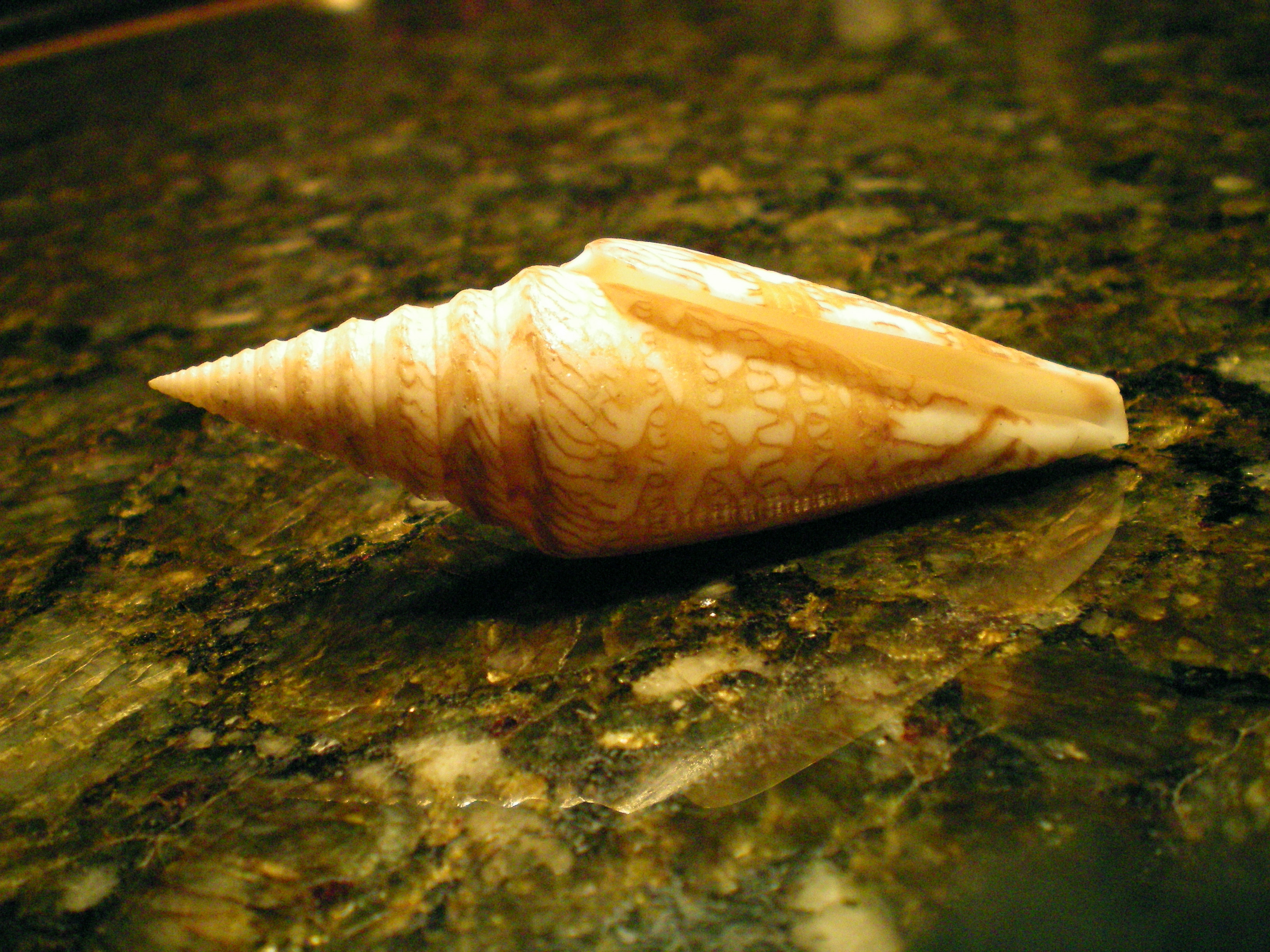
- The shell of Conus excelsus

Conservation status
- Least Concern (IUCN 3.1)

Scientific classification
- Kingdom: Animalia
- Phylum: Mollusca
- Class: Gastropoda
- Subclass: Caenogastropoda
- Order: Neogastropoda
- Superfamily: Conoidea
- Family: Conidae
- Genus: Conus
- Species: C. excelsus

Binomial name
- Conus excelsus Sowerby III, 1908

Synonyms
- Asprella tannaensis Cotton, 1945; Conus pulcherrimus Brazier, 1894 (invalid: junior homonym of Conus pulcherrimus Heilprin, 1879); Conus (Turriconus) excelsus G. B. Sowerby III, 1908 · accepted, alternate representation; Kenyonia pulcherrima Brazier, 1896; Turriconus excelsus (G. B. Sowerby III, 1908); Turriconus nakayasui Shikama & Habe, 1968

= Conus excelsus =

Species of sea snail

Conus excelsus, commonly known as the excelsior cone or illustrious cone, is a species of predatory sea snail, a marine gastropod mollusk in the family Conidae, the cone snails.

== Shell description ==
The shell has a very high spire, with a size varying between 28 mm and 102 mm, compared to most cone shells, and thus it is exceptionally long relative to its width. This, and its overall rarity, makes it desirable to shell collectors. Its coloration consists of orangish to yellow pattern on a white background.

== Distribution ==
Conus excelsus is an Indo-Pacific species found principally around the Philippines, but also as north as southern Japan and as far east as New Guinea and the Solomon Islands. it also occurs off Queensland, Australia

The species is rare but not endangered.

== Gallery ==
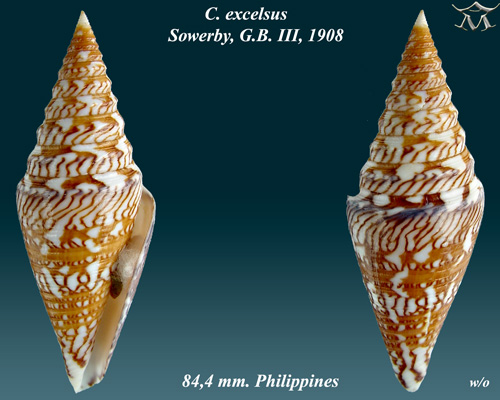
Conus excelsus Sowerby, G.B. III, 1908

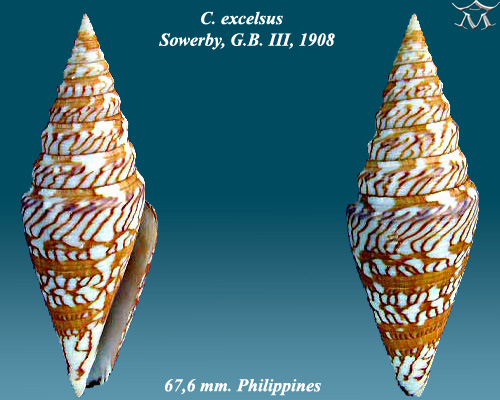
Conus excelsus Sowerby, G.B. III, 1908
