= Calliostoma sugitanii =

Scientific classification
- Kingdom: Animalia
- Phylum: Mollusca
- Class: Gastropoda
- Subclass: Vetigastropoda
- Order: Trochida
- Family: Calliostomatidae
- Genus: Calliostoma
- Species: C. sugitanii

Binomial name
- Calliostoma sugitanii (Sakurai, 1994)

Synonyms
- Calliostoma (Benthastelena) sugitanii Sakurai, 1994; Tristichotrochus sugitanii Sakurai, 1994

Species of gastropod

Calliostoma sugitanii is a species of sea snail, a marine gastropod mollusk in the family Calliostomatidae.

Some authors place this taxon in the subgenus Calliostoma (Tristichotrochus).
