= Calliostoma uranipponense =

Scientific classification
- Kingdom: Animalia
- Phylum: Mollusca
- Class: Gastropoda
- Subclass: Vetigastropoda
- Order: Trochida
- Family: Calliostomatidae
- Genus: Calliostoma
- Species: C. uranipponense

Binomial name
- Calliostoma uranipponense Okutani, 1969

Synonyms
- Calliostoma (Calliostoma) uranipponensis Okutani, 1969; Tristichotrochus uranipponensis Okutani, 1969

Species of gastropod

Calliostoma uranipponense is a species of sea snail, a marine gastropod mollusc in the family Calliostomatidae.

Some authors place this taxon in the subgenus Calliostoma (Tristichotrochus)

== Distribution ==
This marine species occurs off Japan.
