= Calliostoma galea =

Scientific classification
- Kingdom: Animalia
- Phylum: Mollusca
- Class: Gastropoda
- Subclass: Vetigastropoda
- Order: Trochida
- Family: Calliostomatidae
- Genus: Calliostoma
- Species: C. galea

Binomial name
- Calliostoma galea (Sakurai, 1994)

Synonyms
- Tristichotrochus galea Sakurai, 1994 (original combination)

Species of gastropod

Calliostoma galea is a species of sea snail, a marine gastropod mollusk in the family Calliostomatidae.

Some authors place this taxon in the subgenus Calliostoma (Benthastelena).

== Distribution ==
This marine species occurs off Japan and Taiwan.
