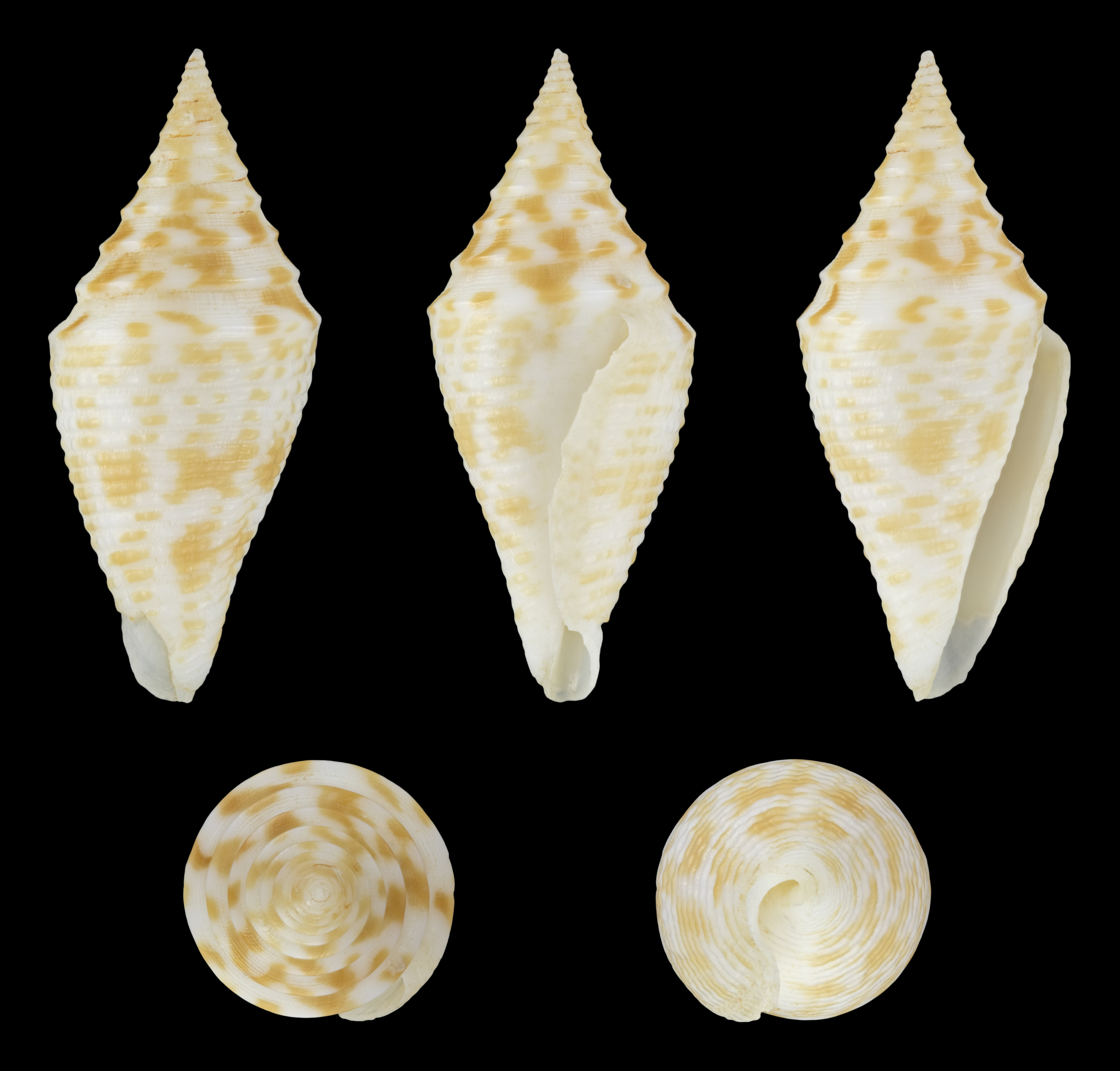
- Five views of a shell of Conus pracellens A. Adams, 1855, measuring 29 mm in height, off Aliguay Island, in the Philippines

Conservation status
- Least Concern (IUCN 3.1)

Scientific classification
- Kingdom: Animalia
- Phylum: Mollusca
- Class: Gastropoda
- Subclass: Caenogastropoda
- Order: Neogastropoda
- Superfamily: Conoidea
- Family: Conidae
- Genus: Conus
- Species: C. praecellens

Binomial name
- Conus praecellens A. Adams, 1855

Synonyms
- Asprella (Asprella) sinensis (Sowerby); Conasprella praecellea (A. Adams) Habe, 1964; Conasprella sowerbii (Reeve) Habe, 1964; Conus (Turriconus) praecellens A. Adams, 1855 · accepted, alternate representation; Conus bicolor G. B. Sowerby I, 1833 (invalid: junior homonym of Conus bicolor G.B. Sowerby I, 1833 [March]; Conus sinensis is a replacement name); Conus sinensis G. B. Sowerby I, 1841 (invalid: junior homonym of Conus sinensis Gmelin, 1791); Conus sowerbii Reeve, 1849; Conus sowerbyi (unjustified emendation for Conus sowerbii, synonym of Conus praecellens); Conus sowerbyi var. subaequalis G. B. Sowerby II, 1870; Hemiconus sowerbii (Reeve, 1849); Kurodaconus praecellens (A. Adams, 1855); Leptoconus praecellens Brazier, 1877; Turriconus praecellens (A. Adams, 1855)

= Conus praecellens =

Species of sea snail

Conus praecellens, common name the admirable cone, is a species of sea snail, a marine gastropod mollusk in the family Conidae, the cone snails and their allies.

Like all species within the genus Conus, these snails are predatory and venomous. They are capable of stinging humans, therefore live ones should be handled carefully or not at all.

== Description ==
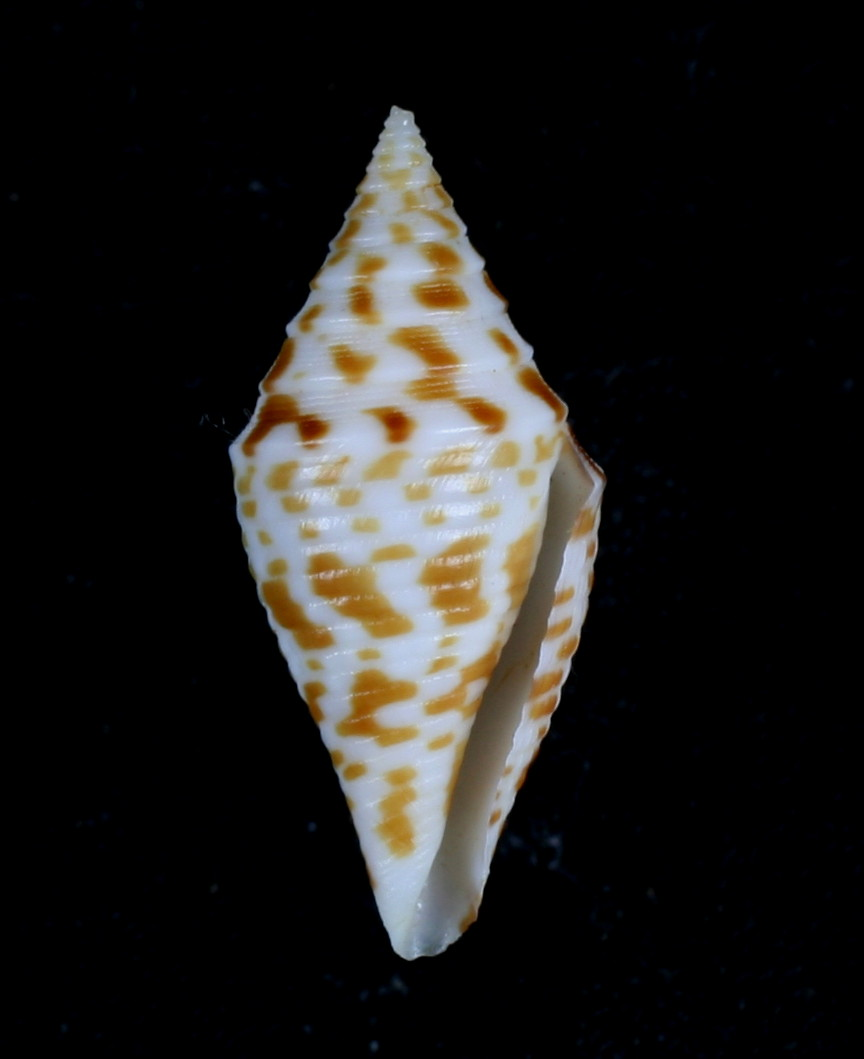
Apertural view of shell of Conus praecellens A. Adams, 1855, measuring 25.5 mm in height, trawled at 80 fms. off Aliguay Island, in the Philippines.

The size of an adult cone varies between 20 mm and 63 mm. The shell is pear-shaped, broad and angulated at the shoulder, contracted towards the base. The body whorl is closely sulcate throughout, the sulci striate The intervening ridges of the rounded spire are carinate, concavely elevated, The acute apex is striate. The color of the shell is whitish, obscurely doubly banded with clouds of light chestnut, and the spire is maculated with the same.

This is a variable species, yet two distinct forms are recognized: (1) sowerbii form, Reeve, 1849 (a thicker, darker, and more densely spotted form with 2 protoconch whorls), and (2) aliguay form, Olivera & Biggs, 2010 (2.5 pearly white smooth protoconch whorls, more slender, higher spire, rounded shoulders, lighter colored). The sowerbii form is the most common form, and until the late 1990s was the only form typically found and in private collections.

== Distribution ==
This marine species has a wide distribution. It occurs in the Indian Ocean off Madagascar, Réunion, Somalia, India, West Thailand and Western Australia; in the Pacific Ocean from Japan to the Philippines and Melanesia (Papua New Guinea, Solomon Islands, New Caledonia, Vanuatu).

== Gallery ==
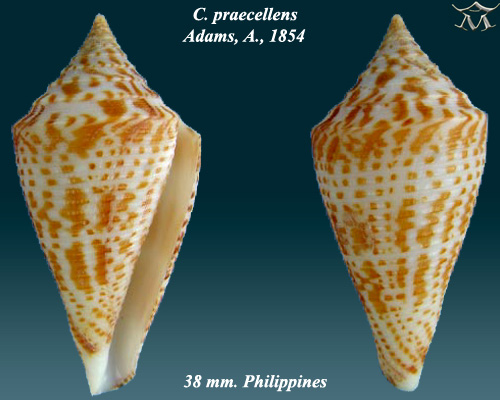
Conus praecellens Adams, A., 1854

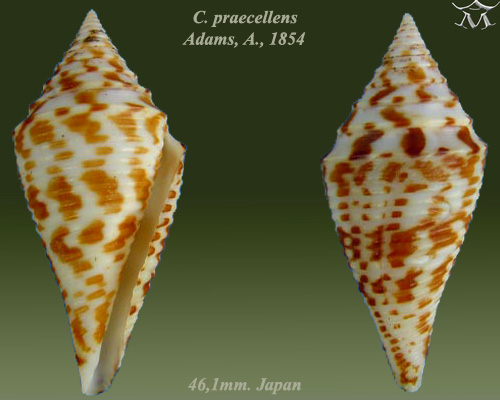
Conus praecellens Adams, A., 1854

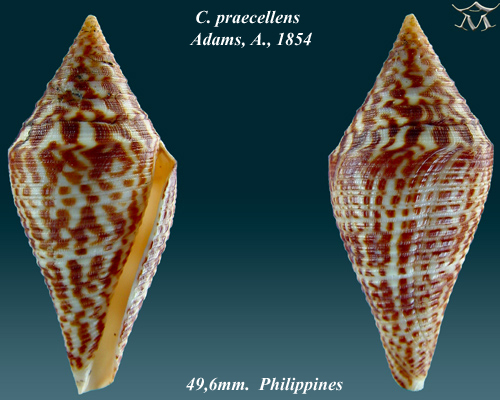
Conus praecellens Adams, A., 1854

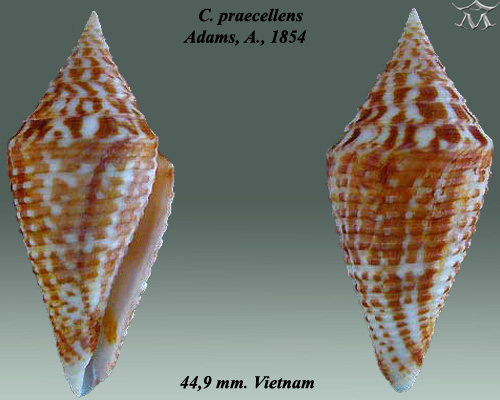
Conus praecellens Adams, A., 1854
