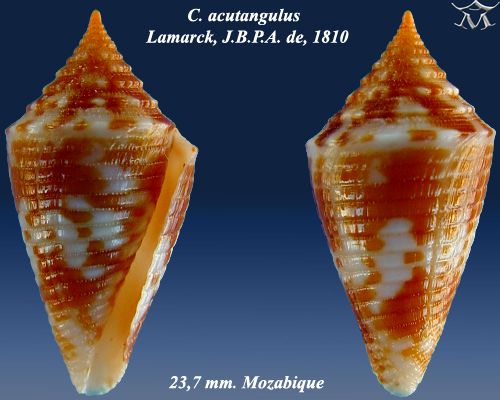
- Apertural and abapertural views of shell of Conus acutangulus Lamarck, J.B.P.A. de, 1810
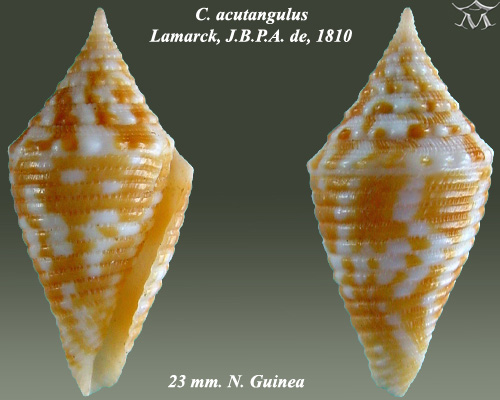

Conservation status
- Least Concern (IUCN 3.1)

Scientific classification
- Kingdom: Animalia
- Phylum: Mollusca
- Class: Gastropoda
- Subclass: Caenogastropoda
- Order: Neogastropoda
- Superfamily: Conoidea
- Family: Conidae
- Genus: Conus
- Species: C. acutangulus

Binomial name
- Conus acutangulus Lamarck, 1810

Synonyms
- Conus gemmulatus G.B. Sowerby II, 1870; Conus turriculatus G.B. Sowerby II, 1866; Conus wilmeri G. B. Sowerby III, 1882; Conus (Turriconus) acutangulus Lamarck, 1810 · accepted, alternate representation; Turriconus acutangulus (Lamarck, 1810)

= Conus acutangulus =

Species of sea snail

Conus acutangulus, common name the sharp-angled cone, is a species of sea snail, a marine gastropod mollusk in the family Conidae, the cone snails and their allies.

Like all species within the genus Conus, these snails are predatory and venomous. They are capable of stinging humans, therefore live ones should be handled carefully or not at all.

== Description ==
The size of the shell varies between 13 mm and 46 mm.

== Distribution ==
This species occurs in the Red Sea and in the tropical Indo-West Pacific; off Queensland, Australia.
