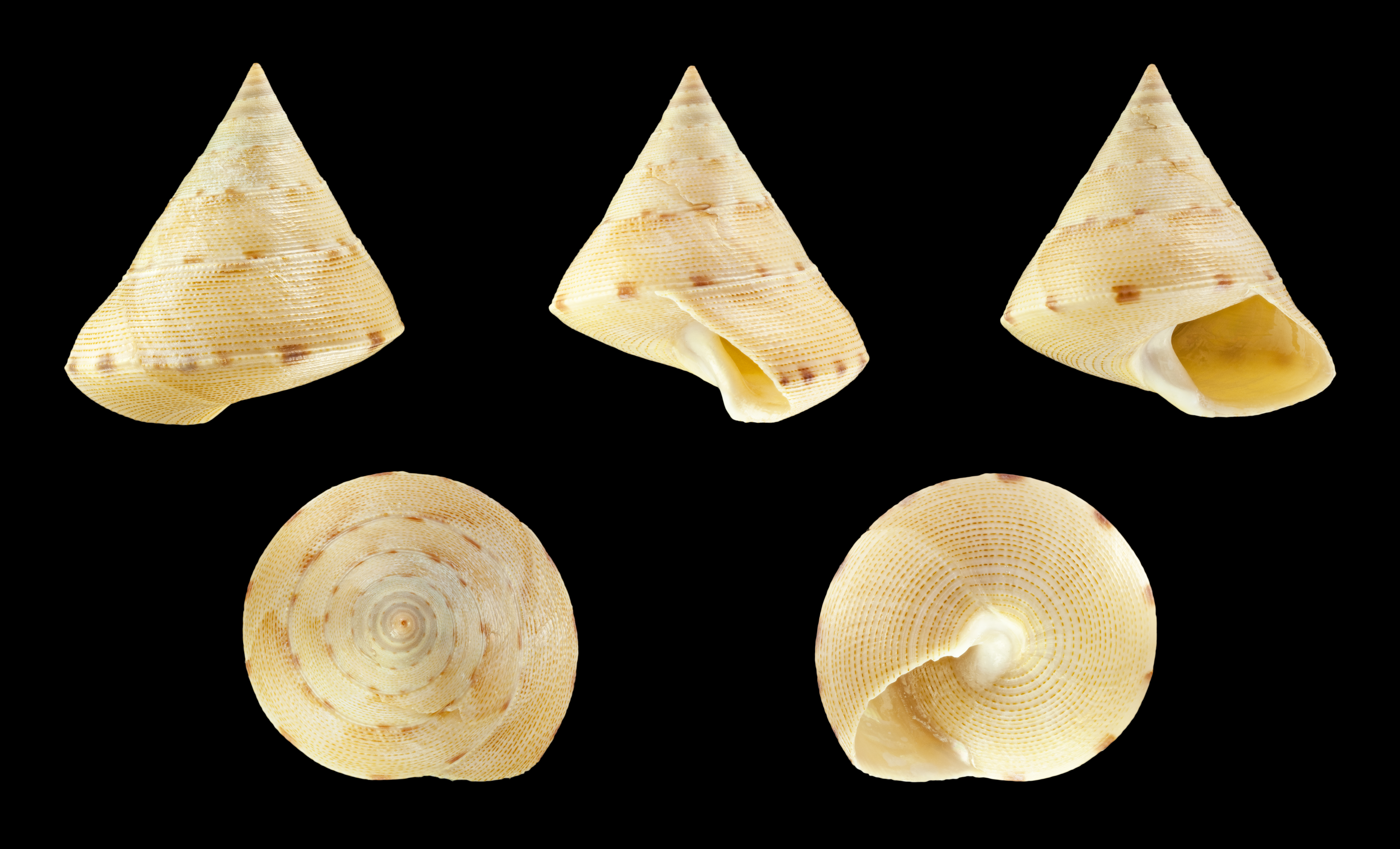

Scientific classification
- Kingdom: Animalia
- Phylum: Mollusca
- Class: Gastropoda
- Subclass: Vetigastropoda
- Order: Trochida
- Superfamily: Trochoidea
- Family: Calliostomatidae
- Subfamily: Calliostomatinae
- Genus: Akoya
- Species: A. haliarchus

Binomial name
- Akoya haliarchus (Melvill, 1889)

Synonyms
- Calliostoma haliarchus (Melvill, 1889); Calliostoma sowerbyi Pilsbry, 1889; Tristichotrochus haliarchus (Melvill, 1889) superseded combination; Ziziphinus haliarchus Melvill, 1889; Ziziphinus jucundus Sowerby, 1878 (non Trochus jucundus Gould, 1849)

= Akoya haliarchus =

Species of gastropod

Akoya haliarchus is a species of sea snail, a marine gastropod mollusk, in the family Calliostomatidae within the superfamily Trochoidea, the top snails, turban snails and their allies.

== Description ==
(Original description in Latin as Ziziphinus haliarchus) The shell is erectly conical and pyramidal, with the body whorl sharply angled at its base. The whorls are flat, sloping, and somewhat smooth, featuring small, leveled granules and thin, encircling ridges. Two of these ridges, located near the sutures, are thicker and adorned with larger granules. The shell is yellowish in color, with purplish-brown flame-like markings around the periphery and obscure dotting. The base has somewhat smooth ridges with dotted, jewel-like patterns, is flat and slightly convex. The columella is calloused, and the interior of the aperture is smoothly striated.

== Distribution ==
This marine species occurs off Japan, Korea, China and Papua New Guinea.
