= Katsura Ōyama =

Japanese paleontologist and zoologist

Katsura Ōyama (大山 桂, Ōyama Katsura; October 6, 1917 – December 30, 1995) was a Japanese paleontologist and zoologist, best known for his work on the Tertiary and Recent Mollusca of Japan.

== Early life ==
Ōyama was born on October 6, 1917, the second son of Duke Kashiwa Ōyama, who was the second son of Ōyama Iwao. He graduated from the Department of Zoology, Tokyo Imperial University in 1941, and in the following year took up an assistant position in the Natural Resources Institute (資源化学研究所) of the Interior Ministry.

== Professional career ==
In July 1944, Ōyama moved to the Imperial Navy's Macassar Research Institute in present-day Indonesia, working as a researcher until the Institute's dissolution in May, 1946. Thereafter he returned to Tokyo and resumed his position at the Natural Resources Institute. In 1947, he took up a concurrent position at the Geological Survey of Japan. Ōyama received his PhD in 1955, and almost immediately left for a period of postdoctoral research with Dr. Myra Keen at Stanford University in California that lasted until April 1957. In 1979, Ōyama retired from the Geological Survey and founded a research laboratory at Toba Aquarium in Mie, also housing his vast library of paleontological and malacological literature.

== Publications ==
Ōyama was a prolific author, both independently and in collaboration with others. Between 1959 and 1963, he published a six-part photographic catalog of many Japanese molluscan families, co-authored with Yoshio Takemura. Together with Tadashige Habe and Tokubei Kuroda he was commissioned by the publisher Maruzen to co-author The Seashells of Sagami Bay (1971) on behalf of the Imperial Household. Ōyama's collected papers were republished in two volumes, one to celebrate his 70th birthday in 1987 and one for his 77th in 1994. A memorial volume of reminiscences and photographs appeared in 1996, following his death on December 30, 1995.

== Personal life ==
A lifelong bachelor, Ōyama was fluent in English and French. Like many of his contemporaries, he insisted on his name being cited in English using its Kunrei transliteration "Katura". He was a co-founder (in 1928) of the Malacological Society of Japan, and attended its annual meetings until 1994. He was latterly a frequent guest at the monthly meetings of the Hanshin Shell Club in Nishinomiya, Hyōgo Prefecture, together with other former members of Tetsuaki Kira's post-war Tengu-kai club.

== The Ōyama Library ==
Ōyama built up a massive personal library of books and papers on Paleontology and Malacology that included many major nineteenth-century western works and a substantial body of Russian literature. Following his death this was held in storage at Toba Aquarium for many years, before being transferred to the Osaka Museum of Natural History at Nagai Park in 2013.

== Ancestry ==
Ancestors of Katsura Ōyama

16. Saigō Takamitsu
8. Ōyama Tsunamasa
17. Yotsumoto NN
4. Ōyama Iwao
18. Ōyama Tsunatake
9. Ōyama Kyōko
2. Kashiwa Ōyama
20. Yamakawa Shigehide
10. Yamakawa Shigekata
5. Yamakawa Sutematsu
22. Saigō Kintōshi
11. Saigō En
1. Katsura Ōyama
24. Konoe Tadahiro
12. Konoe Tadafusa
25. Shimazu Kyōko
6. Konoe Atsumaro
26. Shimazu Hisanaga
13. Shimazu Mitsuko
3. Takeko Konoe
28. Maeda Nariyasu
14. Maeda Yoshiyasu
29. Yasuhime
7. Maeda Motoko
30. Sakai Tadayoshi
15. Sakai Uro
