= Calliostoma katoi =

Scientific classification
- Kingdom: Animalia
- Phylum: Mollusca
- Class: Gastropoda
- Subclass: Vetigastropoda
- Order: Trochida
- Family: Calliostomatidae
- Genus: Calliostoma
- Species: C. katoi

Binomial name
- Calliostoma katoi (Sakurai, 1994)

Synonyms
- Calliostoma (Calliostoma) katoi (Sakurai, 1994); Tristichotrochus katoi Sakurai, 1994 (original combination)

Species of gastropod

Calliostoma katoi is a species of sea snail, a marine gastropod mollusk in the family Calliostomatidae. The species was discovered in 1994 by Kinchi Sakurai.

Some authors place this taxon in the subgenus Calliostoma (Tristichotrochus).

== Description ==
The size of the shell varies between 8 mm and 23 mm.

== Distribution ==
This marine species occurs off Japan.
