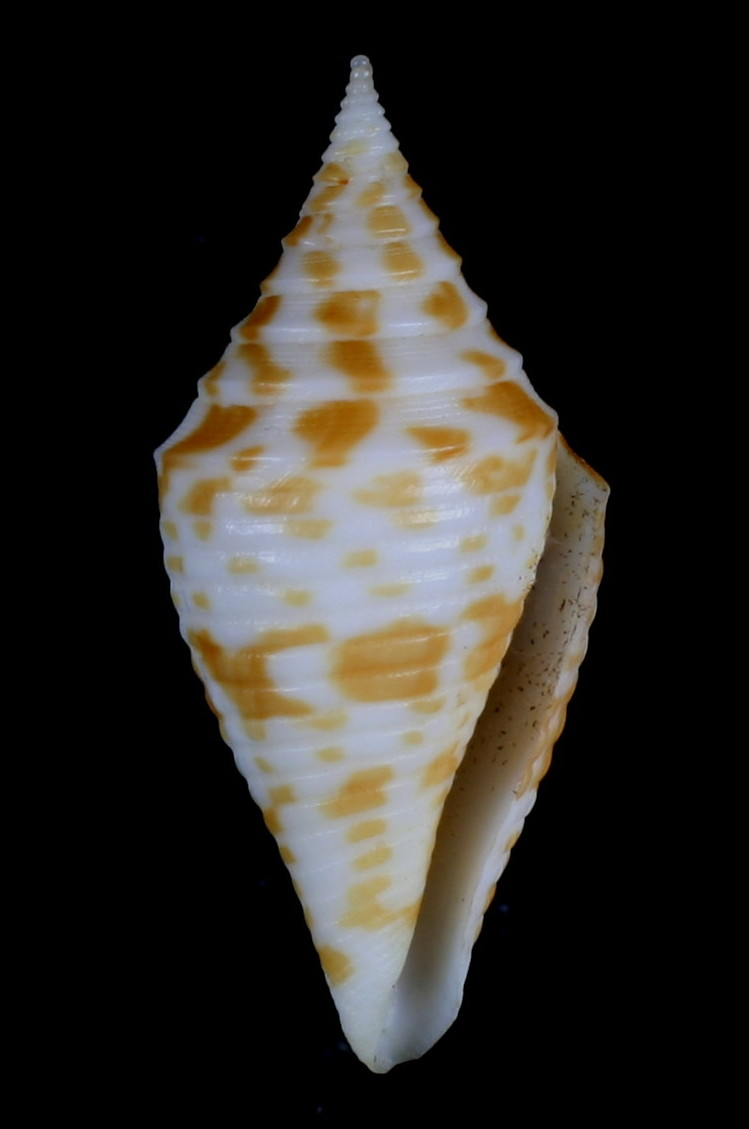
- Apertural view of shell of Conus rizali Olivera & Biggs, 2010, measuring 29.3 mm in height, trawled at 80 fms. off Aliguay Island, in the Philippines

Scientific classification
- Domain: Eukaryota
- Kingdom: Animalia
- Phylum: Mollusca
- Class: Gastropoda
- Subclass: Caenogastropoda
- Order: Neogastropoda
- Superfamily: Conoidea
- Family: Conidae
- Genus: Conus
- Species: C. rizali

Binomial name
- Conus rizali Olivera & Biggs, 2010

Synonyms
- Conus (Turriconus) rizali Olivera & Biggs, 2010 · accepted, alternate representation; Kurodaconus rizali (Olivera & Biggs, 2010); Turriconus rizali (Olivera & Biggs, 2010)

= Conus rizali =

Species of sea snail

Conus rizali is a species of sea snail, a marine gastropod mollusc in the family Conidae, the cone snails and their allies.

Like all species within the genus Conus, these snails are predatory and venomous. They are capable of stinging humans, therefore live ones should be handled carefully or not at all.

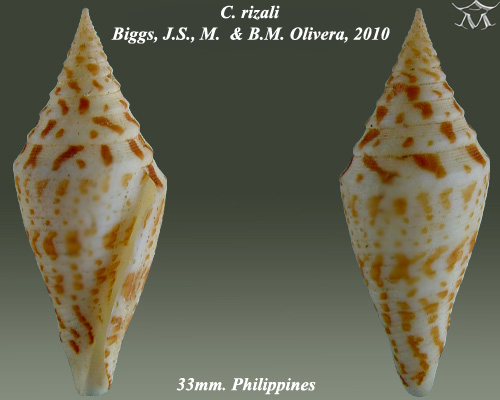
Conus rizali Biggs, J.S., M. & B.M. Olivera, 2010

== Description ==
The size of the shell varies between 25 mm and 40 mm.

== Distribution ==
This marine species is endemic to the Philippines.
