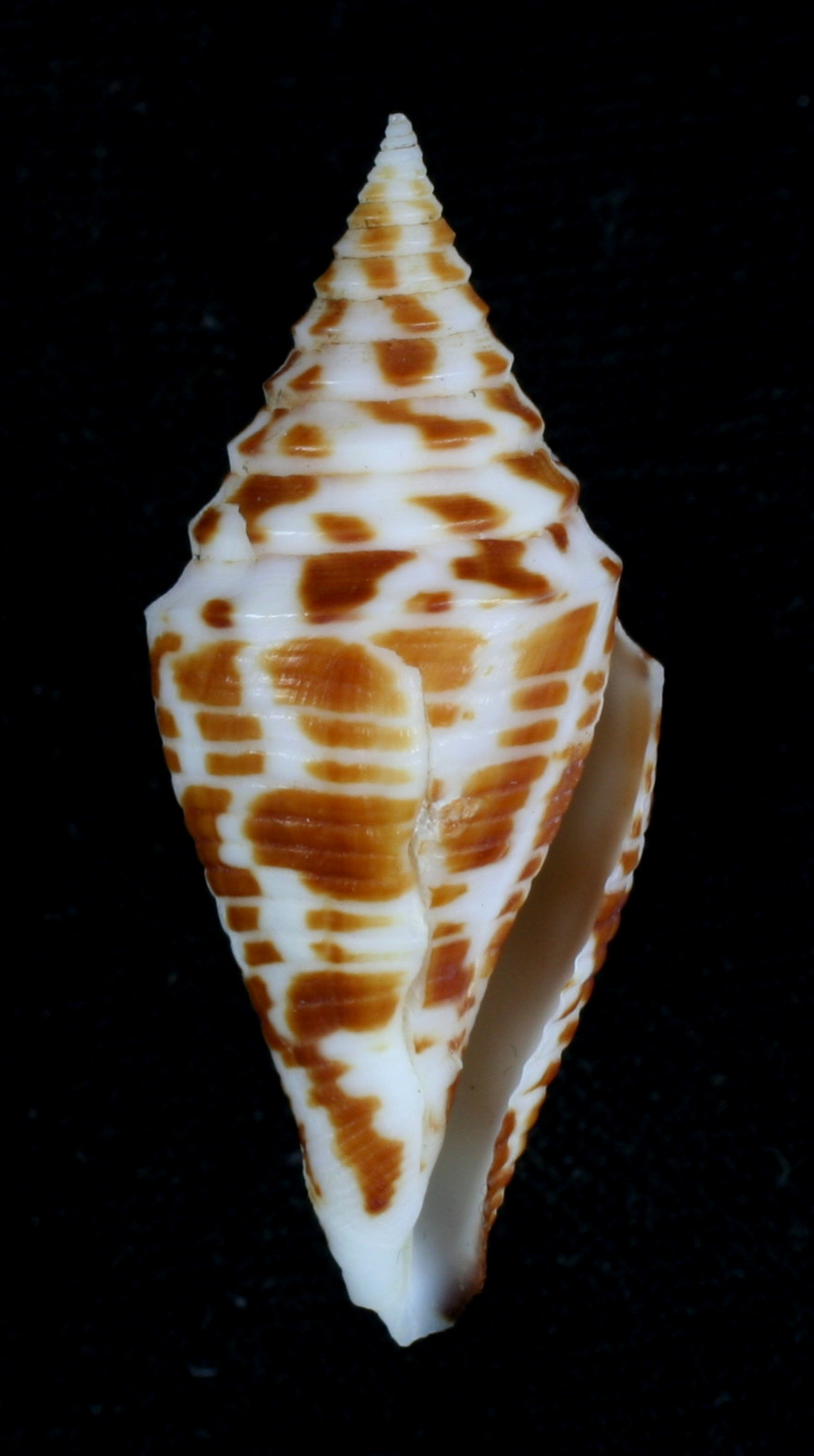
- Apertural view of shell of Conus andremenezi Olivera & Biggs, 2010, measuring 37.6 mm in height, trawled at 80 fms. off Aliguay Island, in the Philippines

Conservation status
- Least Concern (IUCN 3.1)

Scientific classification
- Kingdom: Animalia
- Phylum: Mollusca
- Class: Gastropoda
- Subclass: Caenogastropoda
- Order: Neogastropoda
- Superfamily: Conoidea
- Family: Conidae
- Genus: Conus
- Species: C. andremenezi

Binomial name
- Conus andremenezi Olivera & Biggs, 2010

Synonyms
- Conus (Turriconus) andremenezi Olivera & Biggs, 2010 (accepted, alternative representation); Kurodaconus andremenezi (Olivera & Biggs, 2010)

= Conus andremenezi =

Species of sea snail

Conus andremenezi is a species of sea snail, a marine gastropod mollusc in the family Conidae, the cone snails and their allies.

Like all species within the genus Conus, these snails are predatory and venomous. They are capable of stinging humans, therefore live ones should be handled carefully or not at all.

== Description ==
The size of the shell varies between 25 mm and 55 mm.

== Distribution ==
This marine species occurs off the Philippines and New Caledonia.
