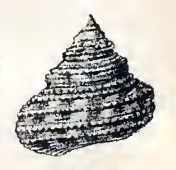
- Drawing of a shell of Tristichotrochus multiliratus

Scientific classification
- Kingdom: Animalia
- Phylum: Mollusca
- Class: Gastropoda
- Subclass: Vetigastropoda
- Order: Trochida
- Family: Calliostomatidae
- Genus: Tristichotrochus
- Species: T. multiliratus

Binomial name
- Tristichotrochus multiliratus (G. B. Sowerby III, 1875)

Synonyms
- Calliostoma ishianum Yokoyama, 1926; Calliostoma multiliratum (G. B. Sowerby III, 1875); Calliostoma (Tristichotrochus) multiliratum (G. B. Sowerby III, 1875); Ziziphinus multiliratus G. B. Sowerby III, 1875

= Tristichotrochus multiliratus =

Species of gastropod

Tristichotrochus multiliratus is a species of sea snail, a marine gastropod mollusk in the family Calliostomatidae.

== Description ==
The size of the shell varies between 15 mm and 21 mm. The shell has a conical shape. It is imperforate, and thin but solid. Its color is pale yellowish-gray, radiately flamed with reddish. The base of the shell is minutely dotted with reddish on the lirae. The surface of the whorls is encircled by unequal sized granose lirae. The bead-like granules are not compressed, Sometimes the lirae of the upper surface are not perceptibly granose except those near the suture. There are about 7 such lirae on the penultimate whorl, and several minute ones intercalated toward the periphery. On the base there are about 15 lirae of nearly equal size, the inner ones granulose, the outer several nearly or quite smooth. The spire is conical. The apex is acute with the apical whorl smooth. The earlier whorls contain each 3 strong smooth carinae. The sutures are impressed. The seven whorls are convex, the last one rounded and obscurely biangulate at the periphery. The rounded aperture is broader than high, and iridescent inside. The arcuate columella is a little excavated in the umbilical region.

== Distribution ==
This marine species occurs off the Philippines, China and Japan.
