= Calliostoma crossleyae =

Scientific classification
- Kingdom: Animalia
- Phylum: Mollusca
- Class: Gastropoda
- Subclass: Vetigastropoda
- Order: Trochida
- Family: Calliostomatidae
- Genus: Calliostoma
- Species: C. crossleyae

Binomial name
- Calliostoma crossleyae E. A. Smith, 1910

Species of gastropod

Calliostoma crossleyae is a species of sea snail, a marine gastropod mollusk in the family Calliostomatidae. The height of the shell attains 9 mm. This marine species occurs off Transkei, South KwaZuluNatal, South Africa
