= Calliostoma amamiense =

Scientific classification
- Kingdom: Animalia
- Phylum: Mollusca
- Class: Gastropoda
- Subclass: Vetigastropoda
- Order: Trochida
- Family: Calliostomatidae
- Genus: Calliostoma
- Species: C. amamiense

Binomial name
- Calliostoma amamiense (Sakurai, 1994)

Synonyms
- Calliostoma (Calliostoma) amamiensis (Sakurai, K.I., 1994); Tristichotrochus amamiensis Sakurai, 1994

Species of gastropod

Calliostoma amamiense is a species of sea snail, a marine gastropod mollusk in the family Calliostomatidae.

Some authors place this taxon in the subgenus Calliostoma (Tristichotrochus)

== Distribution ==
This marine species occurs off Japan.
