= Calliostoma mikikoae =

Scientific classification
- Kingdom: Animalia
- Phylum: Mollusca
- Class: Gastropoda
- Subclass: Vetigastropoda
- Order: Trochida
- Family: Calliostomatidae
- Genus: Calliostoma
- Species: C. mikikoae

Binomial name
- Calliostoma mikikoae (Kosuge & Oh-Ishi, 1970)

Synonyms
- Calliostoma (Calliostoma) mikikoae (Kosuge & Oh-Ishi, 1970); Tristichotrochus mikikoae Kosuge & Oh-Ishi, 1970

Species of gastropod

Calliostoma mikikoae is a species of sea snail, a marine gastropod mollusk in the family Calliostomatidae.

Some authors place this taxon in the subgenus Calliostoma (Tristichotrochus).

== Distribution ==
This species occurs in the China Sea.
