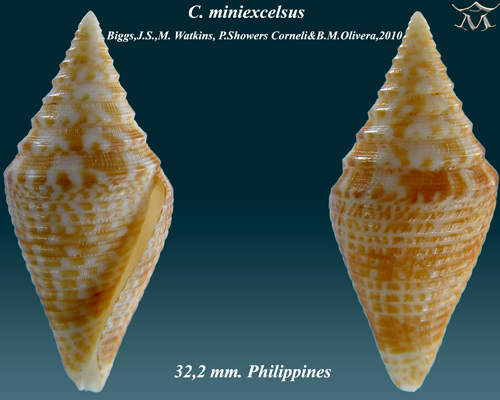
- Apertural and abapertural views of shellof Conus miniexcelsus (Biggs, J.S., M. Watkins, P. Showers Corneli & B.M. Olivera, 2010)

Conservation status
- Data Deficient (IUCN 3.1)

Scientific classification
- Kingdom: Animalia
- Phylum: Mollusca
- Class: Gastropoda
- Subclass: Caenogastropoda
- Order: Neogastropoda
- Superfamily: Conoidea
- Family: Conidae
- Genus: Conus
- Species: C. miniexcelsus

Binomial name
- Conus miniexcelsus Olivera & Biggs, 2010

Synonyms
- Conus (Turriconus) miniexcelsus Olivera & Biggs, 2010 · accepted, alternate representation; Kurodaconus miniexcelsus (Olivera & Biggs, 2010); Turriconus (Turriconus) miniexcelsus (Olivera & Biggs, 2010); Turriconus miniexcelsus (Olivera & Biggs, 2010)

= Conus miniexcelsus =

Species of sea snail

Conus miniexcelsus, common name Sulu's cone, is a species of sea snail, a marine gastropod mollusc in the family Conidae, the cone snails and their allies.

Like all species within the genus Conus, these snails are predatory and venomous. They are capable of stinging humans, therefore live ones should be handled carefully or not at all.

== Description ==
The size of the shell varies between 19 mm and 37 mm.

The shell can look like an cone with small splashes of white and orange.

== Distribution ==
This marine species occurs off the Philippines and Japan.
