= Calliostoma takaseanum =

Scientific classification
- Kingdom: Animalia
- Phylum: Mollusca
- Class: Gastropoda
- Subclass: Vetigastropoda
- Order: Trochida
- Family: Calliostomatidae
- Genus: Calliostoma
- Species: C. takaseanum

Binomial name
- Calliostoma takaseanum (Okutani, 1972)

Synonyms
- Calliostoma (Calliostoma) takaseanum Okutani, 1972; Tristichotrochus takaseanus Okutani, 1972

Species of gastropod

Calliostoma takaseanum is a species of sea snail, a marine gastropod mollusk in the family Calliostomatidae.

Some authors place this taxon in the subgenus Calliostoma (Tristichotrochus).

== Distribution ==
This marine species occurs off Japan.
