= Tokubei Kuroda =

Japanese malacologist (1886 - 1987)

Tokubei Kuroda (黒田 徳米, Kuroda Tokubei; October 17, 1886 – May 15, 1987) was a Japanese scientist and academic. He is best known as a pioneering taxonomist and malacologist specializing in Japanese marine and terrestrial Mollusca.

== Early life ==
Kuroda was born at Fukura (now Nandan-cho in Minamiawaji) on the island of Awaji. He graduated middle school at 15, and was recruited as a houseboy by Yoichiro Hirase, a Kyoto dealer in poultry, seeds and aviculture products who had founded a side business trading in marine and land shells. While his employment initially included cleaning Hirase's large house and looking after his children by day, Hirase paid for Kuroda to attend night school and to learn English, at which he excelled, and arranged for him to learn the basics of systematic biology. A rapid learner and diligent clerk, Kuroda was soon placed in charge of the shell business, and became Hirase's secretary. He was instrumental in the founding and operation of Hirase's Conchological Museum (1913-1919), which was situated near Kyoto Zoo, and handled most of Hirase's correspondence with foreign researchers. He also helped compile and edit Hirase's Conchological Magazine (1907-1915). In 1904, Kuroda followed Hirase in adopting Christianity, and through his church met many of the American missionaries who were active at that time in Japanese education, including Marshall Gaines and John Thomas Gulick.

== Mid-career ==
During the period 1899–1918, a large portion of the marine and terrestrial mollusks of Japan were described by researchers in the United States and Europe, based on material sent overseas by Hirase via Kuroda. Chief among the specialists in Japanese mollusks at the time were Henry Augustus Pilsbry of the Academy of Natural Sciences in Philadelphia, and William Healey Dall of the Smithsonian Institution, who between them described more than a thousand marine and terrestrial species from Japan.

Upon Hirase's death in 1925, Kuroda spent two years dividing up his master's vast shell collection. One third was donated to the Smithsonian, and another third to the Natural Resources Research Institute in Tokyo. Kuroda was then hired as a curatorial assistant in the Geology Department of Kyoto University. Except for a brief stay at Taipei Imperial University from 1937 to 1940, he remained associated with Kyoto University throughout the remainder of his career, earning his PhD in 1947 at the age of 61. Kuroda was instrumental in founding the Malacological Society of Japan (1928) and its journal the Venus. During World War II, he carried out field collecting work in Taiwan and the Philippines, building on his experience in earlier expeditions to Korea and Tsushima.

== Post-war activities ==
Though he had formally retired by 1945, Kuroda's government pension of 100 yen per month was rendered worthless with the revaluation of the Japanese currency by the Allied administration. Together with Tadashige Habe, however, he was hired as a consultant by Dr. Alvin Cahn of the Natural Resources Division at SCAP in Tokyo. Cahn drew on Kuroda's knowledge and command of English to help him compile reports on the Japanese pearl industry and other aspects of mariculture, and in return paid Kuroda a stipend and arranged for him to receive travel grants and some basic support for his research. In 1952, Kuroda and Habe published their Checklist of the Marine Mollusca of Japan through Colonel Leo Stach of SCAP.

Kuroda retired from SCAP in 1951, and became an emeritus researcher at Kyoto University. From 1966, his home was a suite of rooms at the Kaisei Hospital at Koroen in Nishinomiya City, under the care of the hospital's director Dr. Norio Kikuchi. Kuroda attended regular meetings of the Hanshin Shell Club and the Malacological Society of Japan into his late 90s, and died a few months short of his 101st birthday.

== Relationship with the Showa Emperor ==
Kuroda first met the Showa Emperor (Hirohito) at a soiree shortly before the opening of the Hirase Conchological Museum in 1912, while the latter was still Crown Prince. Hirohito's lifelong interest in marine invertebrates is thought to have originated with the commemorative collection of shells he received at this event. In 1971, Kuroda, Habe and Katsura Ōyama were selected to co-author a monograph of the Sea Shells of Sagami Bay, published by Maruzen in Tokyo under the auspices of the Imperial Household Biological Laboratory.

== Collected works ==
The Japanese malacological literature has mirrored its German counterpart with commemorative articles and festschrifts published on the key birthdays of well-known malacologists. Germany scientific community typically commemorates the 60th, 70th, 80th, and even 90th birthdays. Kuroda's colleagues recognized him upon his 60th, 77th, 88th, 99th, and 100th birthdays.

Between 1907 and 1984 Kuroda published a vast body of original research, mainly in the journals Venus and 'Yume-Hamaguri'. A full bibliography of his works, listing all his new taxa, was published by the Hanshin Shell Club in 1986. An illustrated catalog of the type specimens in his collection at the Kikuchi Shell Museum (now transferred to the Nishinomiya Shell Museum) appeared in 1996, with a supplement listing his other types published in 1997.

A biography in Japanese entitled "Kai ni madowasareta issho" (A life entranced by shells) was published by Kaoru Higashi of Nishinomiya in 1987.

== Shell collection ==
Kuroda's own shell collection is housed in the Nishinomiya Shell Museum in Hyogo Prefecture, Japan, including many of his type specimens. The Imperial collection, on which the 1971 work "The Seashells of Sagami Bay" was based, is housed in the Showa Memorial Institute of the National Museum of Nature and Science in Tsukuba.

== Honors ==
- Order of the Sacred Treasure, 1939.

== Selected works ==
=== Articles ===
- Kuroda, Tokubei, 1937. "A. Adams’ colour blindness." Venus 7(4): 178 [in Japanese].
- Kuroda, Tokubei and Tadashige Habe, 1954. "On some Japanese Mollusca described by A. Adams, whose specimens are deposited in the Redpath Museum of Canada" (No. 1). Venus 18(1): 1-16, pls. 1, 2.
- P. Callomon, 2003. Henry A. Pilsbry and Yoichiro Hirase, with translation of Tokubei Kuroda’s (1958) "In memory of Dr. H. A. Pilsbry: Pilsbry and the Mollusca of Japan." Proceedings of the Academy of Natural Sciences of Philadelphia 153: 1-6
- Kuroda, Tokubei and Tadashige Habe, 1958. "On some Japanese Mollusca described by A. Adams, whose specimens are deposited in the Redpath Museum of Canada. Venus 18(1): 1-16, pls. 1-2.
- Kuroda, Tokubei, translated and with an introduction by P. Callomon, 2003. "Yoichiro Hirase, the great collector of Japanese land mollusks, and the collectors who helped him." Proceedings of the Academy of Natural Sciences of Philadelphia 153:7-14.

=== Books ===
- Kuroda, Tokubei and Tadashige Habe. (1952). Check list and bibliography of the recent marine Mollusca of Japan (edited, Leo. W. Stach). Tokyo: Hosokawa. OCLC 1561570
- Tokubei Kuroda; Tadashige Habe and Katsura Oyama. (1971). The sea shells of Sagami Bay. Tokyo : Maruzen. OCLC 13154754
- Higashi, K. (1987). Kai ni madowasareta issho. Kuroda Tokubei monogatari (A life entranced by shells - the Tokubei Kuroda story) 272 pp. Nishinomiya, Tokubei-Kuroda-monogatari-kai. No ISBN.
- Hanshin Shell Club (1986). Bibliography of Dr. Tokubei Kuroda (for commemoration of his 99th birthday). 103 pp, 33 pls. Nishinomiya, Hanshin Shell Club.
- Habe, T. & Inaba, A. (Eds.)(1996). Catalogue of the shellfish type specimens described by the late Dr. Tokubei Kuroda, in the possession of Nishinomiya City. 152 pp, 44 pls. Nishinomiya City, Hyogo.
- Habe, T. & Inaba, A. (Eds.)(1997). Catalogue of the shellfish type specimens described by the late Dr. Tokubei Kuroda, except the possession of Nishinomiya City. 61 pp. Nishinomiya City, Hyogo.
