= Tadashige Habe =

Japanese malacologist (1916–2001)

- Born: March 21, 1916; Hioki Village, Hyōgo Prefecture, Japan
- Died: December 29, 2001 (aged 85); Kawasaki, Kanagawa, Japan
- Known for: Honorary President of the Malacological Society of Japan; Major contributions to Japanese malacology
- Awards: Order of the Sacred Treasure, 3rd Class
- Scientific career
- Fields: Zoology, Malacology
- Institutions: Kyoto University, Kyushu University, Tokai University, National Museum of Nature and Science

Tadashige Habe (Japanese: 波部 忠重, March 21, 1916 – December 29, 2001) was a Japanese malacologist and zoologist. He served as honorary president of the Malacological Society of Japan and honorary member of the Zoological Society of Japan. Habe was a leading figure in Japanese malacology during the latter half of the 20th century, describing over 1,600 taxa (families, genera, and species). He was also known for his mentorship of both professional and amateur researchers. Together with Tokubei Kuroda and Katsura Oyama, he co-authored Shells of Sagami Bay (1971), based on specimens collected by Emperor Shōwa.

== Biography ==
Habe was born on March 21, 1916, in Hioki Village (now Tamba-Sasayama), Hyōgo Prefecture, Japan. While studying at Ikeda Normal School in Osaka Prefecture (1934–1936), he became fascinated by shells after collecting them on the beaches of Tokunoshima, which inspired his lifelong study of mollusks.

After graduating in 1936, he worked as an elementary school teacher in Sakai, Osaka. In 1939, he entered the Department of Zoology at Kyoto Imperial University, where he studied under the prominent malacologist Tokubei Kuroda. He was appointed assistant at Kyoto University in 1949 and earned his Doctor of Science degree in 1957 with a thesis titled “Study on the Shell Remains of Inner Bays”. That same year, he became an associate professor at the Amakusa Marine Biological Laboratory of Kyushu University.

In 1952, Habe and Kuroda published Check list and bibliography of the recent marine mollusca of Japan, edited by Leo W. Stach. This work, known simply as “the Checklist,” organized information on Japanese marine mollusks and was prepared under the direction of the Supreme Commander for the Allied Powers (SCAP) Natural Resources Section.

In 1961, he published Illustrated Catalogue of Japanese Shells, Continued (Zoku Genshoku Nihon Kairui Zukan) through Hoikusha. The book became widely known as “Habe’s Illustrated Catalogue,” serving as a standard reference alongside Tetsuaki Kira’s Illustrated Catalogue of Japanese Shells. Both volumes were later translated into English as Shells of the Western Pacific in Colour, Vol. I and II and became key references for Pacific malacology.

In 1962, Habe joined the National Museum of Nature and Science in Tokyo, where he remained until his retirement in 1980. Afterward, he served as professor at Tokai University and later as director of the Tokai University Natural History Museum. In 1986, he was awarded the Order of the Sacred Treasure, 3rd Class.

Habe served as president of the Malacological Society of Japan for sixteen years (1979–1995) and was named honorary president in 1996. He died from a cerebral hemorrhage on December 29, 2001, at the age of 85, at St. Marianna University Hospital, Kawasaki.

== Major works ==
Several of Habe’s works have been digitized and are available via the National Diet Library Digital Collections.

- Synopsis of the Japanese Marine Mollusca, Vols. 1–3 (1951–1952, Malacological Literature Publishing Society)
- Vol. 1 doi:10.11501/1370737 / Vol. 2 doi:10.11501/1370738 / Vol. 3 doi:10.11501/1370739
- Mollusks and Their Lives (1954, Koseisha-Koseikaku) doi:10.11501/1629865
- Study of Snails (1958, Koseisha-Koseikaku) doi:10.11501/1629894
- Illustrated Catalogue of Japanese Shells, Continued (1961, Hoikusha) doi:10.11501/1378730
- World Shells in Colour: North Pacific Edition (1965, Hoikusha) with Kiyoshi Ito doi:10.11501/1370735
- World Shells in Colour: Tropical Pacific Edition (1966, Hoikusha) with Sadao Kosuge doi:10.11501/1370736
- Japanese Shells (Hoikusha Color Books, Vol. 157), 1968
- Shells of Sagami Bay (1971, Maruzen) with Tokubei Kuroda and Katsura Oyama
- The Natural History of Shells (1975, Hoikusha)
- Bivalvia and Scaphopoda: Taxonomy of Japanese Mollusca (1977, Hokuryukan) doi:10.11501/12637512
- Introduction to Malacology (2 vols., 1994–1999, Scientist Company), coauthored with Saburō Nishiwaki and Takashi Okutani

== See also ==
- Tokubei Kuroda, colleague and mentor at Kyoto University.
