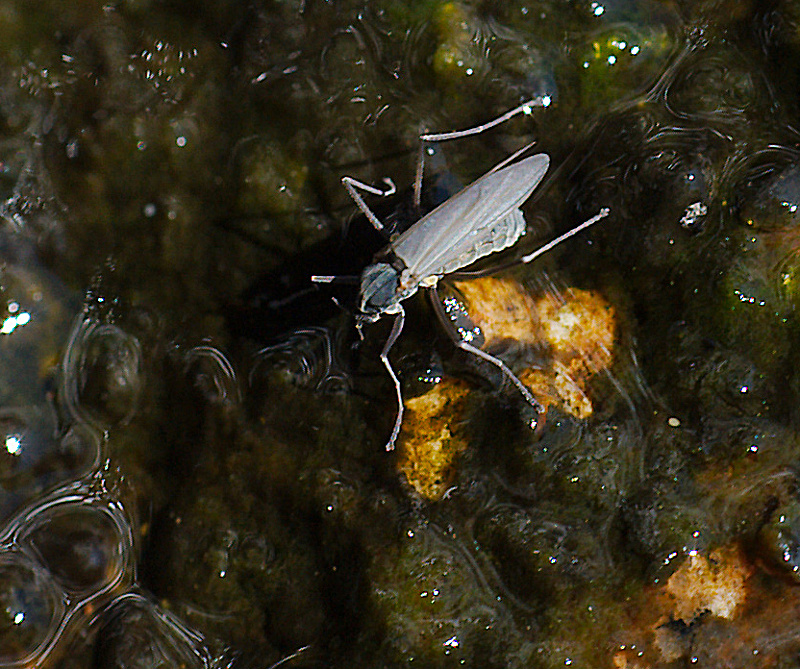
- Telmatogeton japonicus

Scientific classification
- Kingdom: Animalia
- Phylum: Arthropoda
- Clade: Pancrustacea
- Class: Insecta
- Order: Diptera
- Family: Chironomidae
- Subfamily: Telmatogetoninae

Genera
- See text

= Telmatogetoninae =

Subfamily of midges

Telmatogetoninae is a subfamily of midges in the non-biting midge family (Chironomidae).

== Genera and species ==
- Genus Telmatogeton Schiner, 1866

- T. abnormis (Terry, 1913)
- T. alaskensis Coquillett, 1900
- T. atlanticum Oliveira, 1950
- T. australicus Womersley, 1936
- T. fluviatilis Wirth, 1947
- T. hirtus Wirth, 1947
- T. japonicus Tokunaga, 1933
- T. latipennis Wirth, 1949
- T. macswaini Wirth, 1949
- T. minor Kieffer, 1914
- T. namum Oliveira, 1950
- T. pacificus Tokunaga, 1935
- T. pectinatus (Deby, 1889)
- T. pusillum Edwards, 1933
- T. sanctipauli Schiner, 1866
- T. torrenticola (Terry, 1913)
- T. trilobatus (Kieffer, 1911)
- T. trochanteratum Edwards, 1931
- T. williamsi Wirth, 1947

- Genus Thalassomya Schiner, 1856

- T. africana Edwards, 1926
- T. bureni Wirth, 1949
- T. frauenfeldi Schiner, 1856
- T. japonica Tokunaga & Komyo, 1996
- T. longipes Johnson, 1924
- T. maritima Wirth, 1947
- T. pilipes Edwards, 1928
- T. sabroskyi Tokunaga, 1964
- T. setosipennis Wirth, 1947
