= T. japonica =

T. japonica may refer to:

- Thalassomya japonica, a midge species in the genus Thalassomya
- Theretra japonica, a moth species found in Japan, China, Korea and Russia
- Tilia japonica, the Japanese lime or shina, a tree species in the genus Tilia
- Torilis japonica, the Japanese hedge parsley, a plant species
- Tylotiella japonica, a sea snail species

== See also ==
- Japonica (disambiguation)
