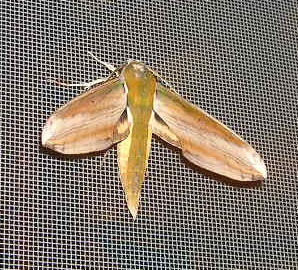

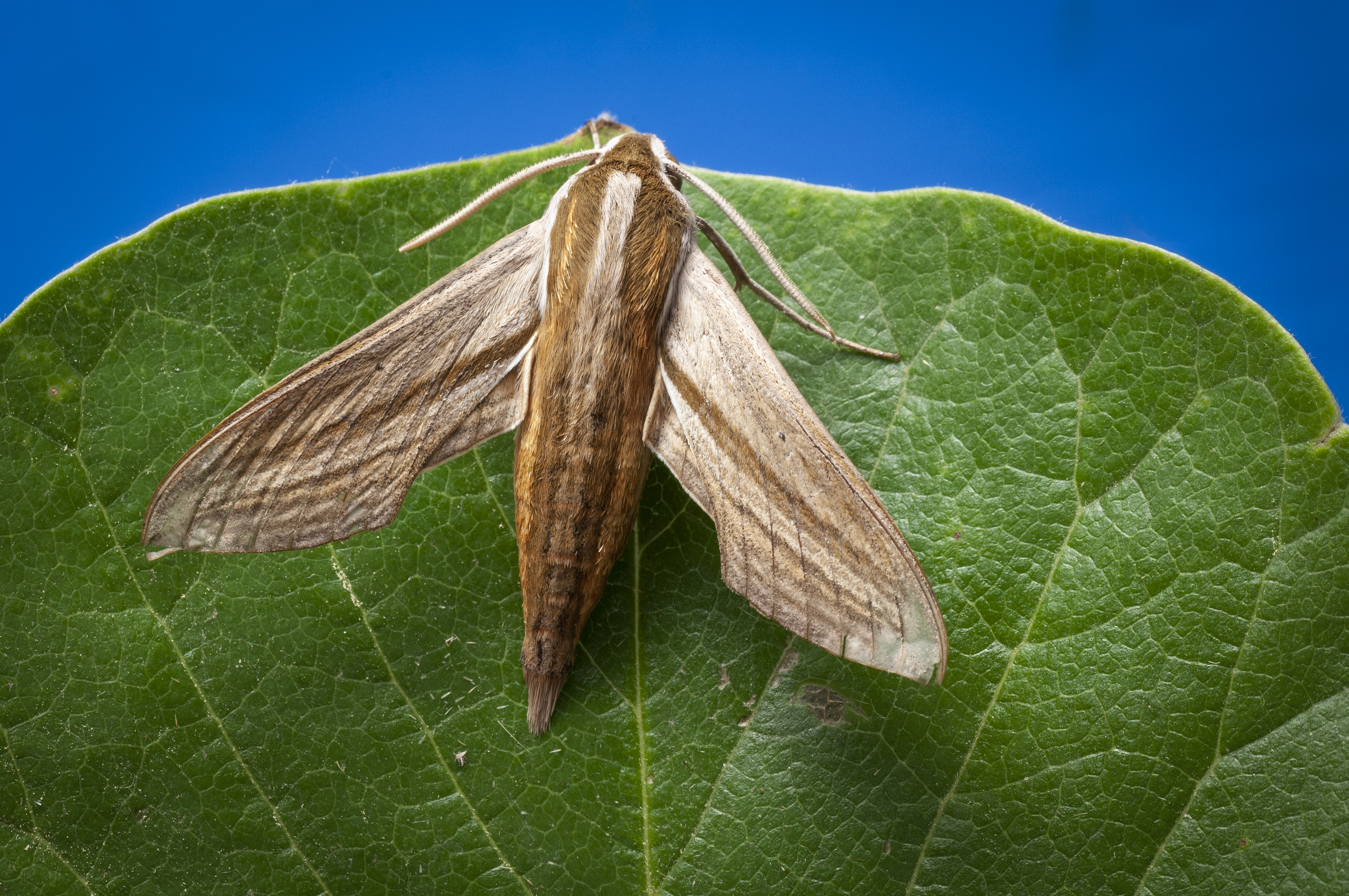
- Theretra japonica (Dorsal), Adult, South Korea

Scientific classification
- Kingdom: Animalia
- Phylum: Arthropoda
- Clade: Pancrustacea
- Class: Insecta
- Order: Lepidoptera
- Family: Sphingidae
- Genus: Theretra
- Species: T. japonica

Binomial name
- Theretra japonica (Boisduval, 1869)

Synonyms
- Choerocampa japonica Boisduval, 1869; Deilephila suifuna Staudinger, 1892; Theretra japonica alticola Mell, 1939

= Theretra japonica =

Species of moth

Theretra japonica is a moth of the family Sphingidae first described by Jean Baptiste Boisduval in 1869.

== Distribution ==
It is found in Japan, China, Korea and Russia.

== Description ==
The wingspan is 55–80 mm.

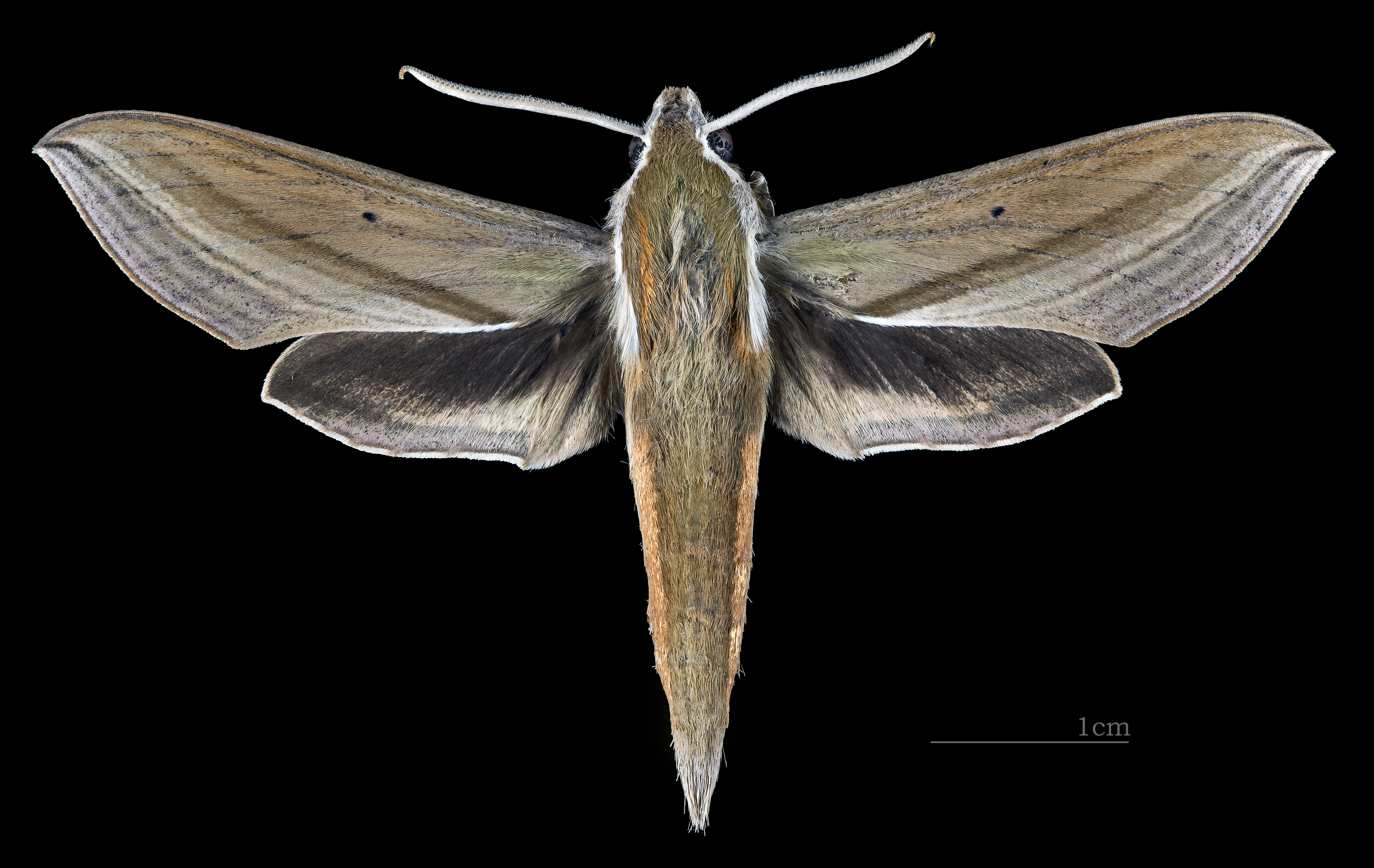
Male, dorsal view

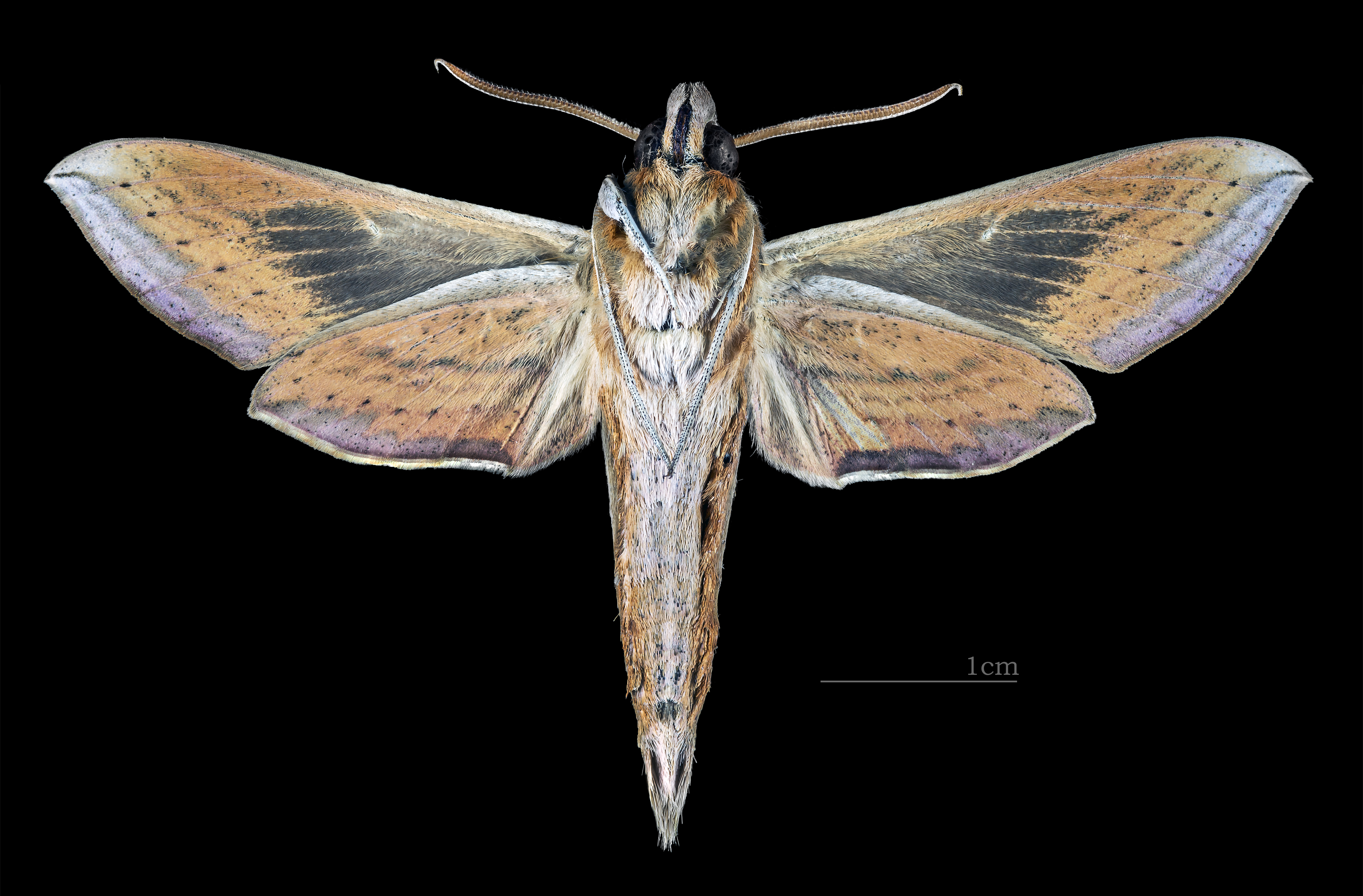
Male, ventral view

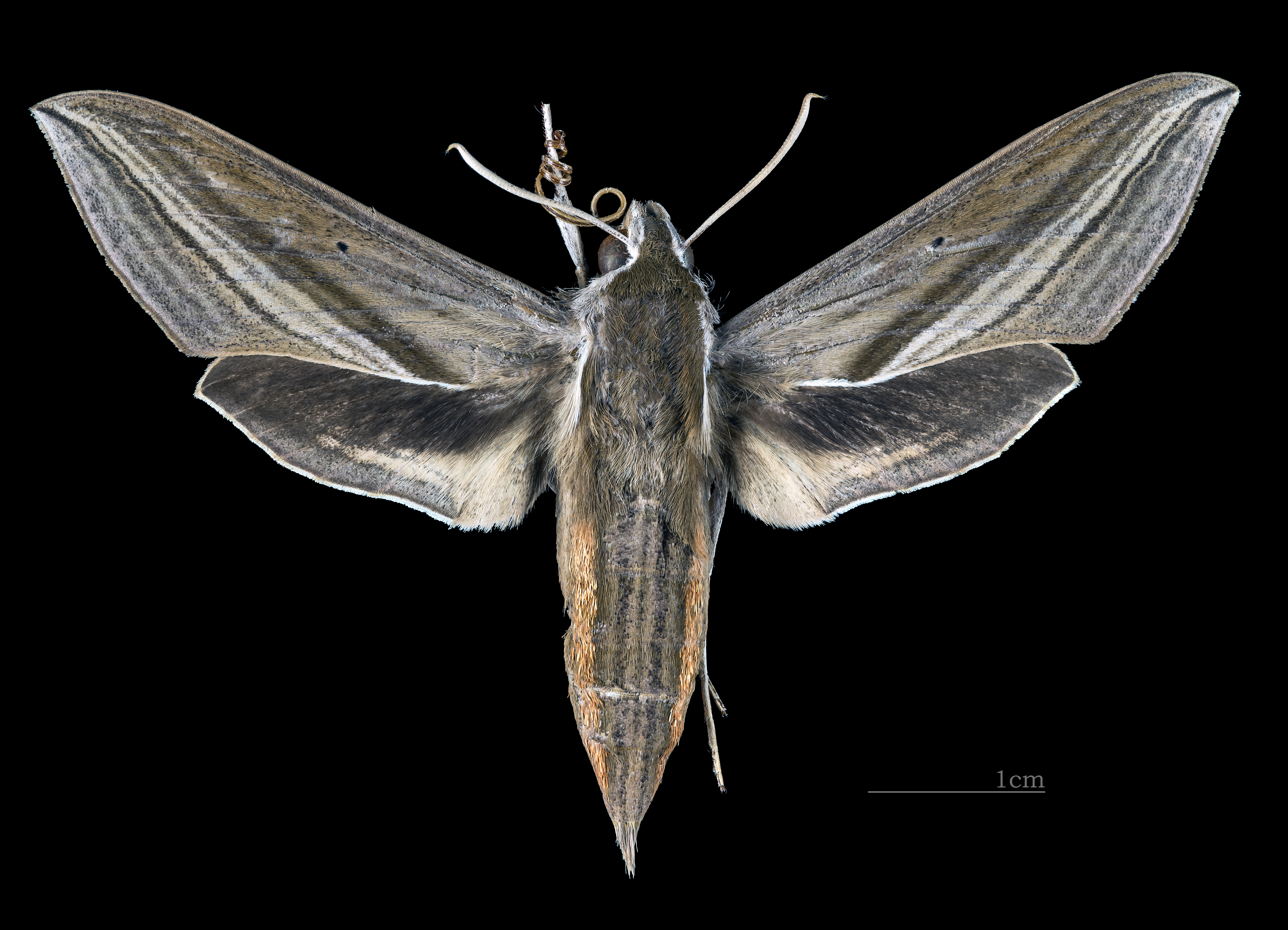
Female, dorsal view

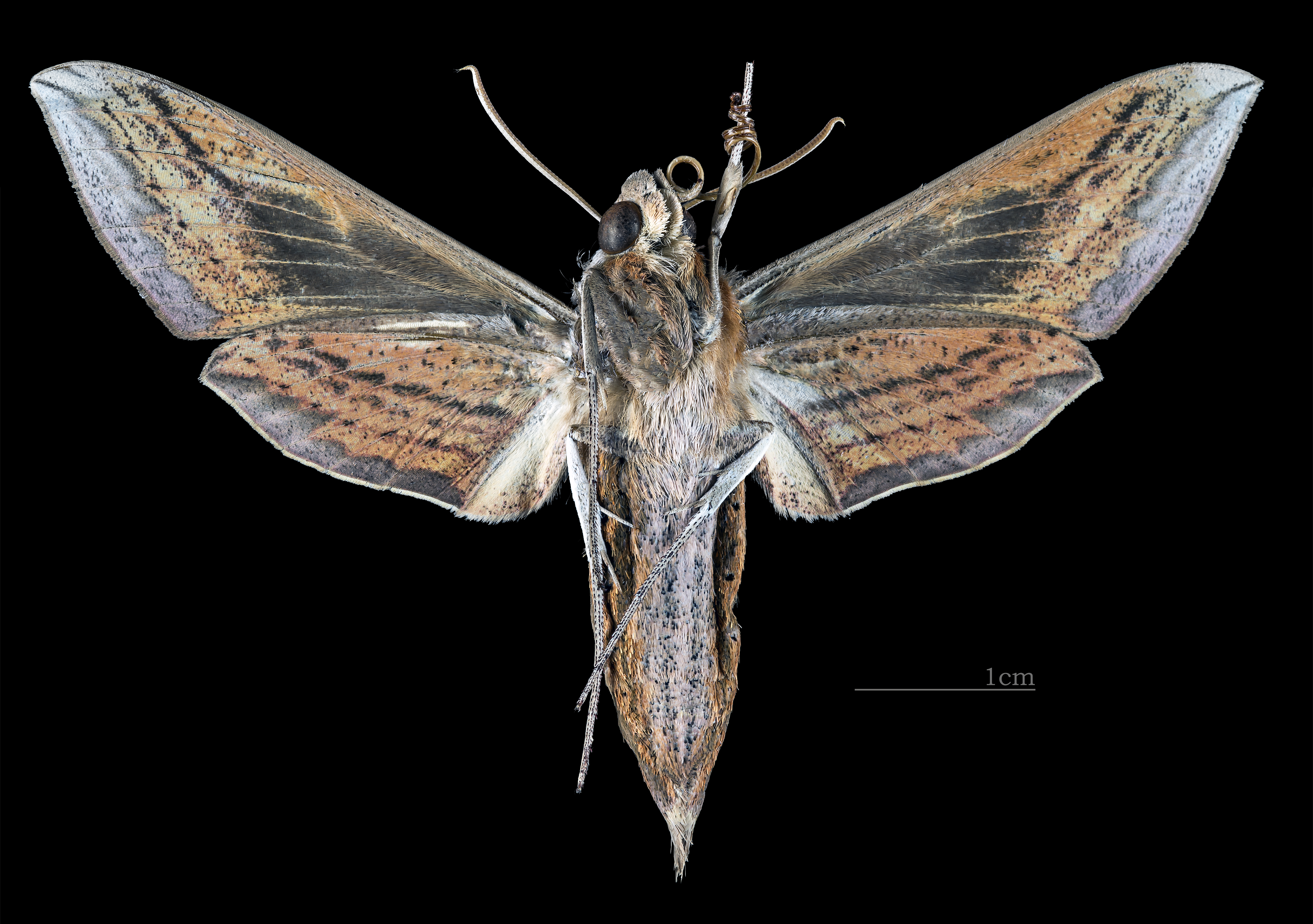
Female, ventral view

== Biology ==
- The moth flies from May to September depending on the location.

The caterpillars feed on a wide range of plants. Recorded food plants are: In China: Cissus, Colocasia, Hydrangea, Parthenocissus, Ampelopsis, Ipomoea batatas, Cayratia japonica, Vitis and Ludwigia. Recorded in Korea on Colocasia antiquorum, Oenothera erythrosepala, Circaea mollis and Hydrangea paniculata. In Japan they feed on Hydrangea paniculata, Ampelopsis glandulosa, Cayratia japonica, Circaea, Fuchsia, Oenothera biennis, Oenothera stricta, Parthenocissus tricuspidata and Vitis. In the Russian Far East they are found on Vitis amurensis.

== Gallery ==
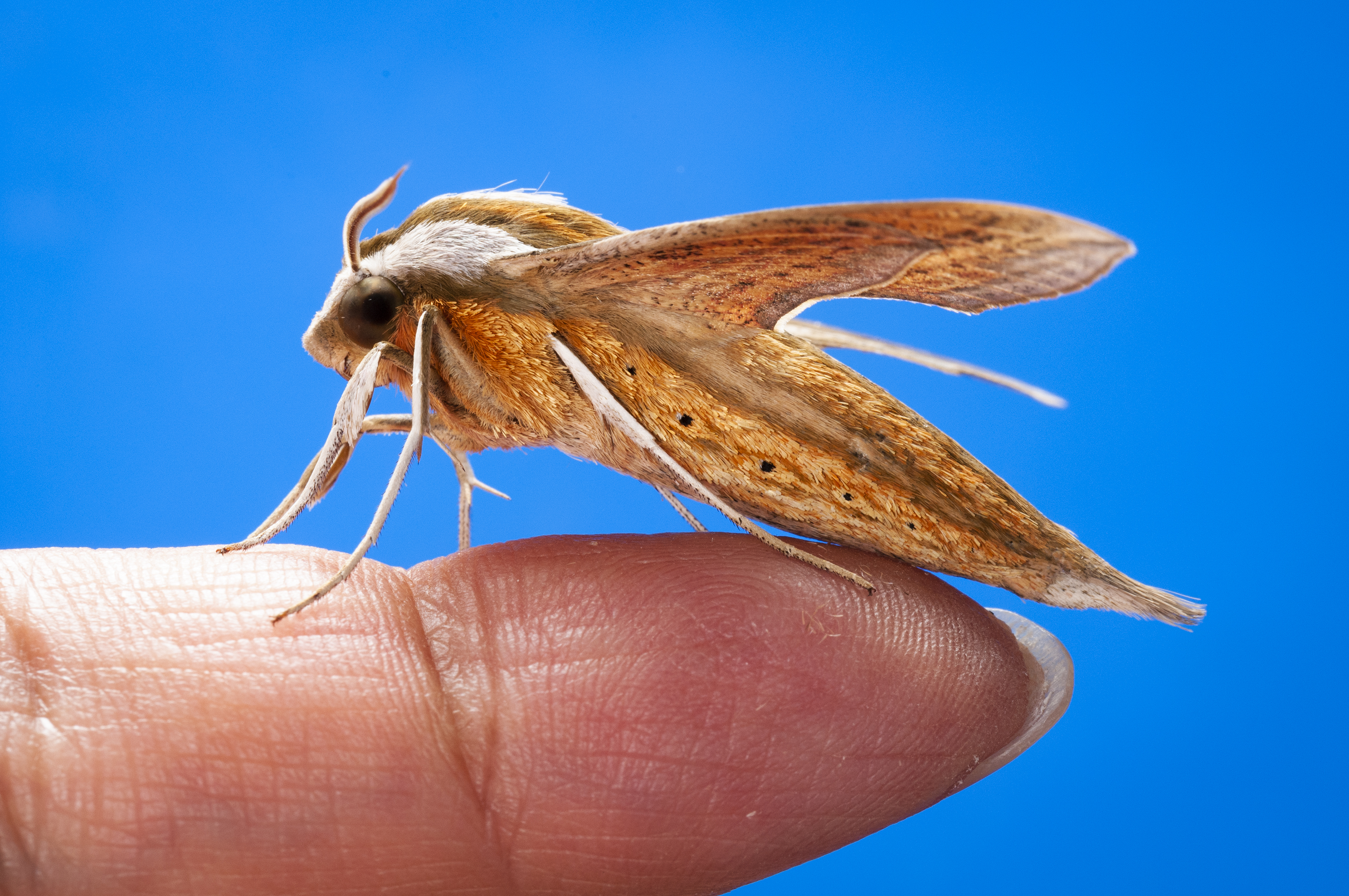
Theretra japonica, Adult, South Korea
