= Circaea × dubia =

Scientific classification
- Kingdom: Plantae
- Clade: Tracheophytes
- Clade: Angiosperms
- Clade: Eudicots
- Clade: Rosids
- Order: Myrtales
- Family: Onagraceae
- Genus: Circaea
- Species: C. × dubia

Binomial name
- Circaea × dubia H.Hara

Hybrid of flowering plant

Circaea × dubia is a hybrid of flowering plants in the evening primrose family Onagraceae. The parents of the hybrid are Circaea cordata and Circaea erubescens.
