= Broad-leaved enchanter's nightshade =

Broad-leaved enchanter's nightshade is a common name for several plants and may refer to:

- Circaea canadensis
- Circaea lutetiana
