= Greville Place nature reserve =

Nature reserve in United Kingdom

Coordinates: 51.535035°N 0.186919°W

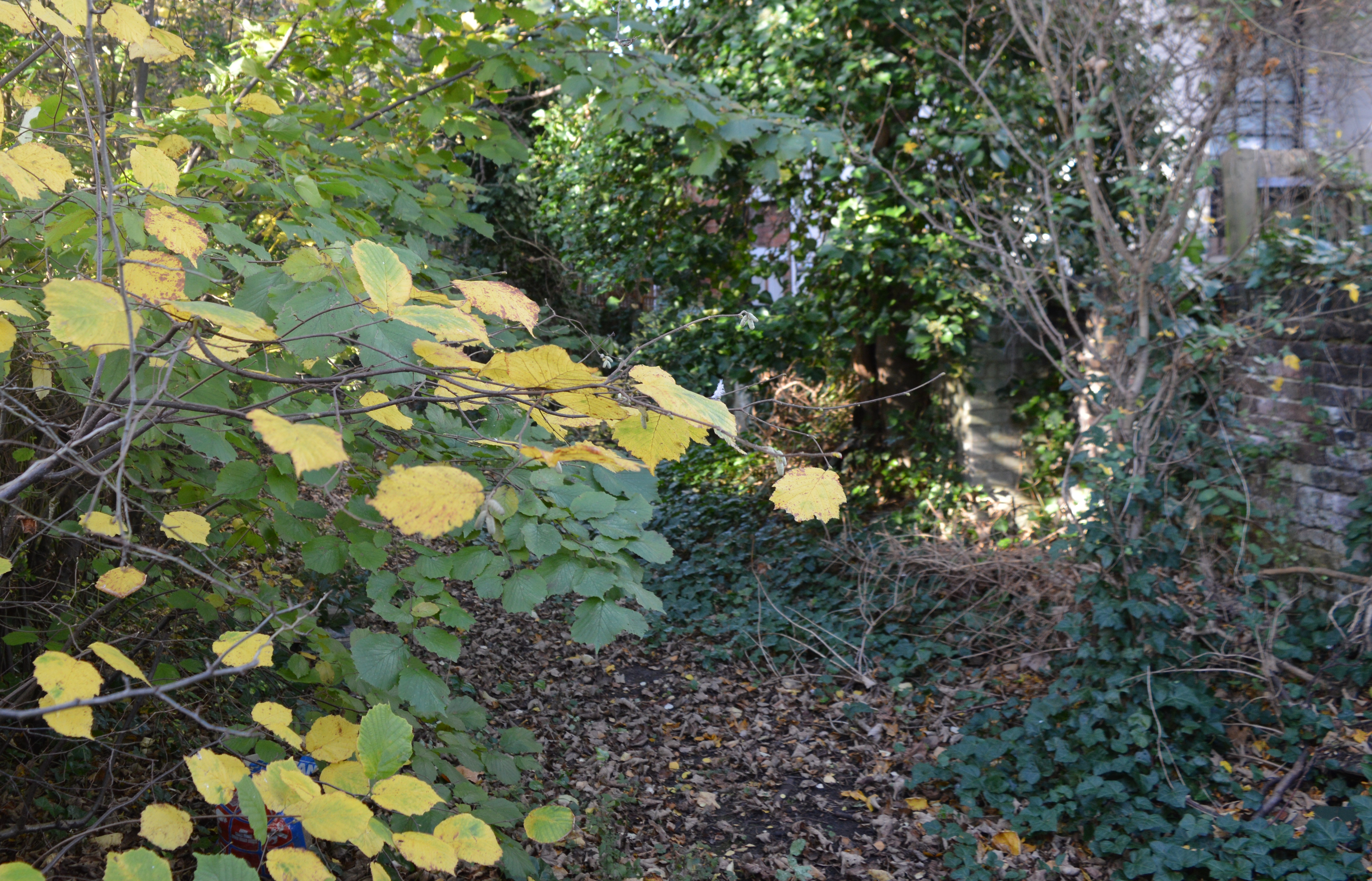

Greville Place is a 0.12-hectare (0.30-acre) nature reserve in Kilburn in the London Borough of Camden. It is a Site of Local Importance for Nature Conservation.

Habitats include a pond and beehives, and woodland with a mature cooper beech and a black mulberry distorted with age. There are invertebrates such as stag beetles, frogs, toads and newts. Shade-tolerant plants include enchanter's-nightshade, lords-and-ladies and wood avens.
