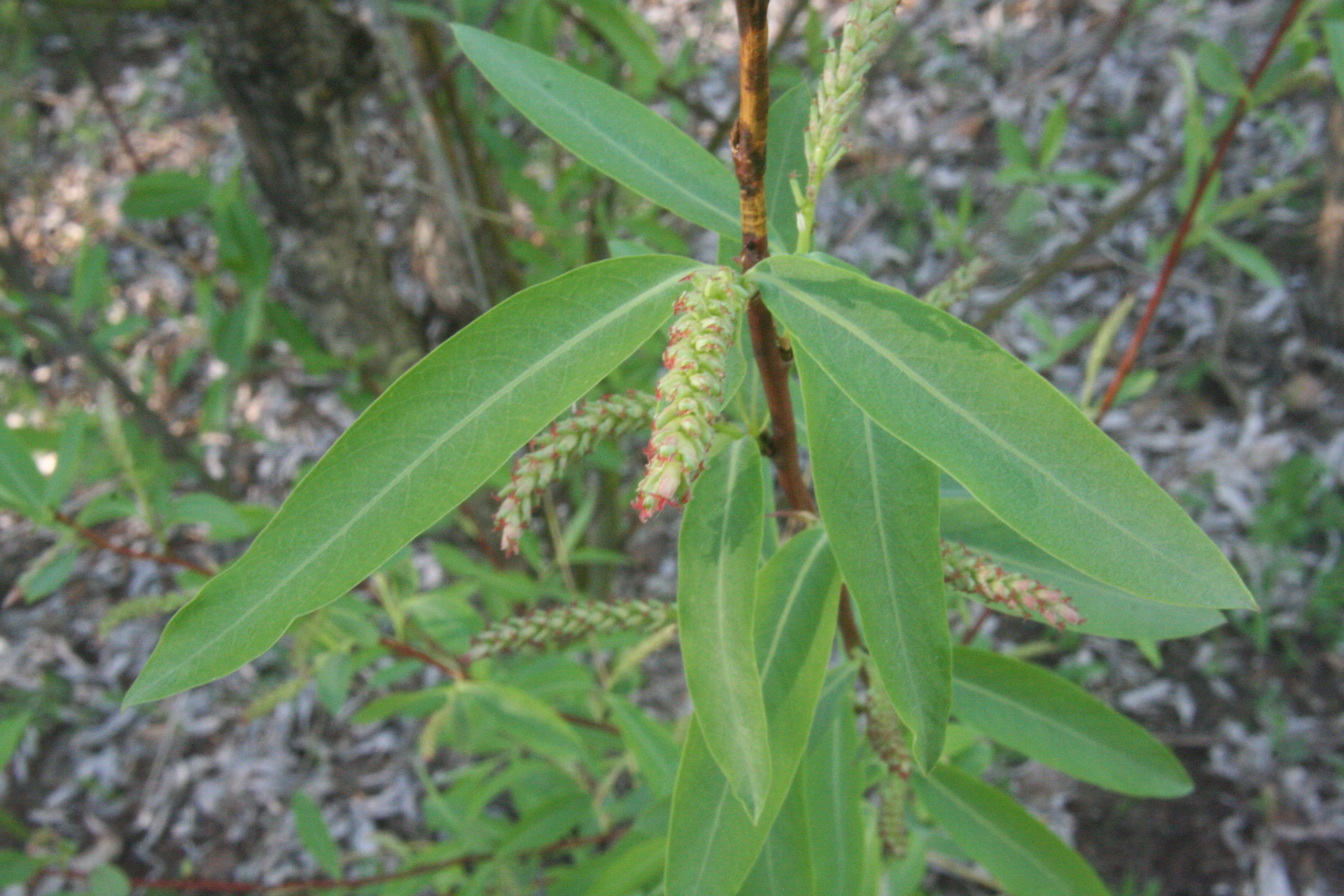
- Leaves and catkins

Conservation status
- Vulnerable (IUCN 2.3)

Scientific classification
- Kingdom: Plantae
- Clade: Tracheophytes
- Clade: Angiosperms
- Clade: Eudicots
- Clade: Rosids
- Order: Malpighiales
- Family: Salicaceae
- Genus: Salix
- Species: S. arbutifolia

Binomial name
- Salix arbutifolia Pall.

Synonyms
- List: Chosenia arbutifolia (Pall.) A.K.Skvortsov; Chosenia bracteosa (Turcz. ex Trautv. & C.A.Mey.) Nakai; Chosenia eucalyptoides (F.N.Meijer) Nakai; Chosenia macrolepis (Turcz.) Kom.; Chosenia splendida (Nakai) Nakai; Salix bracteata Andersson; Salix bracteosa Turcz. ex Trautv. & C.A.Mey.; Salix eucalyptoides F.N.Meijer; Salix macrolepis Turcz.; Salix splendida Nakai

= Salix arbutifolia =

Genus of trees

Salix arbutifolia, synonym Chosenia arbutifolia, is a flowering plant in the family Salicaceae, native to Japan, Korea, northeastern China, Siberia and the Russian Far East. It has been treated as the sole member of genus Chosenia.

== Description ==
It is a deciduous, wind-pollinated tree generally reaching a height of 20–30 m with a columnar crown and grey-brown peeling bark. The leaves are 5–8 cm long and 1.5-2.3 cm broad, with a very finely serrated to nearly entire margin, and an acuminate apex. The flowers are aggregated in pendulous catkins 1–3 cm long; it is dioecious, with male and female flowers on separate trees. It is a fast-growing pioneer tree on sand and pebble river banks.

== Distribution ==
Salix arbutifolia is native to the Russian Far East (Khabarovsk Krai, the Kuril Islands, Magadan Oblast, Primorsky Krai, and Sakhalin), Siberia (Buryatia, Chita Oblast, Irkutsk Oblast, and the Sakha Republic), North-Central China, Inner Mongolia, Japan, and Korea.

== Cultivation ==
Traditionally grown alongside mountain river banks, owing to its favorable characteristics such as strong stress resistance and fast growth, it would be useful for landscape planting, but is hard to propagate and has been categorized as endangered in China. A high-quality chromosome-level genome has been produced with a total size of 338.93 Mb to provide comprehensive information for germplasm protection and future functional genomic studies.
