= Alexey Skvortsov =

Russian botonist (1920–2008)

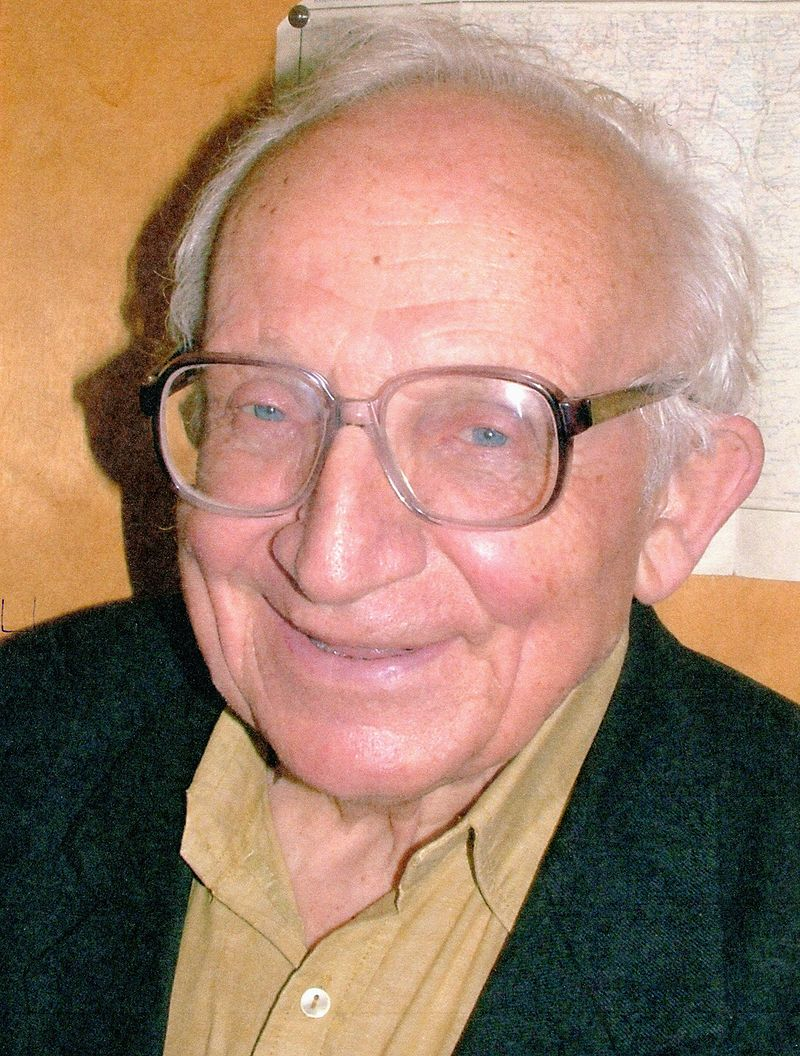
Alexey K. Skvortsov.

Alexey Konstantinovich Skvortsov (Ru:Алексе́й Константи́нович Скворцо́в) (9 February 1920 – 8 May 2008) was a Soviet botanist and biologist, a specialist on amentiferous plants—willows (Salix), poplars (Populus), and birches (Betula) as well as plants of the evening primrose family (Onagraceae). A.K. Skvortsov was, at the same time, well known in Russia as an editor in Priroda (Nature) Magazine (1971–2005) and author of many articles on botany, evolutionary biology, and Darwinism.

== Career ==
A botanist of vast erudition, Skvortsov was a surveyor and contributor to many regional floras and a tireless collector of plant specimens. He collected at least 80,000 plant samples while walking across nearly all of the Soviet Union including the most remote regions of Russia and adjacent republics. He traveled in many other countries, including Northern and Central Europe, the United States, India, and China. The establishment of the Herbarium at the Main Botanical Garden in Moscow as a world-class depository with a vast foreign exchange program is largely due to Skvortsov's efforts. He also made additions to the living collection of the Main Botanical Garden. His approach toward botany and evolution inspired him to undertake experimental work in plant introduction. Together with a team of colleagues and students, he successfully worked on domesticating and improving the taste of blue honeysuckles (Lonicera Section Caerulea). He also developed a cultivar of an apricot hardy in Moscow. Skvortsov played a role as a conservation advocate proposing and facilitating the establishment of a new national park in his homeland, Kaluga Oblast and Smolensk Oblast of Central European Russia. He cared about the natural heritage of his country, but also about preservation of the Russian language. He spoke out for high language standards in scientific publications.

== Legacy ==
A.K. Skvortsov is commemorated in the naming of the following plants:

- Festuca skvortsovii E. Alexeev
- Salix alexi-skvortsovii A.P. Khokhr.
- Legousia skvortsovii Proskur.
- Circaea x skvortsovii Boufford
- Potamogeton skvortsovii G.Yu. Klinkova
- and others.
