= Circaea glabrescens =

Scientific classification
- Kingdom: Plantae
- Clade: Tracheophytes
- Clade: Angiosperms
- Clade: Eudicots
- Clade: Rosids
- Order: Myrtales
- Family: Onagraceae
- Subfamily: Onagroideae
- Tribe: Circaeeae
- Genus: Circaea
- Species: C. glabrescens

Binomial name
- Circaea glabrescens (Pamp.) Hand.-Mazz.

Species of flowering plant

Circaea glabrescens is a species of flowering plant in the evening primrose family Onagraceae.
