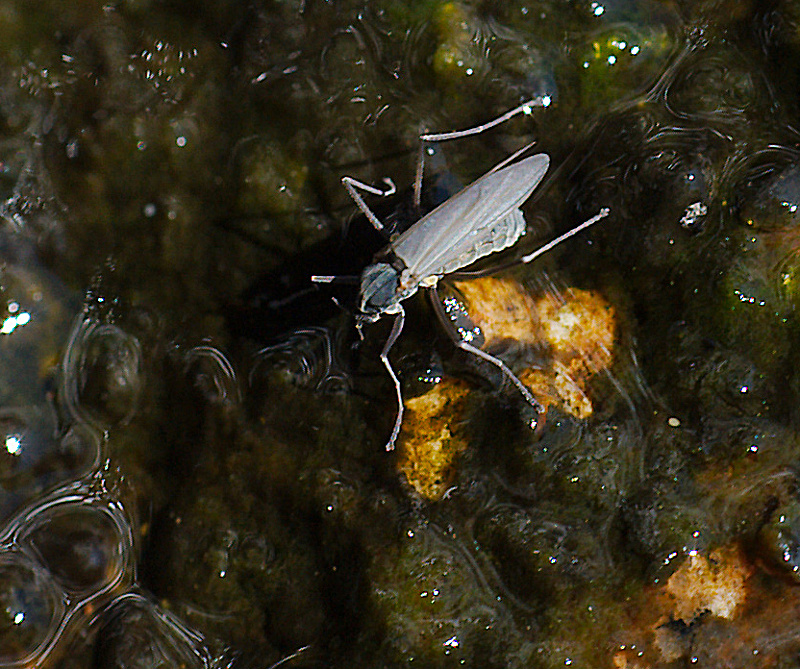
- Telmatogeton japonicus

Scientific classification
- Kingdom: Animalia
- Phylum: Arthropoda
- Clade: Pancrustacea
- Class: Insecta
- Order: Diptera
- Family: Chironomidae
- Subfamily: Telmatogetoninae
- Genus: Telmatogeton; Schiner, 1866

Type species
- T. sanctipauli Schiner, 1866

Species
- See text

Synonyms
- Psamathiomya Deby, 1889; Psammathiomyia Edwards, 1929; Halirytus Eaton, 1875

= Telmatogeton =

Genus of flies

Telmatogeton is a genus of midges in the non-biting midge family (Chironomidae).

== Species ==
- T. abnormis (Terry, 1913)
- T. alaskensis Coquillett, 1900
- T. atlanticum Oliveira, 1950
- T. australicus Womersley, 1936
- T. fluviatilis Wirth, 1947
- T. goughi Sæther & Andersen, 2011
- T. hirtus Wirth, 1947
- T. japonicus Tokunaga, 1933
- T. latipennis Wirth, 1949
- T. macswaini Wirth, 1949
- T. minor Kieffer, 1914
- T. murrayi Sæther, 2009
- T. namum Oliveira, 1950
- T. pacificus Tokunaga, 1935
- T. pectinatus (Deby, 1889)
- T. pusillum Edwards, 1933
- T. sanctipauli Schiner, 1866
- T. torrenticola (Terry, 1913)
- T. trilobatus (Kieffer, 1911)
- T. trochanteratum Edwards, 1931
- T. williamsi Wirth, 1947
