= Circaea repens =

Scientific classification
- Kingdom: Plantae
- Clade: Embryophytes
- Clade: Tracheophytes
- Clade: Spermatophytes
- Clade: Angiosperms
- Clade: Eudicots
- Clade: Rosids
- Order: Myrtales
- Family: Onagraceae
- Subfamily: Onagroideae
- Tribe: Circaeeae
- Genus: Circaea
- Species: C. repens

Binomial name
- Circaea repens Wall. ex Asch. & Magnus

Species of flowering plant

Circaea repens is a species of flowering plant in the evening primrose family Onagraceae. It is native to Assam, South-Central China, East and West Himalaya, Myanmar, Nepal, Pakistan, and Tibet.
