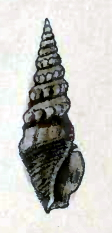
- Drawing of a shell of Clavus japonicus

Scientific classification
- Kingdom: Animalia
- Phylum: Mollusca
- Class: Gastropoda
- Subclass: Caenogastropoda
- Order: Neogastropoda
- Superfamily: Conoidea
- Family: Drilliidae
- Genus: Clavus
- Species: C. japonicus

Binomial name
- Clavus japonicus (Lischke, 1869)

Synonyms
- Drillia japonica Lischke, 1869; Inquisitor japonicum [sic] (incorrect gender ending); Inquisitor japonicus (Lischke, 1869); Tylotiella japonica (Lischke, 1869)

= Clavus japonicus =

Species of gastropod

Clavus japonicus is a species of sea snail, a marine gastropod mollusk in the family Drilliidae.

== Description ==
The length of the shell attains 16 mm.

The elevated spire is acute, with a ridge below the sutures. The 8 longitudinal ribs are rounded, oblique, crossed by close strong striae, and terminate above on the periphery. The color of the shell is yellowish brown with two chestnut bands, or the lower one broader so as to cover the lower portion of the body whorl. The anal sinus is small, but rather deep. The shell shows two decided varices on the body whorl and one on the penultimate whorl.

== Distribution ==
This marine species occurs off Japan, Hong Kong, the Philippines and off the Solomon Islands .
