= Telmatogeton alaskensis =

Scientific classification
- Domain: Eukaryota
- Kingdom: Animalia
- Phylum: Arthropoda
- Class: Insecta
- Order: Diptera
- Family: Chironomidae
- Genus: Telmatogeton
- Species: T. alaskensis

Binomial name
- Telmatogeton alaskensis Coquillett, 1900

Species of fly

Telmatogeton alaskensis is a species of midge in the family Chironomidae.
