= Thalassomya bureni =

Scientific classification
- Kingdom: Animalia
- Phylum: Arthropoda
- Clade: Pancrustacea
- Class: Insecta
- Order: Diptera
- Family: Chironomidae
- Genus: Thalassomya
- Species: T. bureni

Binomial name
- Thalassomya bureni Wirth, 1949

Species of fly

Thalassomya bureni is a species of midge in the family Chironomidae.
