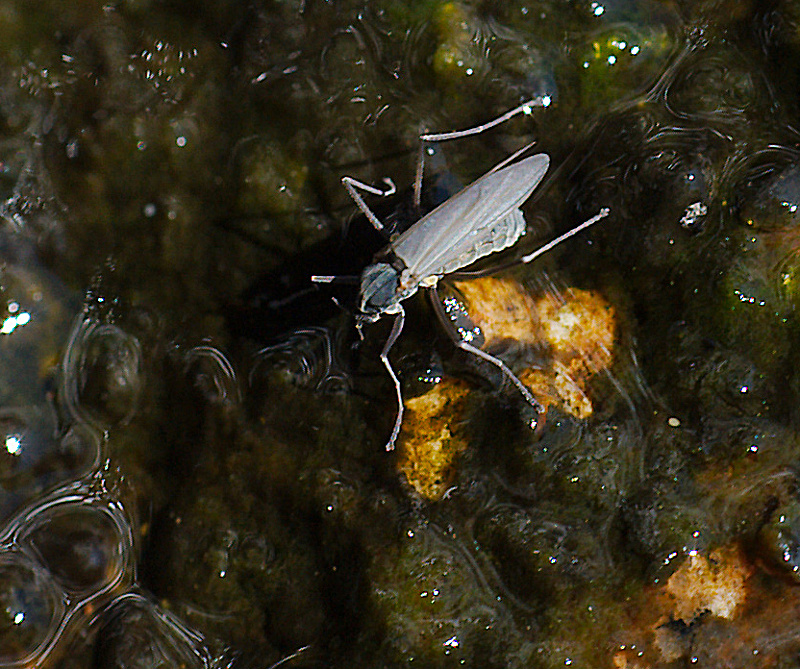

Scientific classification
- Domain: Eukaryota
- Kingdom: Animalia
- Phylum: Arthropoda
- Class: Insecta
- Order: Diptera
- Family: Chironomidae
- Genus: Telmatogeton
- Species: T. japonicus

Binomial name
- Telmatogeton japonicus Tokunaga, 1933

= Telmatogeton japonicus =

Species of fly

Telmatogeton japonicus is a species of midge in the family Chironomidae. It is native to Japan and introduced to North America and Europe.
