= Thalassomya =

- Thalassomya bureni

Scientific classification
- Kingdom: Animalia
- Phylum: Arthropoda
- Clade: Pancrustacea
- Class: Insecta
- Order: Diptera
- Family: Chironomidae
- Subfamily: Telmatogetoninae
- Genus: Thalassomya; Schiner, 1856

Species
- See text

Synonyms
- Thalassomyia Schiner, 1856

Genus of flies

Thalassomya is a genus of marine midges in the non-biting midge family (Chironomidae).

== Ecology ==
Thalassomya are associated with intertidal marine environments, with all known species known to inhabit the intertidal zone. The larval stages of these insects are always present in association with algae attached to rocks. The algae and algal detritus the larva are associated with serves as their primary food source and habitat.

== Species ==
- T. africana Edwards, 1926
- T. bureni Wirth, 1949
- T. frauenfeldi Schiner, 1856
- T. gutae De Oliveira, Da Silva, & Trivinho-Strixino, 2013
- T. japonica Tokunaga & Komyo, 1996
- T. longipes Johnson, 1924
- T. maritima Wirth, 1947
- T. pilipes Edwards, 1928
- T. sabroskyi Tokunaga, 1964
- T. setosipennis Wirth, 1947
