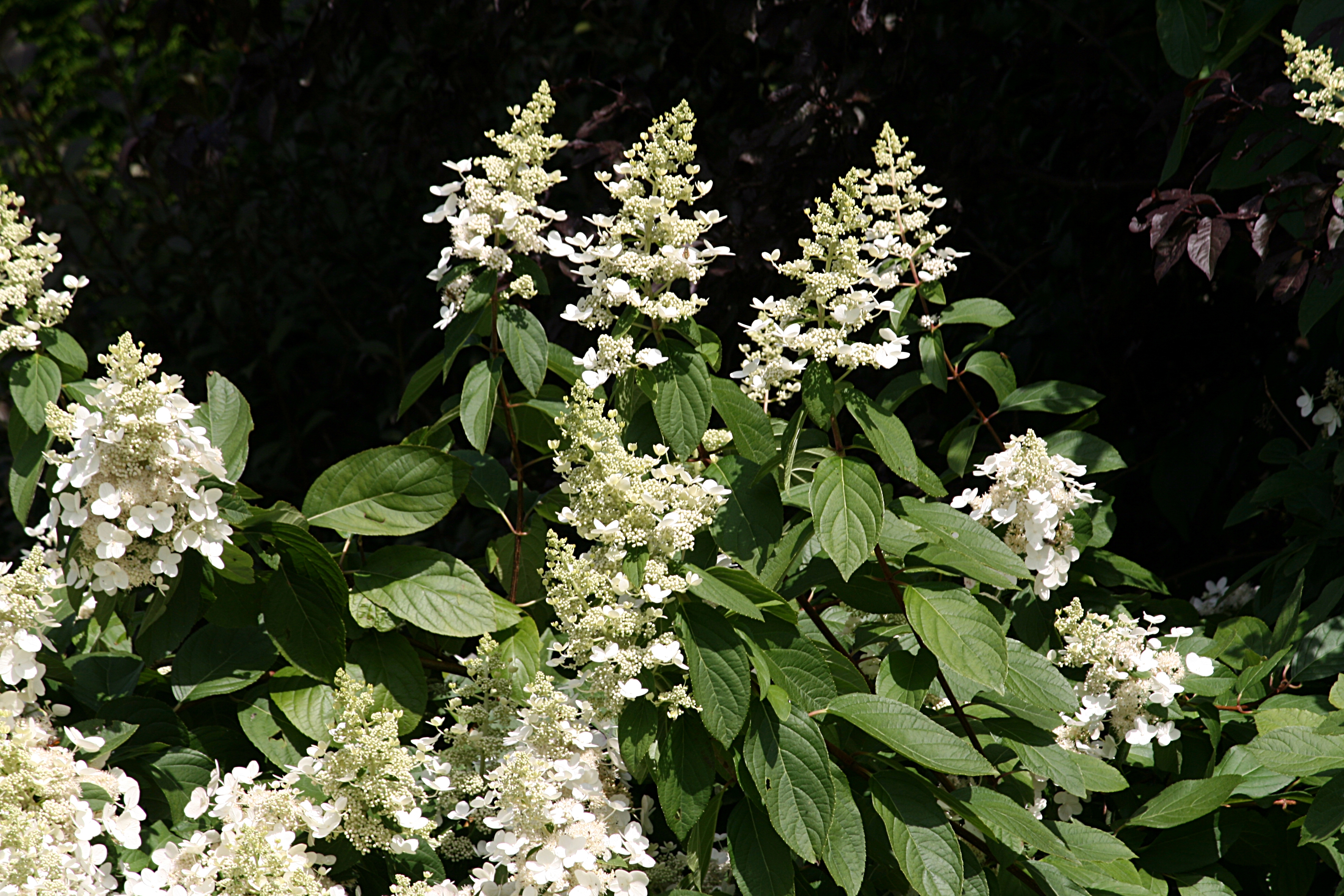

Conservation status
- Least Concern (IUCN 3.1)

Scientific classification
- Kingdom: Plantae
- Clade: Tracheophytes
- Clade: Angiosperms
- Clade: Eudicots
- Clade: Asterids
- Order: Cornales
- Family: Hydrangeaceae
- Genus: Hydrangea
- Species: H. paniculata

Binomial name
- Hydrangea paniculata Siebold

= Hydrangea paniculata =

Species of flowering plant

Hydrangea paniculata, or panicled hydrangea, is a species of flowering plant in the family Hydrangeaceae native to southern and eastern China, Korea, Japan and Russia (Sakhalin). It was first formally described by Philipp Franz von Siebold in 1829.

== Description ==
It is a deciduous shrub or small tree, 1–5 m (3.3–16.4 ft) tall by 2.5 m (8 ft) broad, growing in sparse forests or thickets in valleys or on mountain slopes.

The leaves are broadly oval, toothed and 7–15 cm (3–6 in) long. In late summer it bears large conical panicles of creamy white fertile flowers, together with pinkish-white sterile florets. Florets may open pale green, grading to white with age, thus creating a pleasing "two-tone" effect.

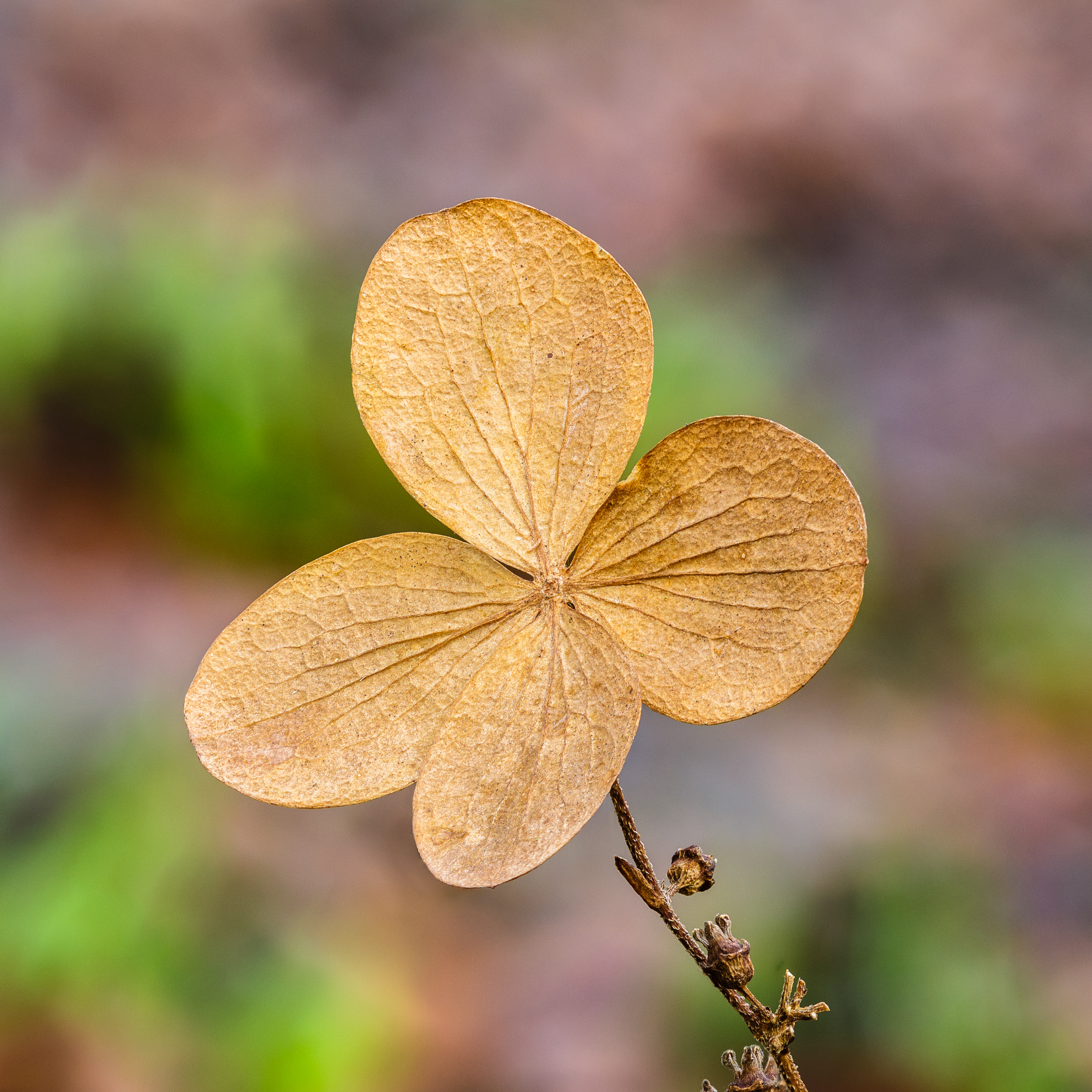
Dried petal of a Hydrangea paniculata on the bush in February.

== Cultivation ==
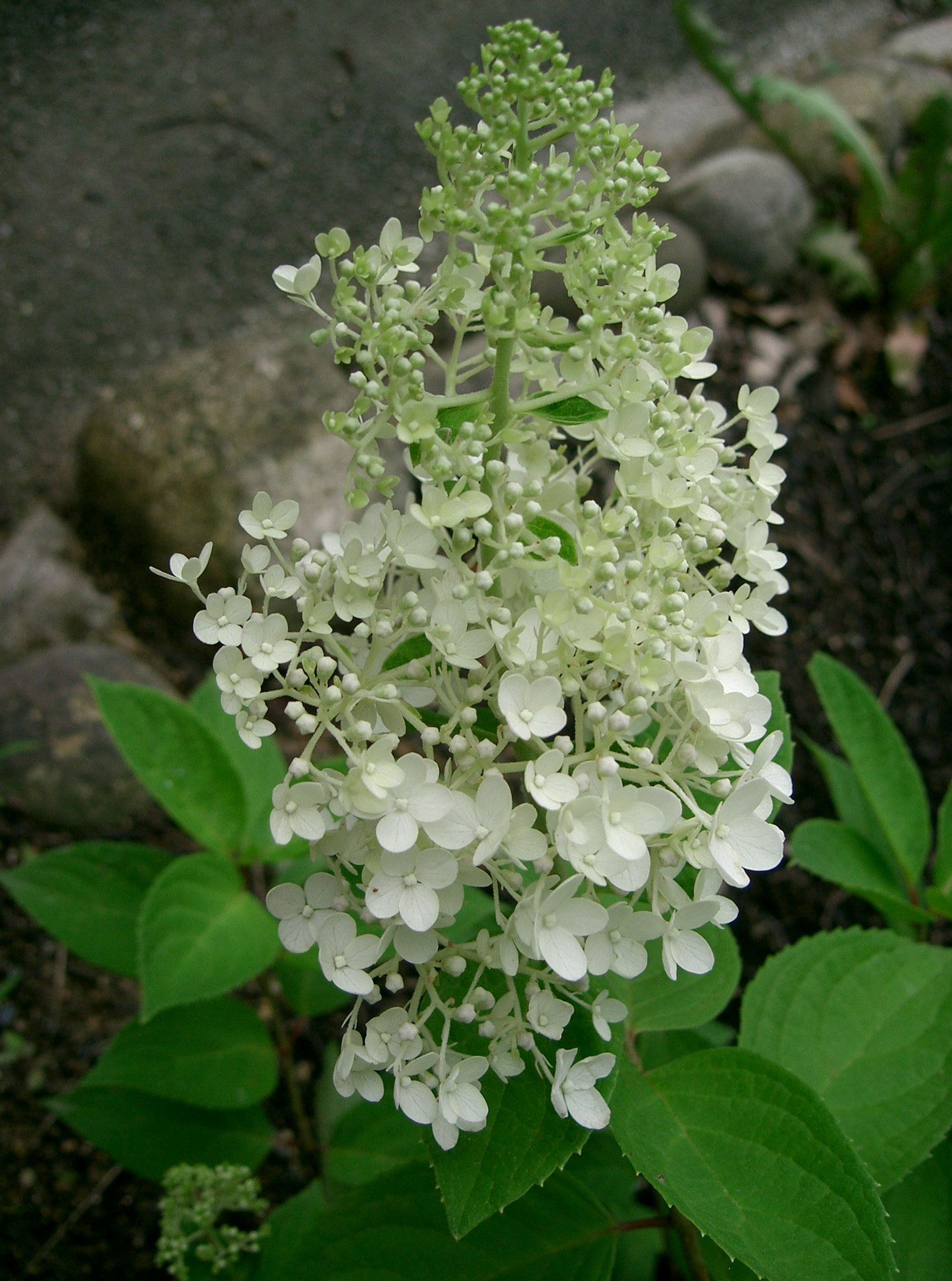
H. paniculata 'Grandiflora'

In cultivation it is pruned in spring to obtain larger flower heads.

Numerous cultivars have been developed for ornamental use, of which the following have gained the Royal Horticultural Society's Award of Garden Merit:

- 'Big Ben'
- 'Limelight' ^{(PBR)}
- 'Phantom'
- Pink Diamond = 'Interhydia'
- Pinky-Winky = 'Dvppinky' ^{(PBR)}
- 'Silver Dollar'

Those cultivars marked ^{(PBR)} are protected by plant breeders' rights from unauthorised propagation.

Other cultivars include:

- 'Praecox', a particularly early flowering cultivar

== Uses ==
Hydrangea paniculata is sometimes smoked as an intoxicant, despite the danger of illness and/or death due to the cyanide present as cyanogenic glycosides.

== Etymology ==
Hydrangea is derived from Greek, meaning 'water vessel', in reference to the shape of the capsules.

Paniculata means 'with branched-racemose or cymose inflorescences', 'tufted', 'paniculate', or 'with panicles'. This name is about the flowers of this species.
