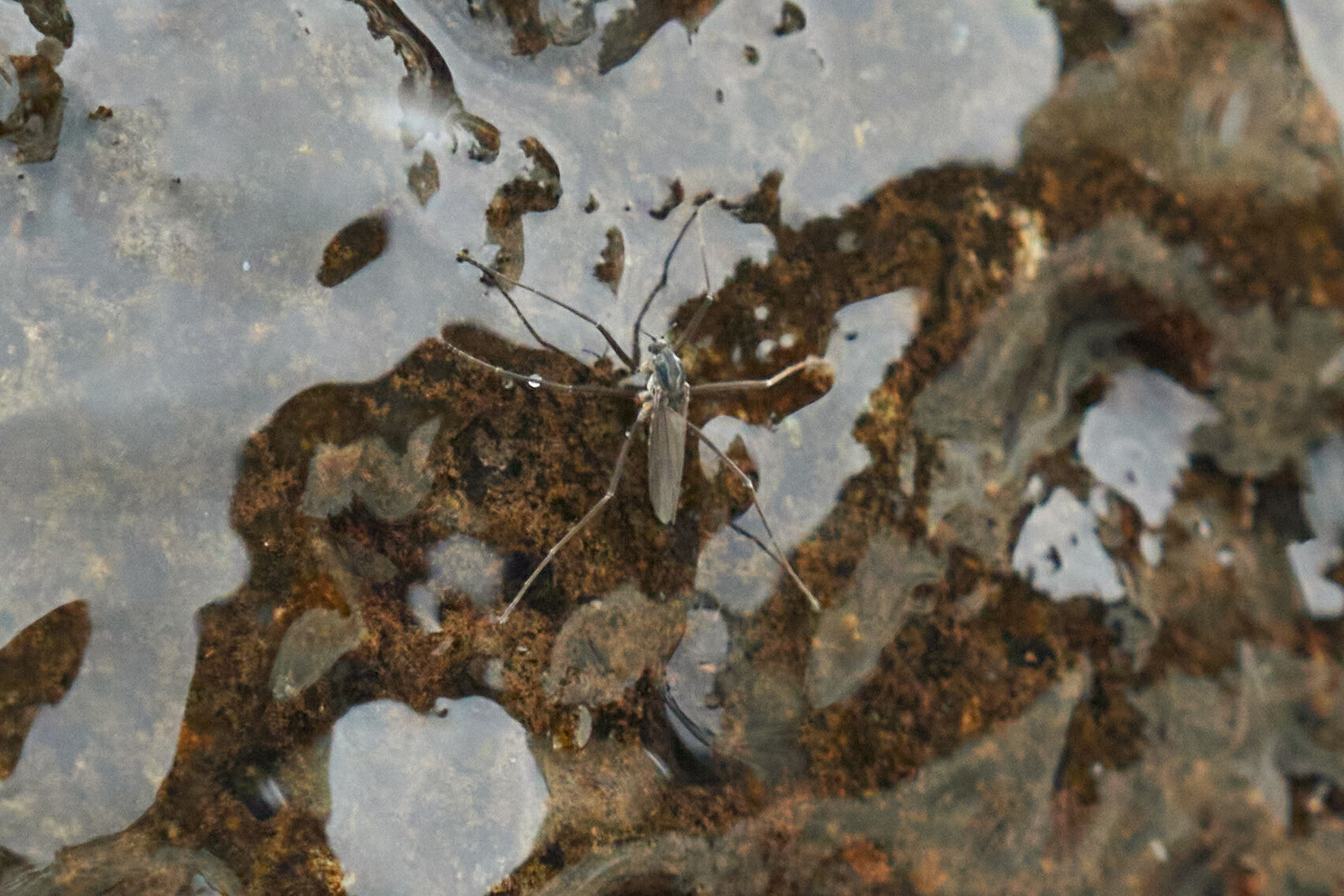
- Near rapids on the Umauma river

Scientific classification
- Domain: Eukaryota
- Kingdom: Animalia
- Phylum: Arthropoda
- Class: Insecta
- Order: Diptera
- Family: Chironomidae
- Genus: Telmatogeton
- Species: T. torrenticola

Binomial name
- Telmatogeton torrenticola (Terry, 1913)

= Telmatogeton torrenticola =

Species of midge

Telmatogeton torrenticola, the Hawaiʻi torrent midge, is a species of seaweed midge endemic to the Hawaiian islands. Unlike other seaweed midges which are typically found in intertidal environments, the Hawaiʻi torrent midge is native to moderate elevation streams and rivers near fast rapids, where it inhabits wet rock faces.

== Description ==
T. torrenticola is a small gray midge with a body length and wing length both about 5mm. The larvae are much larger, reaching lengths of 18-20mm.

== Distribution ==
T. torrenticola is endemic to the Hawaiian islands of Hawaiʻi, Maui, and Molokai, where is inhabits montane streams and rivers above 400ft in elevation. It requires rapids for habitat, inhabiting adjacent slick-faced rocks.

== Evolution ==
Despite originating from a parent species that would've inhabited the coastal intertidal zone like most seaweed midges, T. torrenticola is not found at sea level. This invasion of freshwater waterways from an ancestral coastal Telmatogeton species appears to have occurred independently at least twice in the Hawaiian islands, with the other lineage being an undescribed species endemic to west Maui.
