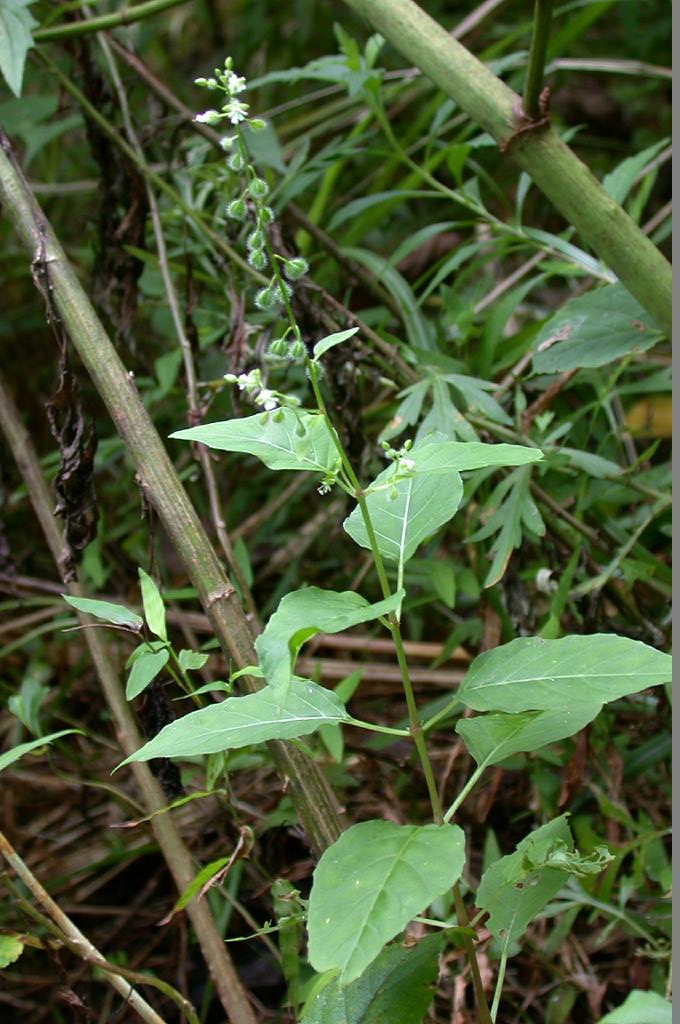

Scientific classification
- Kingdom: Plantae
- Clade: Tracheophytes
- Clade: Angiosperms
- Clade: Eudicots
- Clade: Rosids
- Order: Myrtales
- Family: Onagraceae
- Genus: Circaea
- Species: C. mollis

Binomial name
- Circaea mollis Siebold & Zucc.

= Circaea mollis =

Species of flowering plant

Circaea mollis is a species of flowering plant in the family Onagraceae.
