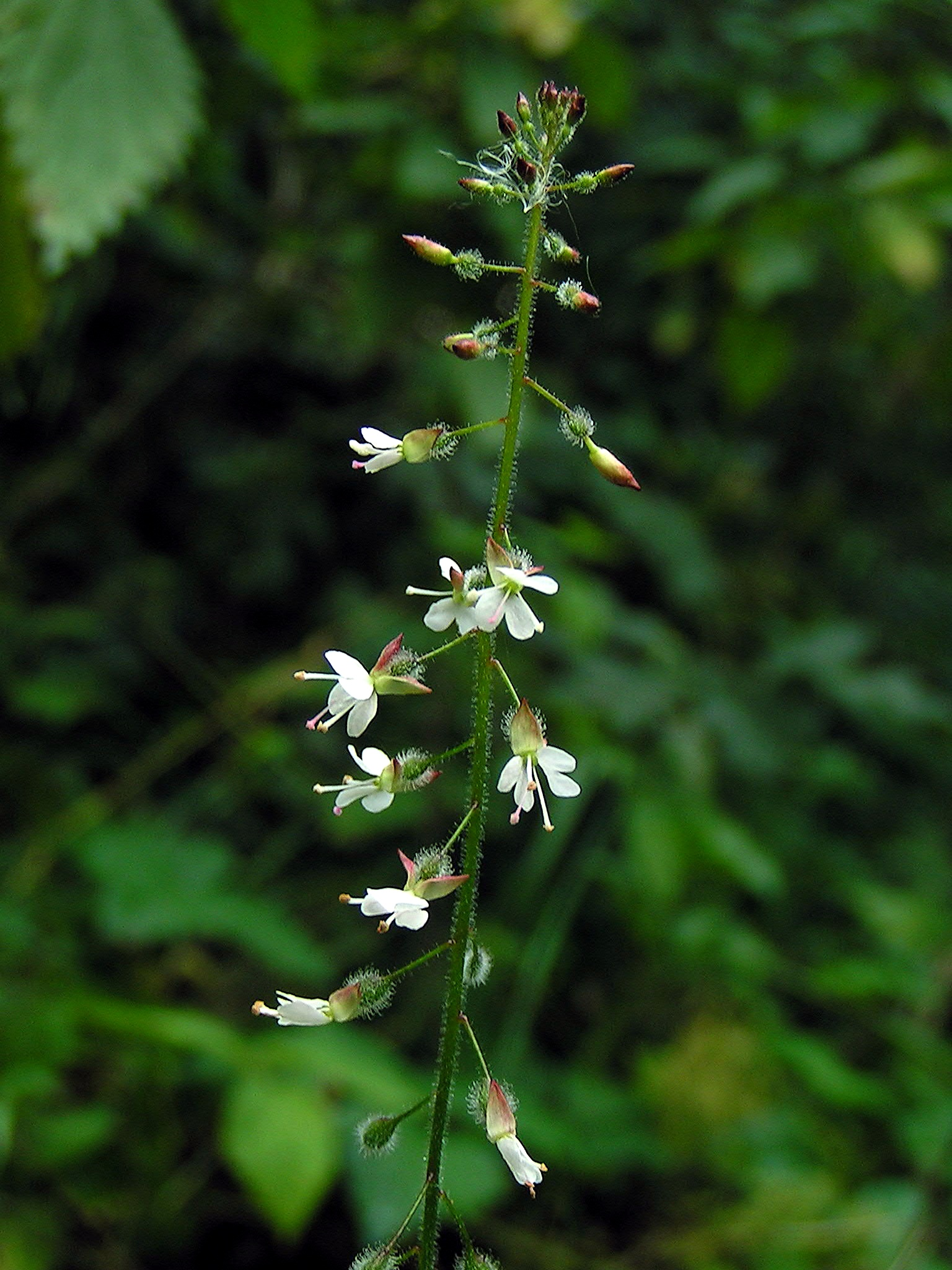
- Circaea lutetiana

Scientific classification
- Kingdom: Plantae
- Clade: Embryophytes
- Clade: Tracheophytes
- Clade: Angiosperms
- Clade: Eudicots
- Clade: Rosids
- Order: Myrtales
- Family: Onagraceae
- Subfamily: Onagroideae
- Tribe: Circaeeae
- Genus: Circaea; Tourn. ex L.

Synonyms
- Carlostephania Bubani; Ocimastrum Rupr.; Regmus Dulac

= Circaea =

Genus of flowering plants in the willowherb family

Circaea, or enchanter's nightshades, is a genus of flowering plants in the evening primrose family Onagraceae. About two dozen taxa have been described, including eight species. Plants of the genus occur throughout the temperate and boreal forests of the Northern Hemisphere. Three taxa occur in North America: Circaea alpina, Circaea canadensis, and the hybrid Circaea × sterilis. The generic name Circaea refers to the enchantress Circe from Greek mythology who is said to have used the herb as a charm.

== Description ==
Members of genus Circaea are perennial, herbaceous plants with erect stems, which may or may not be branched. The stem leaves are opposite and petiolate, with toothed edges (i.e., with dentate leaf margins). The inflorescence is a terminal, erect raceme, with additional racemes at the apices of stem branches (if any). Flowers are dimerous with 2 sepals, 2 petals, and 2 stamens. The sepals, petals, and stamens alternate such that the stamens ultimately align with the sepals. The petals are white or pink in color. The fruit is a capsule with one or two seeds. Plants disperse their seeds by producing burrs that adhere to clothing, fur, and feathers.

== Taxonomy ==
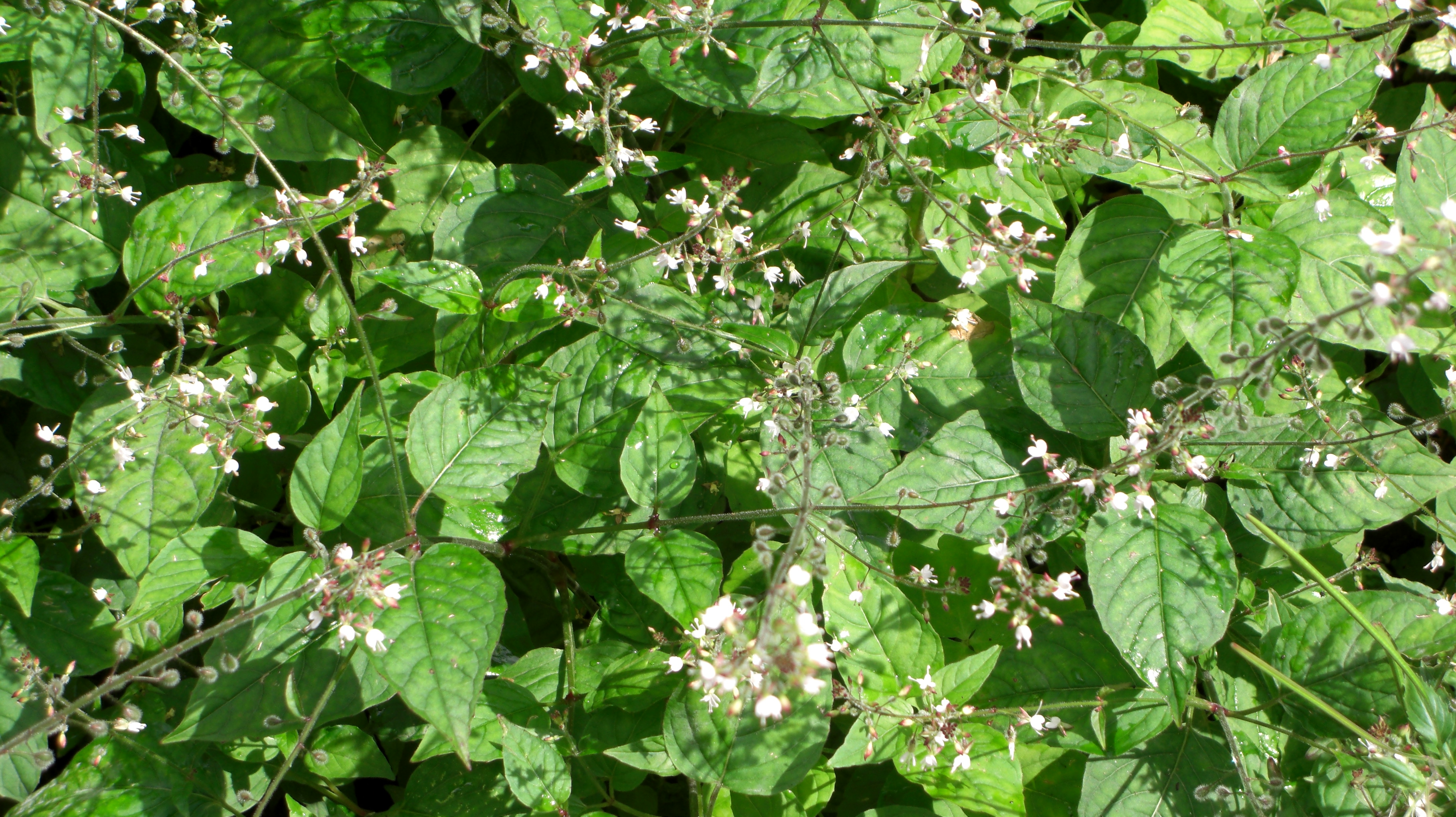
Circaea lutetiana

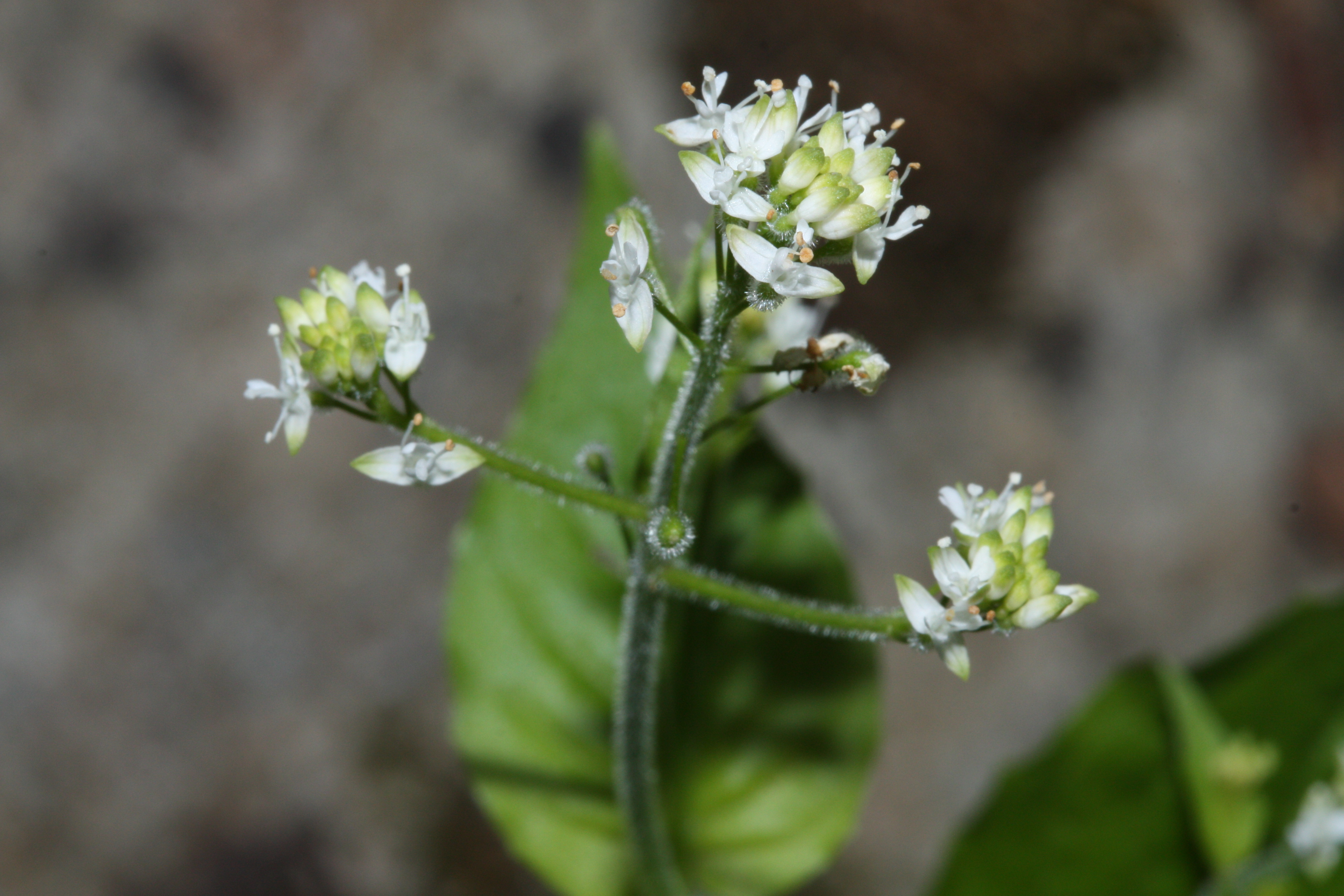
Circaea alpina

In 1753, Swedish botanist Carl Linnaeus established the genus Circaea by describing two species, Circaea lutetiana and Circaea alpina. Linnaeus also described a variety of C. lutetiana, which later became known as Circaea canadensis.

The generic name Circaea refers to the enchantress Circe from Greek mythology. Botanists in the late 16th century believed Circe used the herb to charm Odysseus' companions, hence the common name enchanter's nightshade (not to be confused with the nightshade family of plants, which are unrelated). Molecular evidence indicates the closest relative to Circaea is the lineage that gave rise to the genus Fuchsia, which diverged from it around 41 million years ago.

=== Taxa ===
As of August 2022, Plants of the World Online (POWO) accepts eight species and eight subspecies:

- Circaea alpina L.
  - Circaea alpina subsp. alpina
  - Circaea alpina subsp. angustifolia (Hand.-Mazz.) Boufford
  - Circaea alpina subsp. caulescens (Kom.) Tatew.
  - Circaea alpina subsp. imaicola (Asch. & Magnus) Kitam.
  - Circaea alpina subsp. micrantha (A.K.Skvortsov) Boufford
  - Circaea alpina subsp. pacifica (Asch. & Magnus) P.H.Raven
- Circaea canadensis (L.) Hill
  - Circaea canadensis subsp. canadensis
  - Circaea canadensis subsp. quadrisulcata (Maxim.) Boufford
- Circaea cordata Royle
- Circaea erubescens Franch. & Sav.
- Circaea glabrescens (Pamp.) Hand.-Mazz.
- Circaea lutetiana L.
- Circaea mollis Siebold & Zucc.
- Circaea repens Wall. ex Asch. & Magnus

POWO also recognizes eight named hybrids:

- Circaea × decipiens Boufford
- Circaea × dubia H.Hara
- Circaea × intermedia Ehrh.
- Circaea × mentiens Boufford
- Circaea × ovata (Honda) Boufford
- Circaea × skvortsovii Boufford
- Circaea × sterilis Boufford
- Circaea × taronensis H.Li

For example, the parents of Circaea × sterilis are C. alpina and C. canadensis. The hybrid is sterile but spreads vigorously by vegetative means.

== Distribution ==
Members of genus Circaea occur throughout the temperate and boreal forests of the Northern Hemisphere, from near sea level to 5,000 meters (16,000 ft) altitude, and from 10°–70° N latitude. Circaea alpina is the most widespread species, ranging across North America, Europe, and Asia. Likewise Circaea canadensis ranges across continents, in North America, European Russia, and Asia. Circaea lutetiana occurs throughout Europe, ranging eastward to Iran.

Three taxa are known to occur in North America: Circaea alpina, Circaea canadensis, and the hybrid Circaea × sterilis. C. alpina is wide ranging across the continent, from California to Alaska in the west, and from Newfoundland to North Carolina in the east, while C. canadensis is confined to the eastern half of North America. The hybrid, C. × sterilis, is found wherever the ranges of its parent species overlap.
