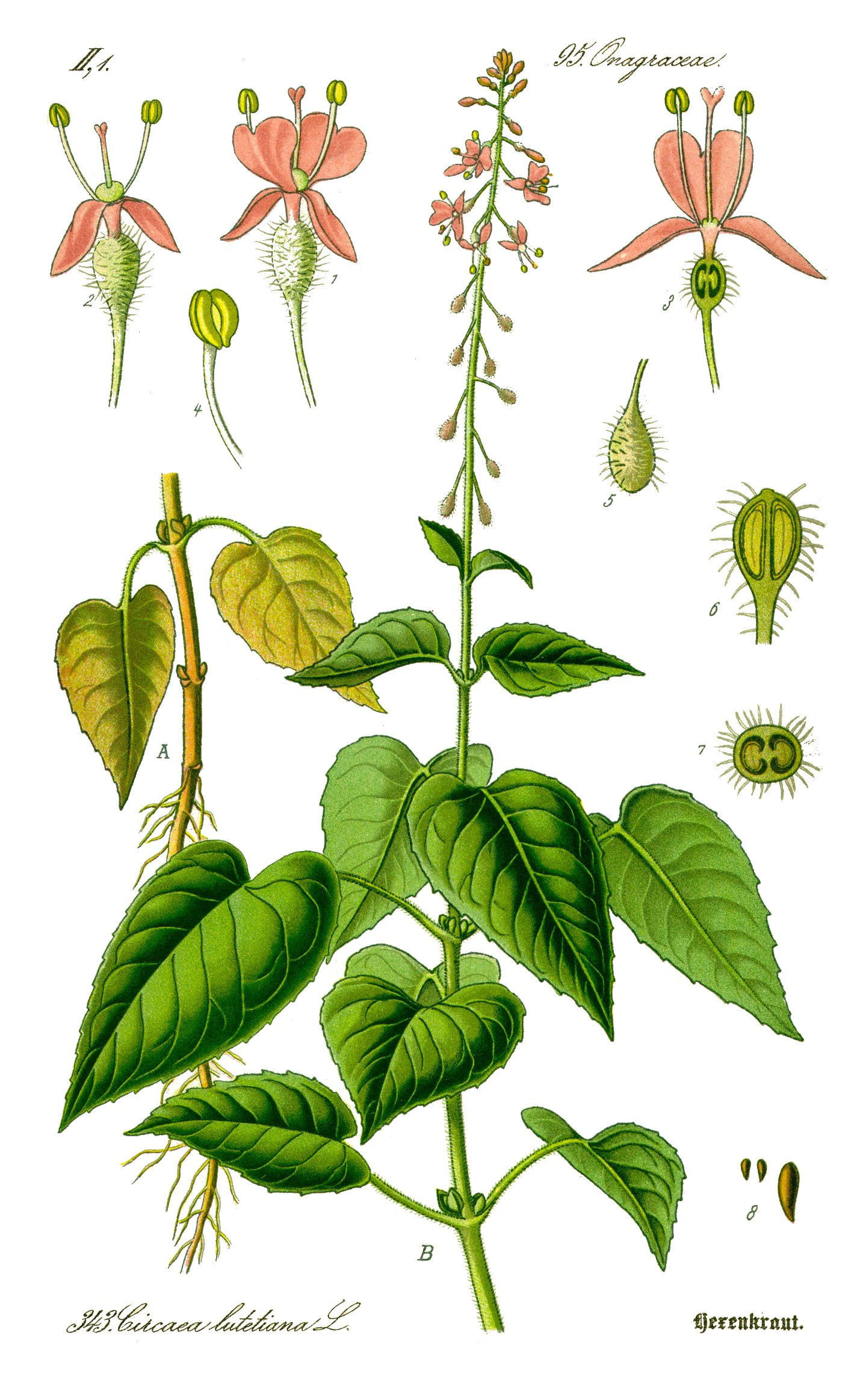
- Botanical illustration from Flora von Deutschland Österreich und der Schweiz (1885)

Scientific classification
- Kingdom: Plantae
- Clade: Embryophytes
- Clade: Tracheophytes
- Clade: Angiosperms
- Clade: Eudicots
- Clade: Rosids
- Order: Myrtales
- Family: Onagraceae
- Genus: Circaea
- Species: C. lutetiana

Binomial name
- Circaea lutetiana L.

Synonyms
- Circaea canadensis subsp. quadrisulcata (Maxim.) Boufford.

= Circaea lutetiana =

Species of flowering plant in the willowherb family

Circaea lutetiana, known as broad-leaved enchanter's nightshade, is a plant in the evening primrose family, Onagraceae.

The genus name comes from the enchantress Circe of Greek mythology and the specific designation is derived from Lutetia, the Latin name for Paris, which was sometimes referred to as the "Witch City". Despite its name it is not especially toxic, but contains a lot of the astringent tannin.

== Description ==
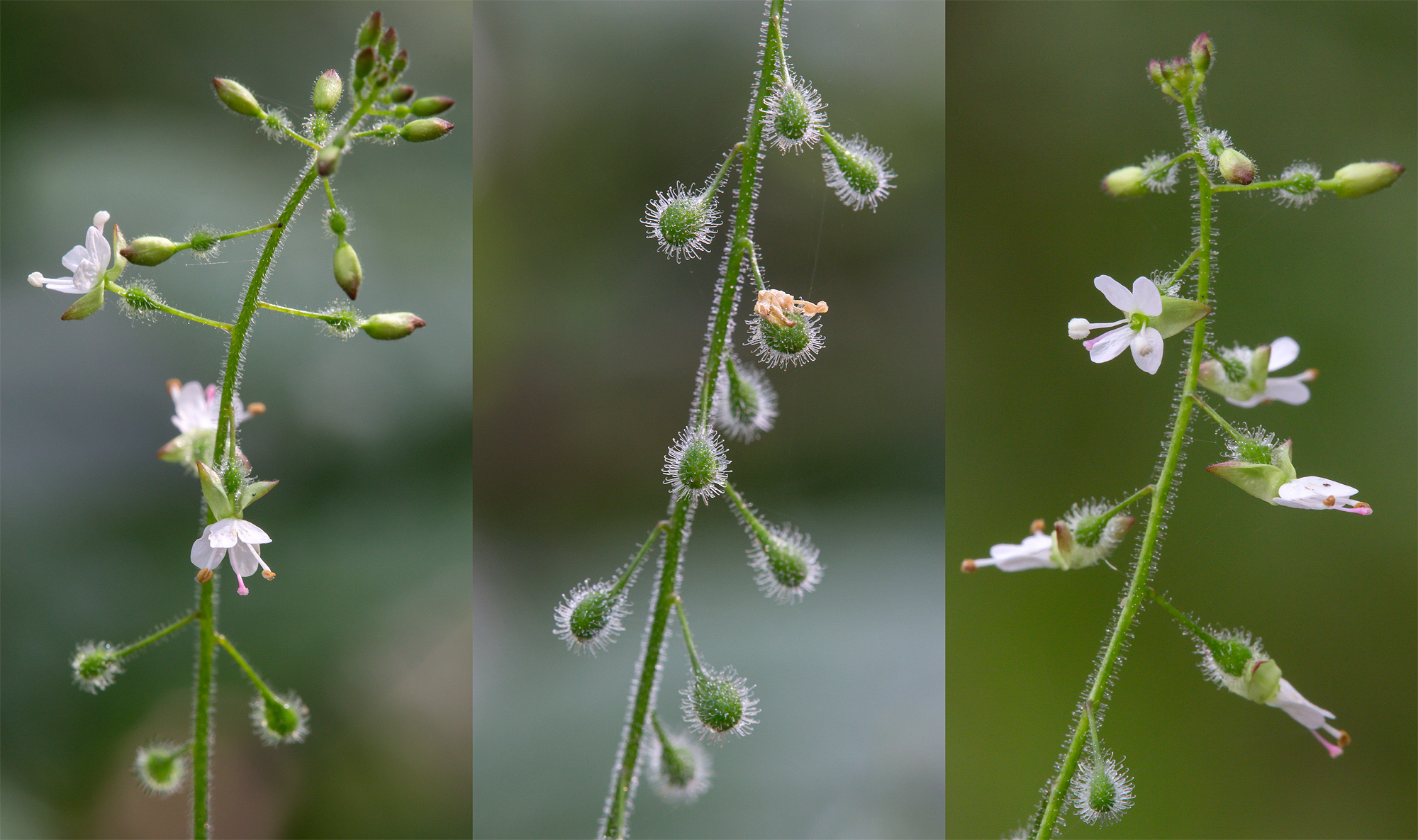
Circaea lutetiana showing flowers and burrs

Circaea lutetiana is a perennial herbaceous plant with opposite, simple leaves, on slender, green stems. The flowers are white, borne in summer. It grows 20 to 60 cm (7.9 to 23.6 in), rarely up to 75 cm (30 in) high.

The leaves are rounded or slightly notched at the base, they narrow gradually to the pointed tip and are not strongly toothed, but have sinuate edges. The leaf stalks are equally hairy all round.

The flower has 2 notched petals, 2 stamens and a 2-lobed stigma. The open flowers are well spaced along the stalk and there are no bracts at the base of individual flower stalks. The fruit consists of 2 equal cells, and usually sets seed. The flower stalks become angled downwards before fruiting. The fruit is a small bur of 3.5–5 mm which aids the plant's dispersal via zoochory.

In winter the aerial parts die off leaving an underground rhizome.

Circaea alpina will hybridize with Circaea lutetiana producing sterile offspring that persists in vegetative colonies.

== Distribution ==
The plant is native to Europe, Middle Asia, and Siberia. North American populations are now considered to be a separate species, Circaea canadensis. It grows in woods in deep shade and moist environments on nitrogen-containing clay.

== Gardening ==
It is cultivated as an ornamental garden plant. It prefers a shaded position in rich, moist soil. The cultivar 'Caveat Emptor' has leaves that are heavily mottled pink.
