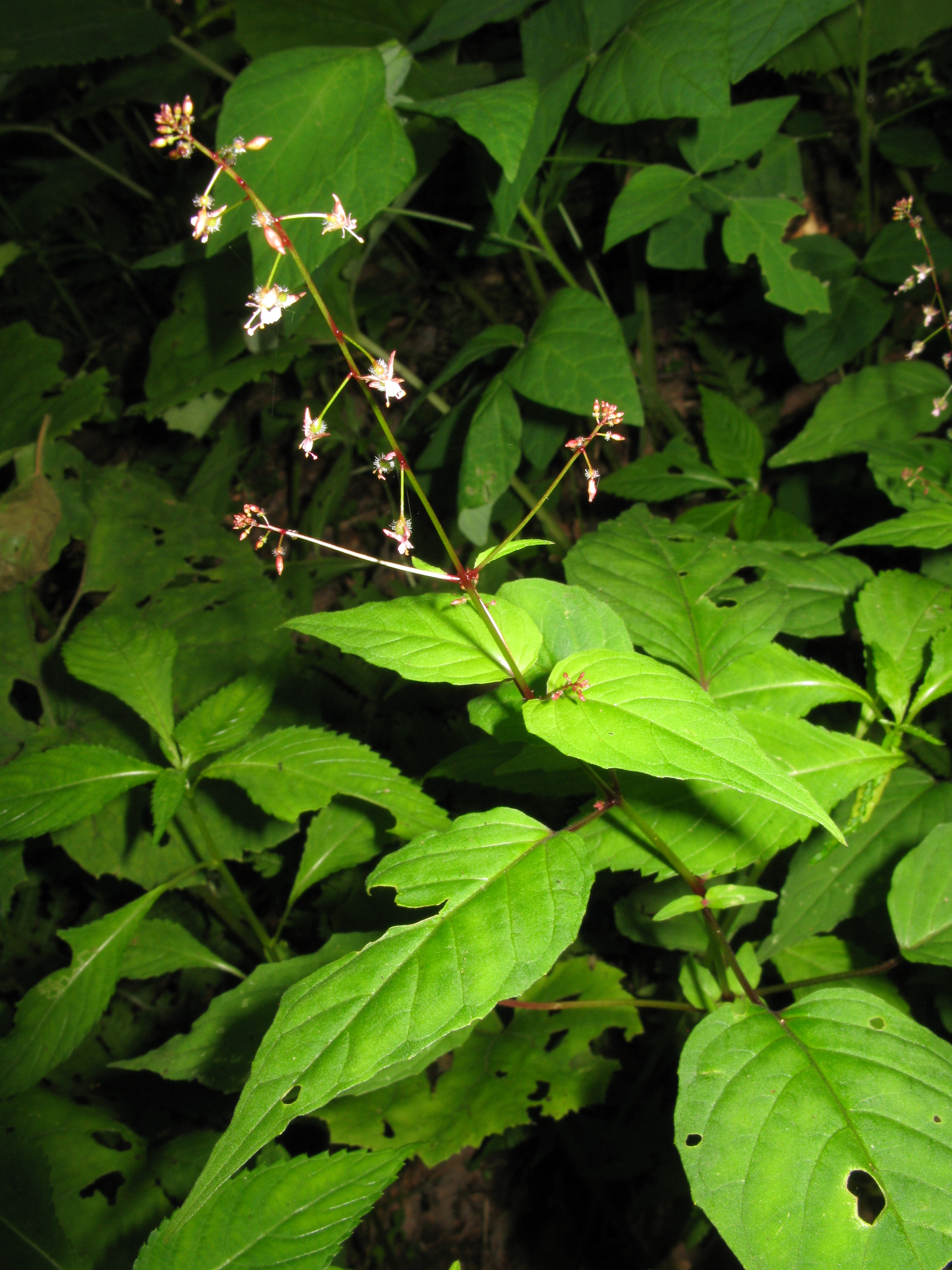
- Circaea erubescens, Aizu area, Fukushima pref., Japan

Scientific classification
- Kingdom: Plantae
- Clade: Tracheophytes
- Clade: Angiosperms
- Clade: Eudicots
- Clade: Rosids
- Order: Myrtales
- Family: Onagraceae
- Subfamily: Onagroideae
- Tribe: Circaeeae
- Genus: Circaea
- Species: C. erubescens

Binomial name
- Circaea erubescens Franch. & Sav.

= Circaea erubescens =

Species of flowering plant

Circaea erubescens is a species of flowering plant in the evening primrose family Onagraceae.
