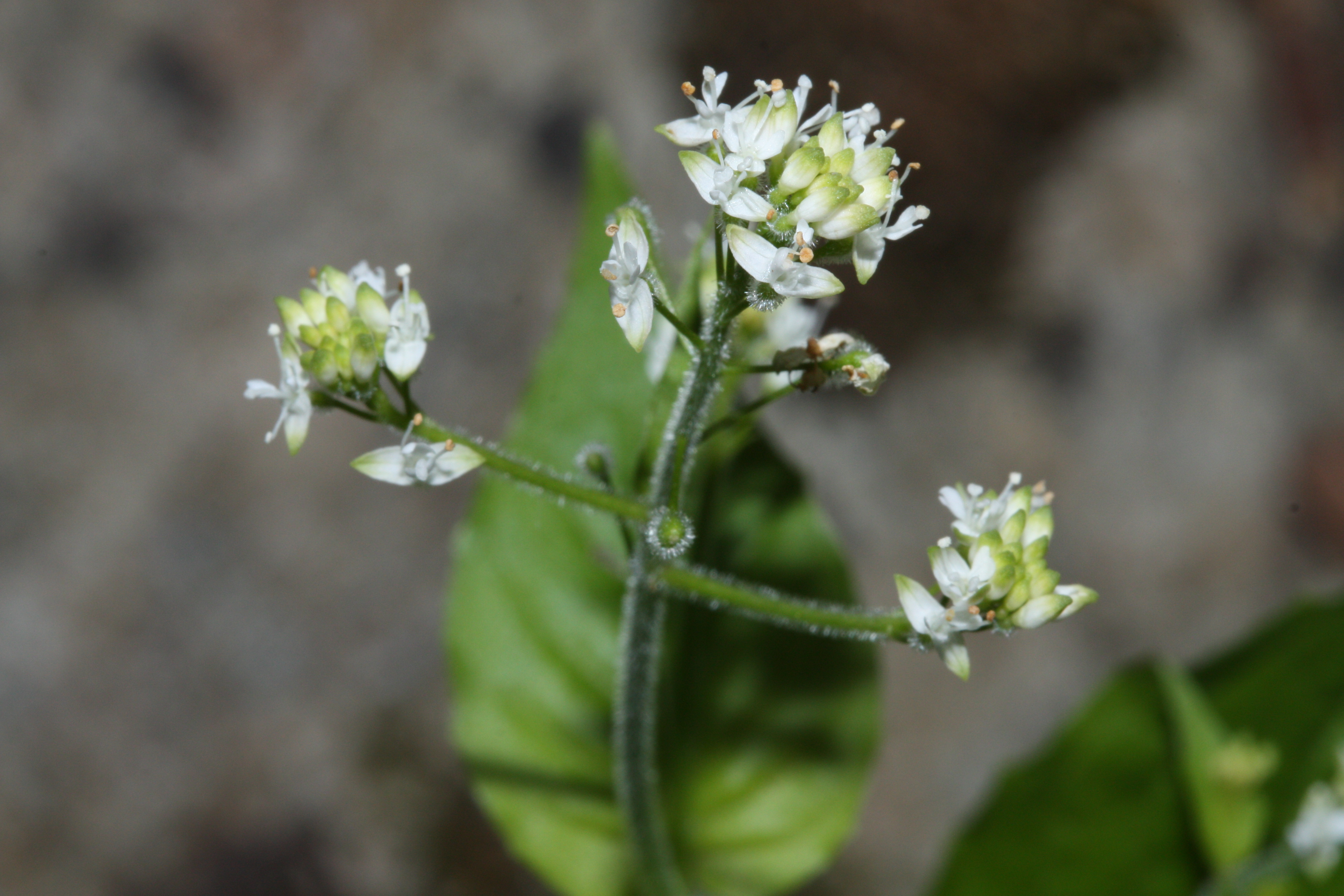

Conservation status
- Secure (NatureServe)

Scientific classification
- Kingdom: Plantae
- Clade: Embryophytes
- Clade: Tracheophytes
- Clade: Angiosperms
- Clade: Eudicots
- Clade: Rosids
- Order: Myrtales
- Family: Onagraceae
- Genus: Circaea
- Species: C. alpina

Binomial name
- Circaea alpina L.
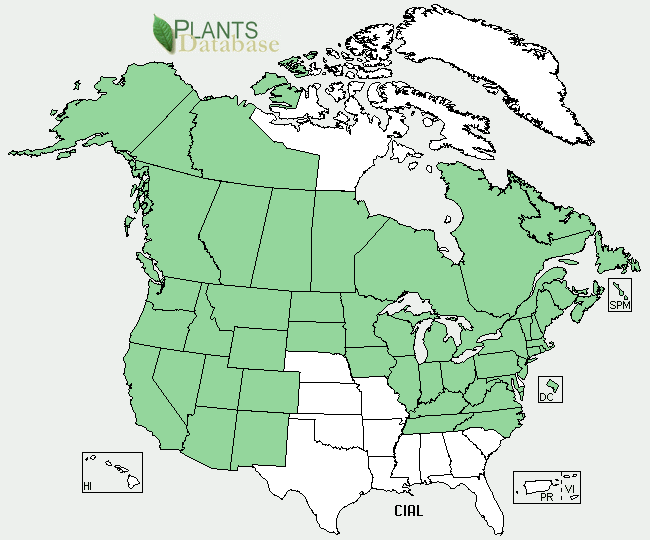
- Range within North America

= Circaea alpina =

Enchanter's nightshade

Species of flowering plant in the willowherb family

Circaea alpina, commonly called alpine enchanter's nightshade, small enchanter's nightshade, or dwarf enchanter's nightshade is a 10–30 cm (3.9–12 in) tall perennial herb found in cool forests of the Northern Hemisphere.

== Description ==
The leaves are opposite, ovate, 2–6 cm (0.8–2.4 in) and coarsely dentate. The 1.5–4 cm (0.6–1.6 in) petioles have a wing beneath. The flowers and fruits are clustered near the top of the fruiting raceme; each raceme bears 15 or less white or pink flowers in mid-May through early September. Each flower has two white to light pink petals 1–1.5 mm (0.04–0.06 in) long with two lobes. The two white sepals are 1–2 mm (0.04–0.08 in) long. The fruit is a small bur with one seed. C. alpina can reproduce vegetatively and via stolons.

== Taxonomy ==
Circaea alpina was given its scientific name by Carl Linnaeus in 1753. It is classified in the genus Circaea within the Onagraceae family. According to Plants of the World Online it has six accepted subspecies:

- Circaea alpina subsp. alpina – Widespread in the northern hemisphere
- Circaea alpina subsp. angustifolia (Hand.-Mazz.) Boufford – Native to China and Tibet
- Circaea alpina subsp. caulescens (Kom.) Tatew. – Native to Asia
- Circaea alpina subsp. imaicola (Asch. & Magnus) Kitam. – Native to southern Asia
- Circaea alpina subsp. micrantha (A.K.Skvortsov) Boufford – Northern Pakistan to Central China and northern Myanmar
- Circaea alpina subsp. pacifica (Asch. & Magnus) P.H.Raven – Western North America

Circaea alpina has 46 synonyms of the species or one of its subspecies, 16 of which are species.

Table of Synonyms
Name	Year	Rank	Synonym of:	Notes
Carlostephania minor Bubani	1899	species	subsp. alpina	= het.
Circaea alpestris Schur	1866	species	subsp. alpina	= het.
Circaea alpina var. aleutica Nieuwl.	1914	variety	subsp. pacifica	= het.
Circaea alpina var. caulescens Kom.	1905	variety	subsp. caulescens	≡ hom.
Circaea alpina f. composita Lasch	1827	form	subsp. alpina	= het.
Circaea alpina var. fertilis Döll	1843	variety	subsp. alpina	= het.
Circaea alpina var. imaicola (Asch. & Magnus) Asch. & Magnus	1870	variety	subsp. imaicola	≡ hom.
Circaea alpina f. imaicola Asch. & Magnus	1870	form	subsp. imaicola	≡ hom.
Circaea alpina var. minor Schrad.	1806	variety	subsp. alpina	= het.
Circaea alpina var. pacifica (Asch. & Magnus) M.E.Jones	1910	variety	subsp. pacifica	≡ hom.
Circaea alpina f. pacifica (Asch. & Magnus) G.N.Jones	1936	form	subsp. pacifica	≡ hom.
Circaea alpina var. pilosula (H.Hara) H.Hara	1944	variety	subsp. caulescens	= het.
Circaea alpina f. pilosula (H.Hara) Kitag.	1979	form	subsp. caulescens	= het.
Circaea alpina f. ramosa Lasch	1827	form	subsp. alpina	= het.
Circaea alpina f. simplicissima Lasch	1827	form	subsp. alpina	= het.
Circaea caucasica A.K.Skvortsov	1970	species	subsp. caulescens	= het.
Circaea caulescens (Kom.) Nakai ex H.Hara	1934	species	subsp. caulescens	≡ hom.
Circaea caulescens var. glabra H.Hara	1934	variety	subsp. alpina	= het.
Circaea caulescens var. pilosula H.Hara	1934	variety	subsp. caulescens	= het.
Circaea caulescens f. ramosissima H.Hara	1934	form	subsp. alpina	= het.
Circaea caulescens var. robusta Nakai ex H.Hara	1934	variety	subsp. caulescens	= het.
Circaea caulescens var. rosulata H.Hara	1934	variety	subsp. alpina	= het.
Circaea caulescens f. rosulata H.Hara	1934	form	subsp. alpina	= het.
Circaea cordifolia Stokes	1812	species	subsp. alpina	= het., pro syn.
Circaea decumbens Gilib.	1782	species	subsp. alpina	= het., opus utique oppr.
Circaea × dubia var. makinoi makinoi H.Hara	1959	variety	subsp. caulescens	= het.
Circaea hohuanensis S.S.Ying	1997	species	subsp. imaicola	= het.
Circaea imaicola (Asch. & Magnus) Hand.-Mazz.	1933	species	subsp. imaicola	≡ hom.
Circaea imaicola var. angustifolia Hand.-Mazz.	1933	variety	subsp. angustifolia	≡ hom.
Circaea imaicola var. mairei (H.Lév.) Hand.-Mazz.	1933	variety	subsp. angustifolia	= het.
Circaea lutetiana subsp. alpina (L.) H.Lév.	1898	subspecies	C. alpina	≡ hom.
Circaea lutetiana var. alpestris Schur	1866	variety	subsp. alpina	= het.
Circaea lutetiana var. alpina (L.) Torr.	1841	variety	C. alpina	≡ hom.
Circaea lutetiana proles alpina (L.) H.Lév.	1912	proles	C. alpina	≡ hom.
Circaea lutetiana var. mairei H.Lév.	1912	variety	subsp. angustifolia	= het.
Circaea micrantha A.K.Skvortsov	1977	species	subsp. micrantha	≡ hom.
Circaea minima Mill.	1771	species	subsp. alpina	= het.
Circaea minutula Ohwi	1933	species	subsp. imaicola	= het.
Circaea pacifica Asch. & Magnus	1871	species	subsp. pacifica	≡ hom.
Circaea pacifica f. dentata H.Lév.	1912	form	subsp. alpina	= het.
Circaea pricei Hayata	1915	species	subsp. imaicola	= het.
Circaea pricei var. mairei (H.Lév.) Hand.-Mazz.	1936	variety	subsp. angustifolia	= het.
Circaea racemosa var. alpina (L.) Hill	1799	variety	C. alpina	≡ hom., nom. superfl.
Circaea taiwaniana S.S.Ying	1978	species	subsp. imaicola	= het.
Ocimastrum minimum Rupr.	1860	species	C. alpina	≡ hom., nom. superfl.
Regmus alpinus (L.) Dulac	1867	species	C. alpina	≡ hom.
Notes: ≡ homotypic synonym; = heterotypic synonym

== Distribution ==
Circaea alpina is generally found in forests or near streams from sea level to 3,000 metres (10,000 ft).

In North America, is distributed throughout all of Canada. On the east coast of the US it can be found from Maine to North Carolina, and on the west coast, from Alaska to California. It is also established in most non-coastal states, excluding parts of the midwest and southeast regions.

In Eurasia, the range of C. alpina spans from Northern Europe, south to Albania and Bulgaria, and east to Korea and Japan. C. alpina prefers a moist, upland habitat.

== Hybrids ==
Circaea alpina will hybridize with Circaea lutetiana producing sterile offspring that persists in vegetative colonies.
