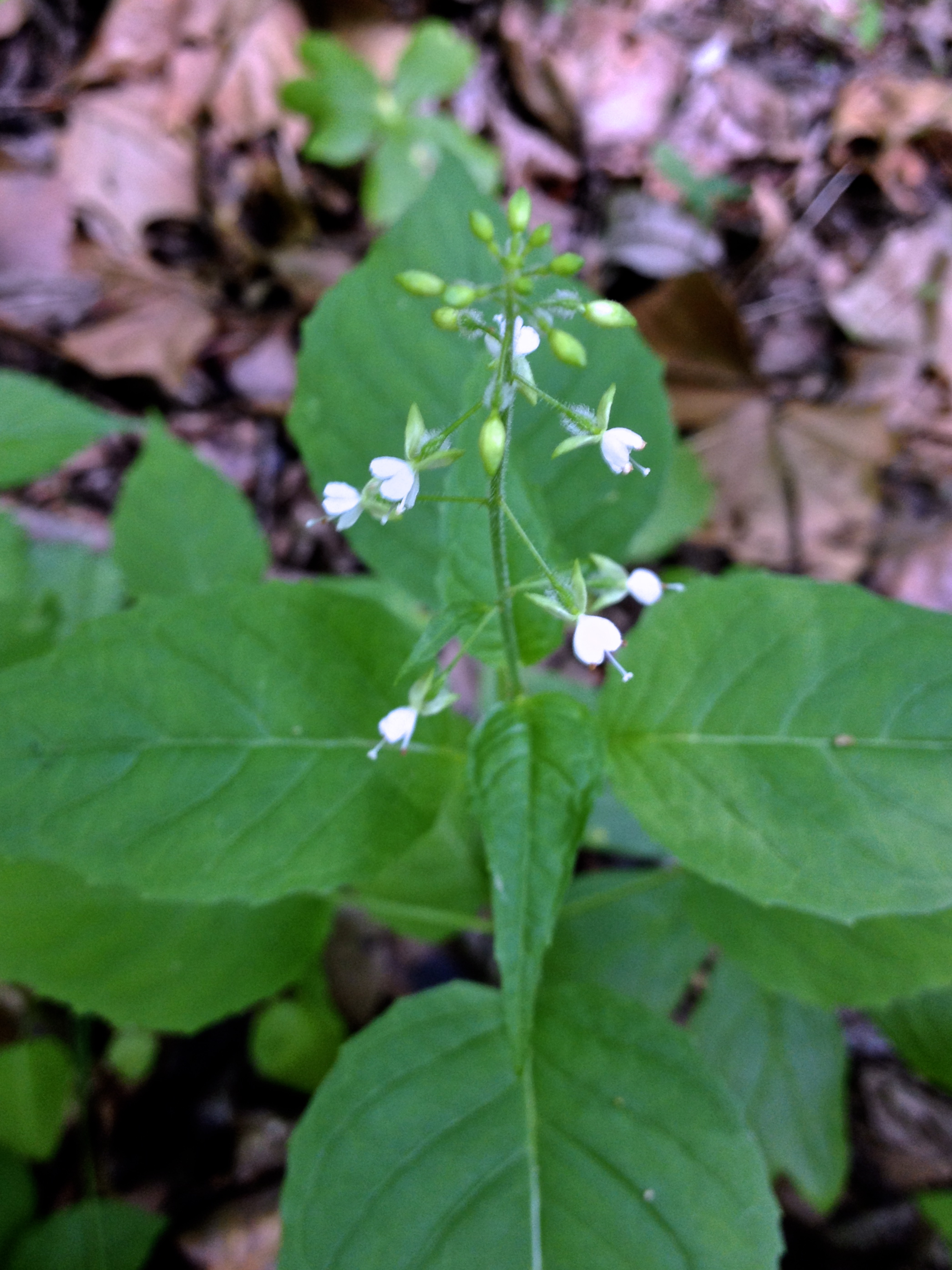
- In Fairfax County, Virginia

Scientific classification
- Kingdom: Plantae
- Clade: Tracheophytes
- Clade: Angiosperms
- Clade: Eudicots
- Clade: Rosids
- Order: Myrtales
- Family: Onagraceae
- Genus: Circaea
- Species: C. canadensis

Binomial name
- Circaea canadensis (L.) Hill

Subspecies
- C. c. subsp. canadensis; C. c. subsp. quadrisulcata

Synonyms
- List: Circaea latifolia; Circaea lutetiana subsp. canadensis; Circaea lutetiana var. canadensis; Circaea maximowiczii; Circaea quadrisulcata; Circaea quadrisulcata subsp. canadensis; Circaea quadrisulcata var. canadensis

= Circaea canadensis =

Plant species in the evening primrose family

Circaea canadensis, known as eastern enchanter's nightshade, Canada enchanter's nightshade, broad-leaved enchanter's nightshade, is a perennial herbaceous plant found in forests of eastern North America. It is very similar to its sister species, Circaea lutetiana, and was formerly considered conspecific (part of the same species).

== Taxonomy ==
Circaea canadensis was considered a variety of Circaea lutetiana by Carl Linnaeus in 1753. In 1765 the botanist John Hill published a description of it as a species creating its accepted name. It is classified in the genus Circaea within the Onagraceae family. According to Plants of the World Online it has two accepted subspecies

- Circaea canadensis subsp. canadensis
- Circaea canadensis subsp. quadrisulcata (Maxim.) Boufford

It has 13 synonyms of the species or one of its subspecies.

Table of Synonyms
Name	Year	Rank	Synonym of:	Notes
Circaea canadensis var. virginiana Fernald	1945	variety	subsp. canadensis	= het.
Circaea latifolia Hill	1756	species	subsp. canadensis	= het., opus utique oppr.
Circaea lutetiana subsp. canadensis (L.) Asch. & Magnus	1870	subspecies	C. canadensis	≡ hom.
Circaea lutetiana var. canadensis L.	1753	variety	C. canadensis	≡ hom.
Circaea lutetiana subsp. quadrisulcata (Maxim.) Asch. & Magnus	1870	subspecies	subsp. quadrisulcata	≡ hom.
Circaea lutetiana f. quadrisulcata Maxim.	1859	form	subsp. quadrisulcata	≡ hom.
Circaea maximowiczii (H.Lév.) H.Hara	1934	species	subsp. quadrisulcata	= het., nom. illeg.
Circaea maximowiczii var. viridicalyx H.Hara	1934	variety	subsp. quadrisulcata	= het.
Circaea maximowiczii f. viridicalyx (H.Hara) Kitag.	1939	form	subsp. quadrisulcata	= het.
Circaea mollis var. maximowiczii H.Lév.	1912	variety	subsp. quadrisulcata	= het.
Circaea quadrisulcata (Maxim.) Franch. & Sav.	1873	species	subsp. quadrisulcata	≡ hom.
Circaea quadrisulcata subsp. canadensis (L.) Á.Löve & D.Löve	1982	subspecies	C. canadensis	≡ hom.
Circaea quadrisulcata var. canadensis (L.) H.Hara	1939	variety	C. canadensis	≡ hom.
Notes: ≡ homotypic synonym; = heterotypic synonym

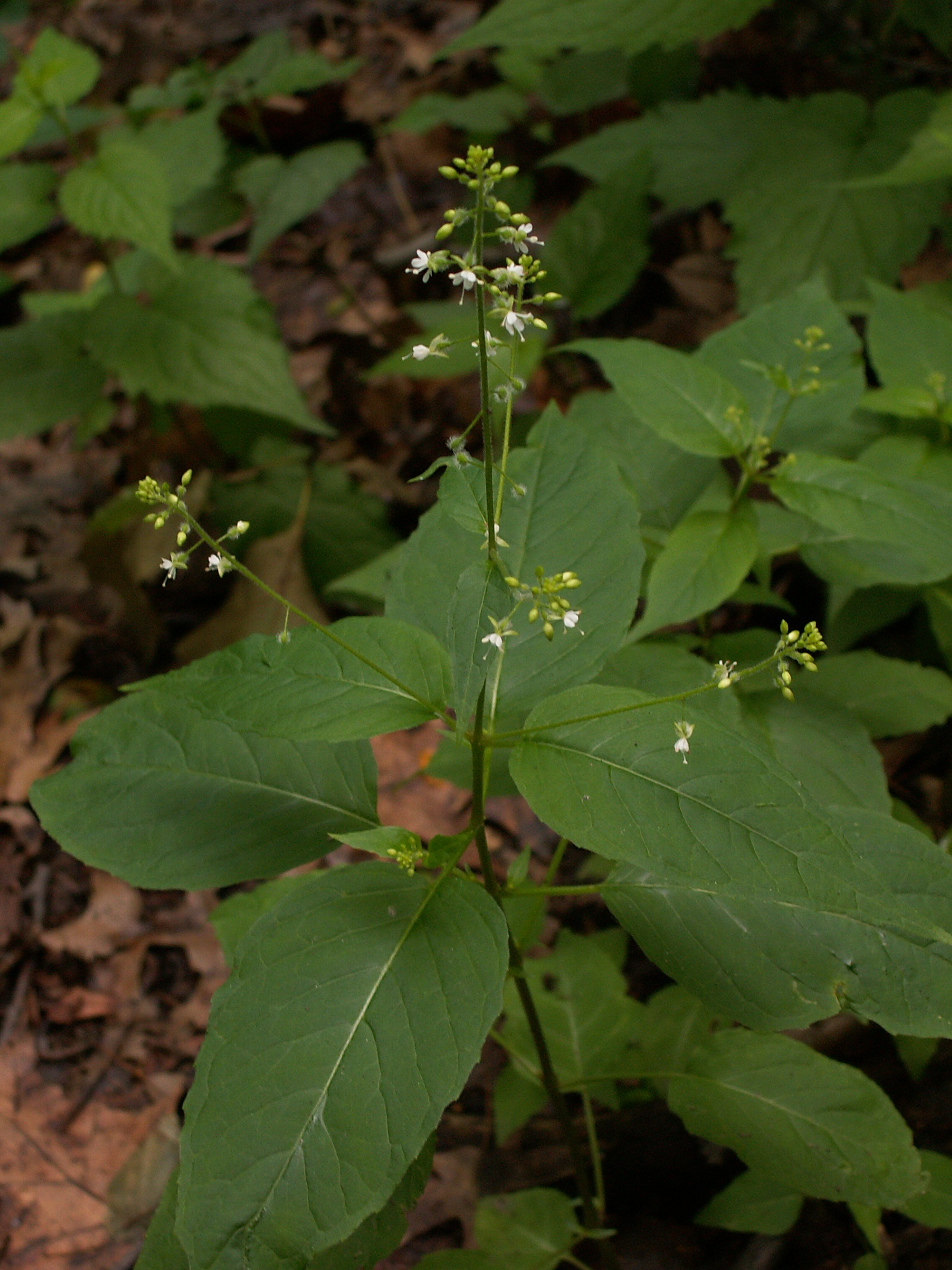
Growth form and flowers
