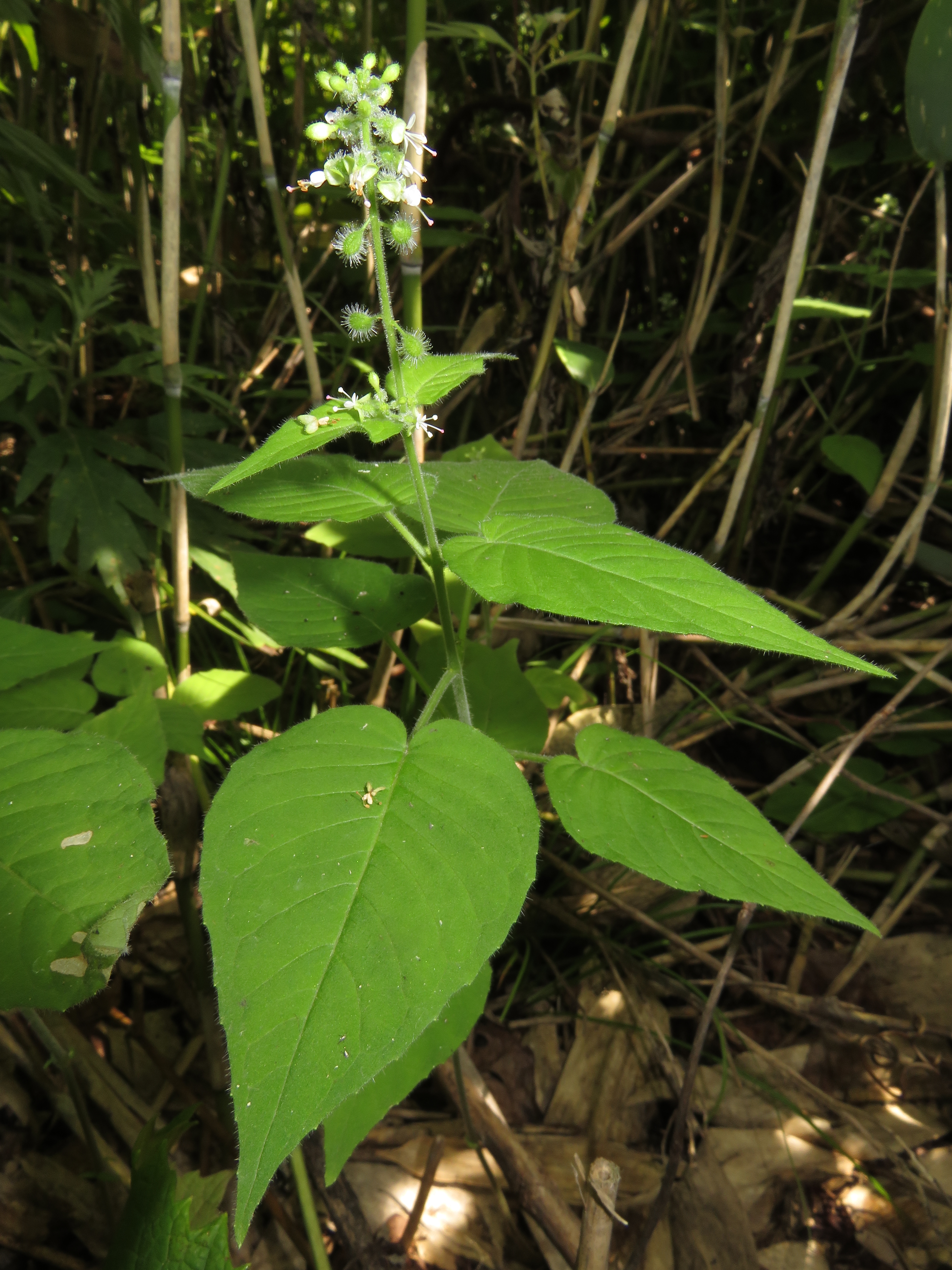

Scientific classification
- Kingdom: Plantae
- Clade: Tracheophytes
- Clade: Angiosperms
- Clade: Eudicots
- Clade: Rosids
- Order: Myrtales
- Family: Onagraceae
- Genus: Circaea
- Species: C. cordata

Binomial name
- Circaea cordata Royle

= Circaea cordata =

Species of flowering plant

Circaea cordata is a species of flowering plant in the family Onagraceae.
