= Cymbium coenyei =

Scientific classification
- Kingdom: Animalia
- Phylum: Mollusca
- Class: Gastropoda
- Subclass: Caenogastropoda
- Order: Neogastropoda
- Family: Volutidae
- Genus: Cymbium
- Species: C. coenyei

Binomial name
- Cymbium coenyei (Nolf, 2017)

Species of gastropod

Cymbium coenyei, is a species of sea snail, a marine gastropod mollusk in the family Volutidae.

== Etymology ==
The taxonomic designation Cymbium coenyei honors André Coenye, a Belgian navigating officer who served in Angolan waters from 1960 to 1973 before retiring. Coenye's significant contributions to the study of West African molluscan fauna include providing meticulously documented shells, thus enhancing our understanding of species distribution.

== Taxonomy ==
The differentiation of Cymbium coenyei from related species was initially debated, but through extensive study, it was determined to be a distinct species. Key characteristics include the position of the protoconch, the narrow adapical region, and the bluish-grey color of the adapical area. These features distinguish it from Cymbium patulum and Cymbium fragile.

== Description ==
The species' holotype was found off the mouth of the Congo River, near the lighthouse between Banana and Cabinda in the Democratic Republic of the Congo, at a depth of approximately 20 meters. It was trawled by Belgian fishermen in 1967. The holotype measures 121.23 mm.

All paratypes were collected from the same locality and are housed in the author's collection. These paratypes vary in size, with measurements ranging from 90 to 153 mm.

The shell of Cymbium coenyei is described as heavy and solid, with a slender outline and a straight outer lip. The protoconch is sunken into the apical cavity and covered by a brown callus. The body whorl exhibits a broad, weakly curved sutural ramp and a posterior shoulder ridge that is carinated and somewhat reflected outwards. The columella has three folds, occasionally with a fourth obscure plait, and is variably colored. The adapical part is bluish-grey, with a narrow and small adapical area. The interior of the aperture is light brown with streaks of grey, while the outer surface is greyish-brown. The siphonal notch is uniformly brown.

Cymbium coenyei has been previously illustrated in literature, albeit mislabeled as Cymbium patulum.

== Distribution ==
The species' geographic distribution is currently limited to the type locality, but it is speculated that more specimens may be found in other West African areas, as the species was often confused with Cymbium patulum in the past.
