= Callipara queketti =

Scientific classification
- Kingdom: Animalia
- Phylum: Mollusca
- Class: Gastropoda
- Subclass: Caenogastropoda
- Order: Neogastropoda
- Family: Volutidae
- Genus: Callipara
- Species: C. queketti

Binomial name
- Callipara queketti (Smith, 1901)

Species of gastropod

Callipara queketti is a species of sea snail, a marine gastropod mollusk in the family Volutidae, the volutes.
