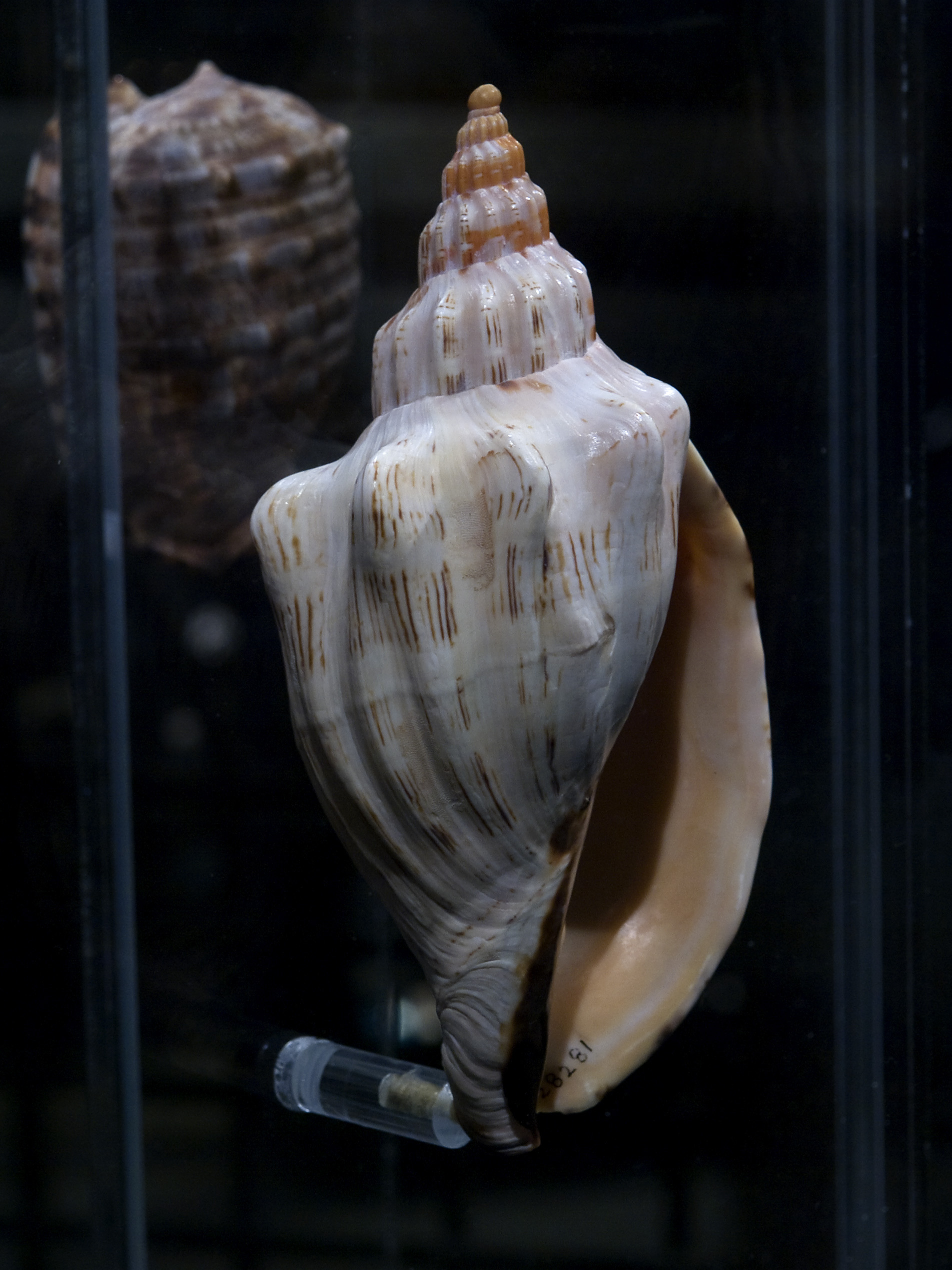

Scientific classification
- Kingdom: Animalia
- Phylum: Mollusca
- Class: Gastropoda
- Subclass: Caenogastropoda
- Order: Neogastropoda
- Family: Volutidae
- Genus: Callipara
- Species: C. festiva

Binomial name
- Callipara festiva (Lamarck, 1811)

Synonyms
- Callipara (Festilyria) festiva (Lamarck, 1811); Festilyria festiva (Lamarck, 1811); Voluta festiva Lamarck, 1811

= Callipara festiva =

Species of gastropod

Callipara festiva is a species of sea snail, a marine gastropod mollusk in the family Volutidae, the volutes.

== Distribution ==
This species occurs in the Indian Ocean off Somalia.
