= Nanomelon vossi =

Scientific classification
- Kingdom: Animalia
- Phylum: Mollusca
- Class: Gastropoda
- Subclass: Caenogastropoda
- Order: Neogastropoda
- Family: Volutidae
- Genus: Nanomelon
- Species: N. vossi

Binomial name
- Nanomelon vossi Leal & Rios, 1990

Species of gastropod

Nanomelon vossi is a species of sea snail, a marine gastropod mollusk in the family Volutidae, the volutes.
