= Cymbium senegalense =

Scientific classification
- Kingdom: Animalia
- Phylum: Mollusca
- Class: Gastropoda
- Subclass: Caenogastropoda
- Order: Neogastropoda
- Family: Volutidae
- Genus: Cymbium
- Species: C. senegalense

Binomial name
- Cymbium senegalense Marche-Marchad, 1978

Synonyms
- Cymbium tritonis senegalensis Marche-Marchad, 1978

Species of gastropod

Cymbium senegalense is a species of sea snail, a marine gastropod mollusc in the family Volutidae, the volutes.

== Distribution ==
This marine species occurs off Senegal.
