= Callipara aphrodite =

Scientific classification
- Kingdom: Animalia
- Phylum: Mollusca
- Class: Gastropoda
- Subclass: Caenogastropoda
- Order: Neogastropoda
- Family: Volutidae
- Genus: Callipara
- Species: C. aphrodite

Binomial name
- Callipara aphrodite (Bondarev, 1999)

Species of gastropod

Callipara aphrodite is a species of sea snail, a marine gastropod mollusk in the family Volutidae, the volutes.
