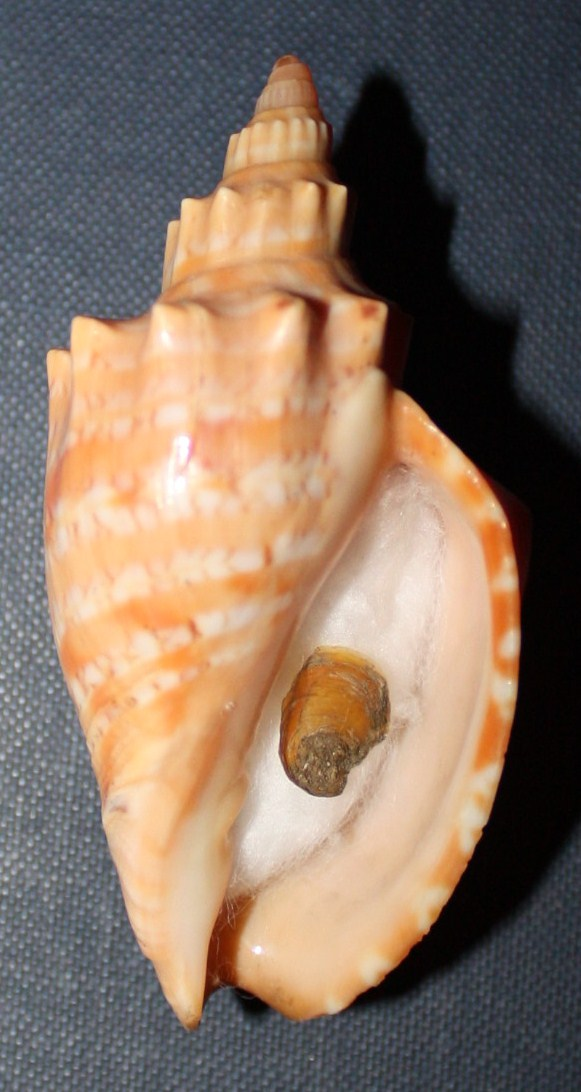

Scientific classification
- Kingdom: Animalia
- Phylum: Mollusca
- Class: Gastropoda
- Subclass: Caenogastropoda
- Order: Neogastropoda
- Family: Volutidae
- Genus: Callipara
- Species: C. ponsonbyi

Binomial name
- Callipara ponsonbyi (E.A. Smith, 1901)

Synonyms
- Callipara (Festilyria) ponsonbyi (E.A. Smith, 1901); Festilyria ponsonbyi (E. A. Smith, 1901); Lyria ponsonbyi (E. A. Smith, 1901); Voluta ponsonbyi E.A. Smith, 1901 (basionym)

= Callipara ponsonbyi =

Species of gastropod

Callipara ponsonbyi is a species of sea snail, a marine gastropod mollusk in the family Volutidae, the volutes.

== Ecology and behaviour ==
Like other volutids, C. ponsonbyi is likely predatory, feeding on smaller invertebrates. This is consistent with behaviour observed in its close relatives.

The habit of burying into sand/substrate might be a defense strategy, possibly helping avoid predators or ambush prey.

Due to its depth range and cryptic lifestyle, live encounters are rare and many specimens come from fish stomachs. This suggests that natural predation pressure (from fish) significantly impacts observed populations.
