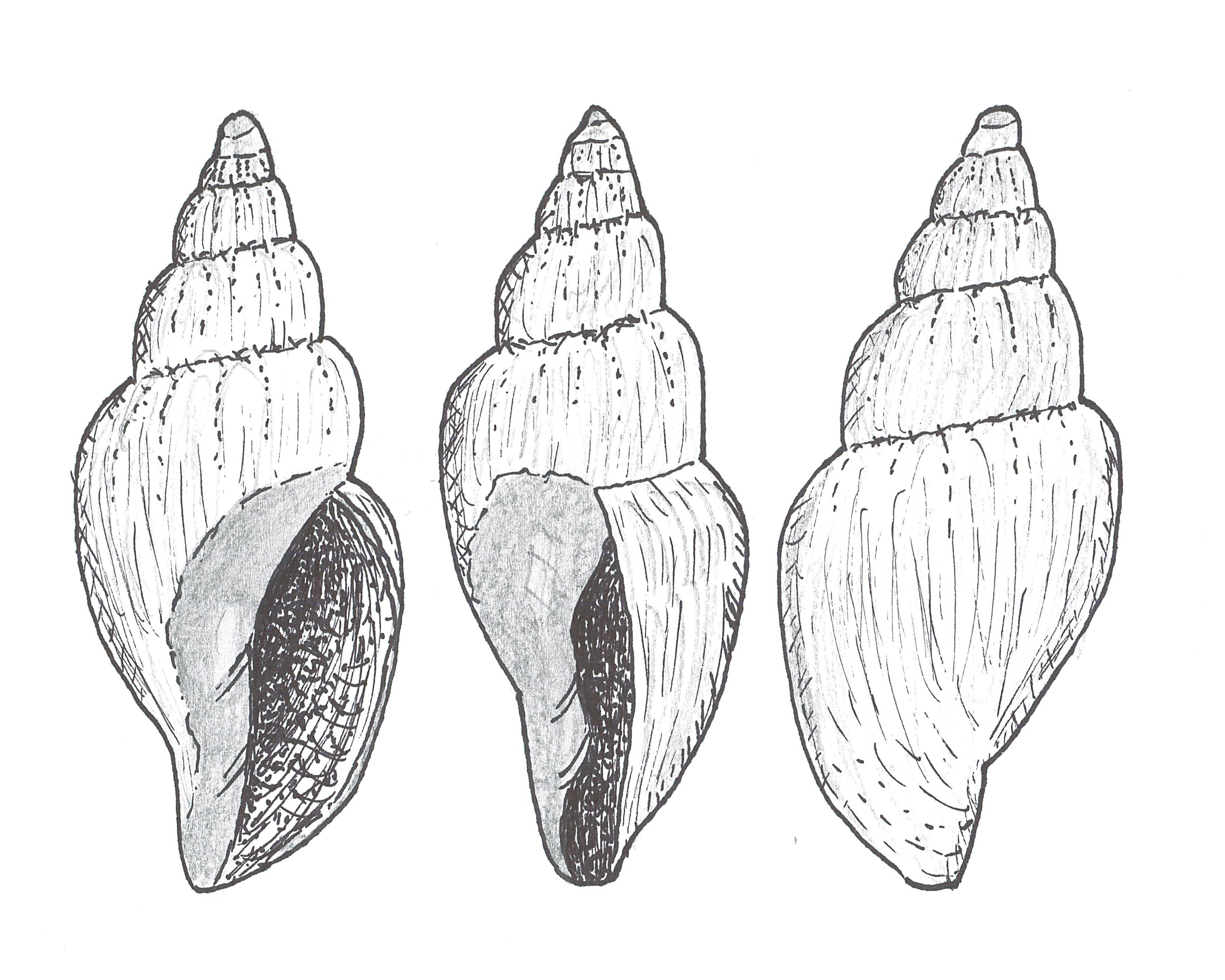
- Line drawings of Zygomelon zoidon Hawasewych & Marshall, 1995

Scientific classification
- Kingdom: Animalia
- Phylum: Mollusca
- Class: Gastropoda
- Subclass: Caenogastropoda
- Order: Neogastropoda
- Family: Volutidae
- Genus: Zygomelon
- Species: Z. zodion

Binomial name
- Zygomelon zodion Harasewych & Marshall, 1995

= Zygomelon zodion =

Species of gastropod

Zygomelon zodion is a species of sea snail, a marine gastropod mollusk in the family Volutidae, the volutes.
