= Minicymbiola corderoi =

Scientific classification
- Kingdom: Animalia
- Phylum: Mollusca
- Class: Gastropoda
- Subclass: Caenogastropoda
- Order: Neogastropoda
- Family: Volutidae
- Genus: Minicymbiola
- Species: M. corderoi

Binomial name
- Minicymbiola corderoi (Carcelles, 1953)

Species of gastropod

Minicymbiola corderoi is a species of sea snail, a marine gastropod mollusk in the family Volutidae, the volutes.
