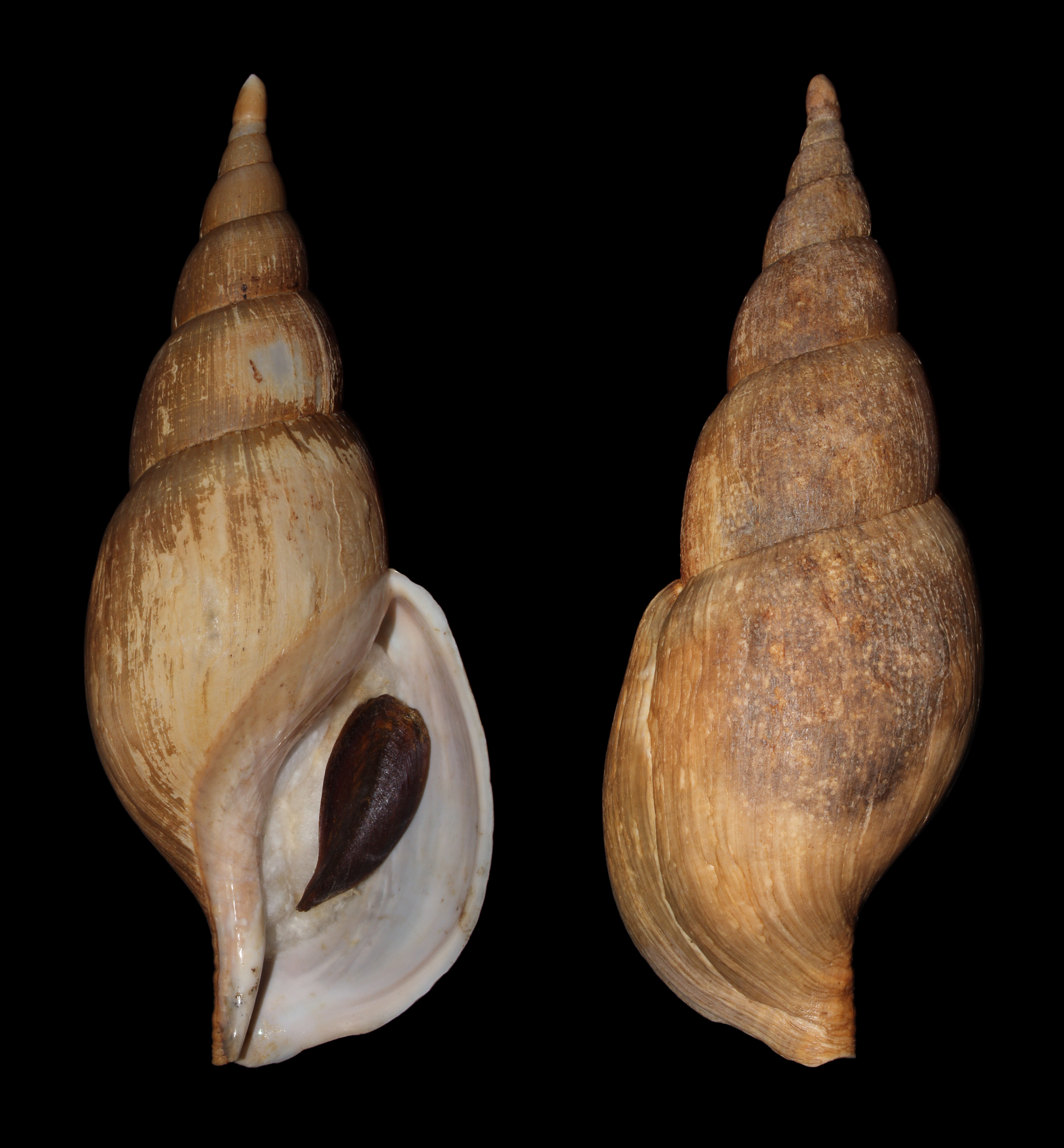
- A shell of Neptuneopsis gil

Scientific classification
- Kingdom: Animalia
- Phylum: Mollusca
- Class: Gastropoda
- Subclass: Caenogastropoda
- Order: Neogastropoda
- Family: Volutidae
- Genus: Neptuneopsis
- Species: N. gilchristi

Binomial name
- Neptuneopsis gilchristi G.B. Sowerby III, 1898

= Neptuneopsis gilchristi =

Species of gastropod

Neptuneopsis gilchristi, common name the Gilchrist's volute, is a species of sea snail, a marine gastropod mollusk in the family Volutidae, the volutes.

== Description ==
The length attains 240 mm, but is usually between 120 mm and 150 mm.

The shell is large and light. The spire is high with convex ( outward) whorls and indented suture. The sculpture consists of very fine, dense spiral threads. The aperture is wide, somewhat flaring and tapering to a short siphonal canal. The inner lip lacks pleats, but shows a thin, smooth callus glaze. The protoconch (apex) is bud-shaped and disproportionately large. The operculum is smaller than the aperture.

The shell is pale buff to light orange-brown, covered by a thin, matte olive-brown periostracum. Some specimens display faint, diffuse paler spiral bands.

== Distribution ==
This marine species is endemic to South Africa and occurs off the West and South coast, Agulhas Bank, at depths between 60 m and 500 m.
