= Provocator alabastrina =

Scientific classification
- Kingdom: Animalia
- Phylum: Mollusca
- Class: Gastropoda
- Subclass: Caenogastropoda
- Order: Neogastropoda
- Family: Volutidae
- Genus: Provocator
- Species: P. alabastrina

Binomial name
- Provocator alabastrina (Watson, 1882)

Species of gastropod

Provocator alabastrina is a species of sea snail, a marine gastropod mollusk in the family Volutidae, the volutes.
