= Provocator corderoi =

Scientific classification
- Kingdom: Animalia
- Phylum: Mollusca
- Class: Gastropoda
- Subclass: Caenogastropoda
- Order: Neogastropoda
- Family: Volutidae
- Genus: Provocator
- Species: P. corderoi

Binomial name
- Provocator corderoi Carcelles, 1947

Species of gastropod

Provocator corderoi is a species of sea snail, a marine gastropod mollusk in the family Volutidae, the volutes.

== Description ==
Shell size 40-45 mm.

== Distribution ==
Southern Atlantic Ocean: Falkland Islands at 400-500 metres depth.
