= Provocator pulcher =

Scientific classification
- Kingdom: Animalia
- Phylum: Mollusca
- Class: Gastropoda
- Subclass: Caenogastropoda
- Order: Neogastropoda
- Family: Volutidae
- Genus: Provocator
- Species: P. pulcher

Binomial name
- Provocator pulcher Watson, 1882

Synonyms
- Provocator provocator Sowerby III, 1887

Species of gastropod

Provocator pulcher is a species of sea snail, a marine gastropod mollusk in the family Volutidae, the volutes.

== Description ==
This species attains a size of 97 mm.

== Distribution ==
Deep water, 150 fathoms: Southern Indian Ocean: Kerguelen Islands.
