= Leptoscapha crassilabrum =

Scientific classification
- Kingdom: Animalia
- Phylum: Mollusca
- Class: Gastropoda
- Subclass: Caenogastropoda
- Order: Neogastropoda
- Family: Volutidae
- Genus: Leptoscapha
- Species: L. crassilabrum

Binomial name
- Leptoscapha crassilabrum (Tate, 1889)

Species of gastropod

Leptoscapha crassilabrum is a species of sea snail, a marine gastropod mollusc in the family Volutidae, the volutes.
