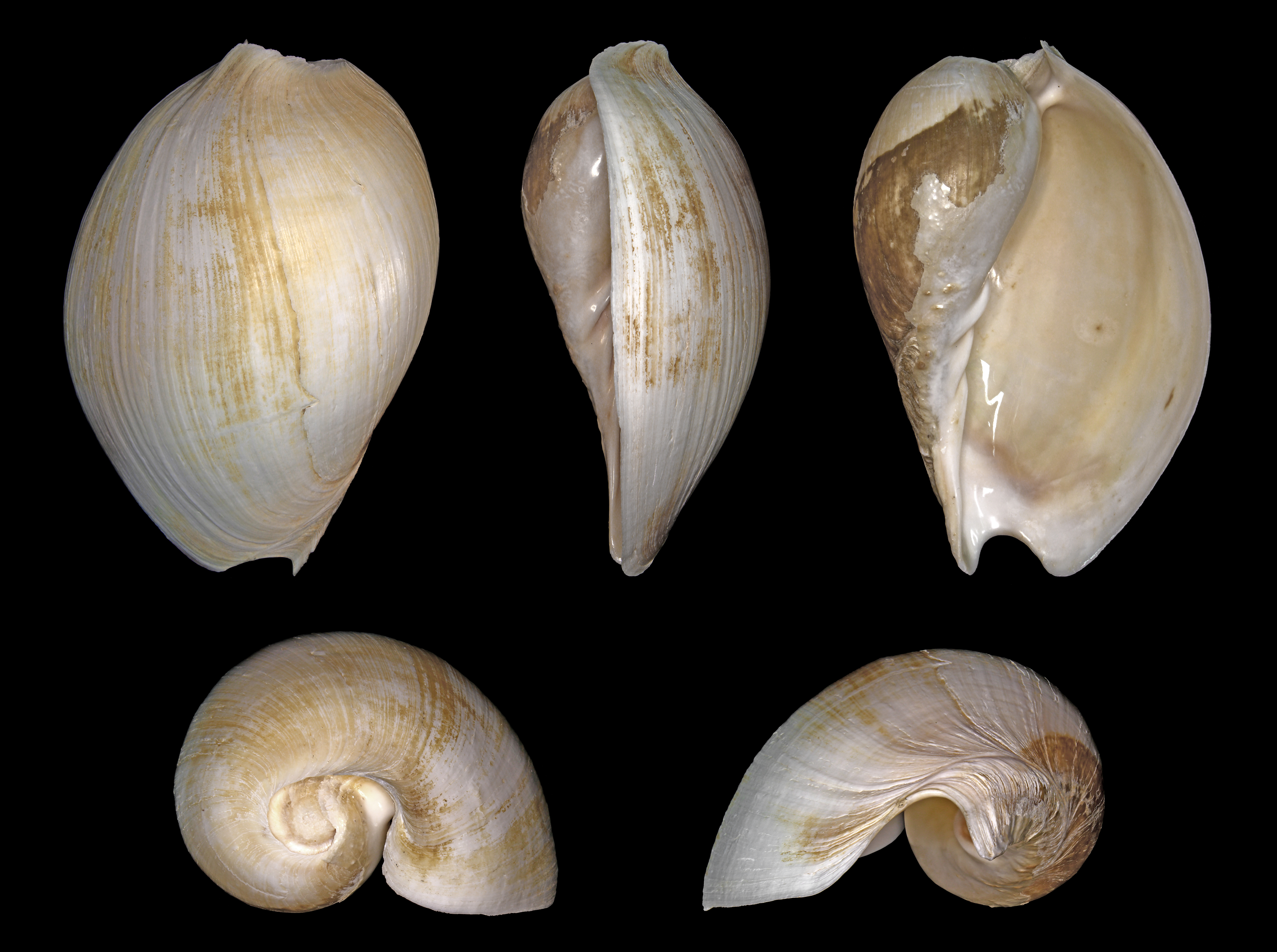

Scientific classification
- Kingdom: Animalia
- Phylum: Mollusca
- Class: Gastropoda
- Subclass: Caenogastropoda
- Order: Neogastropoda
- Family: Volutidae
- Genus: Cymbium
- Species: C. tritonis

Binomial name
- Cymbium tritonis (Broderip, 1830)

Synonyms
- Cymba tritonis Broderip, 1830; Cymbium caputvelatum Bruynseels, 1975; Yetus marocanus Pallary, 1930

= Cymbium tritonis =

Species of gastropod

Cymbium tritonis is a species of sea snail, a marine gastropod mollusc in the family Volutidae, the volutes.

== Distribution ==
This marine species is found in the European waters of the North Atlantic Ocean. and off Morocco.
