= Miomelon philippiana =

Scientific classification
- Kingdom: Animalia
- Phylum: Mollusca
- Class: Gastropoda
- Subclass: Caenogastropoda
- Order: Neogastropoda
- Family: Volutidae
- Genus: Miomelon
- Species: M. philippiana

Binomial name
- Miomelon philippiana (Dall, 1890)

Species of gastropod

Miomelon philippiana is a species of sea snail, a marine gastropod mollusk in the family Volutidae, the volutes.
