= Callipara bullatiana =

Scientific classification
- Kingdom: Animalia
- Phylum: Mollusca
- Class: Gastropoda
- Subclass: Caenogastropoda
- Order: Neogastropoda
- Family: Volutidae
- Genus: Callipara
- Species: C. bullatiana

Binomial name
- Callipara bullatiana (Weaver & du Pont, 1967)

Synonyms
- Voluta bullata Swainson, 1829

Species of gastropod

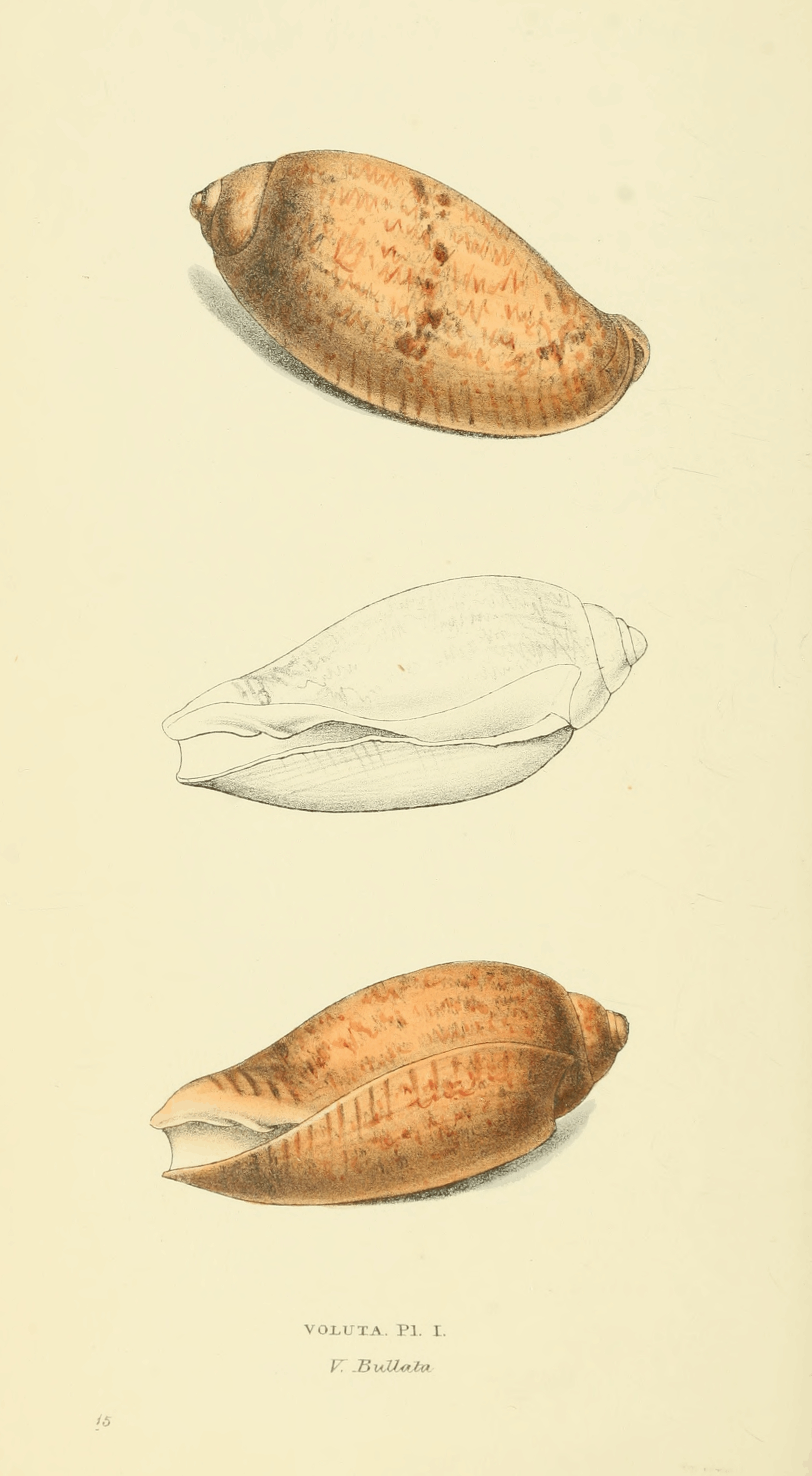

Callipara bullatiana is a species of sea snail, a marine gastropod mollusk in the family Volutidae, the volutes.

== Description ==
Average shell length of mature specimens is around 55 mm, but extremes can be as small as 40 mm, and as large as 80 mm.

== Distribution ==
Endemic to South Africa, ranging from central Algulhas Bank to around Port Elizabeth.
