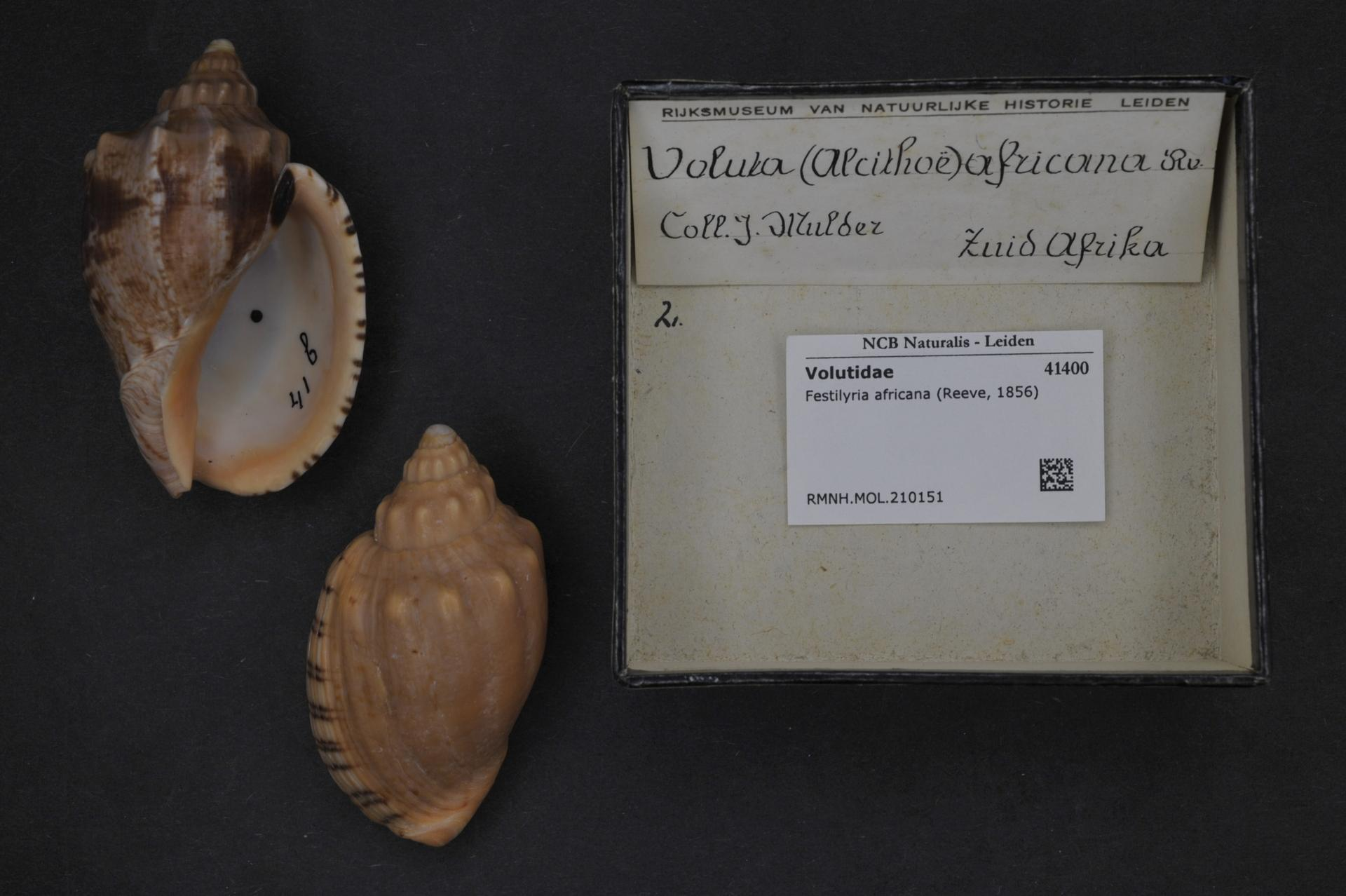

Scientific classification
- Kingdom: Animalia
- Phylum: Mollusca
- Class: Gastropoda
- Subclass: Caenogastropoda
- Order: Neogastropoda
- Family: Volutidae
- Genus: Callipara
- Species: C. africana

Binomial name
- Callipara africana (Reeve, 1856)

Synonyms
- Callipara (Callipara) africana (Reeve, 1856); Festilyria africana (Reeve, 1856); Lyria africana (Reeve, 1856); Voluta africana Reeve, 1856 (original description); Voluta africana f. beckeri Turton, 1932; Voluta africana f. ponderosa Turton, 1932; Voluta africana f. rietensis Turton, 1932

= Callipara africana =

Species of gastropod

Callipara africana is a species of sea snail, a marine gastropod mollusk in the family Volutidae, the volutes.

Subspecies

- Callipara africana africana (Reeve, 1856)
- Callipara africana pumila Bail & Aiken, 2017

== Distribution ==
This marine species occurs off South Africa.
