= Callipara duponti =

Scientific classification
- Kingdom: Animalia
- Phylum: Mollusca
- Class: Gastropoda
- Subclass: Caenogastropoda
- Order: Neogastropoda
- Family: Volutidae
- Genus: Callipara
- Species: C. duponti

Binomial name
- Callipara duponti (Weaver, 1968)

Synonyms
- Callipara (Festilyria) duponti (Weaver, 1968); Festilyria duponti Weaver, 1968

Species of gastropod

Callipara duponti is a species of sea snail, a marine gastropod mollusk in the family Volutidae, the volutes.

== Distribution ==
This species occurs in the Indian Ocean off Mozambique.
