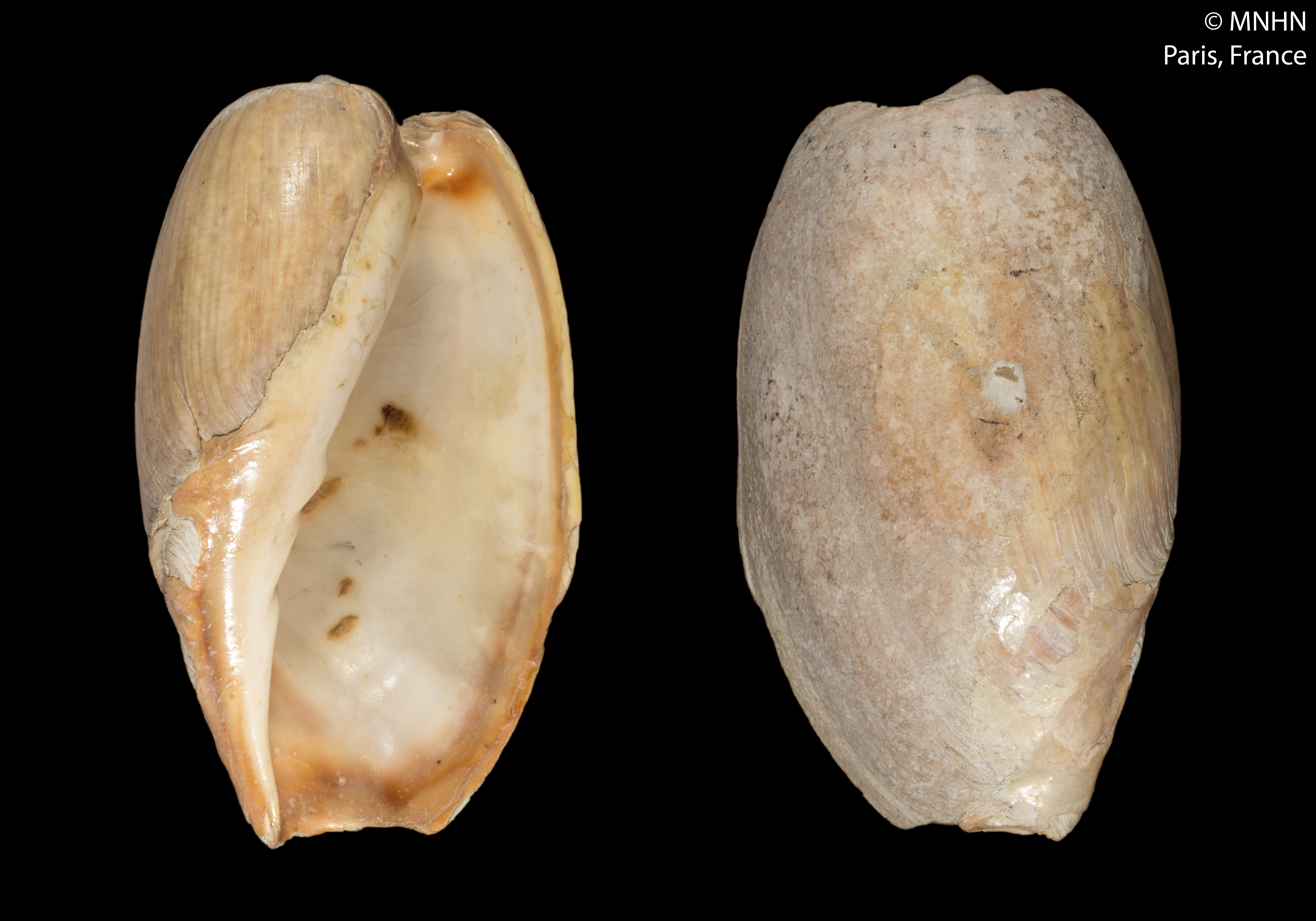

Scientific classification
- Kingdom: Animalia
- Phylum: Mollusca
- Class: Gastropoda
- Subclass: Caenogastropoda
- Order: Neogastropoda
- Family: Volutidae
- Genus: Cymbium
- Species: C. cucumis

Binomial name
- Cymbium cucumis Röding, 1798

Synonyms
- Cymbium rubiginosum (Lowe, 1861); Cymbium rubiginosum (Swainson, 1822); Cymbium rubiginosum angulata Lowe, 1861; Cymbium rubiginosum incurva Lowe, 1861; Cymbium rubiginosum var. angulata R. T. Lowe, 1861; Cymbium rubiginosum var. incurva R. T. Lowe, 1861; Voluta rubiginosa Swainson, 1821; Yetus marocanus var. dilatata Pallary, 1930; Yetus rubiginosus (Swainson, 1822); Yetus rubiginosus var. sacella Dollfus, 1911

= Cymbium cucumis =

Species of gastropod

Cymbium cucumis, commonly known as the cucumber volute, is a species of sea snail, a marine gastropod mollusk in the family Volutidae, the volutes.

== Distribution ==
This species occurs in the Atlantic Ocean of Morocco.
