= Cymbium gracile =

Scientific classification
- Kingdom: Animalia
- Phylum: Mollusca
- Class: Gastropoda
- Subclass: Caenogastropoda
- Order: Neogastropoda
- Family: Volutidae
- Genus: Cymbium
- Species: C. gracile

Binomial name
- Cymbium gracile (Broderip, 1830)

Species of gastropod

Cymbium gracile is a species of sea snail, a marine gastropod mollusc in the family Volutidae, the volutes. Its class is Gastropoda Orthogastropoda.

== Description ==
Shell size 80-90 mm.

== Distribution ==
West coast of Africa, in 30-35 metres depth
