= Nanomelon viperinus =

Scientific classification
- Kingdom: Animalia
- Phylum: Mollusca
- Class: Gastropoda
- Subclass: Caenogastropoda
- Order: Neogastropoda
- Family: Volutidae
- Genus: Nanomelon
- Species: N. viperinus

Binomial name
- Nanomelon viperinus Leal & Bouchet, 1989

Species of gastropod

Nanomelon viperinus is a species of sea snail, a marine gastropod mollusk in the family Volutidae, the volutes.
