= Miomelon alarconi =

Scientific classification
- Kingdom: Animalia
- Phylum: Mollusca
- Class: Gastropoda
- Subclass: Caenogastropoda
- Order: Neogastropoda
- Family: Volutidae
- Genus: Miomelon
- Species: M. alarconi

Binomial name
- Miomelon alarconi Stuardo & Villas, 1974

Species of gastropod

Miomelon alarconi, commonly known as the Alarcon volute is a species of sea snail, a marine gastropod mollusk in the family Volutidae, the volutes.

== Description ==
This deepwater species attains a size of 65–90 mm.

== Distribution ==
500 metres depth, off Chile.
