= Miomelon turnerae =

Scientific classification
- Kingdom: Animalia
- Phylum: Mollusca
- Class: Gastropoda
- Subclass: Caenogastropoda
- Order: Neogastropoda
- Family: Volutidae
- Genus: Miomelon
- Species: M. turnerae

Binomial name
- Miomelon turnerae Dell, 1990

Species of gastropod

Miomelon turnerae is a species of sea snail, a marine gastropod mollusk in the family Volutidae, the volutes.
