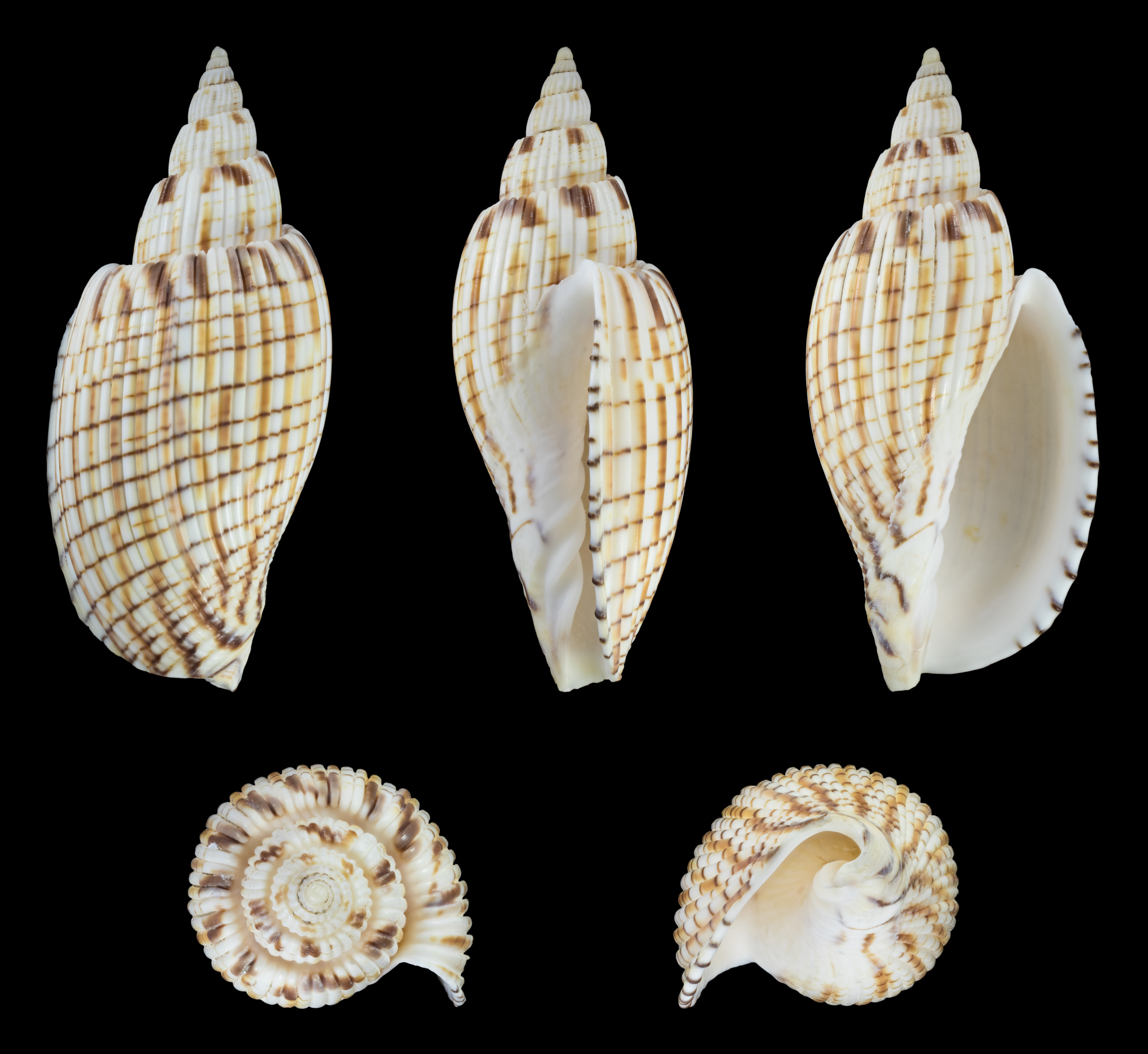

Scientific classification
- Kingdom: Animalia
- Phylum: Mollusca
- Class: Gastropoda
- Subclass: Caenogastropoda
- Order: Neogastropoda
- Family: Volutidae
- Genus: Callipara
- Species: C. kurodai

Binomial name
- Callipara kurodai (Kawamura, 1964)

= Callipara kurodai =

Species of gastropod

Callipara kurodai or Kuroda's Volute is a species of sea snail, a marine gastropod mollusk in the family Volutidae, the volutes. It was discovered in 1964 by trawling at depths of 2,000 feet (610 metres) in the South China Sea. The difficulty in acquiring shell samples before the proliferation of trawling made it historically in-demand among shell collectors.

== Description ==
The shell varies from 6 to 9 cm in length, unlike many other volutes, the outer shell surface is axially ribbed, as opposed to smooth.

== Distribution ==
It is primarily found at deep depths in the South China Sea, off the coasts of Vietnam and China.
