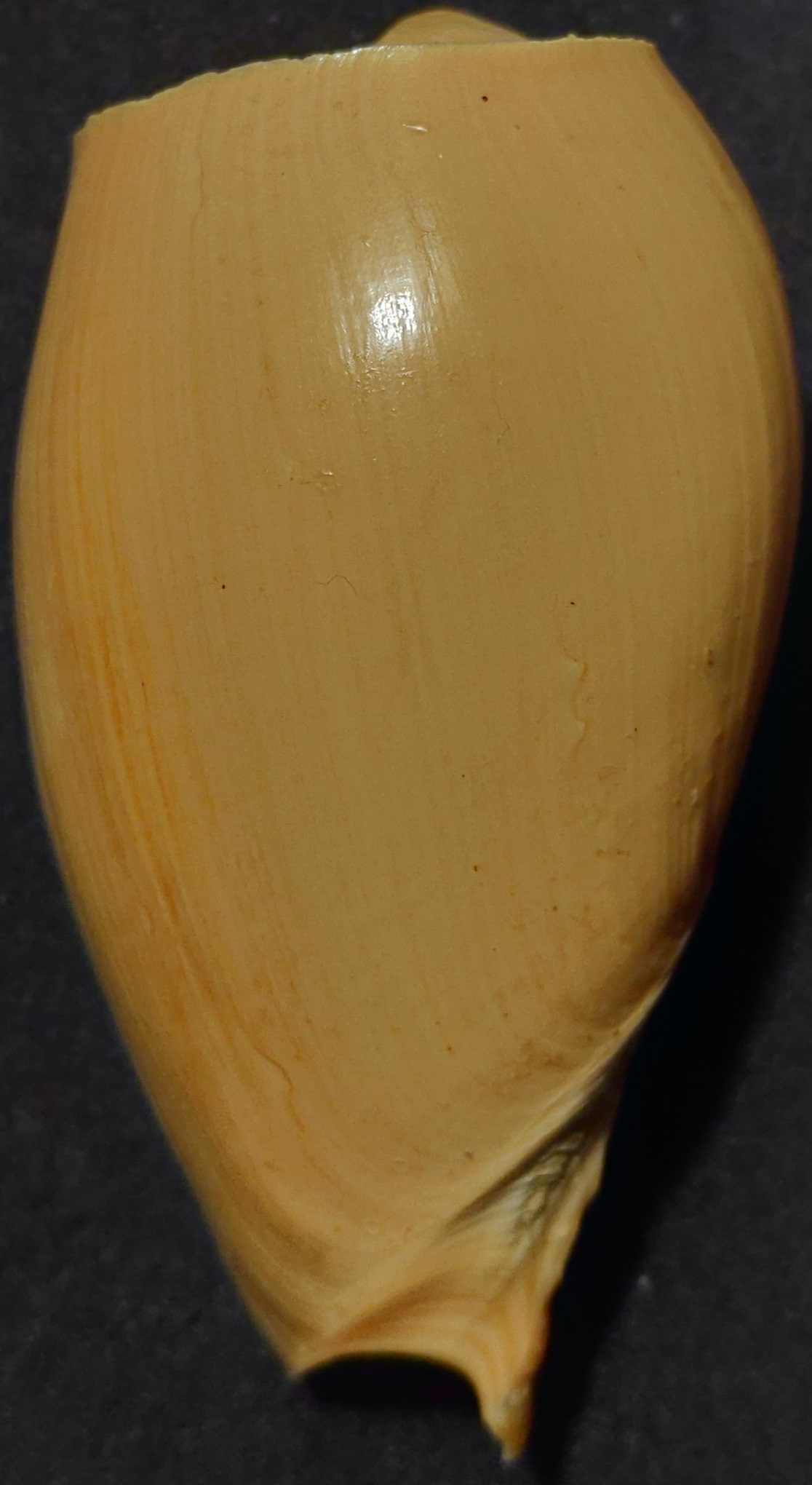

Scientific classification
- Kingdom: Animalia
- Phylum: Mollusca
- Class: Gastropoda
- Subclass: Caenogastropoda
- Order: Neogastropoda
- Family: Volutidae
- Genus: Cymbium
- Species: C. souliei

Binomial name
- Cymbium souliei Marche-Marchad, 1974

= Cymbium souliei =

Species of gastropod

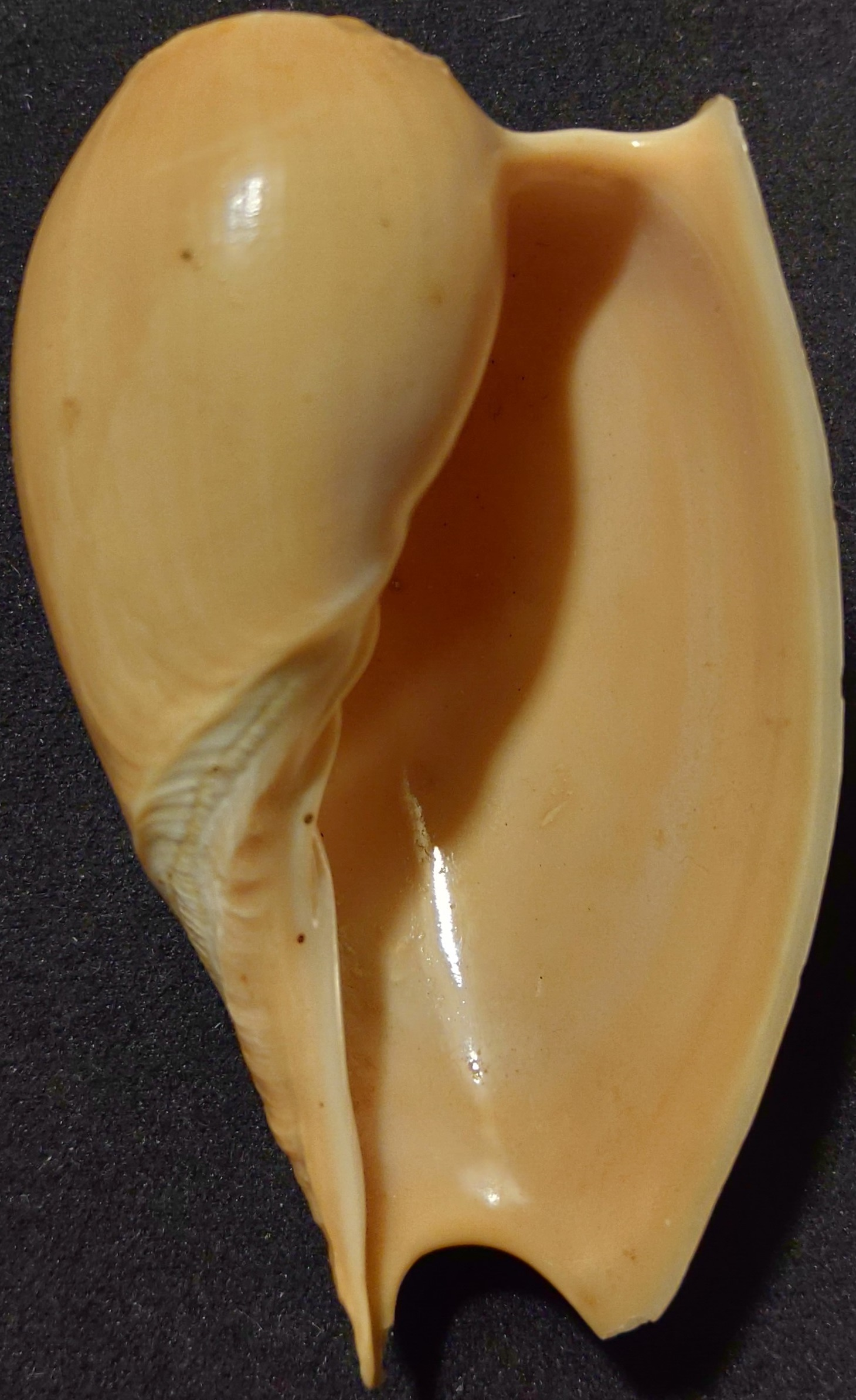

Cymbium souliei, commonly known as the Soulie's volute, is a species of sea snail, a marine gastropod mollusc in the family Volutidae, the volutes.

== Distribution ==
This marine species occurs off the Ivory Coast.
