= Cymbium =

Cymbium may refer to:

- Cymbium, a small drinking-vessel used by ancient Greeks
- Cymbium, feature of the palpal bulb of a male spider's pedipalp
- Cymbium (gastropod), a genus of sea snails
