= Notopeplum annulatum =

Scientific classification
- Kingdom: Animalia
- Phylum: Mollusca
- Class: Gastropoda
- Subclass: Caenogastropoda
- Order: Neogastropoda
- Family: Volutidae
- Genus: Notopeplum
- Species: N. annulatum

Binomial name
- Notopeplum annulatum Wilson, 1972

Species of gastropod

Notopeplum annulatum is a species of sea snail, a marine gastropod mollusk in the family Volutidae, the volutes.
