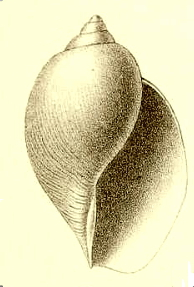
- Original image of a shell of Harpovoluta charcoti

Scientific classification
- Kingdom: Animalia
- Phylum: Mollusca
- Class: Gastropoda
- Subclass: Caenogastropoda
- Order: Neogastropoda
- Family: Volutidae
- Genus: Harpovoluta
- Species: H. charcoti

Binomial name
- Harpovoluta charcoti (Lamy, 1910)

Synonyms
- Buccinum charcoti Lamy, 1910 (original combination); Harpovoluta vanhoeffeni Thiele, 1912; Harpovoluta vanhoeffeni var. striatula Thiele, 1912

= Harpovoluta charcoti =

Species of gastropod

Harpovoluta charcoti is a species of sea snail, a marine gastropod mollusk in the family Volutidae, the volutes.

== Description ==
The size of the shell varies between 25 mm and 75 mm.

== Distribution ==
Harpovoluta charcoti is widely found in and around Antarctica/sub-Antarctic or Southern Ocean.
