= Provocator palliatus =

Scientific classification
- Kingdom: Animalia
- Phylum: Mollusca
- Class: Gastropoda
- Subclass: Caenogastropoda
- Order: Neogastropoda
- Family: Volutidae
- Genus: Provocator
- Species: P. palliates

Binomial name
- Provocator palliates (Kaiser, 1977)

Species of gastropod

Provocator palliates is a species of sea snail, a marine gastropod mollusk in the family Volutidae, the volutes.

== Description ==
Shell size 90-110 mm.
