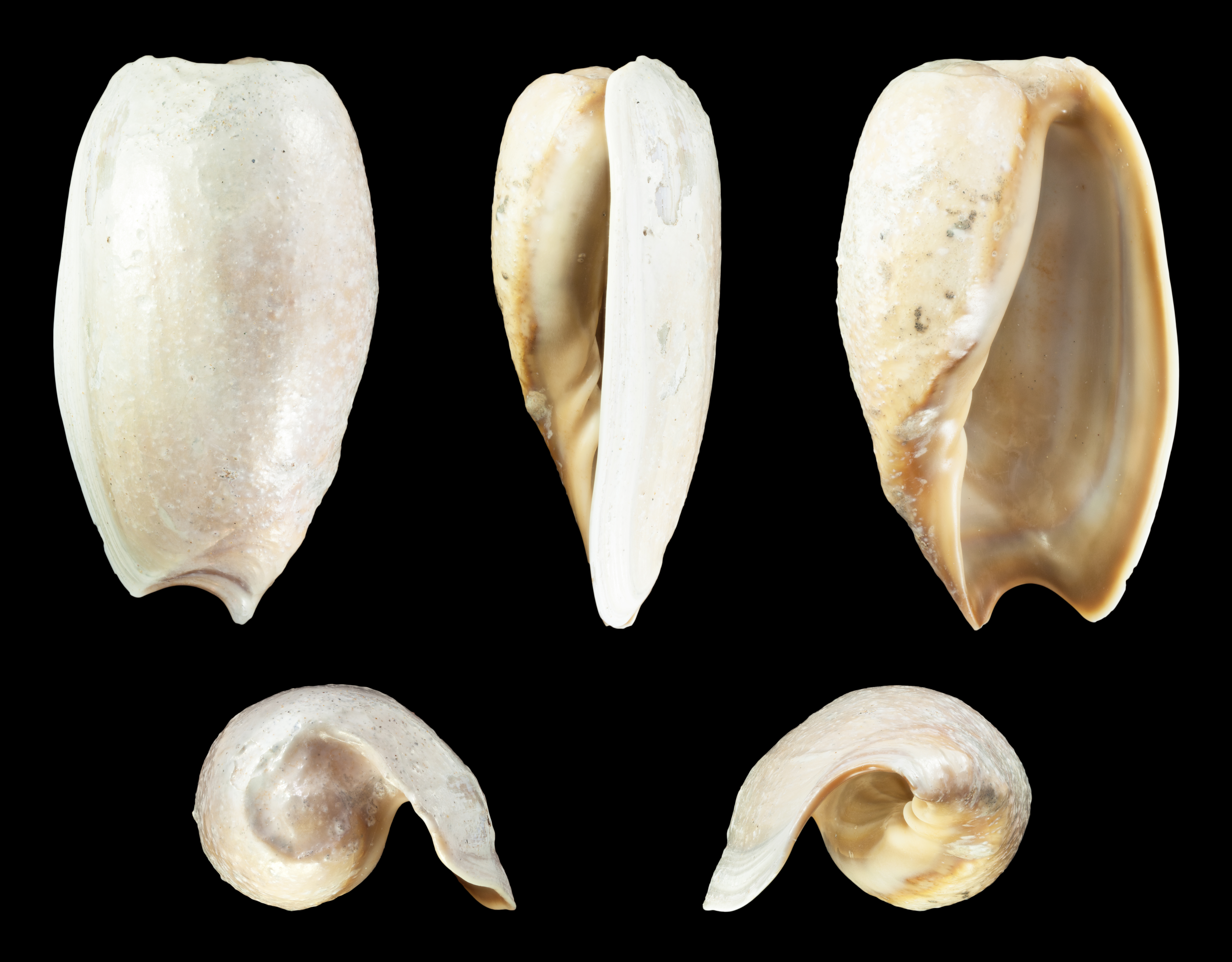

Scientific classification
- Kingdom: Animalia
- Phylum: Mollusca
- Class: Gastropoda
- Subclass: Caenogastropoda
- Order: Neogastropoda
- Family: Volutidae
- Genus: Cymbium
- Species: C. pachyus

Binomial name
- Cymbium pachyus (Pallary, 1930)

Synonyms
- Yetus pachyus Pallary, 1930

= Cymbium pachyus =

Species of gastropod

Cymbium pachyus, commonly known as the dilated baler volute, is a species of sea snail, a marine gastropod mollusc in the family Volutidae, the volutes.

== Distribution ==
This marine species occurs off Cameroun.
