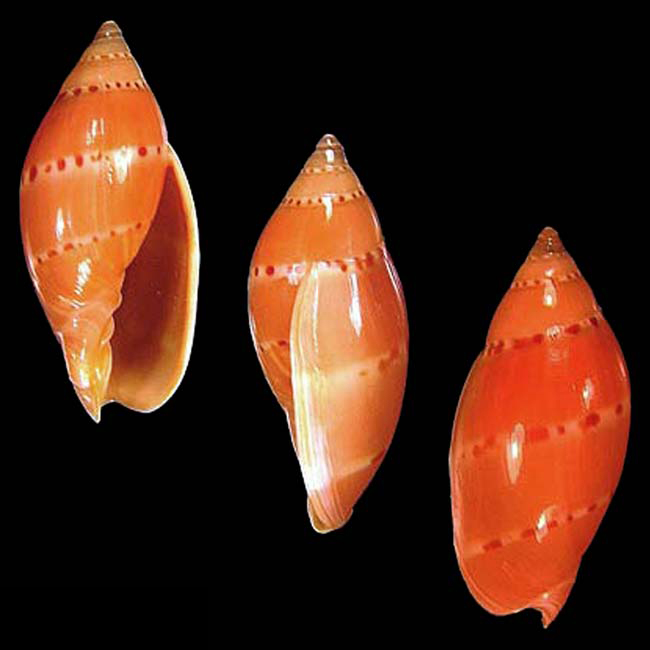

Scientific classification
- Kingdom: Animalia
- Phylum: Mollusca
- Class: Gastropoda
- Subclass: Caenogastropoda
- Order: Neogastropoda
- Family: Volutidae
- Genus: Notopeplum
- Species: N. cossignanii

Binomial name
- Notopeplum cossignanii Poppe, 1999

= Notopeplum cossignanii =

Species of gastropod

Notopeplum cossignanii is a species of sea snail, a marine gastropod mollusc in the family Volutidae, the volutes.
