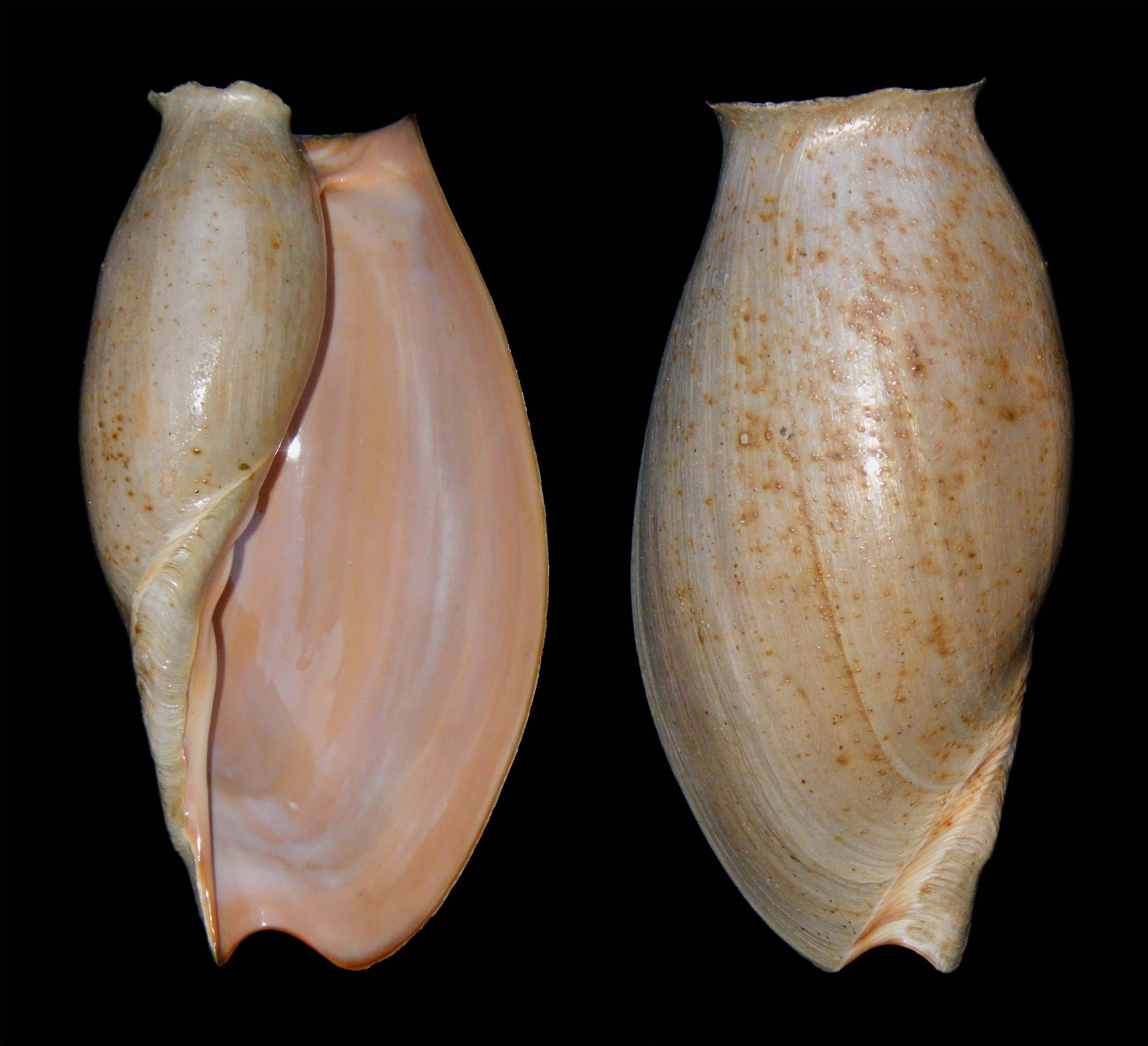
- Shell of Cymbium glans

Scientific classification
- Kingdom: Animalia
- Phylum: Mollusca
- Class: Gastropoda
- Subclass: Caenogastropoda
- Order: Neogastropoda
- Family: Volutidae
- Genus: Cymbium
- Species: C. glans

Binomial name
- Cymbium glans (Gmelin, 1791)

Synonyms
- Voluta proboscidale Lamarck, 1811

= Cymbium glans =

Species of gastropod

Cymbium glans, commonly known as the elephant's snout volute, is a species of sea snail, a marine gastropod mollusc in the family Volutidae, the volutes.
