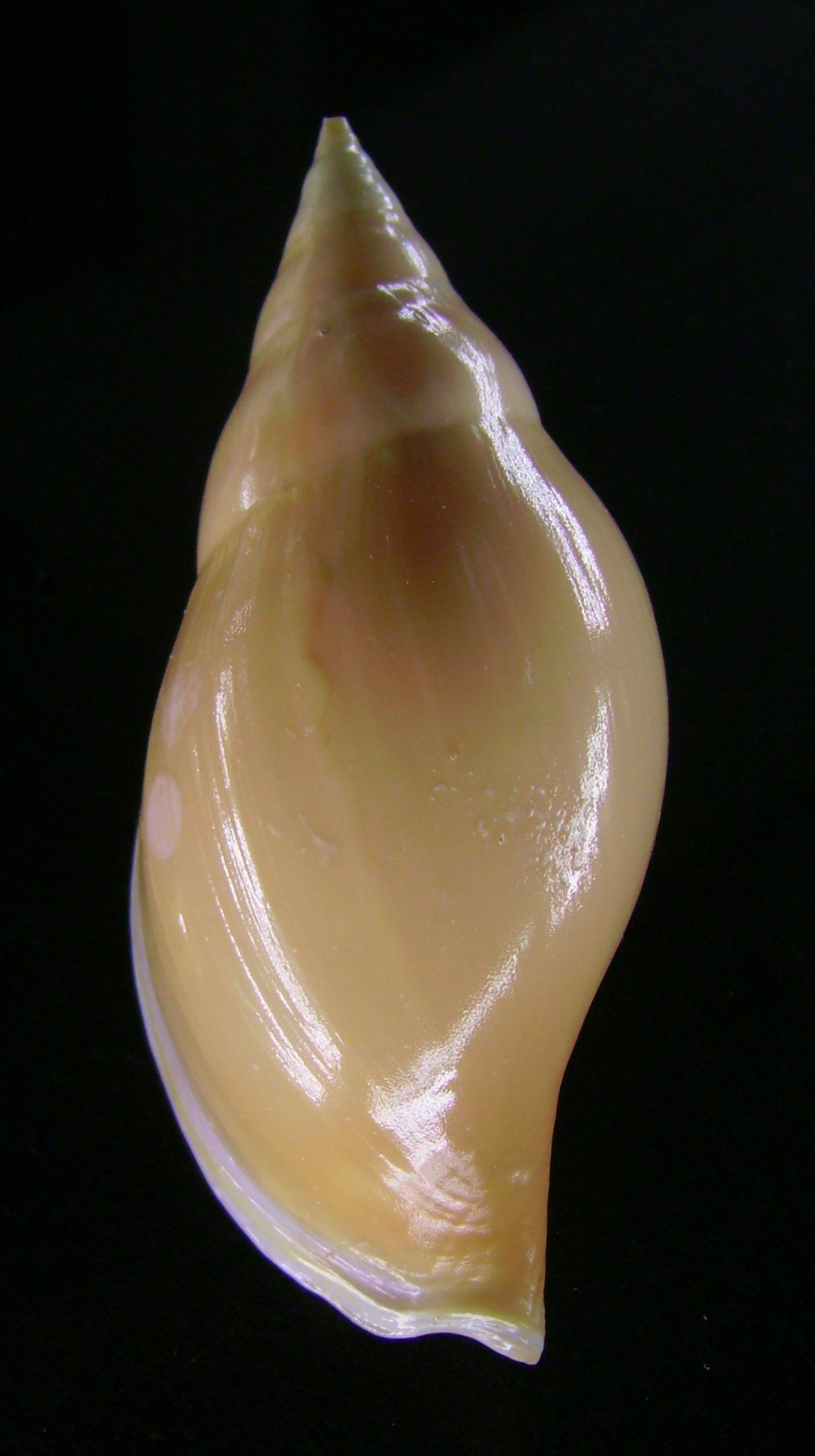
- The golden volute (Provocator mirabilis)

Scientific classification
- Kingdom: Animalia
- Phylum: Mollusca
- Class: Gastropoda
- Subclass: Caenogastropoda
- Order: Neogastropoda
- Family: Volutidae
- Subfamily: Cymbiinae
- Tribe: Zidonini
- Genus: Provocator; Watson, 1882

Synonyms
- Guivillea Watson, 1886; Iredalina Finlay, 1926; Pseudocymbium Cossman, 1899; Wyvillea Watson, 1882

= Provocator (gastropod) =

Genus of gastropods

Provocator is a genus of sea snails, marine gastropod mollusks in the family Volutidae.

== Species ==
Species within the genus Provocator include:

- Provocator alabastrina (Watson, 1882)
- Provocator corderoi Carcelles, 1947
- Provocator mirabilis (Finlay, 1926)
- Provocator palliata (Kaiser, 1977)
- Provocator pulcher Watson, 1882
