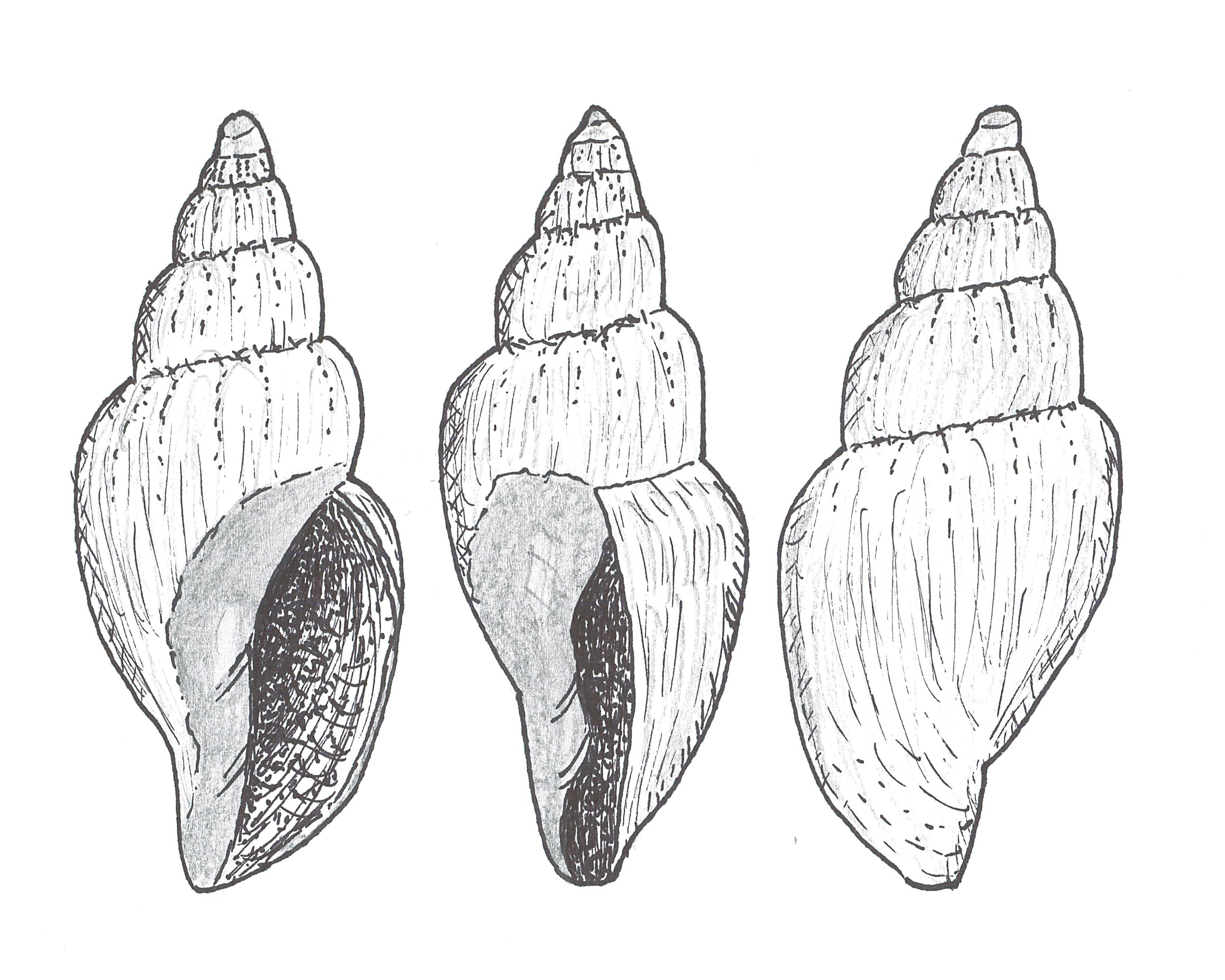
- Zygomelon zodion

Scientific classification
- Kingdom: Animalia
- Phylum: Mollusca
- Class: Gastropoda
- Subclass: Caenogastropoda
- Order: Neogastropoda
- Family: Volutidae
- Subfamily: Cymbiinae
- Genus: Zygomelon; Harasewych & Marshall, 1995

= Zygomelon =

Genus of gastropods

Zygomelon is a genus of sea snails, marine gastropod mollusks in the family Volutidae.

== Species ==
Species within the genus Zygomelon include:

- Zygomelon zodion Harasewych & Marshall, 1995
