= Notopeplum =

Scientific classification
- Kingdom: Animalia
- Phylum: Mollusca
- Class: Gastropoda
- Subclass: Caenogastropoda
- Order: Neogastropoda
- Family: Volutidae
- Tribe: Livoniini
- Genus: Notopeplum; Finlay, 1927

Genus of gastropods

Notopeplum is a genus of sea snails, marine gastropod mollusks in the family Volutidae.

== Species ==
Species within the genus Notopeplum include:

- Notopeplum annulatum Wilson, 1972
- Notopeplum cossignanii Poppe, 1999
- Notopeplum translucidum (Verco, 1896)
