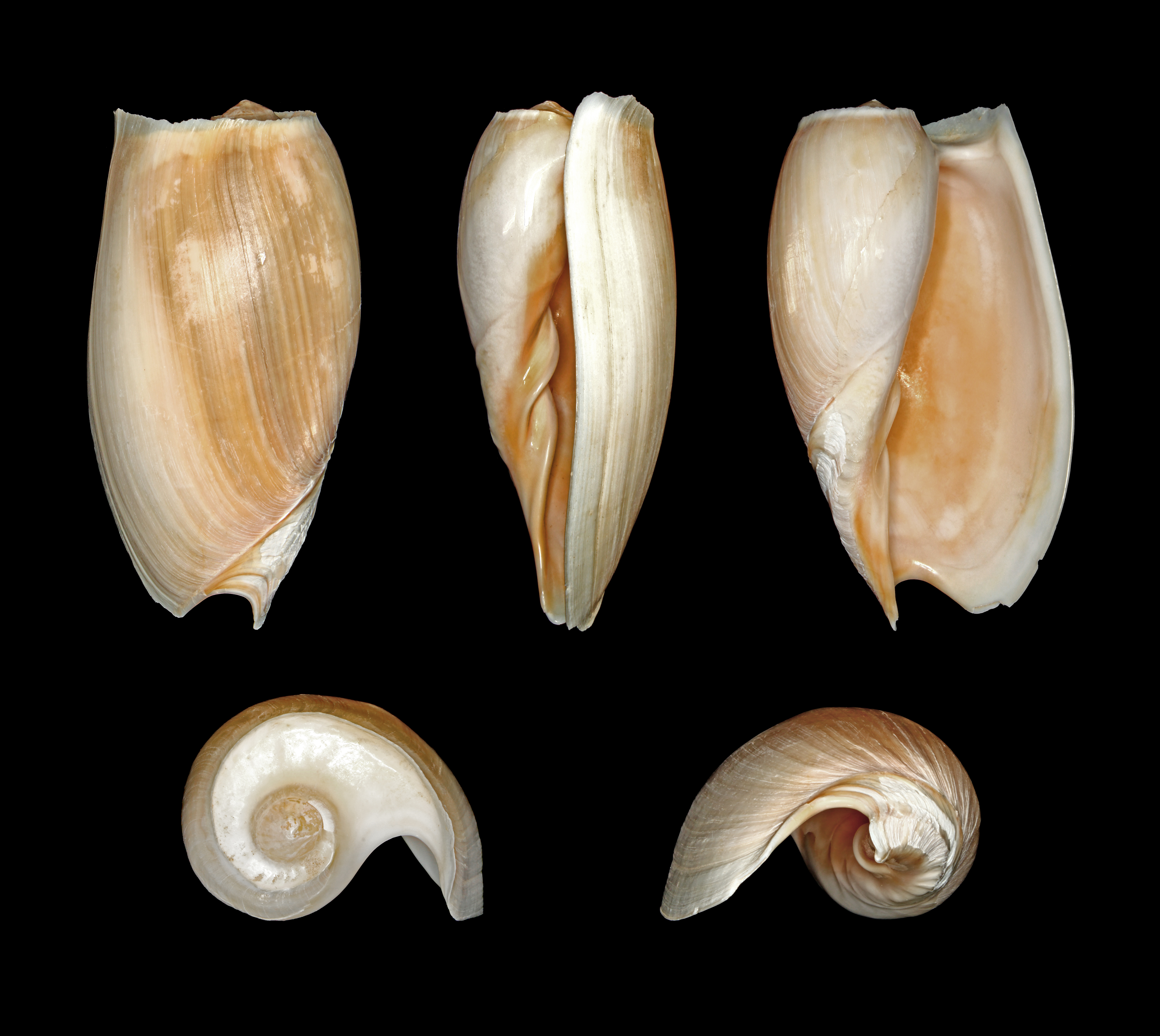
- Shell of Cymbium cymbium

Scientific classification
- Kingdom: Animalia
- Phylum: Mollusca
- Class: Gastropoda
- Subclass: Caenogastropoda
- Order: Neogastropoda
- Family: Volutidae
- Genus: Cymbium
- Species: C. cymbium

Binomial name
- Cymbium cymbium (Linnaeus, 1758)

Synonyms
- Cymba porcina Lamarck, 1811; Cymbium cisium Menke, 1828; Cymbium jacobinum Röding, 1798; Cymbium unicolor Link, 1807; Voluta scafa Lightfoot, 1786

= Cymbium cymbium =

Species of gastropod

Cymbium cymbium, commonly known as the false elephant's snout volute, is a species of sea snail, a marine gastropod mollusc in the family Volutidae, the volutes.
