= Cymbium marmoratum =

Scientific classification
- Kingdom: Animalia
- Phylum: Mollusca
- Class: Gastropoda
- Subclass: Caenogastropoda
- Order: Neogastropoda
- Family: Volutidae
- Genus: Cymbium
- Species: C. marmoratum

Binomial name
- Cymbium marmoratum Link, 1807

Species of gastropod

Cymbium marmoratum, commonly known as the marble cymbium volute, is a species of sea snail, a marine gastropod mollusc in the family Volutidae, the volutes.

== Gallery ==
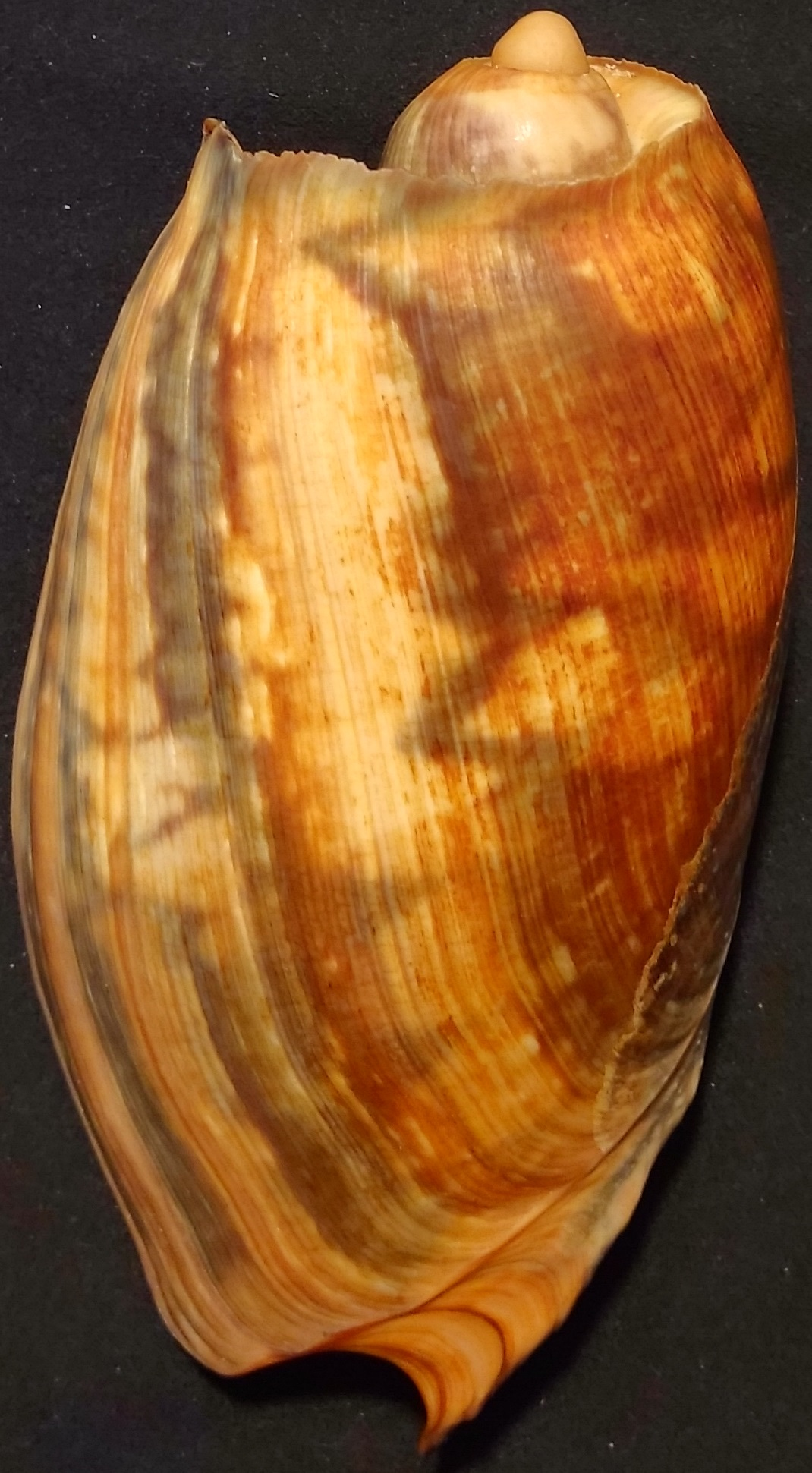

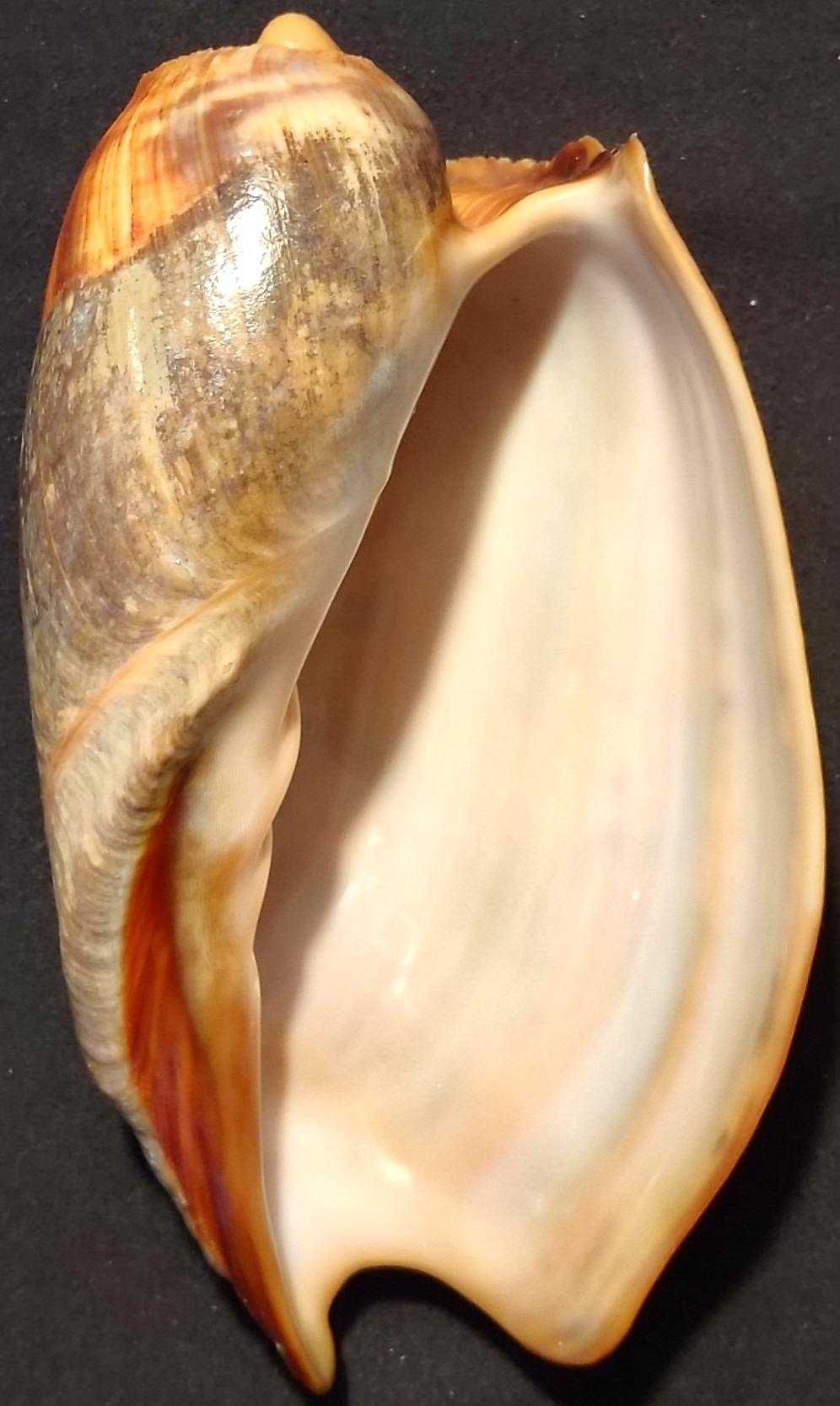

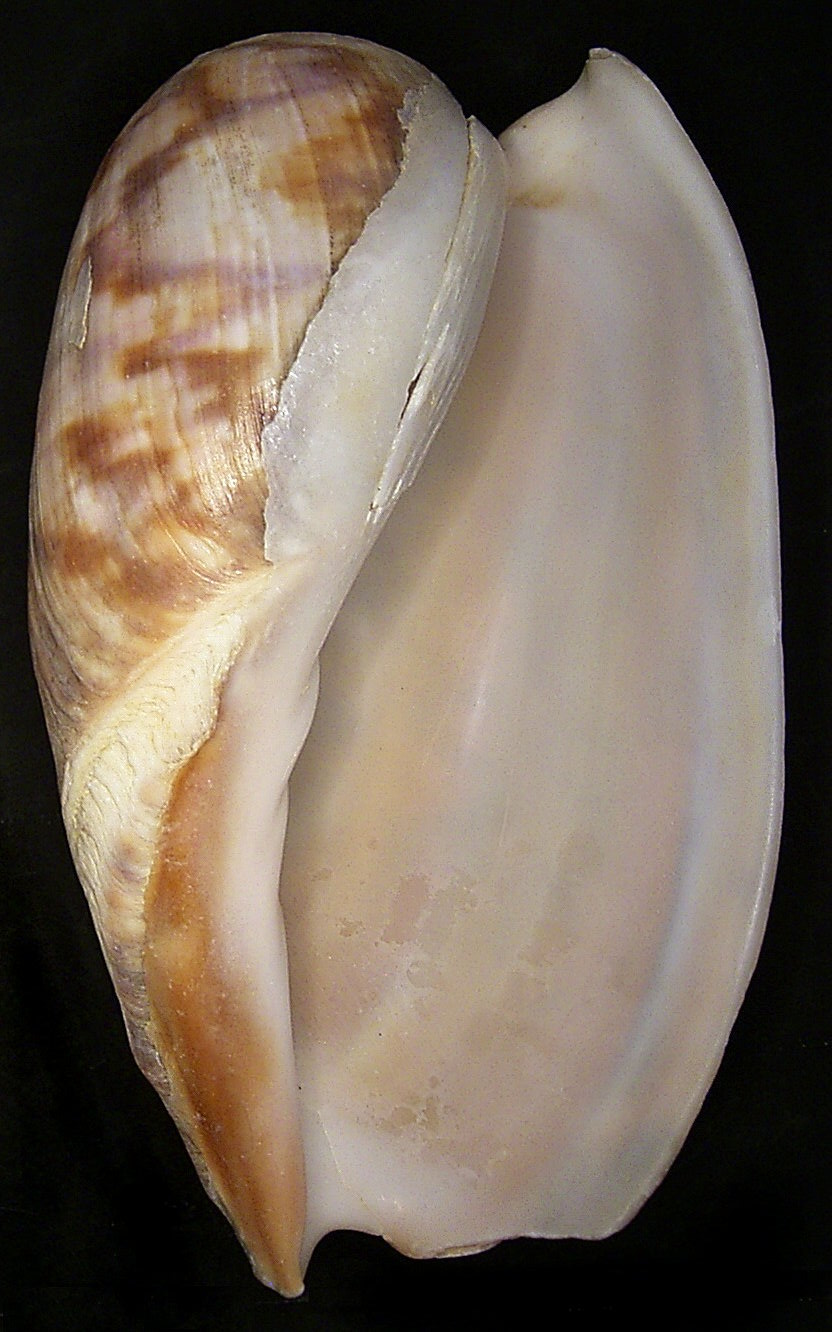
