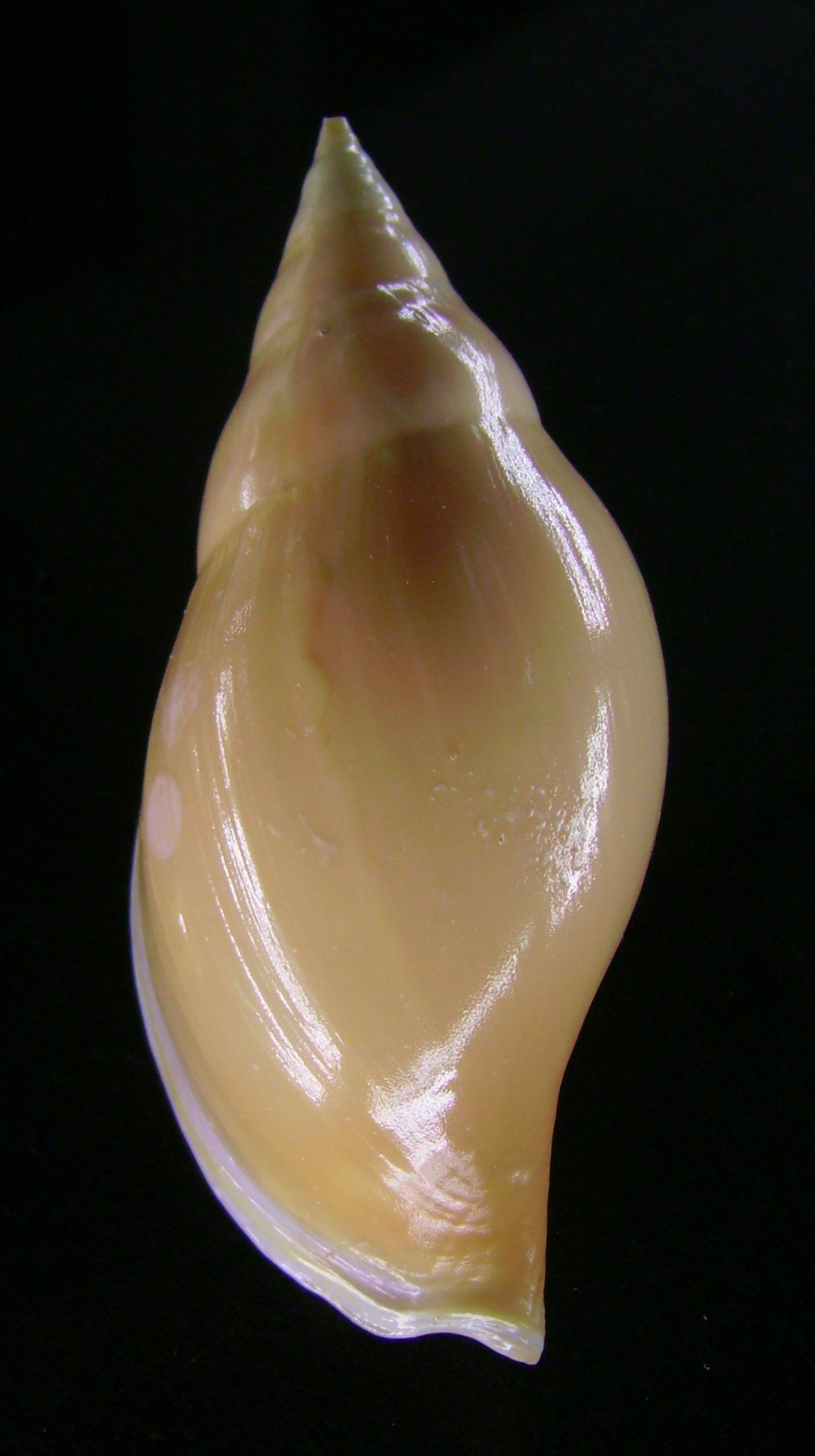
- Golden volute, Provocator mirabilis

Scientific classification
- Kingdom: Animalia
- Phylum: Mollusca
- Class: Gastropoda
- Subclass: Caenogastropoda
- Order: Neogastropoda
- Family: Volutidae
- Genus: Provocator
- Species: P. mirabilis

Binomial name
- Provocator mirabilis (Finlay, 1926)

Synonyms
- Iredalina aurantia Powell, 1954; Iredalina finlayi L. C. King, 1933; Iredalina mirabilis Finlay, 1926; Provocator (Iredalina) mirabilis (H. J. Finlay, 1926)

= Golden volute =

Species of gastropod

The golden volute, Provocator mirabilis, is a species of rare, large, deepwater sea snail, a marine gastropod mollusc in the family Volutidae, the volutes.

== Distribution ==
This species is endemic to New Zealand. It is found off the east coast.

== Habitat ==
This volute lives at depths of between 180 and 700 m, although empty shells are sometimes found in shallower water, presumably carried there by hermit crabs.

== Shell description ==
This rare shell is highly prized by collectors.

The shell height is up to 140 mm, and the width up to 48 mm.
