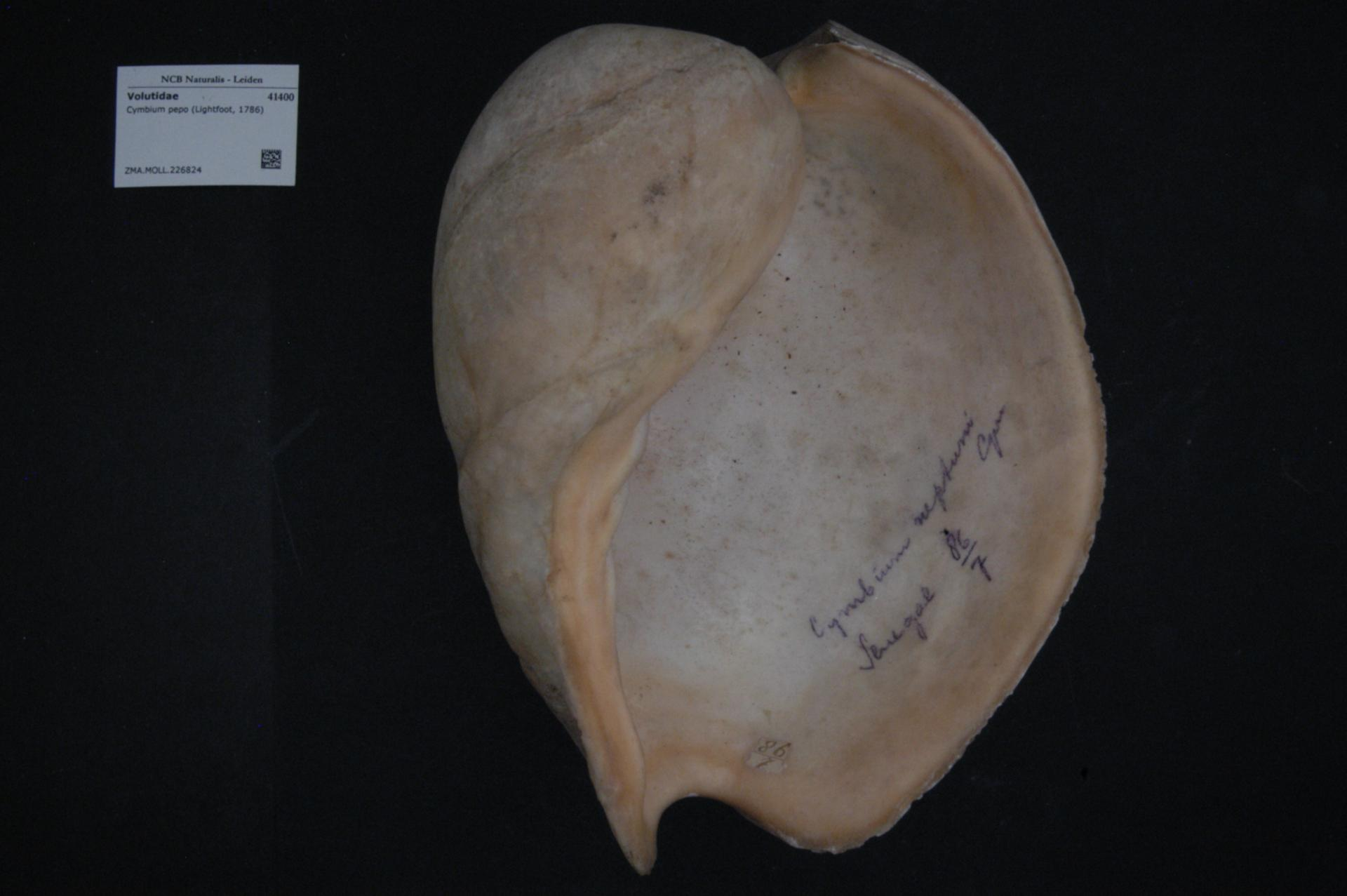

Scientific classification
- Kingdom: Animalia
- Phylum: Mollusca
- Class: Gastropoda
- Subclass: Caenogastropoda
- Order: Neogastropoda
- Family: Volutidae
- Genus: Cymbium
- Species: C. pepo

Binomial name
- Cymbium pepo (Lightfoot, 1786)

Synonyms
- Cymbium guttatum Röding, 1798; Cymbium inflata Röding, 1798; Cymbium navicula Gmelin, 1791; Cymbium neptuni Gmelin, 1791; Cymbium papillaris Gmelin, 1791; Cymbium praeputium Röding, 1798

= Cymbium pepo =

Species of gastropod

Cymbium pepo, commonly known as the African Neptune volute, is a species of sea snail, a marine gastropod mollusc in the family Volutidae, the volutes.

== Distribution ==
It is distributed across the coastal shores of western Africa and can be found in saline mud beaches.
