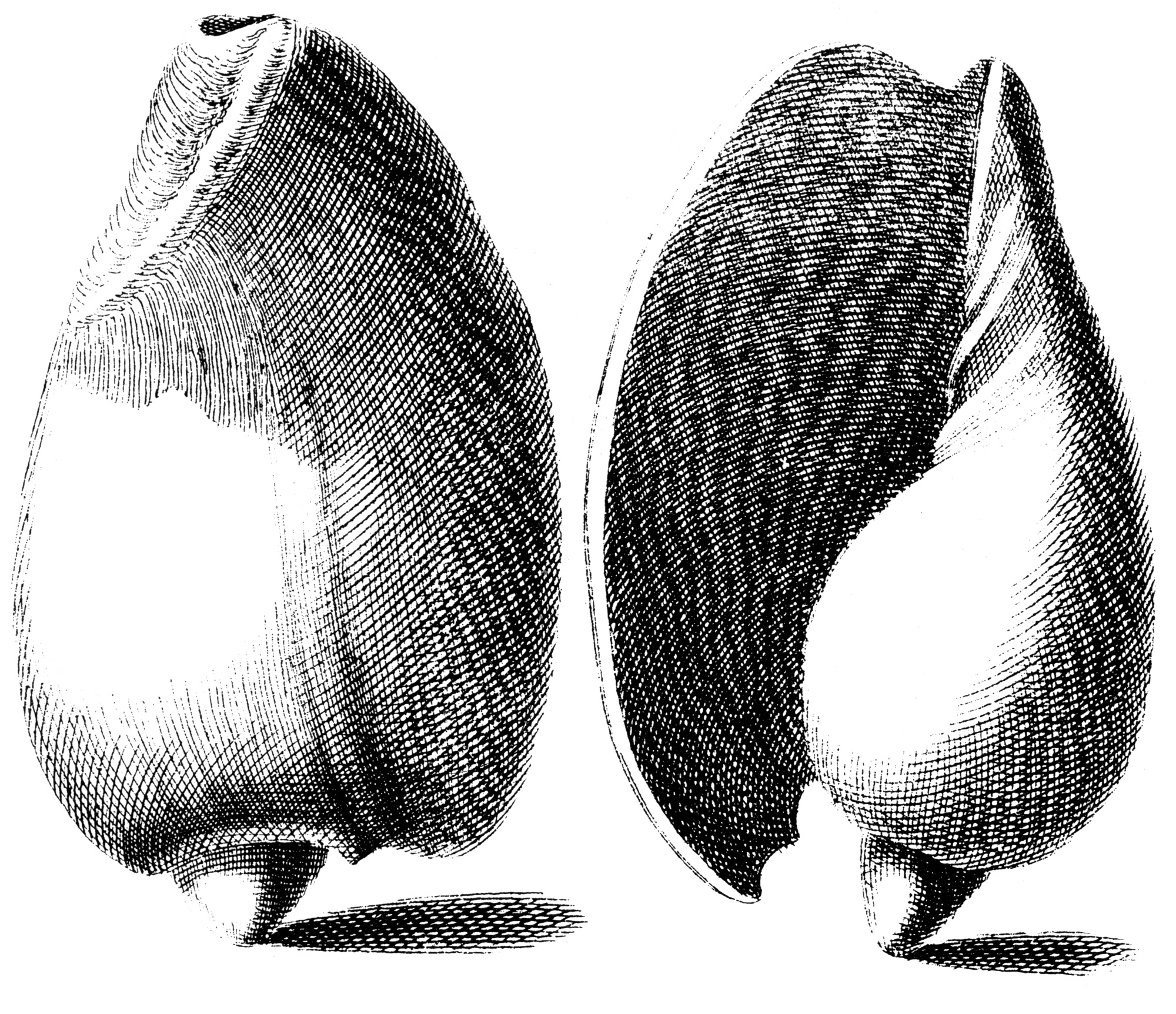
- Shell of Cymbium olla

Scientific classification
- Kingdom: Animalia
- Phylum: Mollusca
- Class: Gastropoda
- Subclass: Caenogastropoda
- Order: Neogastropoda
- Family: Volutidae
- Genus: Cymbium
- Species: C. olla

Binomial name
- Cymbium olla (Linnaeus, 1758)

Synonyms
- Cymbium papillatum Schumacher, 1817; Cymbium philipinum Röding, 1798; Cymbium productum Lowe, 1861; Voluta olla Linnaeus, 1758; Yetus productus (R. T. Lowe, 1861); Yetus productus var. major Pallary, 1930; Yetus productus var. major Pallary, 1930; Yetus turriculatus Pallary, 1930

= Cymbium olla =

Species of gastropod

Cymbium olla, commonly known as the Algarve volute, is a species of sea snail, a marine gastropod mollusc in the family Volutidae, the volutes. The fermented and dried flesh, called ‘’yeet’’ has a pungent smell, and is used in the Senegalese traditional Thieboudienne.
