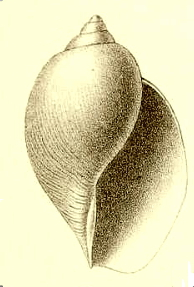
- Drawing of a shell of Harpovoluta charcoti

Scientific classification
- Kingdom: Animalia
- Phylum: Mollusca
- Class: Gastropoda
- Subclass: Caenogastropoda
- Order: Neogastropoda
- Family: Volutidae
- Genus: Harpovoluta; Thiele, 1912

Type species
- Harpovoluta vanhoeffeni Thiele, 1912

= Harpovoluta =

Genus of gastropods

Harpovoluta is a genus of sea snails, marine gastropod mollusks in the subfamily Cymbiinae of the family Volutidae.

== Species ==
Species within the genus Harpovoluta include:

- Harpovoluta charcoti (Lamy, 1910)

Species brought into synonymy

- Harpovoluta vanhoeffeni Thiele, 1912: synonym of Harpovoluta charcoti (Lamy, 1910)
