= Miomelon =

Scientific classification
- Kingdom: Animalia
- Phylum: Mollusca
- Class: Gastropoda
- Subclass: Caenogastropoda
- Order: Neogastropoda
- Family: Volutidae
- Subfamily: Cymbiinae
- Genus: Miomelon; Dall, 1907

Synonyms
- Proscaphella von Ihering, 1907

Genus of gastropods

Miomelon is a genus of sea snails, marine gastropod mollusks in the family Volutidae.

== Species ==
Species within the genus Miomelon include:

- Miomelon alarconi Stuardo & Villas, 1974
- Miomelon eltanini Dell, 1990
- Miomelon philippiana (Dall, 1890)
- Miomelon turnerae Dell, 1990
