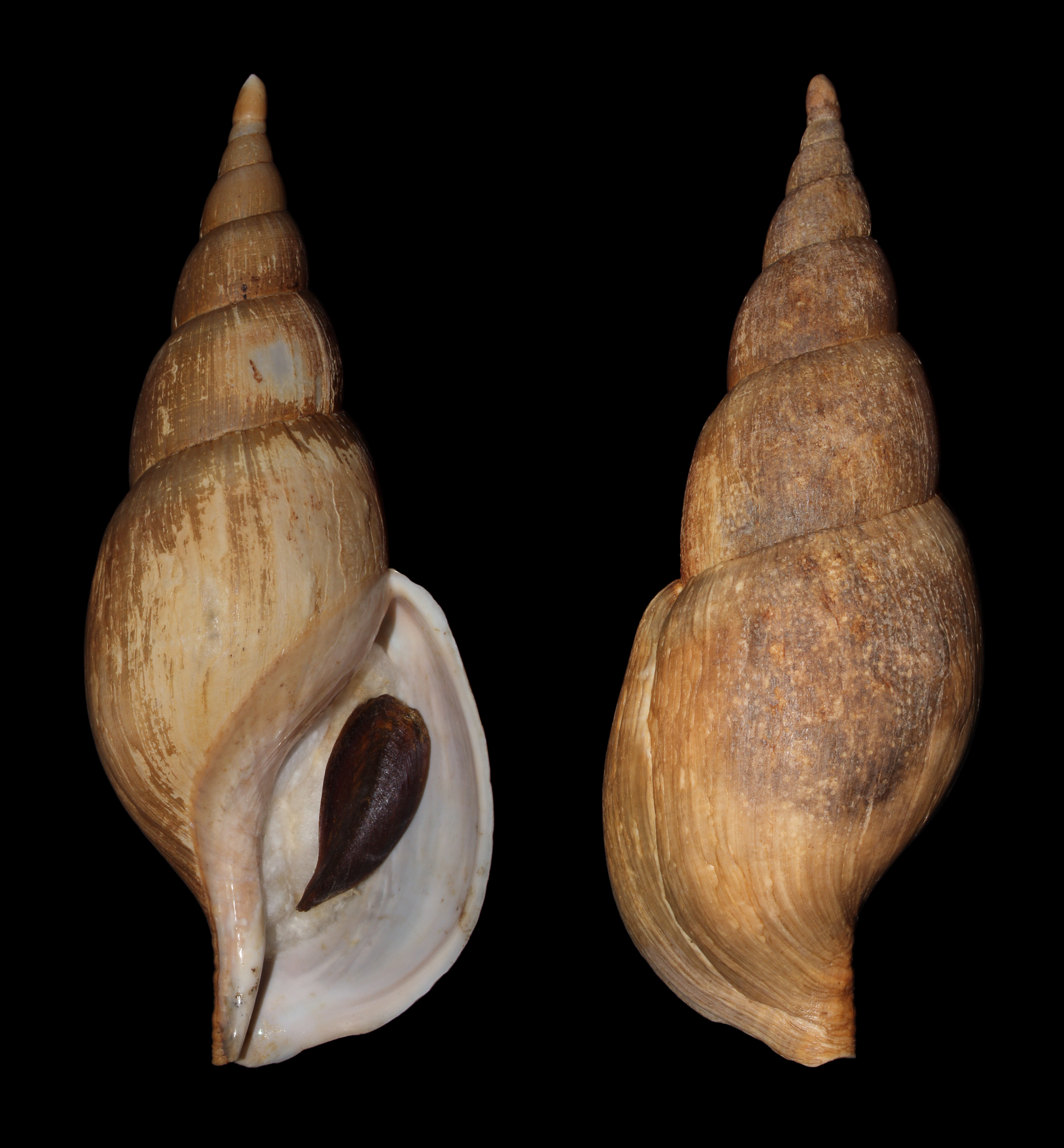
- A shell of Neptuneopsis gilchristi.

Scientific classification
- Kingdom: Animalia
- Phylum: Mollusca
- Class: Gastropoda
- Subclass: Caenogastropoda
- Order: Neogastropoda
- Superfamily: Volutoidea
- Family: Volutidae
- Genus: Neptuneopsis; G.B. III, 1898

Type species
- Neptuneopsis gilchristi G. B. Sowerby III, 1898

= Neptuneopsis =

Genus of gastropods

Neptuneopsis is a genus of sea snails, marine gastropod mollusks in the family Volutidae.

== Species ==
Species within the genus Neptuneopsis include:

- Neptuneopsis gilchristi Sowerby III, 1898
