= Leptoscapha =

Scientific classification
- Kingdom: Animalia
- Phylum: Mollusca
- Class: Gastropoda
- Subclass: Caenogastropoda
- Order: Neogastropoda
- Family: Volutidae
- Subfamily: Volutinae
- Genus: Leptoscapha; Fischer, 1883

Genus of gastropods

Leptoscapha is a genus of sea snails, marine gastropod mollusks in the family Volutidae.

== Species ==
Species within the genus Leptoscapha include:

- Leptoscapha crassilabrum (Tate, 1889)
