= Minicymbiola =

Scientific classification
- Kingdom: Animalia
- Phylum: Mollusca
- Class: Gastropoda
- Subclass: Caenogastropoda
- Order: Neogastropoda
- Family: Volutidae
- Genus: Minicymbiola; Klappenbach, 1979

Genus of gastropods

Minicymbiola is a genus of sea snails, marine gastropod mollusks in the family Volutidae.

== Species ==
Species within the genus Minicymbiola include:

- Minicymbiola corderoi (Carcelles, 1953)
