= Nanomelon =

Scientific classification
- Kingdom: Animalia
- Phylum: Mollusca
- Class: Gastropoda
- Subclass: Caenogastropoda
- Order: Neogastropoda
- Family: Volutidae
- Subfamily: Cymbiinae
- Genus: Nanomelon; Leal & Bouchet, 1989

Genus of gastropods

Nanomelon is a genus of sea snails, marine gastropod mollusks in the family Volutidae.

== Species ==
Species within the genus Nanomelon include:

- Nanomelon viperinus Leal & Bouchet, 1989
- Nanomelon vossi Leal & Rios, 1990
