= Cymbium patulum =

Scientific classification
- Kingdom: Animalia
- Phylum: Mollusca
- Class: Gastropoda
- Subclass: Caenogastropoda
- Order: Neogastropoda
- Family: Volutidae
- Genus: Cymbium
- Species: C. patulum

Binomial name
- Cymbium patulum (Broderip, 1830)

Species of gastropod

Cymbium patulum is a species of sea snail, a marine gastropod mollusc in the family Volutidae, the volutes.
