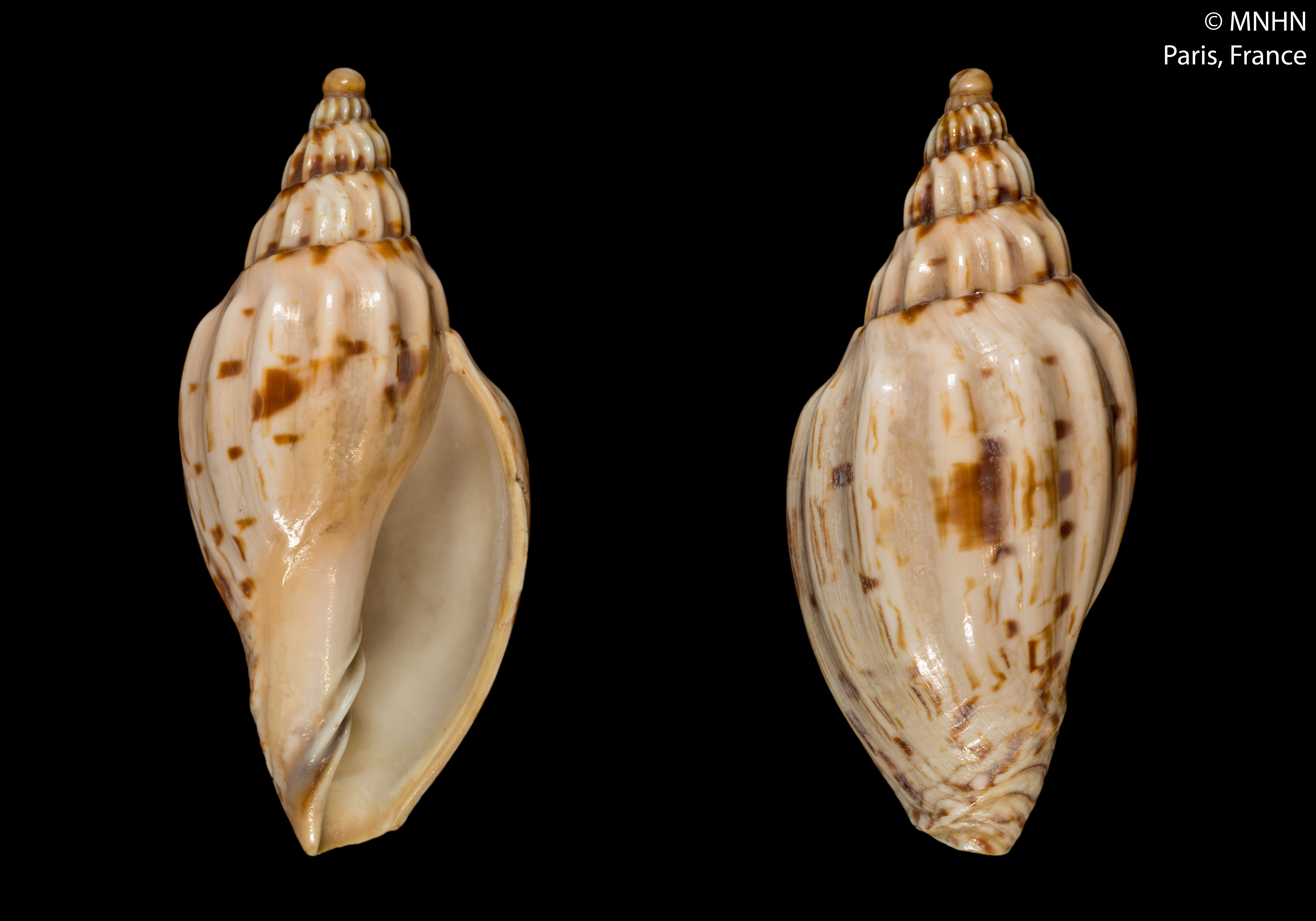
- Callipara festiva

Scientific classification
- Kingdom: Animalia
- Phylum: Mollusca
- Class: Gastropoda
- Subclass: Caenogastropoda
- Order: Neogastropoda
- Superfamily: Volutoidea
- Family: Volutidae
- Subfamily: Volutinae
- Genus: Callipara; Gray, 1847

Type species
- Voluta bullata Swainson, 1829

Synonyms
- List: Callipara (Callipara) Gray, 1847; Callipara (Canalilyria) Bail & Poppe, 2001; Callipara (Festilyria) Pilsbry & Olsson, 1954; Callipara (Simililyria) Bail & Poppe, 2001; Festilyria Pilsbry & Olsson, 1954; Lyria (Festilyria) Pilsbry & Olsson, 1954; Simililyria Bail & Poppe, 2001; Similyria [lapsis]; Voluta (Callipara) Gray, 1847

= Callipara =

Genus of gastropods

Callipara is a genus of sea snails, marine gastropod mollusks in the family Volutidae.

== Species ==
The following species are recognised in the genus Callipara:

- Callipara africana (Reeve, 1856)
- Callipara aikeni Veldsman, 2012
- Callipara aphrodite (Bondarev, 1999)
- Callipara bullatiana (Weaver & du Pont, 1967)
- Callipara casaana Childs, R. Aiken & Bail, 2020
- Callipara duponti (Weaver, 1968)
- Callipara festiva (Lamarck, 1811)
- Callipara kurodai (Kawamura, 1964)
- Callipara ponsonbyi (Smith, 1901)
- Callipara queketti (Smith, 1901)
- Callipara veldsmani Veldsman, 2012
- Callipara victoriae Childs, R. Aiken & Bail, 2020
- Callipara zululandensis Veldsman, 2012

== Description ==
Some of the species of the genus Callipara have a radula with vestigial lateral teeth. Teleoconch whorls are shouldered and nodulose, with the three early whorls axially ribbed. They often have with a black blotch near the siphonal canal and the upper part of the aperture. All species have a shoulder, except in Callipara bullatiana where the well-defined shoulder changes at a slight angle.

The thin shell is oblong-ovate. The spire is short and obtuse, with the apex papillary. The body whorl is large and ventricose. The columella shows two distinct folds in front. The outer lip extends up towards the spire posteriorly.

== Distribution ==
The snails of this genus are found in the Indian Ocean off East Africa.
