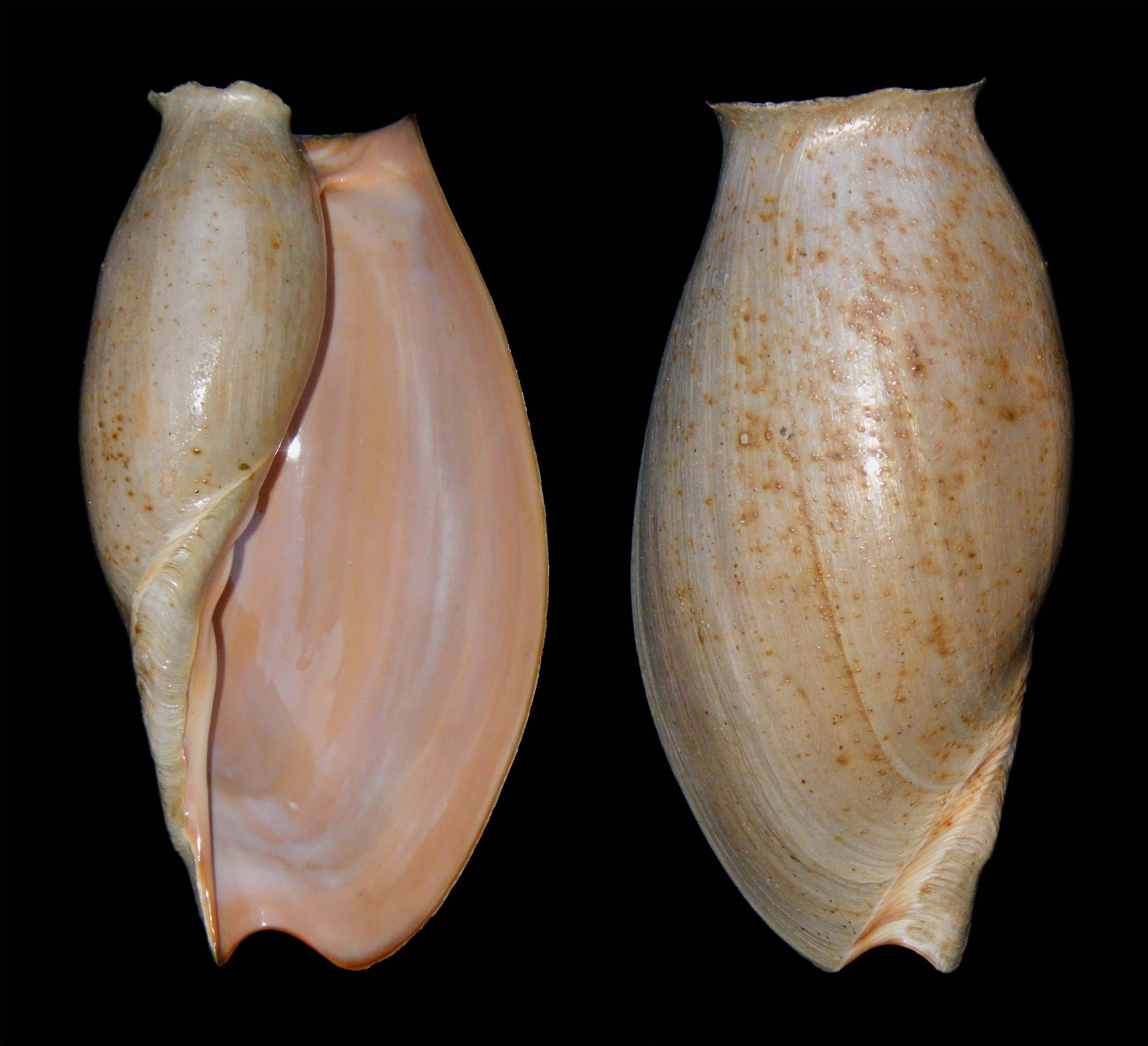
- shell of Cymbium glans

Scientific classification
- Kingdom: Animalia
- Phylum: Mollusca
- Class: Gastropoda
- Subclass: Caenogastropoda
- Order: Neogastropoda
- Superfamily: Volutoidea
- Family: Volutidae
- Genus: Cymbium; Röding, 1798

Type species
- Cymbium jacobinum Röding, 1798

Synonyms
- Cymba Broderip, 1826; Yetus Gray, 1855

= Cymbium (gastropod) =

Genus of gastropods

Cymbium is a genus of sea snails, marine gastropod mollusks in the family Volutidae.

== Description ==
The oval-oblong shell is ventricose. The spire is short, the protoconch is large, globular, deciduous, when present forming an obtuse papillary apex. The few whorls form a flat edge round the protoconch. The aperture is oblong and wide The columella shows several oblique plaits. The outer lip is thin and simple.

== Distribution ==
All the species of this genus are restricted to Western Africa.

== Species ==
Species within the genus Cymbium include:

- Cymbium coenyei Nolf, 2017
- Cymbium cucumis Röding, 1798
- Cymbium cymbium (Linnaeus, 1758)
- Cymbium fragile Fittkau & Stürmer, 1985
- Cymbium glans (Gmelin, 1791)
- Cymbium gracile (Broderip, 1830)
- Cymbium marmoratum Link, 1807
- Cymbium olla (Linnaeus, 1758)
- Cymbium pachyus (Pallary, 1930)
- Cymbium patulum (Broderip, 1830)
- Cymbium pepo (Lightfoot, 1786)
- Cymbium senegalense Marche-Marchad, 1978
- Cymbium souliei Marche-Marchad, 1974
- Cymbium tritonis (Broderip, 1830)

Species brought into synonymy

- Cymbium aethiopicum (Linnaeus, 1758): synonym of Melo aethiopicus (Linnaeus, 1758)
- Cymbium caputvelatum Bruynseels, 1975: synonym of Cymbium tritonis (Broderip, 1830)
- Cymbium cisium Menke, 1828: synonym of Cymbium cymbium (Linnaeus, 1758)
- Cymbium flammeum Röding, 1798: synonym of Melo amphora (Lightfoot, 1786)
- Cymbium guttatum Röding, 1798: synonym of Cymbium pepo (Lightfoot, 1786)
- Cymbium indicum (Gmelin, 1790): synonym of Melo melo (Lightfoot, 1786)
- Cymbium inflata Röding, 1798: synonym of Cymbium pepo (Lightfoot, 1786)
- Cymbium jacobinum Röding, 1798: synonym of Cymbium cymbium (Linnaeus, 1758)
- Cymbium maculatum Röding, 1798: synonym of Melo melo (Lightfoot, 1786)
- Cymbium melo (Lightfoot, 1786): synonym of Melo melo (Lightfoot, 1786)
- Cymbium navicula Gmelin, 1791: synonym of Cymbium pepo (Lightfoot, 1786)
- Cymbium neptuni Gmelin, 1791: synonym of Cymbium pepo (Lightfoot, 1786)
- Cymbium papillaris Gmelin, 1791: synonym of Cymbium pepo (Lightfoot, 1786)
- Cymbium papillatum Schumacher, 1817: synonym of Cymbium olla (Linnaeus, 1758)
- Cymbium philipinum Röding, 1798: synonym of Cymbium olla (Linnaeus, 1758)
- Cymbium praeputium Röding, 1798: synonym of Cymbium pepo (Lightfoot, 1786)
- Cymbium productum R. T. Lowe, 1861: synonym of Cymbium olla (Linnaeus, 1758)
- Cymbium rubiginosum (R. T. Lowe, 1861): synonym of Cymbium cucumis Röding, 1798
- Cymbium rubiginosum (Swainson, 1822): synonym of Cymbium cucumis Röding, 1798
- Cymbium unicolor Link, 1807: synonym of Cymbium cymbium (Linnaeus, 1758)
