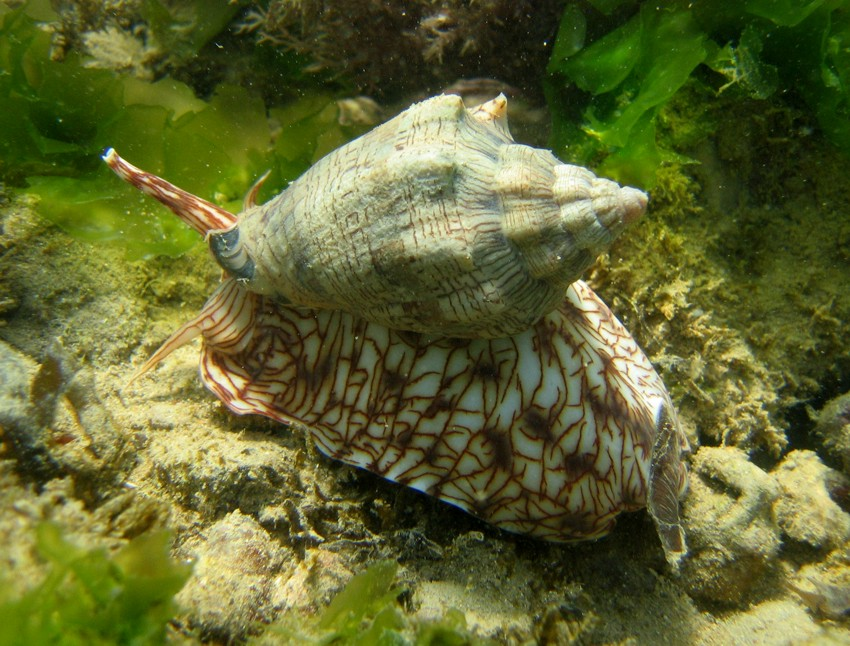
- A live individual of the Hebrew volute Voluta ebraea in its natural habitat

Scientific classification
- Kingdom: Animalia
- Phylum: Mollusca
- Class: Gastropoda
- Subclass: Caenogastropoda
- Order: Neogastropoda
- Superfamily: Volutoidea
- Family: Volutidae; Rafinesque, 1815

Subfamilies
- See text

= Volutidae =

Volutidae Temporal range: Cretaceous to Recent

Family of sea snails

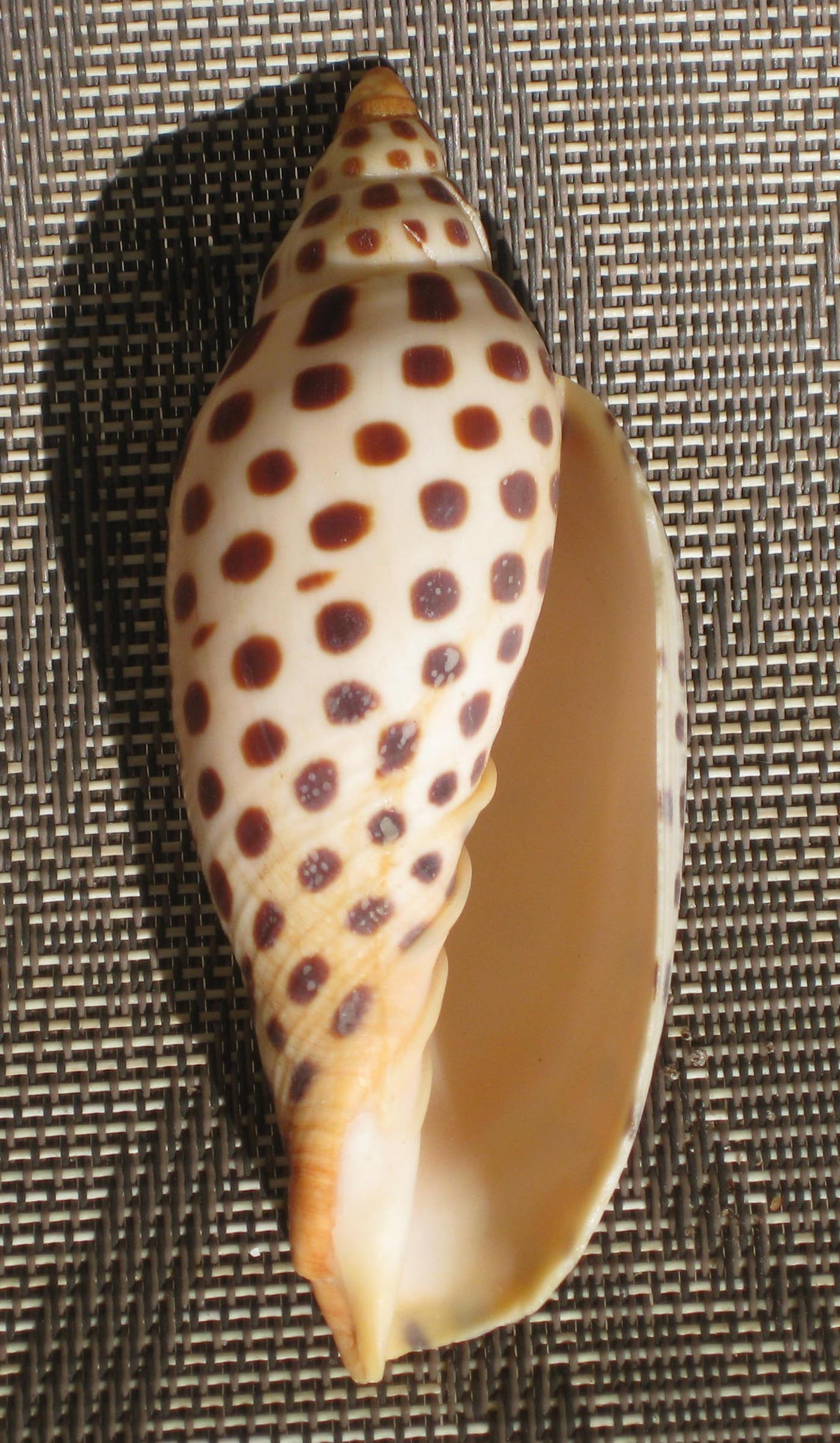
Apertural view of a shell of Scaphella junonia

Volutidae, common name volutes, are a taxonomic family of predatory sea snails that range in size from 9 mm to over 500 mm. They are marine gastropod mollusks. Most of the species have no operculum.

== Distribution ==
This family of sea snails are found mainly in tropical seas, though some species also inhabit the waters of the polar circles.

== Description ==
The large head has the eyes sessile on the sides below the base of the tentacles. The tentacles are far apart, united by a broad veil over the head. The mantle is sometimes greatly developed, covering the sides of the shell. The siphon is recurved, short, with auricles on each side of the base. The foot is very large, partly hiding the shell. There is no operculum.

The shell shows distinct plaits on the columella. The apex of the spire is mamillated. The shells have an elongated aperture in their first whorl and an inner lip characterised by a number of deep plaits.

The family of Volutidae comprises a suite of large shells remarkable for their great beauty and elegance of form. The shell of species such as Melo amphora can grow as large as 50 cm (19.7 inches) in length.

Volutes are distinguished by their distinctively marked spiral shells (to which the family name refers, voluta meaning "scroll" in Latin).

The elaborate decorations of the shells has made them a popular collector's item, with the imperial volute (Voluta imperialis) of the Philippines being particularly prized.

== Taxonomy ==
=== Subfamilies and tribes ===
According to Bail & Poppe (2001) Volutidae can be subdivided into the following subfamilies and tribes:

- Amoriinae Gray, 1857
  - Tribe Amoriini Gray, 1857
  - Tribe Meloini Pilsbry & Olsson, 1954
  - Tribe Notovolutini Bail & Poppe, 2001
- Athletinae Pilsbry & Olsson, 1954
- Calliotectinae Pilsbry & Olsson, 1954
- Cymbiinae H. Adams & A. Adams, 1853
  - Tribe Adelomelonini Pilsbry & Olsson, 1954
  - Tribe Alcithoini Pilsbry & Olsson, 1954
  - Tribe Cymbiini H. Adams & A. Adams, 1853
  - Tribe Livoniini Bail & Poppe, 2001
  - Tribe Odontocymbiolini Clench & Turner, 1964
  - Tribe Zidonini H. Adams & A. Adams, 1853
- † Eovolutinae Pacaud, 2016
- Fulgorariinae Pilsbry & Olsson, 1954
- † Indovolutinae Halder & S. S. Das, 2019
- Plicolivinae Bouchet, 1990
- Scaphellinae Gray, 1857
- † Volutilithinae Pilsbry & Olsson, 1954
- Volutinae Rafinesque, 1815
  - Tribe Lyriini Pilsbry & Olsson, 1954
  - Tribe Volutini Rafinesque, 1815

=== Genera ===
Genera within the Volutidae include:

- Adelomelon Dall, 1906
- Alcithoe H. Adams & A. Adams, 1853
- Amoria Gray, 1855
- Ampulla Röding, 1798
- Arctomelon Dall, 1915
- Athleta Conrad, 1853
- Callipara Gray, 1847
- Calliotectum Dall, 1890
- Capensisvoluta S. G. Veldsman & J. H. Veldsman, 2022
- Cymbiola Swainson, 1831
- Cymbiolacca
- Cymbium Röding, 1798
  - Cymbium cymbium
  - Cymbium glans
  - Cymbium marmoratum
  - Cymbium olla (Linnaeus, 1758)
  - Cymbium pepo
- Enaeta H. Adams and A. Adams, 1853
- Ericusa H. Adams and A. Adams, 1858
- Festilyria Pilsbry & Olsson, 1954
- Fulgoraria Schumacher, 1817
- Fusivoluta E. von Martens, 1902

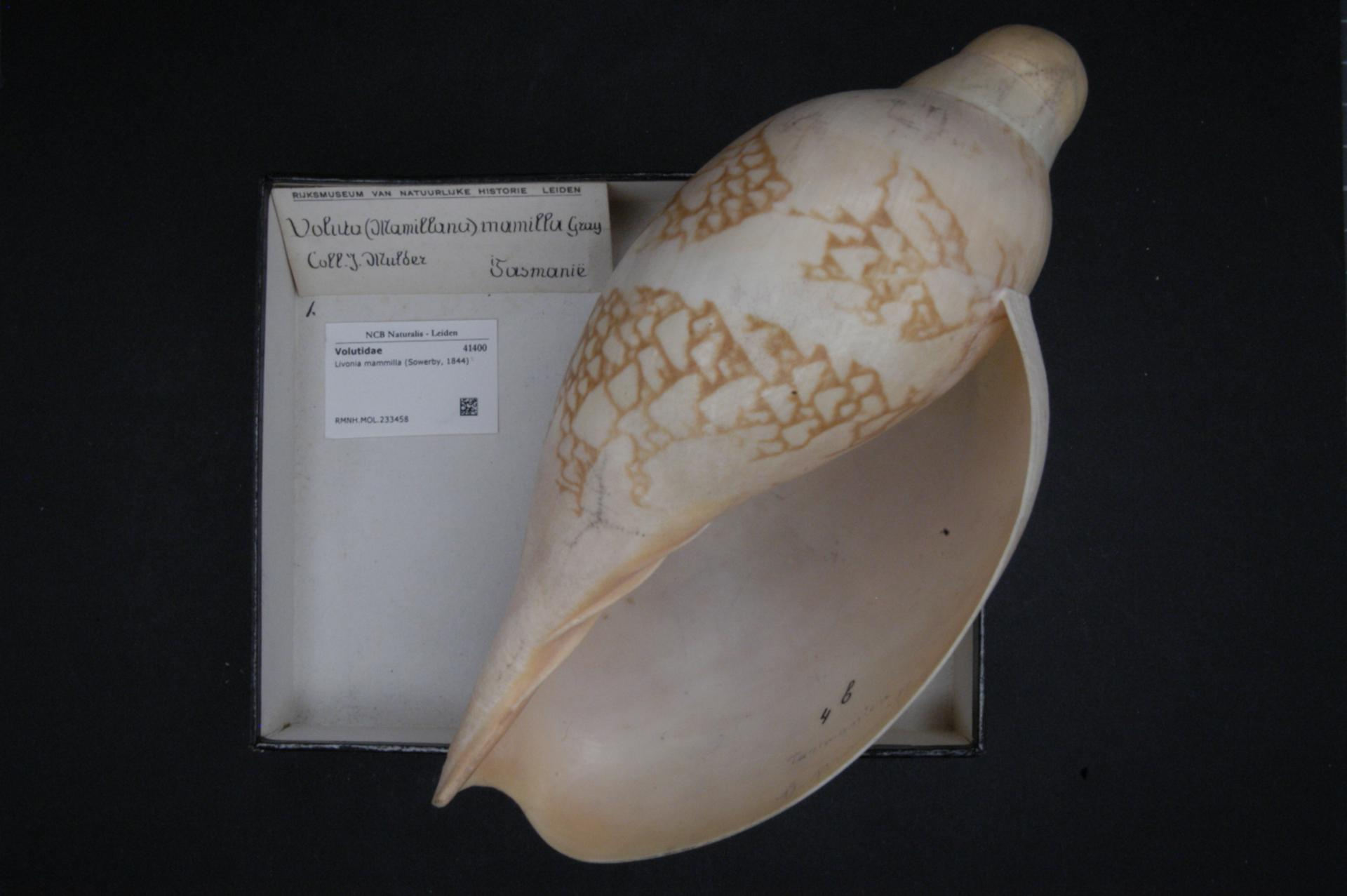
Livonia mammilla (Sowerby, 1844), museum specimen.

- Harpovoluta Thiele, 1912
- Harpulina Dall, 1906
- Iredalina Finlay, 1926
- Leptoscapha Fischer, 1883
- Livonia Gray, 1855
- Lyria Gray, 1847
- † Mauira Marwick, 1943
- † Mauithoe Finlay, 1930
- Melo Broderip in Sowerby I, 1826

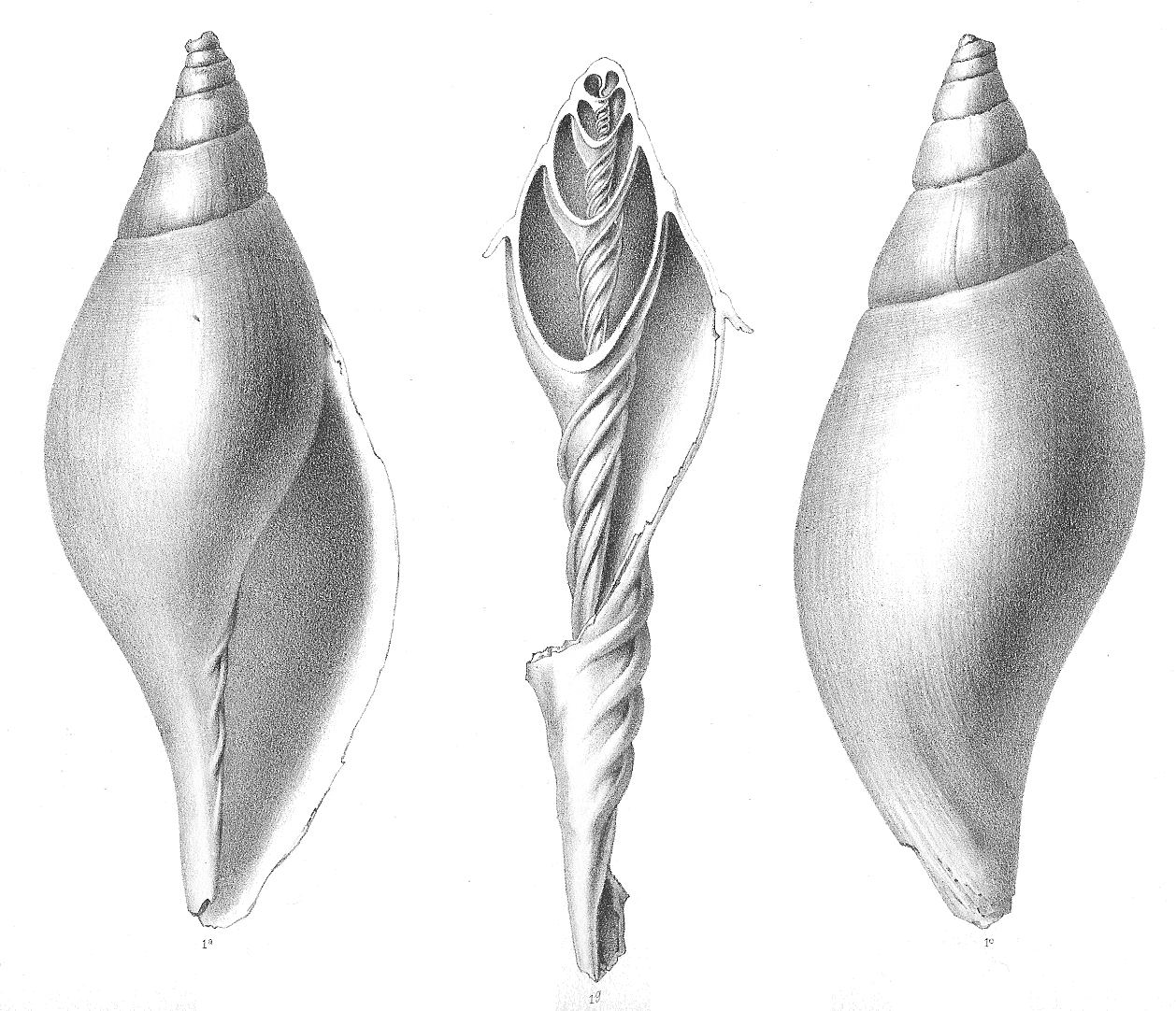
Two views of a shell of Scaphella lamberti, and in the center, a cut-down shell showing the folds on the columella

- † Metamelon Marwick, 1926
- Minicymbiola Klappenbach, 1979
- Miomelon Dall, 1907
- † Mitreola Swainson, 1833
- Nannamoria Iredale, 1929
- Nanomelon Leal & Bouchet, 1989
- Nataliavoluta S. G. Veldsman & J. H. Veldsman, 2022
- Neptuneopsis Sowerby III, 1898
- Notopeplum Finlay, 1927
- Notovoluta Cotton, 1946
- Odontocymbiola Clench & Turner, 1964
- Pachycymbiola Ihering, 1907
- † Pachymelon Marwick, 1926
- Paramoria McMichael, 1960
- Plicoliva Petuch, 1979
- Provocator Watson, 1882
- Scaphella Swainson, 1832
- Spinomelon Marwick, 1926
- Tenebrincola Harasewych & Kantor, 1991
- Teramachia
- Ternivoluta E. von Martens, 1897
- Tractolira Dall, 1890
- Voluta Linnaeus, 1758
- Volutifusus Conrad, 1863
- Volutoconus Crosse, 1871
- Waihaoia Marwick, 1926
- Zygomelon Harasewych & Marshall, 1995
- Zidona H. Adams and A. Adams, 1853
