= Lyria (Plicolyria) =

Scientific classification
- Kingdom: Animalia
- Phylum: Mollusca
- Class: Gastropoda
- Subclass: Caenogastropoda
- Order: Neogastropoda
- Family: Volutidae
- Genus: Lyria
- Subgenus: Plicolyria; Bail & Poppe, 2001

Synonyms
- Plicolyria Bail & Poppe, 2001

Subgenus of gastropods

Lyria (Plicolyria) is a subgenus of sea snail, a marine gastropod mollusc in the family Volutidae.

== Species ==
The following species are assigned to this subgenus:

- Lyria boholensis Poppe, 1987
- Lyria boucheti Bail & Poppe, 2004
- Lyria exorata Bouchet & Poppe, 1988
- Lyria grandidieri Bail, 2002
- Lyria guionneti Poppe & Conde, 2001
- Lyria kuniene Bouchet, 1979
- Lyria planicostata (G. B. Sowerby III, 1903)
- Lyria poppei Bail, 2002
