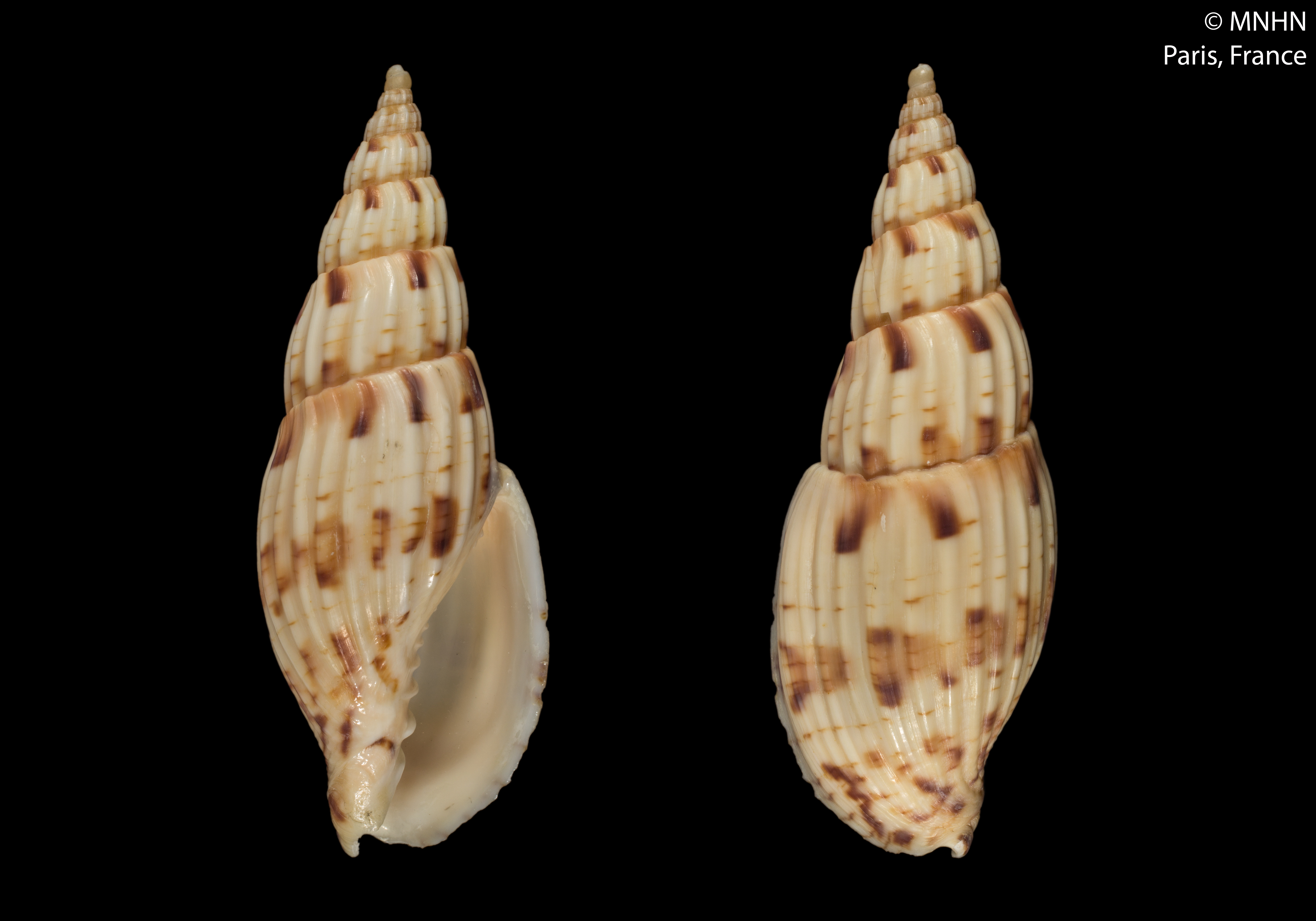
- Holotype at MNHN (Paris)

Scientific classification
- Kingdom: Animalia
- Phylum: Mollusca
- Class: Gastropoda
- Subclass: Caenogastropoda
- Order: Neogastropoda
- Family: Volutidae
- Genus: Lyria
- Species: L. doutei

Binomial name
- Lyria doutei Bouchet & Bail, 1992

Synonyms
- Indolyria doutei (Bouchet & Bail, 1991); Lyria (Indolyria) doutei Bouchet & Bail, 1991· accepted, alternate representation; Lyria valentina Bondarev, 1994

= Lyria doutei =

Species of gastropod

Lyria doutei is a species of sea snail, a marine gastropod mollusk in the family Volutidae, the volutes.

== Description ==
The holotype measures 83.5 mm tall, 30.0 mm wide, and has an apertural opening of 39.0 mm. The shell is large and fusiform, with a bulbous protoconch, rather shallow sutures, and slightly sigmoid orthocline ribs. The aperture has eight pronounced columellar plaits, followed by three indistinct parietal plaits. The ground color is beige with tan flammules arranged in a spiral, with a thin medial line between bands.

L. doutei generally resembles other East African and Indian Ocean lyriniids, namely L. lyraeformis, L. leslieboschae, L. cloveriana, and L. surinamensis. It differs from L. lyraeformis, its closest congener, by way of its greater number of body whorls, smaller body size, and far fewer spiral threads between bands.

== Distribution ==
This marine species occurs on the Saya de Malha Bank in the Indian Ocean, where the holotype was collected at a depth of 135 m.

== Biogeography ==
The large protoconch of L. doutei, shared with other Indian Ocean lyriniids, indicates that it hatches as a crawling juvenile with no intervening planctotrophic phase. This mode of development seems incompatible with long-range colonization of the Saya de Malha Bank alongside L. surinamensis, suggesting that the area was likely colonized by an ancestral species with smaller larvae, and later development of crawling larvae limited dispersal and led to the speciation of Mascarene Lyria.
