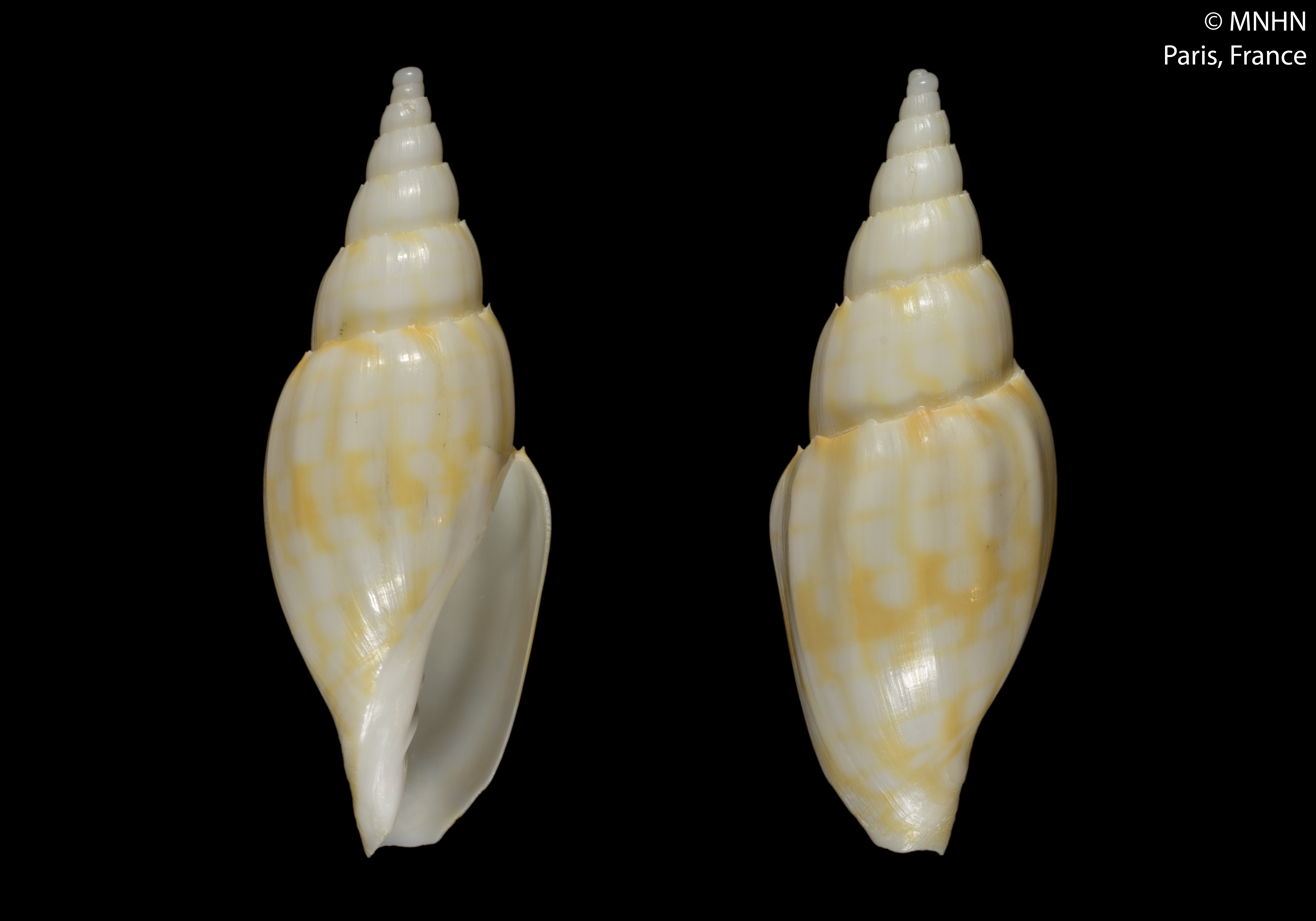
- Shell of Lyria bondarevi (holotype at MNHN, Paris)

Scientific classification
- Kingdom: Animalia
- Phylum: Mollusca
- Class: Gastropoda
- Subclass: Caenogastropoda
- Order: Neogastropoda
- Family: Volutidae
- Subfamily: Volutinae
- Tribe: Lyriini
- Genus: Lyria; Gray, 1847

Type species
- Voluta nucleus Lamarck, 1811

Synonyms
- Dallivoluta Okutani, 1982; Harpella Gray, 1858 (invalid: junior homonym of Harpella Schranck, 1802 [Lepidoptera]); Indolyria Bail & Poppe, 2001; Lyreneta Iredale, 1937; Lyria (Harpeola) Dall, 1907 · accepted, alternate representation; Lyria (Indolyria) Bail & Poppe, 2001 · accepted, alternate representation; Lyria (Lyria) Gray, 1847 · accepted, alternate representation; Lyria (Microlyria) Bail & Poppe, 2001 · accepted, alternate representation; Lyria (Mitraelyria) Bail & Poppe, 2001 · accepted, alternate representation; Lyria (Plicolyria) Bail & Poppe, 2001 · accepted, alternate representation; † Lyria (Pseudolyria) K. Martin, 1931 · accepted, alternate representation; † Lyria (Sannalyria) Pilsbry & Olsson, 1954 · accepted, alternate representation; Mitraelyria Bail & Poppe, 2001; † Otocheilus Conrad, 1865; Voluta (Lyria) Gray, 1847

= Lyria (gastropod) =

Genus of gastropods

Lyria is a genus of sea snails, marine gastropod molluscs in the family Volutidae.

== Description ==
The shell is small to medium sized, solid, stocky to elongate-fusiform. The radula is uniserial with tricuspid teeth. The protoconchs are smooth. They can be large and globose with a short calcarella or small and regularly coiled. The teleoconch shows axial ribs, exceptionally with true shoulder nodules.

The solid shell is ovately fusiform. The spire is acuminate. The whorls are longitudinally ribbed. The aperture is ovate. The columella shows numerous transverse plaits. The outer lip is simple and acute.

== Species ==
Species within the genus Lyria include:

- Lyria anna (Lesson, 1835)
- Lyria beauii (Fischer & Bernardi, 1857)
- Lyria boholensis Poppe, 1897
- Lyria bondarevi Bail & Poppe, 2004
- Lyria boucheti Bail & Poppe, 2004
- Lyria brianoi Poppe, 1999
- Lyria cassidula (Reeve, 1849)
- Lyria cleaveri Morrison, 2008
- Lyria cloveriana Weaver, 1963
- Lyria cordis Bayer, 1971
- † Lyria craticulata Darragh, 2017
- † Lyria degrangei Peyrot, 1928
- Lyria delessertiana (Petit de la Saussaye, 1842)
- Lyria deliciosa (Montrouzier, 1859)
- Lyria doutei Bouchet & Bail, 1992
- Lyria exorata Bouchet & Poppe, 1988
- Lyria grandidieri Bail, 2002
- Lyria grangei Cernohorsky, 1980
- Lyria guionneti Poppe & Conde, 2001
- † Lyria harpula (Lamarck, 1803)
- Lyria insignata Iredale, 1940
- Lyria kuniene Bouchet, 1979
- Lyria laseroni (Iredale, 1937)
- Lyria leonardi Emerson, 1985
- † Lyria lesbarritziana (Grateloup, 1845)
- Lyria leslieboschae Emerson & Sage, 1986
- Lyria lyraeformis (Swainson, 1821)
- † Lyria madrakahensis Harzhauser, 2007
- Lyria mallicki Ladd, 1975
- Lyria michardi Bail, 2009
- Lyria mikoi Kosuge, 1985
- Lyria mitraeformis (Lamarck, 1811)
- Lyria ogasawarana Bail & Chino, 2015
- † Lyria parens Sacco, 1890
- Lyria patbaili Bouchet, 1999
- Lyria pattersonia (Perry, 1811)
- Lyria pauljohnsoni Poppe & Terryn, 2002
- † Lyria peyrehoradensis Lozouet, 2019
- † Lyria picturata (Grateloup, 1834)
- Lyria planicostata (Sowerby III, 1903)
- Lyria poppei Bail, 2002
- † Lyria pulchella (G. B. Sowerby I, 1850)
- Lyria russjenseni Emerson, 1985
- Lyria sabaensis Bail, 1993
- Lyria solangeae Bozzetti, 2008
- Lyria surinamensis (Okutani, 1982)
- Lyria tulearensis Cosel & Blöcher, 1977
- Lyria vegai Clench & Turner, 1967
- † Lyria zelandica Finlay, 1924

Species brought into synonymy

- Subgenus Lyria (Enaeta) H. Adams & A. Adams, 1853: synonym of Enaeta H. Adams & A. Adams, 1853
- Lyria africana (Reeve, 1856): synonym of Festilyria africana (Reeve, 1856)
- Lyria aphrodite Bondarev, 1999: synonym of Callipara aphrodite (Bondarev, 1999)
- Lyria aturensis Peyrot, 1928 †: synonym of Lyria parens Sacco, 1890 †
- Lyria coquillensis F. E. Turner, 1938 †: synonym of Eovoluta coquillensis (F. E. Turner, 1938) † (original combination)
- Lyria dondani Angioy & Biraghi, 1982: synonym of Lyria mallicki Ladd, 1975
- Lyria guttata Reeve, 1849: synonym of Enaeta reevei (Dall, 1907)
- Lyria habei Okutani, 1979: synonym of Lyria mallicki Ladd, 1975
- Lyria harpa Barnes, 1824: synonym of Enaeta barnesii (Gray, 1825)
- Lyria howensis Iredale, 1940: synonym of Lyria deliciosa howensis Iredale, 1940 (original name)
- Lyria kawamurai Habe, 1975: synonym of Lyria planicostata (G. B. Sowerby III, 1903)
- Lyria kimberi Cotton, 1932: synonym of Lyria mitraeformis (Lamarck, 1811)
- Lyria leonardhilli Petuch, 1988: synonym of Enaeta leonardhilli (Petuch, 1988)
- Lyria nucleus (Lamarck, 1811): synonym of Lyria pattersonia (Perry, 1811)
- Lyria opposita Iredale, 1937: synonym of Lyria pattersonia (Perry, 1811)
- Lyria pedersenii Verrill, 1870: synonym of Enaeta cumingii (Broderip, 1832)
- Lyria peroniana Iredale, 1940: synonym of Lyria pattersonia (Perry, 1811)
- Lyria ponsonbyi (E. A. Smith, 1901): synonym of Festilyria ponsonbyi (E. A. Smith, 1801)
- Lyria queketti (E. A. Smith, 1901): synonym of Callipara queketti (E. A. Smith, 1901)
- Lyria reinai Angioy & Biraghi, 1981: synonym of Lyria mallicki Ladd, 1975
- Lyria santoensis Ladd, 1975: synonym of Lyria planicostata (G. B. Sowerby III, 1903)
- Lyria taiwanica Lan, 1975: synonym of Lyria planicostata (G. B. Sowerby III, 1903)
- Lyria valentina Bondarev, 1994: synonym of Lyria doutei Bouchet & Bail, 1991
- Lyria vicdani Kosuge, 1981: synonym of Lyria mallicki Ladd, 1975
