= Lyria (Microlyria) =

Scientific classification
- Kingdom: Animalia
- Phylum: Mollusca
- Class: Gastropoda
- Subclass: Caenogastropoda
- Order: Neogastropoda
- Family: Volutidae
- Genus: Lyria
- Subgenus: Microlyria; Bail & Poppe, 2001

Subgenus of gastropods

Microlyria is a subgenus of sea snail, a marine gastropod mollusc in the family Volutidae.
