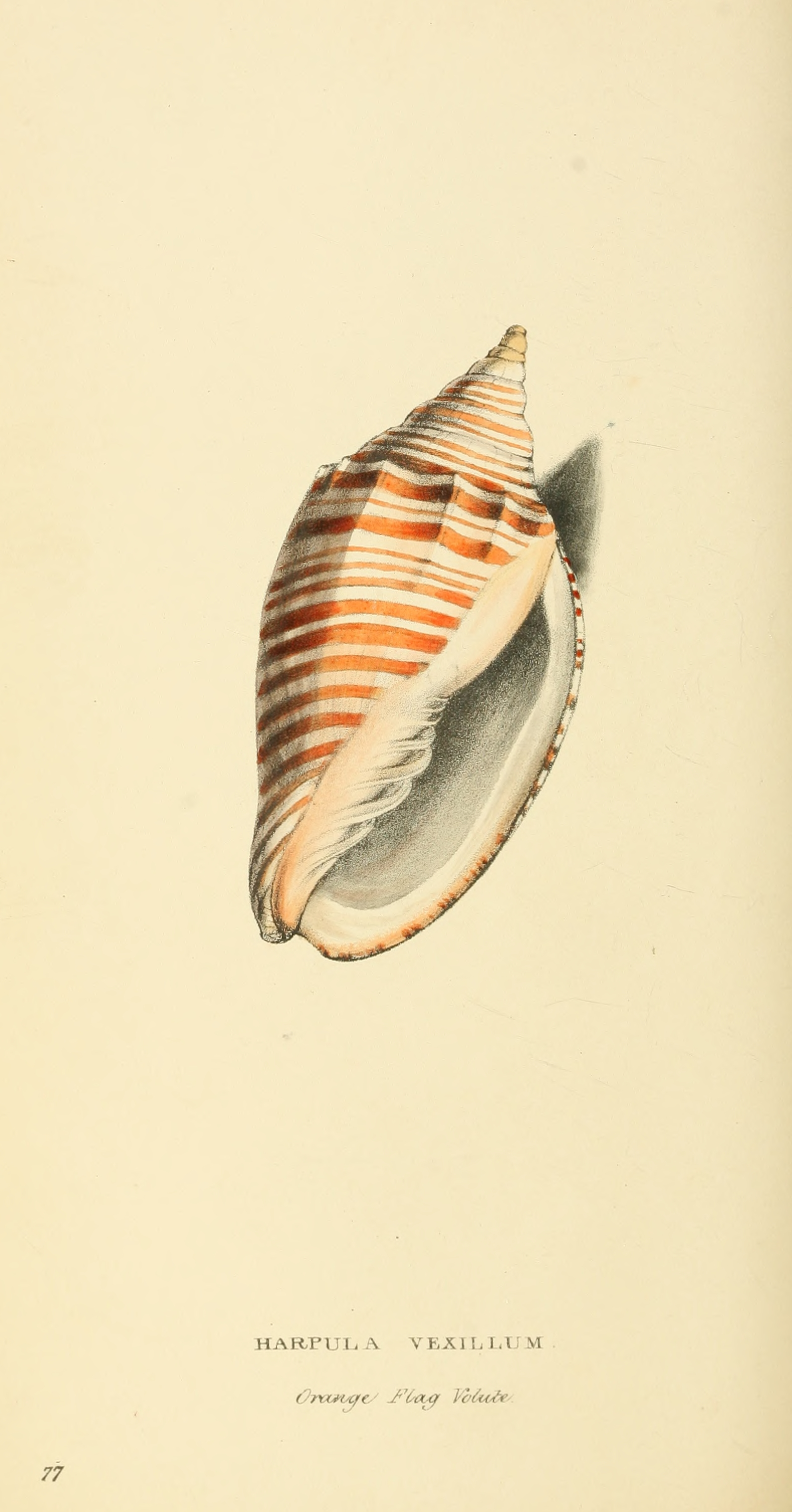
- Harpulina arausiaca shell

Scientific classification
- Kingdom: Animalia
- Phylum: Mollusca
- Class: Gastropoda
- Subclass: Caenogastropoda
- Order: Neogastropoda
- Family: Volutidae
- Genus: Harpulina; Dall, 1906

Type species
- Voluta arausiaca Lightfoot, 1786

Synonyms
- Harpulla Swainson, 1831

= Harpulina =

Genus of gastropods

Harpulina is a genus of sea snails, marine gastropod mollusks in the family Volutidae.

== Distribution ==
Restricted to Sri Lanka and the southern tip of the Indian Peninsula

== Species ==
Species within the genus Harpulina include:

- Harpulina arausiaca (Lightfoot, 1786)
- Harpulina lapponica (Linnaeus, 1767)
- Harpulina loroisi (Valenciennes, 1863)

Species brought inro synonymy

- Harpulina diannae T. Cossignani, Allary & P. G. Stimpson, 2021: synonym of Harpulina lapponica (Linnaeus, 1767)
- Harpulina harpa (Swainson, 1835): synonym of Lyria anna (Lesson, 1835)
- Harpulina japonica Shikama & Horikoshi, 1963: synonym of Harpulina lapponica (Linnaeus, 1767)
- Harpulina stimpsonorum T. Cossignani & Allary, 2020: synonym of Harpulina lapponica (Linnaeus, 1767)
