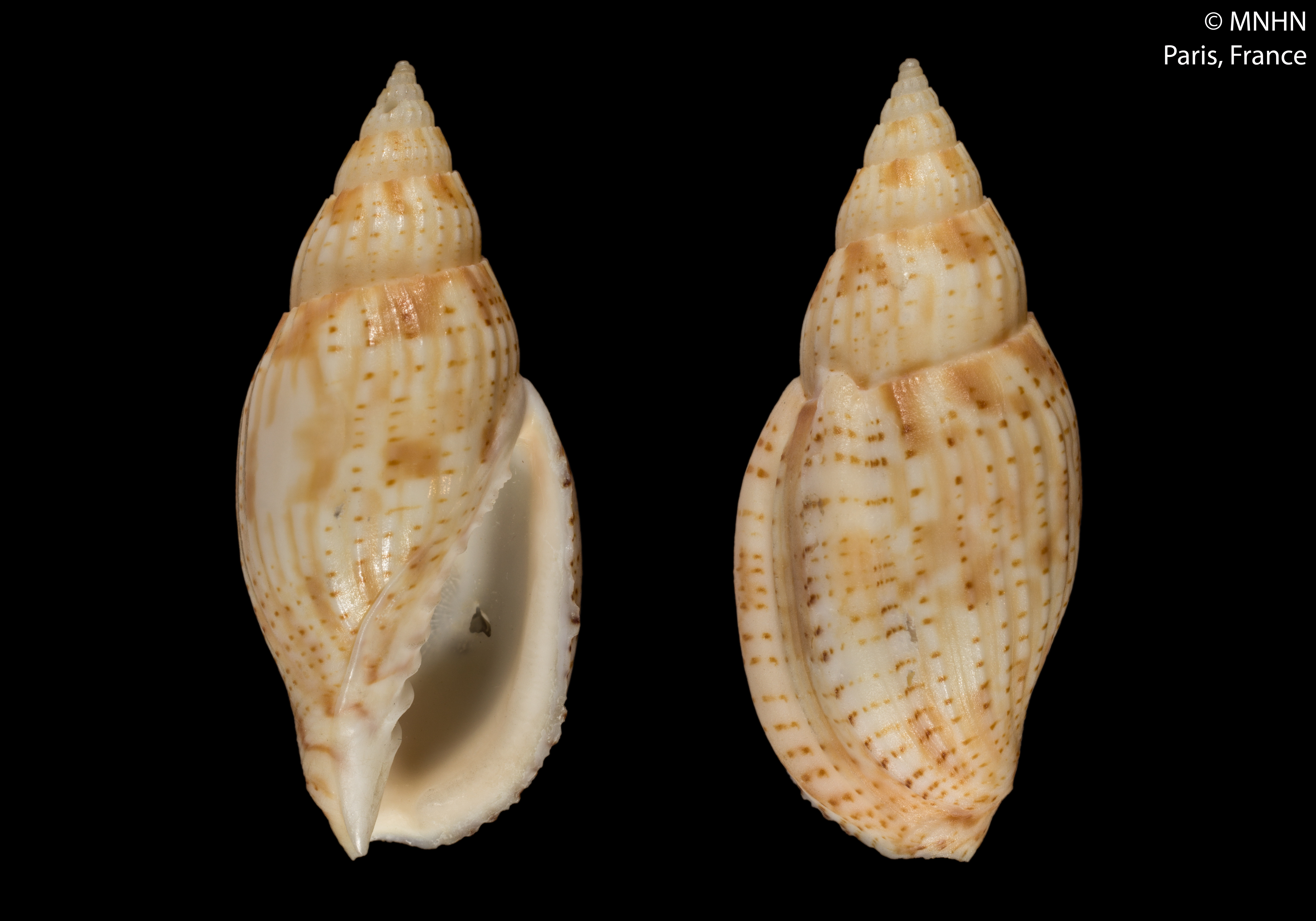

Scientific classification
- Kingdom: Animalia
- Phylum: Mollusca
- Class: Gastropoda
- Subclass: Caenogastropoda
- Order: Neogastropoda
- Family: Volutidae
- Genus: Lyria
- Species: L. sabaensis

Binomial name
- Lyria sabaensis Bail, 1993

Synonyms
- Lyria (Mitraelyria) beauii sabaensis Bail, 1993 (original combination); Lyria (Mitraelyria) sabaensis Bail, 1993· accepted, alternate representation

= Lyria sabaensis =

Species of gastropod

Lyria sabaensis is a species of sea snail, a marine gastropod mollusk in the family Volutidae, the volutes.
