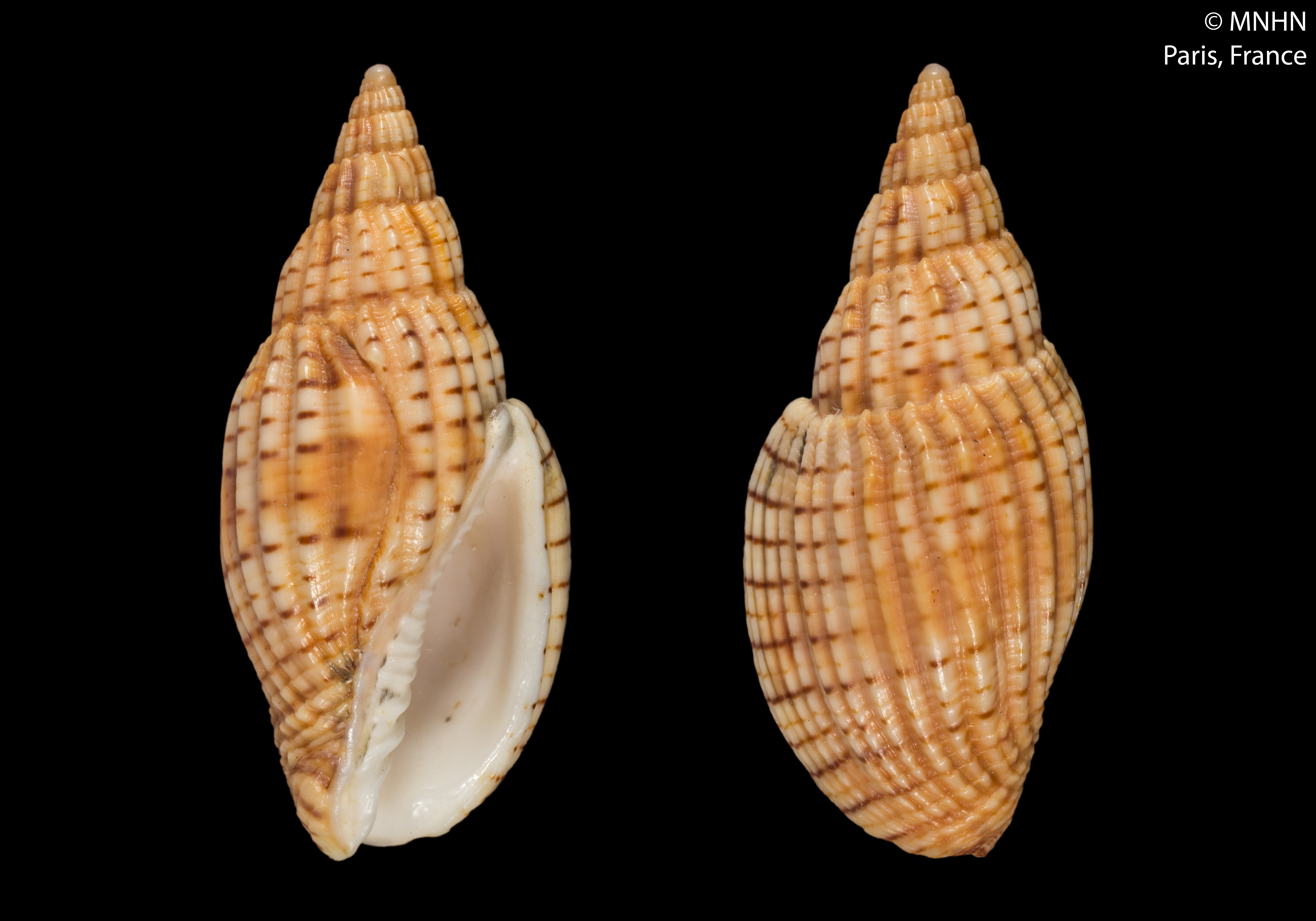
- Shell of Lyria michardi (holotype at MNHN, Paris)

Scientific classification
- Kingdom: Animalia
- Phylum: Mollusca
- Class: Gastropoda
- Subclass: Caenogastropoda
- Order: Neogastropoda
- Family: Volutidae
- Genus: Lyria
- Species: L. michardi

Binomial name
- Lyria michardi Bail, 2009

Synonyms
- Lyria (Indolyria) michardi Bail, 2009· accepted, alternate representation

= Lyria michardi =

Species of gastropod

Lyria michardi is a species of sea snail, a marine gastropod mollusk in the family Volutidae, the volutes.

== Description ==
Lyria michardi is a large species, reaching up to 50 mm in length. The shell is a glossy white with brown spiral bands. The aperture is large and oval. The spire is high and conical. The siphonal canal is long and slender.

Lyria michardi is found in the Indo-Pacific region, from Madagascar to the Philippines. It is a deep-water species, living at depths of 100 to 500 m.

The diet of Lyria michardi is not well known, but it is thought to eat other gastropods. It is a predatory snail, and uses its long siphonal canal to suck up its prey.

Lyria michardi is a prized shell among collectors. It is a rare and beautiful species, and can fetch high prices. The shell is sometimes called the "Madagascar Volute" or the "Michardi Volute".

The species was first described by Bail in 2009.

The shell is thought to be threatened by overfishing.

Lyria michardi is a hermaphroditic species, meaning that each individual snail has both male and female reproductive organs.

== Distribution ==
This marine species occurs off Southern Madagascar.
