= Lyria surinamensis =

Scientific classification
- Kingdom: Animalia
- Phylum: Mollusca
- Class: Gastropoda
- Subclass: Caenogastropoda
- Order: Neogastropoda
- Family: Volutidae
- Genus: Lyria
- Species: L. surinamensis

Binomial name
- Lyria surinamensis (Okutani,1982)

Species of gastropod

Lyria surinamensis is a species of sea snail, a marine gastropod mollusk in the family Volutidae, the volutes.

== Description ==
The shell size 90 to 95 mm. Originally described as Dallivoluta surinamensis, Okutani regarded the species to be allied with Tractolira and particularly with Fulgoraria. Bouchet and Bail suggested that it was more properly classified under the genus Lyria, noting its resemblance to Lyria lyraeformis.

== Distribution ==
The species occurs in the Saya de Malha Bank, in the Indian Ocean. It was originally described by Okutani based on a specimen collected by the Japanese Marine Fishery Resources Research Center, erroneously labeled as being from Suriname (hence its specific epithet). In the 1990s, specimens collected by Soviet research vessels on the Saya de Malha Bank confirmed the species' true origin, further supported by its resemblance to other East African lyriniids.
