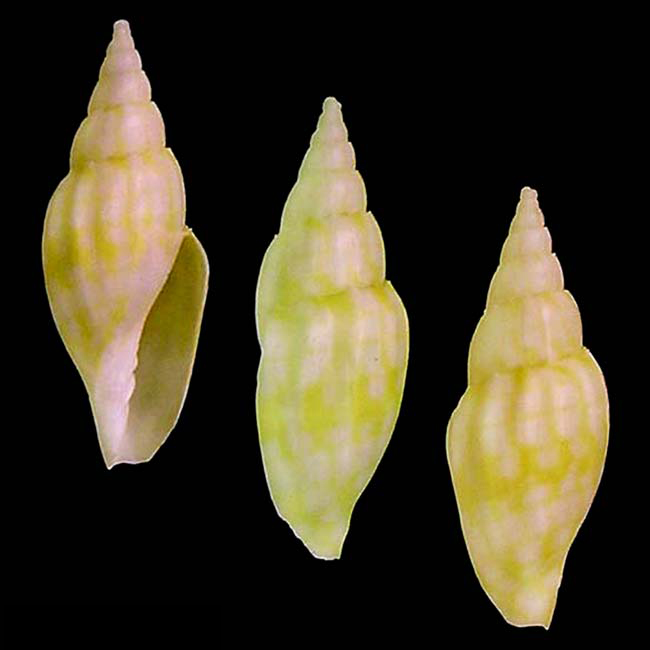
- Shell of Lyria bondarevi

Scientific classification
- Kingdom: Animalia
- Phylum: Mollusca
- Class: Gastropoda
- Subclass: Caenogastropoda
- Order: Neogastropoda
- Family: Volutidae
- Genus: Lyria
- Species: L. bondarevi

Binomial name
- Lyria bondarevi Bail & Poppe, 2004

Synonyms
- Indolyria bondarevi (Bail & Poppe, 2004); Lyria (Indolyria) bondarevi Bail & Poppe, 2004· accepted, alternate representation

= Lyria bondarevi =

Species of gastropod

Lyria bondarevi is a species of sea snail, a marine gastropod mollusk in the family Volutidae, the volutes.

== Description ==
The length of the shell attains 91.8 mm.

== Distribution ==
This marine species occurs off the Mascarenes.
