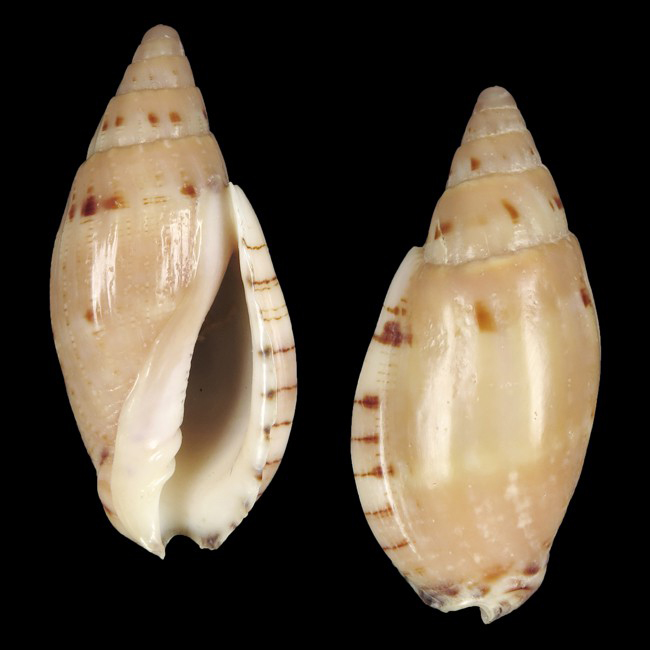
- Shell of Lyria pauljohnsoni (holotype at MNHN, Paris)

Scientific classification
- Kingdom: Animalia
- Phylum: Mollusca
- Class: Gastropoda
- Subclass: Caenogastropoda
- Order: Neogastropoda
- Family: Volutidae
- Genus: Lyria
- Species: L. pauljohnsoni

Binomial name
- Lyria pauljohnsoni Poppe & Terryn, 2002

Synonyms
- Indolyria pauljohnsoni (Poppe & Terryn, 2002); Lyria (Indolyria) pauljohnsoni Poppe & Terryn, 2002· accepted, alternate representation

= Lyria pauljohnsoni =

Species of gastropod

Lyria pauljohnsoni is a species of sea snail, a marine gastropod mollusk in the family Volutidae, the volutes.

== Description ==
The length of the shell attains 35–45 mm.

== Distribution ==
This marine species occurs off Madagascar.
