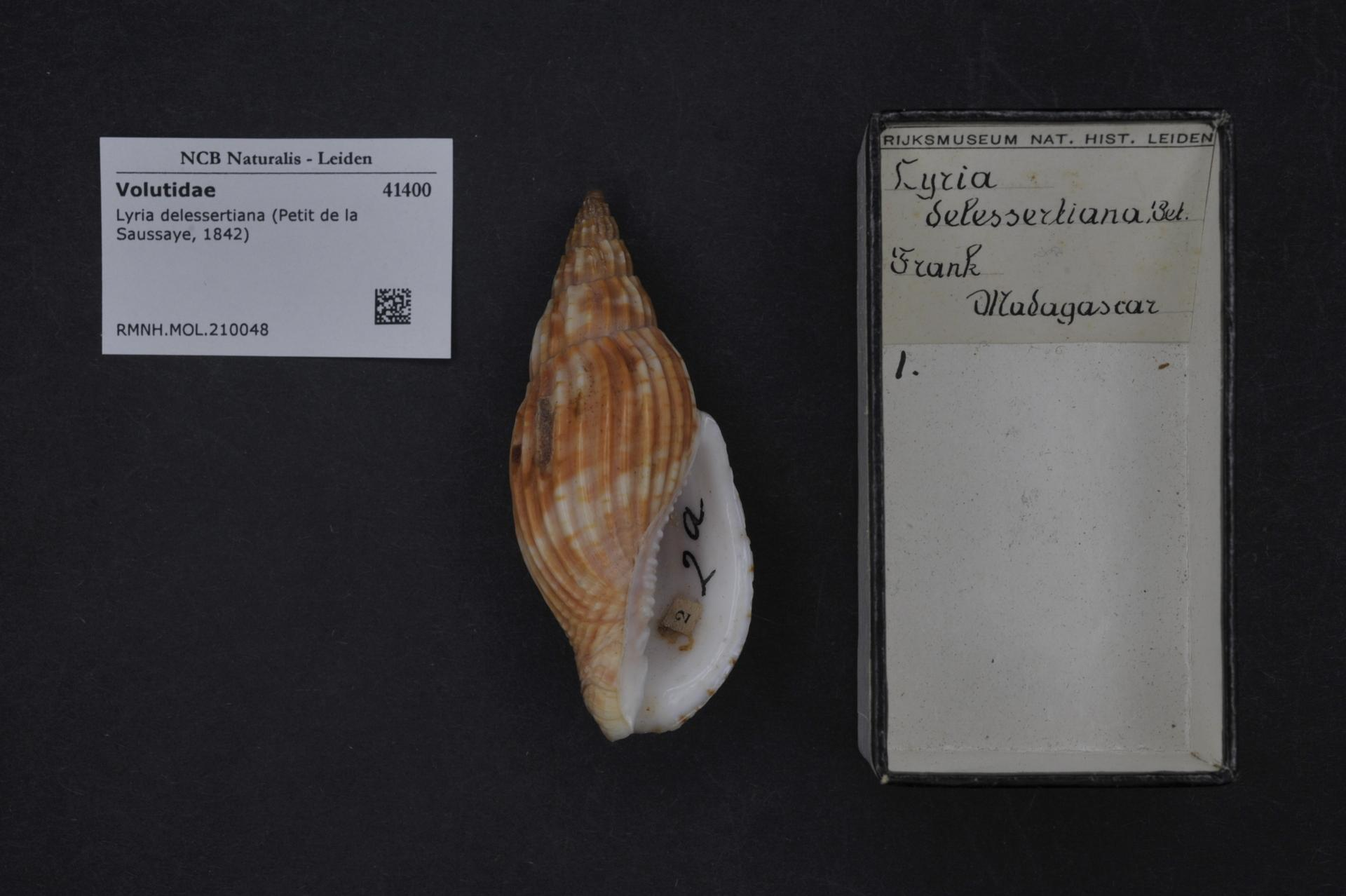

Scientific classification
- Kingdom: Animalia
- Phylum: Mollusca
- Class: Gastropoda
- Subclass: Caenogastropoda
- Order: Neogastropoda
- Family: Volutidae
- Genus: Lyria
- Species: L. delessertiana

Binomial name
- Lyria delessertiana (Petit de La Saussaye,1842)

= Lyria delessertiana =

Species of gastropod

Lyria delessertiana is a species of sea snail, a marine gastropod mollusk in the family Volutidae, the volutes. It shell size is 60 mm (2.4 in), and it is endemic to Madagascar.
