= Lyria laseroni =

Scientific classification
- Kingdom: Animalia
- Phylum: Mollusca
- Class: Gastropoda
- Subclass: Caenogastropoda
- Order: Neogastropoda
- Family: Volutidae
- Genus: Lyria
- Species: L. laseroni

Binomial name
- Lyria laseroni (Iredale,1937)

Synonyms
- Voluta (Callipara) brazieri Cox, 1873

Species of gastropod

Lyria laseroni is a species of sea snail, a marine gastropod mollusk in the family Volutidae, the volutes.
