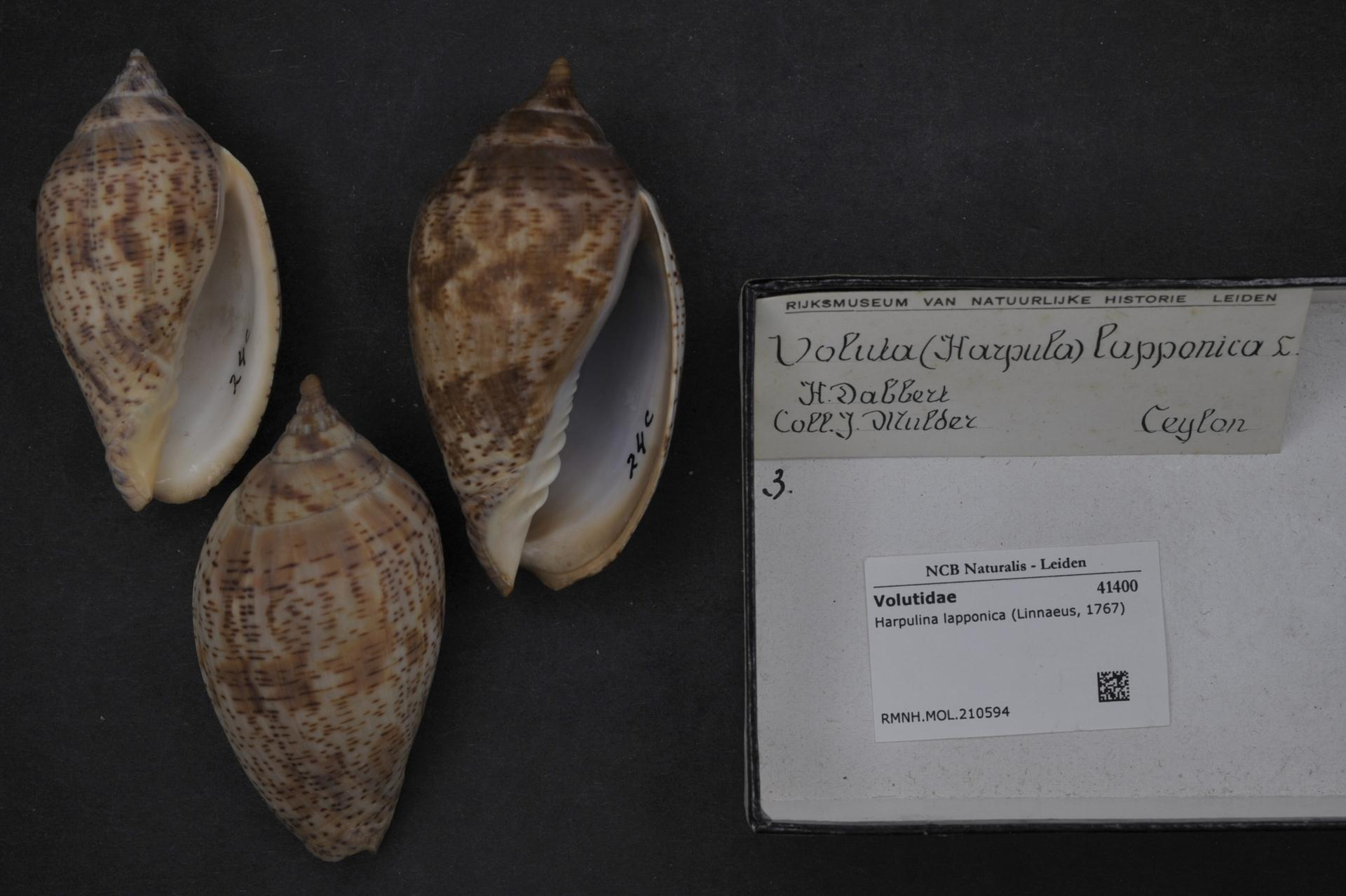
- Specimens of Harpulina lapponica lapponica at the Naturalis Biodiversity Center

Scientific classification
- Kingdom: Animalia
- Phylum: Mollusca
- Class: Gastropoda
- Subclass: Caenogastropoda
- Order: Neogastropoda
- Family: Volutidae
- Genus: Harpulina
- Species: H. lapponica

Binomial name
- Harpulina lapponica (Linnaeus, 1767)

Synonyms
- Harpulina japonica Shikama & Horikoshi, 1963; Harpulina lapponica lapponica (Linnaeus, 1767)· accepted, alternate representation; Voluta indica Sowerby I, 1845; Voluta interpuncta Reeve, 1849; Voluta interpuncta undata M. Smith, 1942; Voluta lapponica Linnaeus, 1767

= Harpulina lapponica =

Species of gastropod

Harpulina lapponica is a species of sea snail, a marine gastropod mollusk in the family Volutidae, the volutes.

== Subspecies ==
- Harpulina lapponica lapponica (Linnaeus, 1767)
- Harpulina lapponica loroisi (Valenciennes, 1863)

== Description ==
The length of the shell attains 79 mm.

== Distribution ==
This marine species is native to the Indian Ocean, particularly Sri Lanka. Despite the specific epithet lapponica, it is not native to Lapland.
