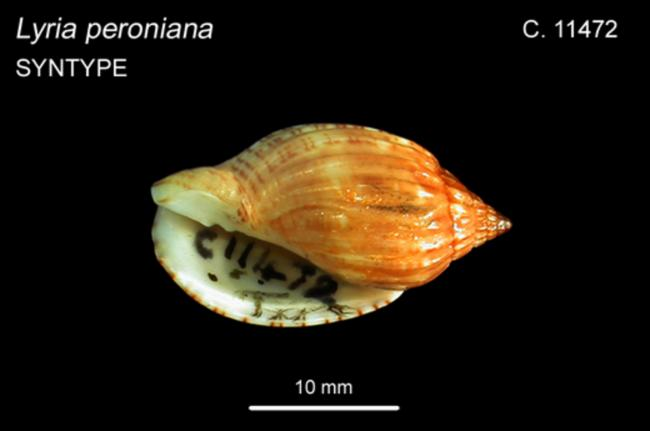

Scientific classification
- Kingdom: Animalia
- Phylum: Mollusca
- Class: Gastropoda
- Subclass: Caenogastropoda
- Order: Neogastropoda
- Family: Volutidae
- Genus: Lyria
- Species: L. pattersonia

Binomial name
- Lyria pattersonia (Perry,1811)

Synonyms
- Lyria nucleus Lamarck, 1811; Lyria opposita Iredale,1937; Lyria peroniana Iredale,1940; Voluta harpa Mawe,1823; Voluta nucleus Lamarck, 1811; Voluta perdicina Megerle,1829

= Lyria pattersonia =

Species of gastropod

Lyria pattersonia is a species of sea snail, a marine gastropod mollusk in the family Volutidae, the volutes.
