= Lyria tulearensis =

Scientific classification
- Kingdom: Animalia
- Phylum: Mollusca
- Class: Gastropoda
- Subclass: Caenogastropoda
- Order: Neogastropoda
- Family: Volutidae
- Genus: Lyria
- Species: L. tulearensis

Binomial name
- Lyria tulearensis Cosel & Blöcher, 1977

Species of gastropod

Lyria tulearensis is a species of sea snail, a marine gastropod mollusk in the family Volutidae, the volutes. Its shell size is 600 mm, and it can be found in Madagascar.
