= Lyria vegai =

Scientific classification
- Kingdom: Animalia
- Phylum: Mollusca
- Class: Gastropoda
- Subclass: Caenogastropoda
- Order: Neogastropoda
- Family: Volutidae
- Genus: Lyria
- Species: L. vegai

Binomial name
- Lyria vegai Clench & Turner,1967

Species of gastropod

Lyria vegai is a species of sea snail, a marine gastropod mollusk in the family Volutidae, the volutes.
