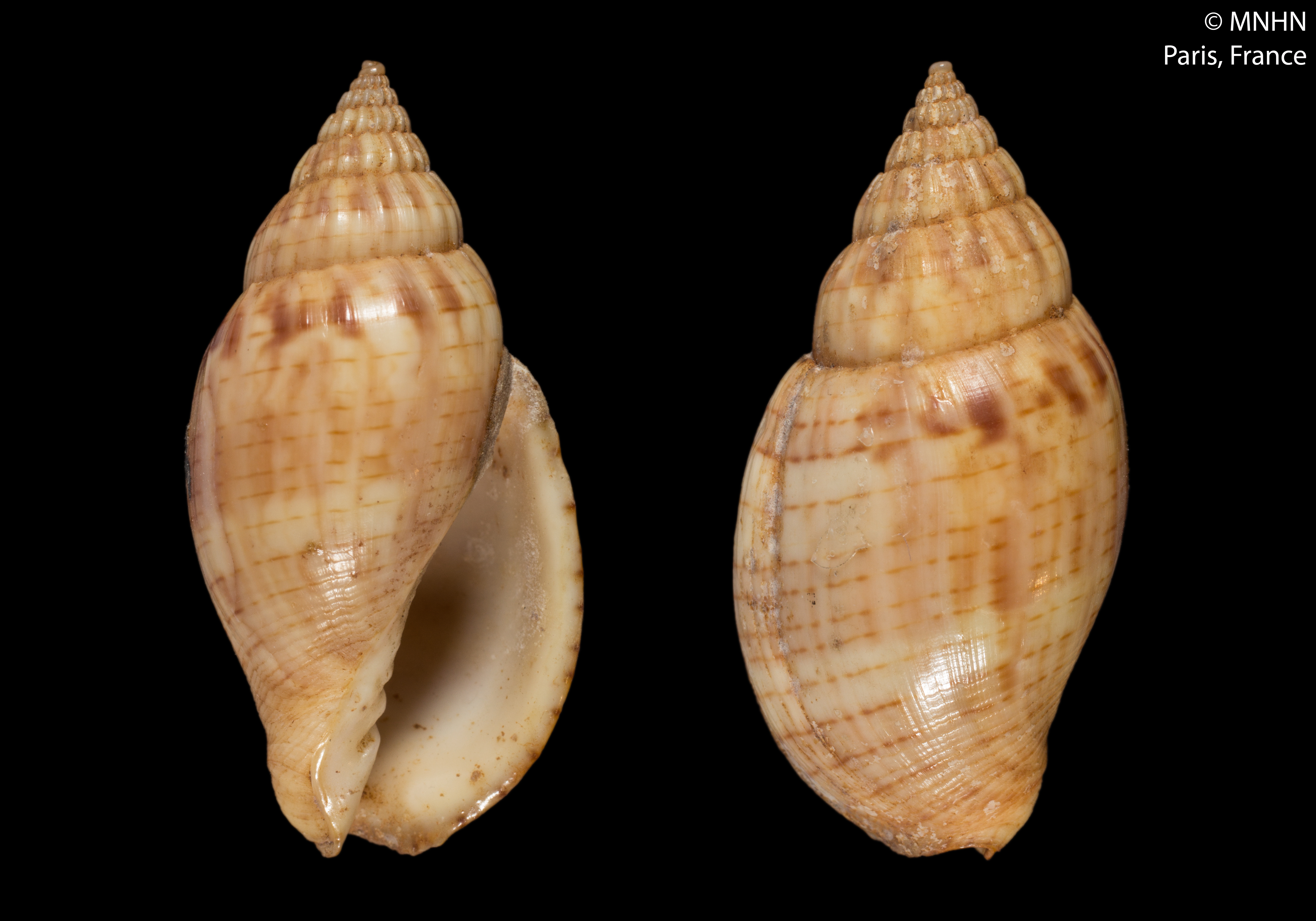
- Shell of Lyria deliciosa (syntype at MNHN, Paris)

Scientific classification
- Kingdom: Animalia
- Phylum: Mollusca
- Class: Gastropoda
- Subclass: Caenogastropoda
- Order: Neogastropoda
- Family: Volutidae
- Genus: Lyria
- Species: L. deliciosa

Binomial name
- Lyria deliciosa (Montrouzier,1859)

Synonyms
- Lyria (Lyria) deliciosa (Montrouzier, 1859)· accepted, alternate representation; Lyria (Lyria) deliciosa deliciosa (Montrouzier, 1859)· accepted, alternate representation; Lyria deliciosa deliciosa (Montrouzier, 1859)· accepted, alternate representation; Voluta deliciosa Montrouzier, 1859 (original combination)

= Lyria deliciosa =

Species of gastropod

Lyria deliciosa is a species of sea snail, a marine gastropod mollusk in the family Volutidae, the volutes.

== Description ==
The length of the shell attains 30 mm.

== Distribution ==
This marine species occurs off New Caledonia.
