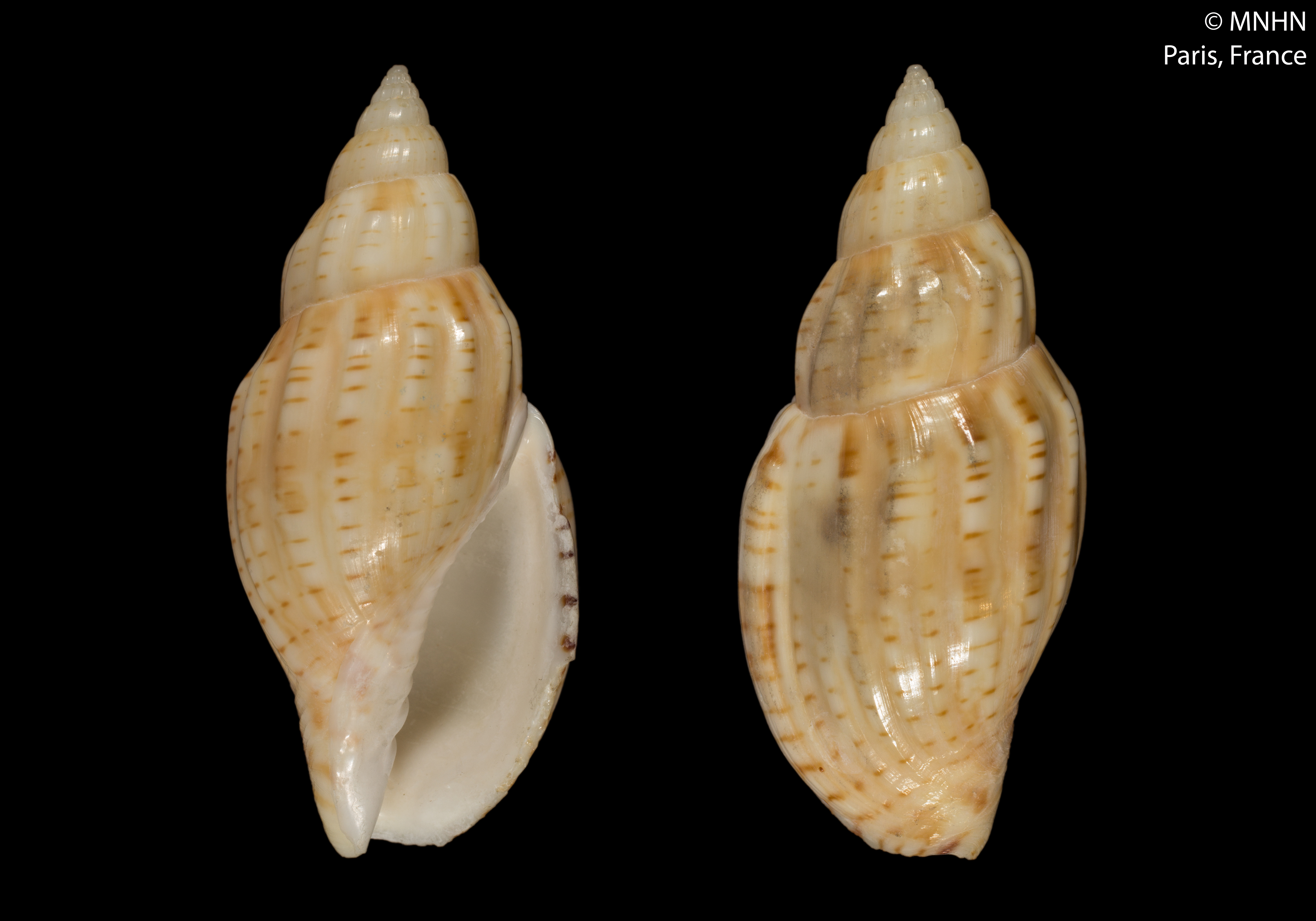

Scientific classification
- Kingdom: Animalia
- Phylum: Mollusca
- Class: Gastropoda
- Subclass: Caenogastropoda
- Order: Neogastropoda
- Family: Volutidae
- Genus: Lyria
- Species: L. beauii

Binomial name
- Lyria beauii (Fischer & Bernardi,1857)

Synonyms
- Lyria (Mitraelyria) beauii (P. Fischer & Bernardi, 1857)· accepted, alternate representation; Voluta beauii P. Fischer & Bernardi, 1857 (original combination)

= Lyria beauii =

Species of gastropod

Lyria beauii is a species of sea snail, a marine gastropod mollusk in the family Volutidae, the volutes.

== Description ==
The length of the shell attains 70 mm.

== Distribution ==
This uncommon marine species occurs off Guadeloupe, French West Indies, Antilles.
