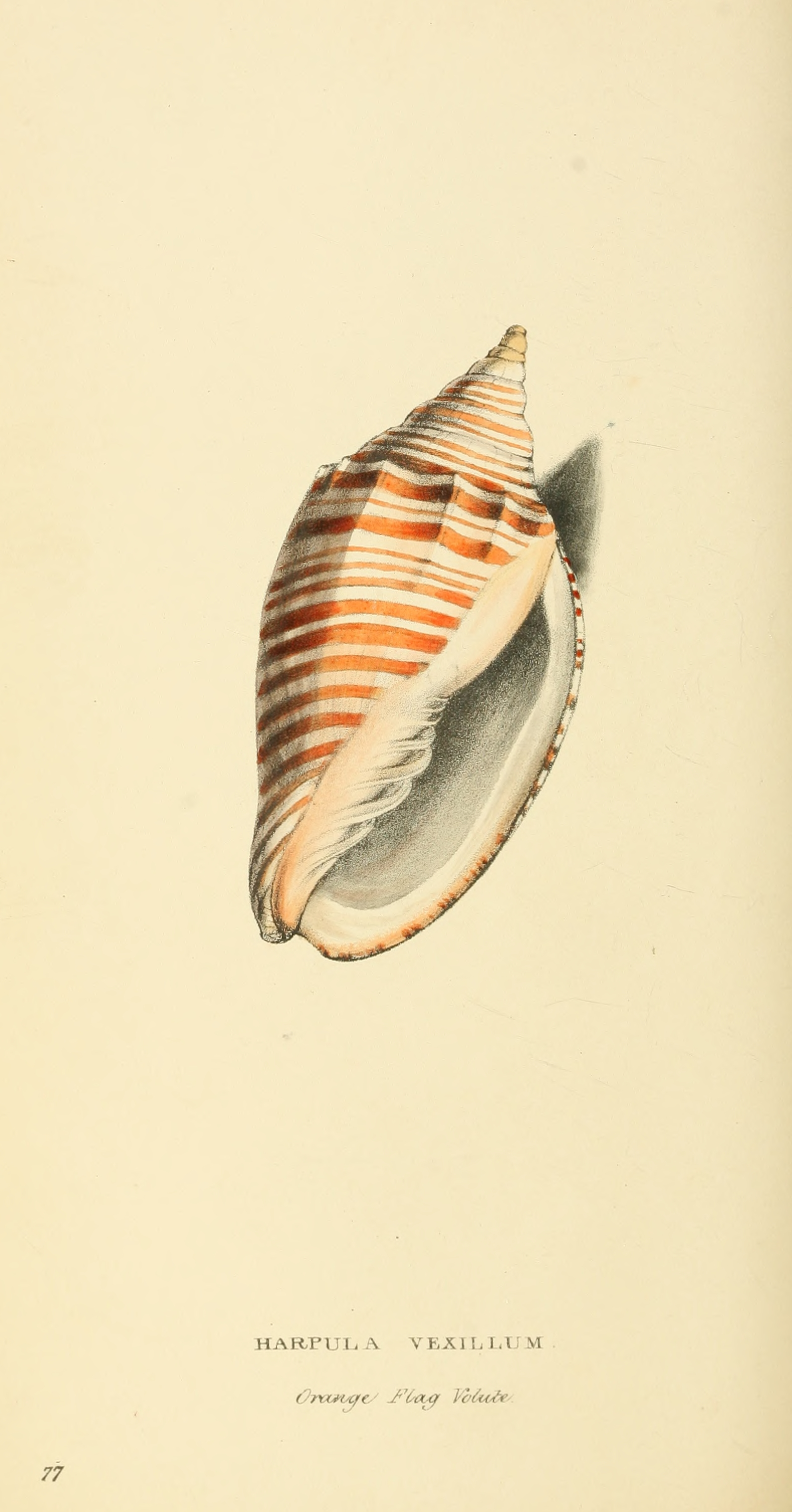
- Harpulina arausiaca shell

Scientific classification
- Kingdom: Animalia
- Phylum: Mollusca
- Class: Gastropoda
- Subclass: Caenogastropoda
- Order: Neogastropoda
- Family: Volutidae
- Genus: Harpulina
- Species: H. arausiaca

Binomial name
- Harpulina arausiaca (Lightfoot, 1786)

Synonyms
- Voluta vexillum Gmelin, 1791

= Harpulina arausiaca =

Gold-banded volute

Species of gastropod

Harpulina arausiaca, common name the gold-banded volute, is a species of sea snail, a marine gastropod mollusk in the family Volutidae, the volutes.
