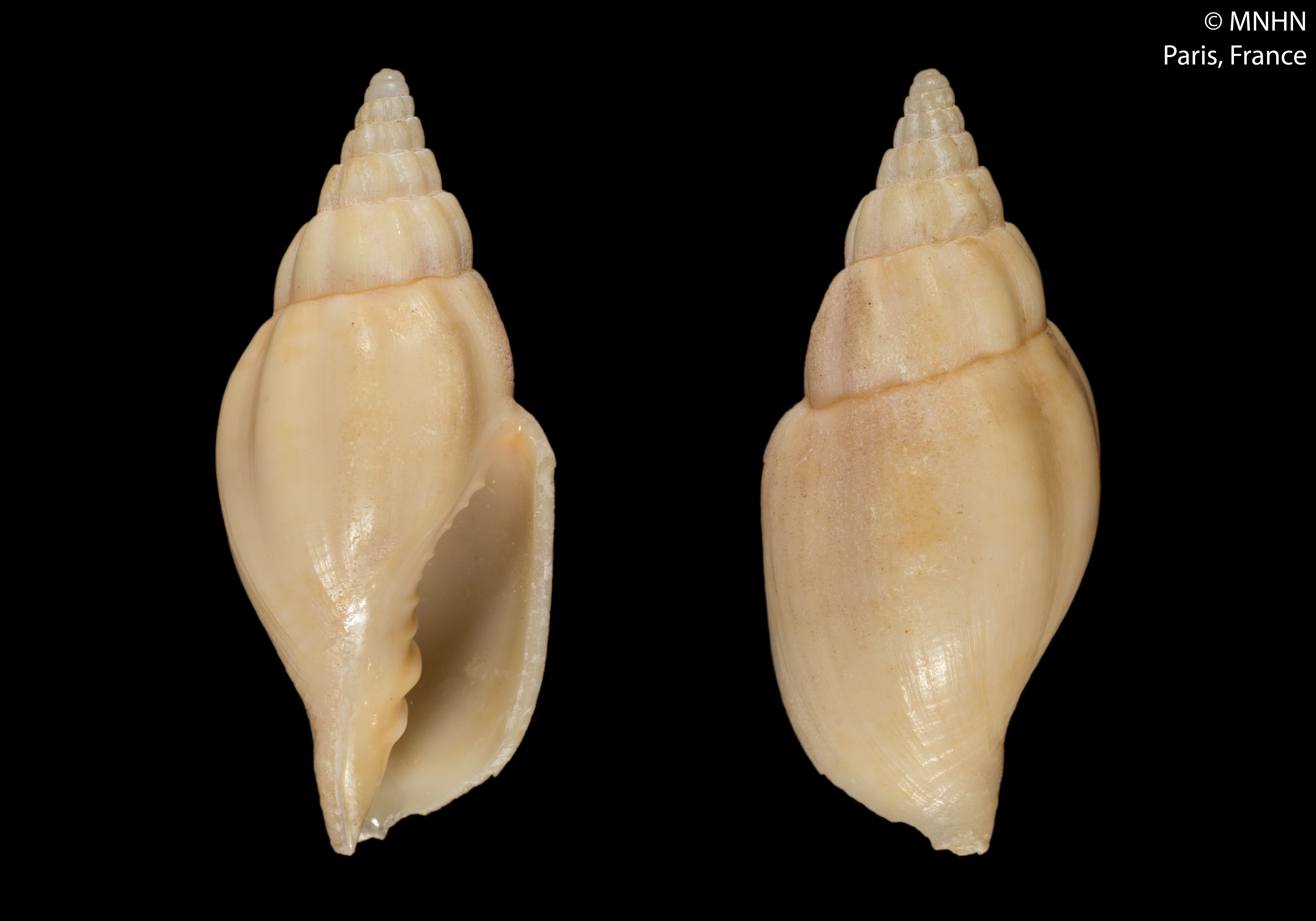
- Shell of Lyria grandidieri (holotype at MNHN. Paris)

Scientific classification
- Kingdom: Animalia
- Phylum: Mollusca
- Class: Gastropoda
- Subclass: Caenogastropoda
- Order: Neogastropoda
- Family: Volutidae
- Genus: Lyria
- Species: L. grandidieri

Binomial name
- Lyria grandidieri Bail, 2002

Synonyms
- Lyria (Plicolyria) grandidieri Bail, 2002

= Lyria grandidieri =

Species of gastropod

Lyria grandidieri is a species of sea snail, a marine gastropod mollusk in the family Volutidae, the volutes.

== Description ==
The length of the shell attains 37 mm.

== Distribution ==
One of the rarest of the Lyria, this marine species is found near New Caledonia.
