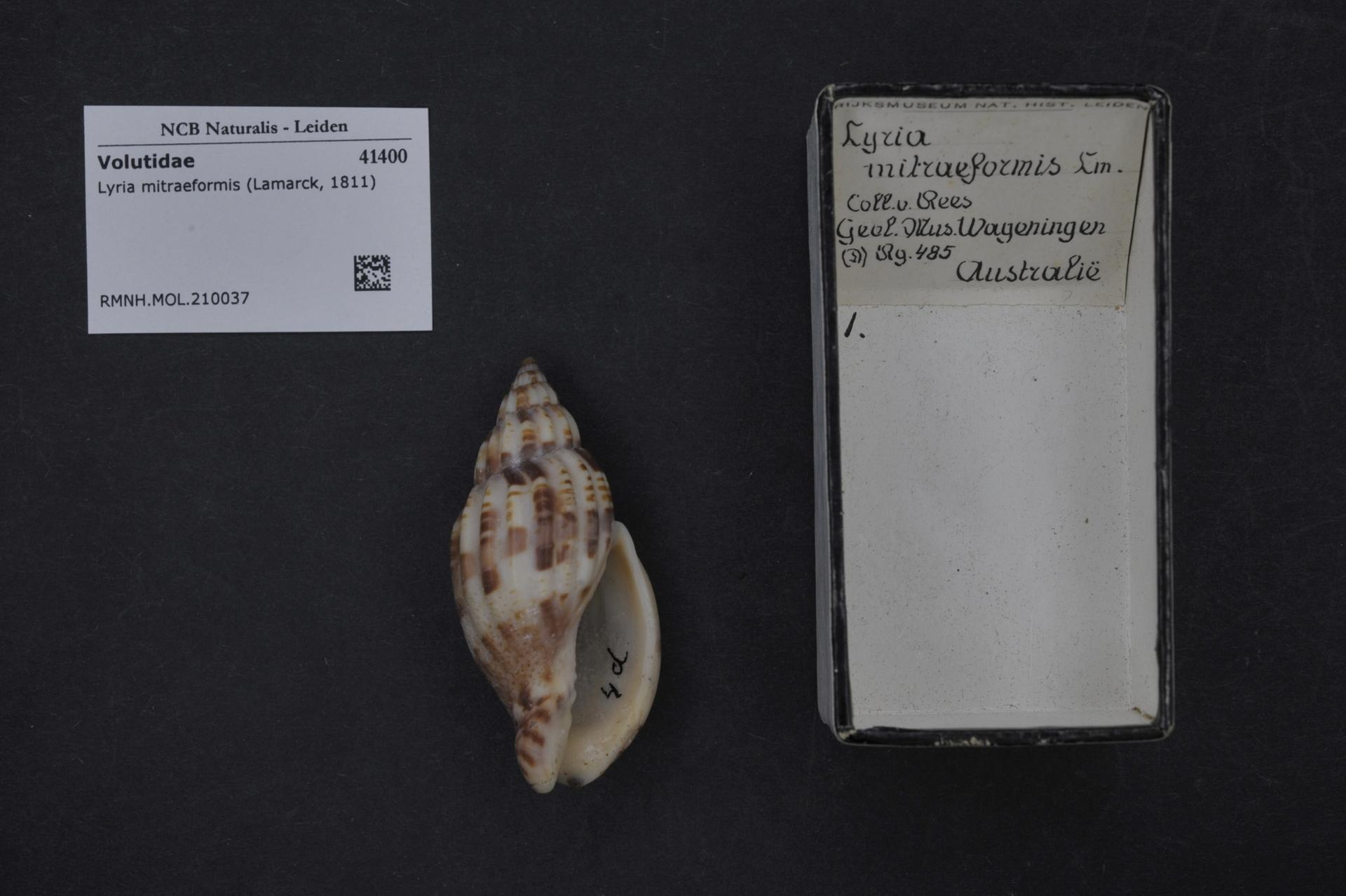
- Lyria mitraeformis shell

Scientific classification
- Kingdom: Animalia
- Phylum: Mollusca
- Class: Gastropoda
- Subclass: Caenogastropoda
- Order: Neogastropoda
- Family: Volutidae
- Genus: Lyria
- Species: L. mitraeformis

Binomial name
- Lyria mitraeformis (Lamarck, 1811)

Synonyms
- Lyria kimberi Cotton, 1932; Lyria lyriformis Broderip, 1865; Voluta grangeri Sowerby,1900; Voluta multicostata Broderip, 1827

= Lyria mitraeformis =

Species of gastropod

Lyria mitraeformis is a species of sea snail, a marine gastropod mollusk in the family Volutidae, the volutes.
