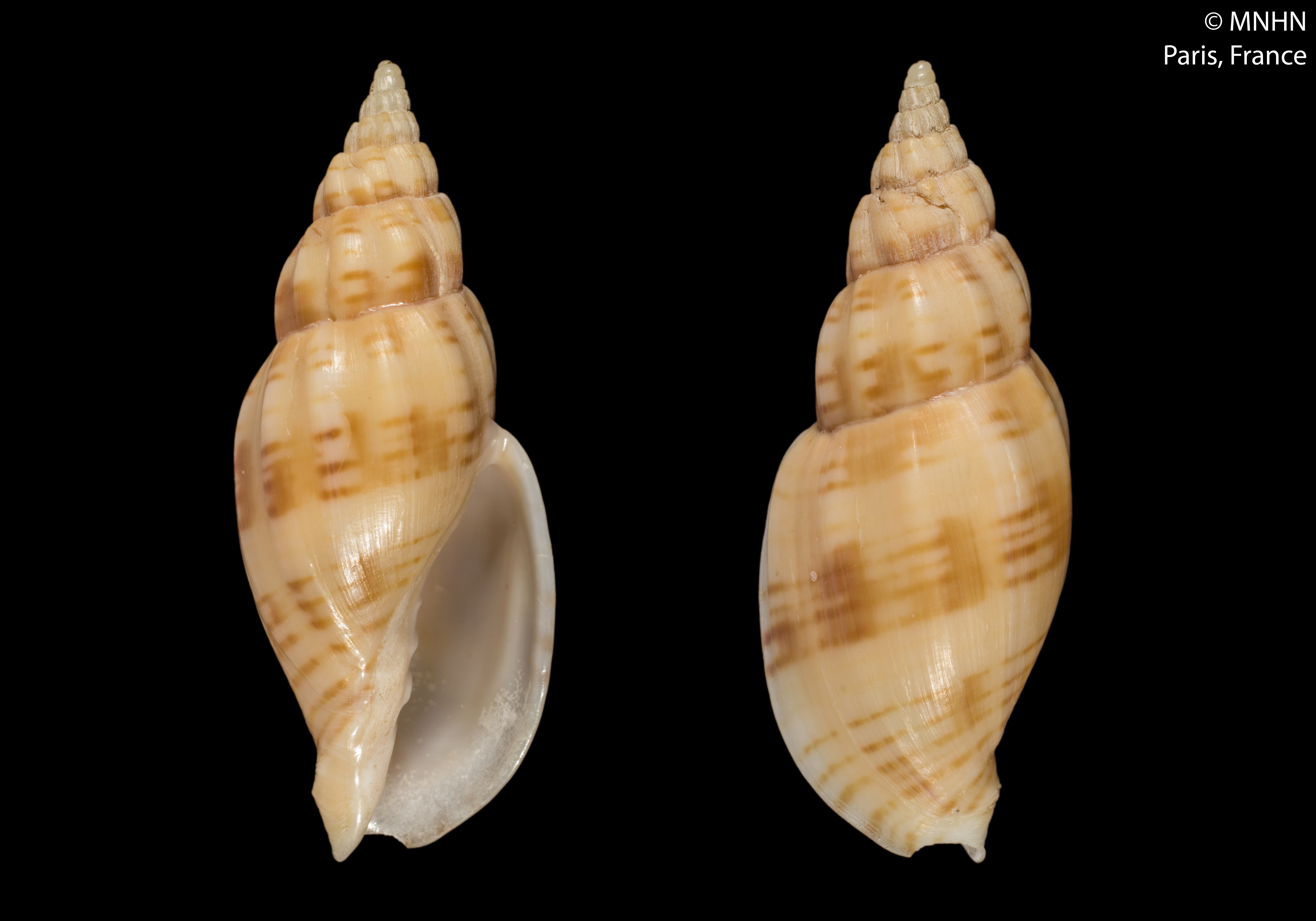
- Shell of Lyria poppei (holotype at MNHN, Paris)

Scientific classification
- Kingdom: Animalia
- Phylum: Mollusca
- Class: Gastropoda
- Subclass: Caenogastropoda
- Order: Neogastropoda
- Family: Volutidae
- Genus: Lyria
- Species: L. poppei

Binomial name
- Lyria poppei Bail, 2002

Synonyms
- Lyria (Plicolyria) poppei Bail, 2002· accepted, alternate representation

= Lyria poppei =

Species of sea snail

Lyria poppei is a species of sea snail, a marine gastropod mollusk in the family Volutidae, the volutes.

== Description ==
The length of the shell attains 42.2 mm.

== Distribution ==
This marine species occurs off the Norfolk Ridge, New Caledonia.
