= Enaeta cylleniformis =

Scientific classification
- Kingdom: Animalia
- Phylum: Mollusca
- Class: Gastropoda
- Subclass: Caenogastropoda
- Order: Neogastropoda
- Family: Volutidae
- Genus: Enaeta
- Species: E. cylleniformis

Binomial name
- Enaeta cylleniformis (Sowerby I, 1844)

Species of gastropod

Enaeta cylleniformis is a species of sea snail, a marine gastropod mollusk in the family Volutidae, the volutes.
