= Lyria patbaili =

Scientific classification
- Kingdom: Animalia
- Phylum: Mollusca
- Class: Gastropoda
- Subclass: Caenogastropoda
- Order: Neogastropoda
- Family: Volutidae
- Genus: Lyria
- Species: L. patbaili

Binomial name
- Lyria patbaili Bouchet, 1999

Synonyms
- Indolyria patbaili (Bouchet, 1999); Lyria (Indolyria) patbaili Bouchet, 1999· accepted, alternate representation

Species of gastropod

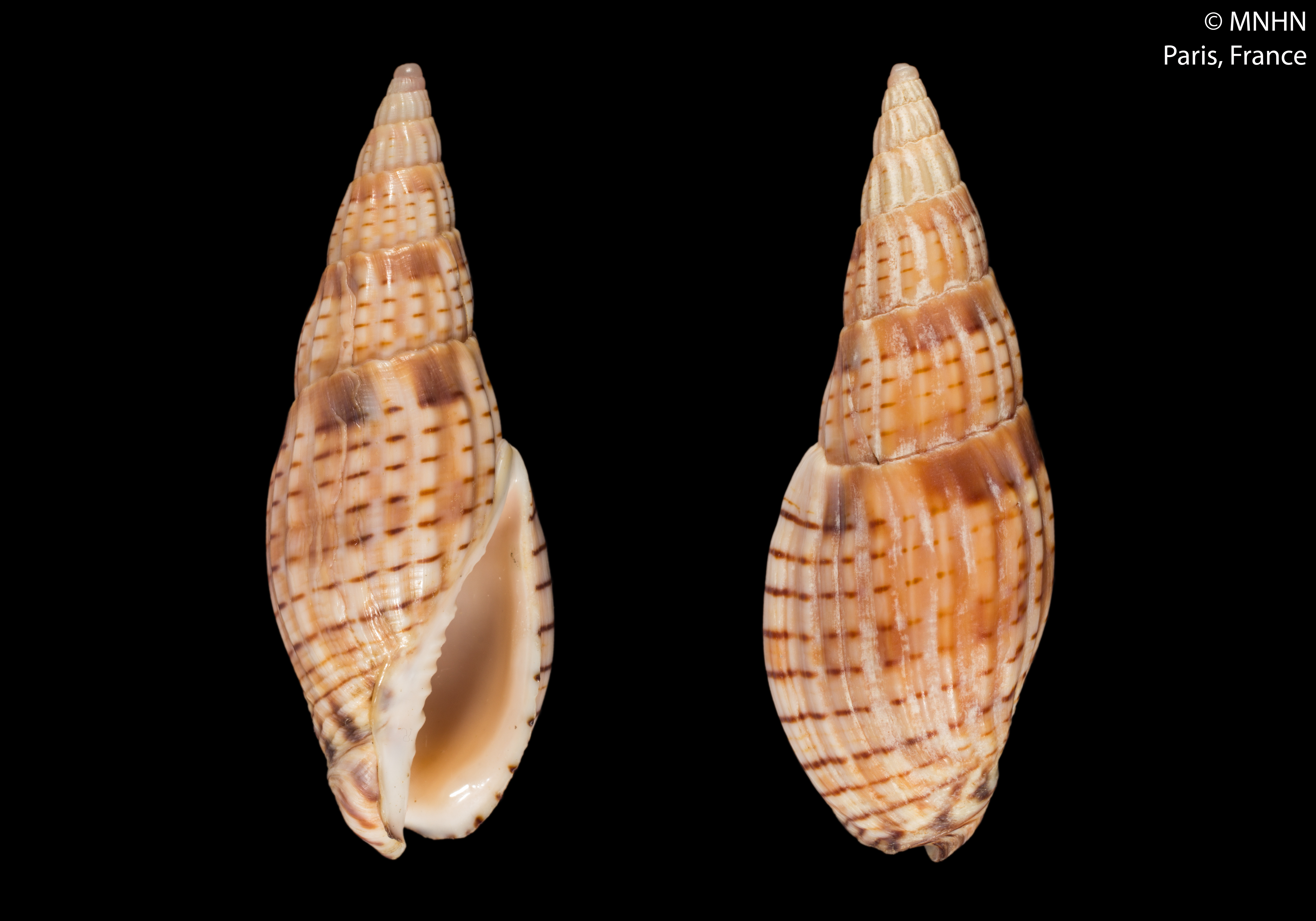
Image of the object that serves as the article focus

Lyria patbaili is a species of sea snail, a marine gastropod mollusk in the family Volutidae, the volutes.

Subspecies

- Lyria patbaili minifusca Bozzetti, 2014
- Lyria patbaili patbaili Bouchet, 1999

== Distribution ==
This marine species occurs off Madagascar.
