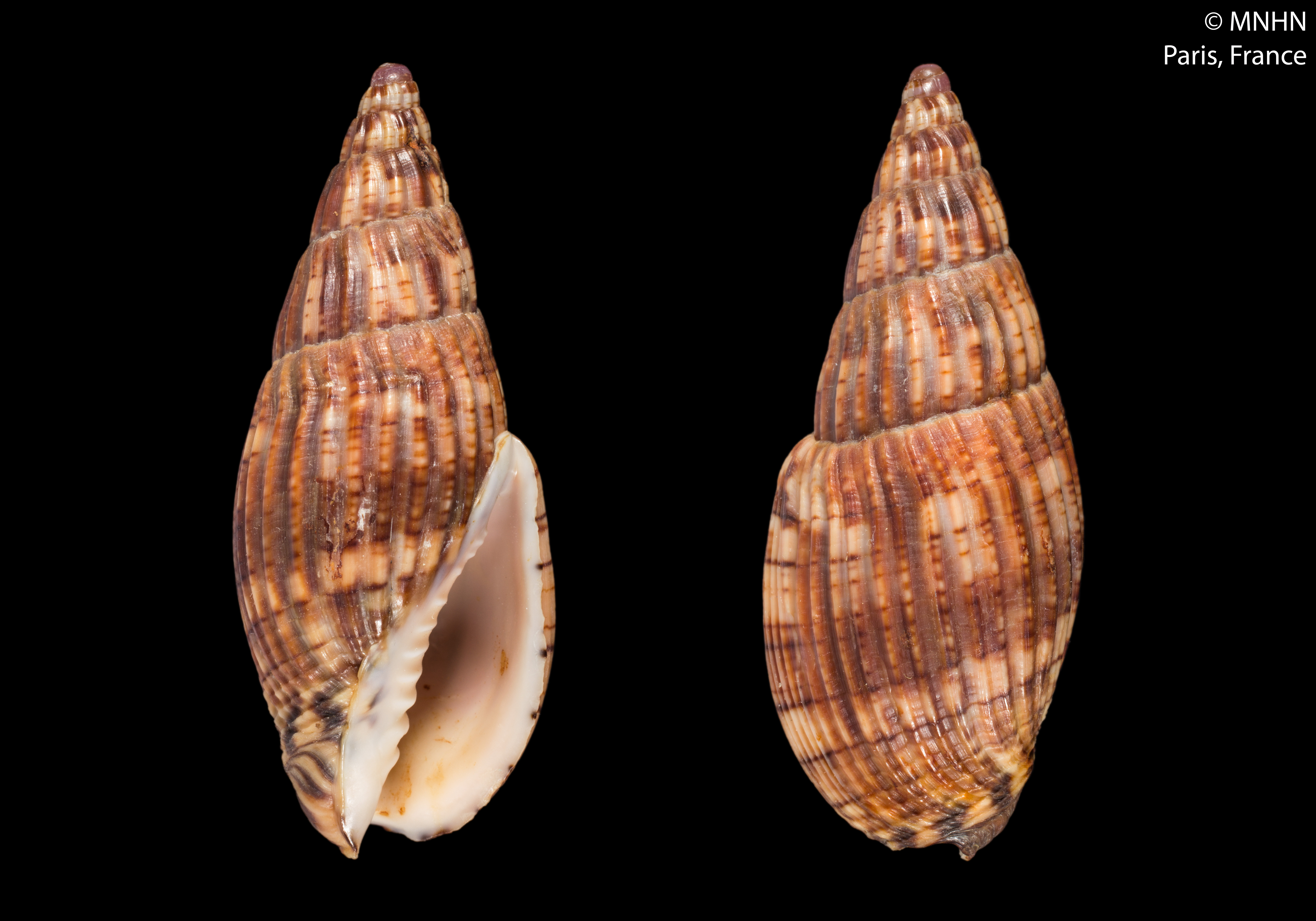
- Shell of Lyria solangeae (holotype at MNHN, Paris)

Scientific classification
- Kingdom: Animalia
- Phylum: Mollusca
- Class: Gastropoda
- Subclass: Caenogastropoda
- Order: Neogastropoda
- Family: Volutidae
- Genus: Lyria
- Species: L. solangeae

Binomial name
- Lyria solangeae Bozzetti, 2008

Synonyms
- Indolyria solangeae (Bozzetti, 2007); Lyria (Indolyria) solangeae Bozzetti, 2008· accepted, alternate representation

= Lyria solangeae =

Species of gastropod

Lyria solangeae is a species of sea snail, a marine gastropod mollusk in the family Volutidae, the volutes.

== Description ==
The length of the shell attains 53.85 mm.

== Distribution ==
This marine species occurs off Madagascar.
