= Lyria cordis =

Scientific classification
- Kingdom: Animalia
- Phylum: Mollusca
- Class: Gastropoda
- Subclass: Caenogastropoda
- Order: Neogastropoda
- Family: Volutidae
- Genus: Lyria
- Species: L. cordis

Binomial name
- Lyria cordis Bayer, 1971

Species of gastropod

Lyria cordis is a species of sea snail, a marine gastropod mollusk in the family Volutidae, the volutes.

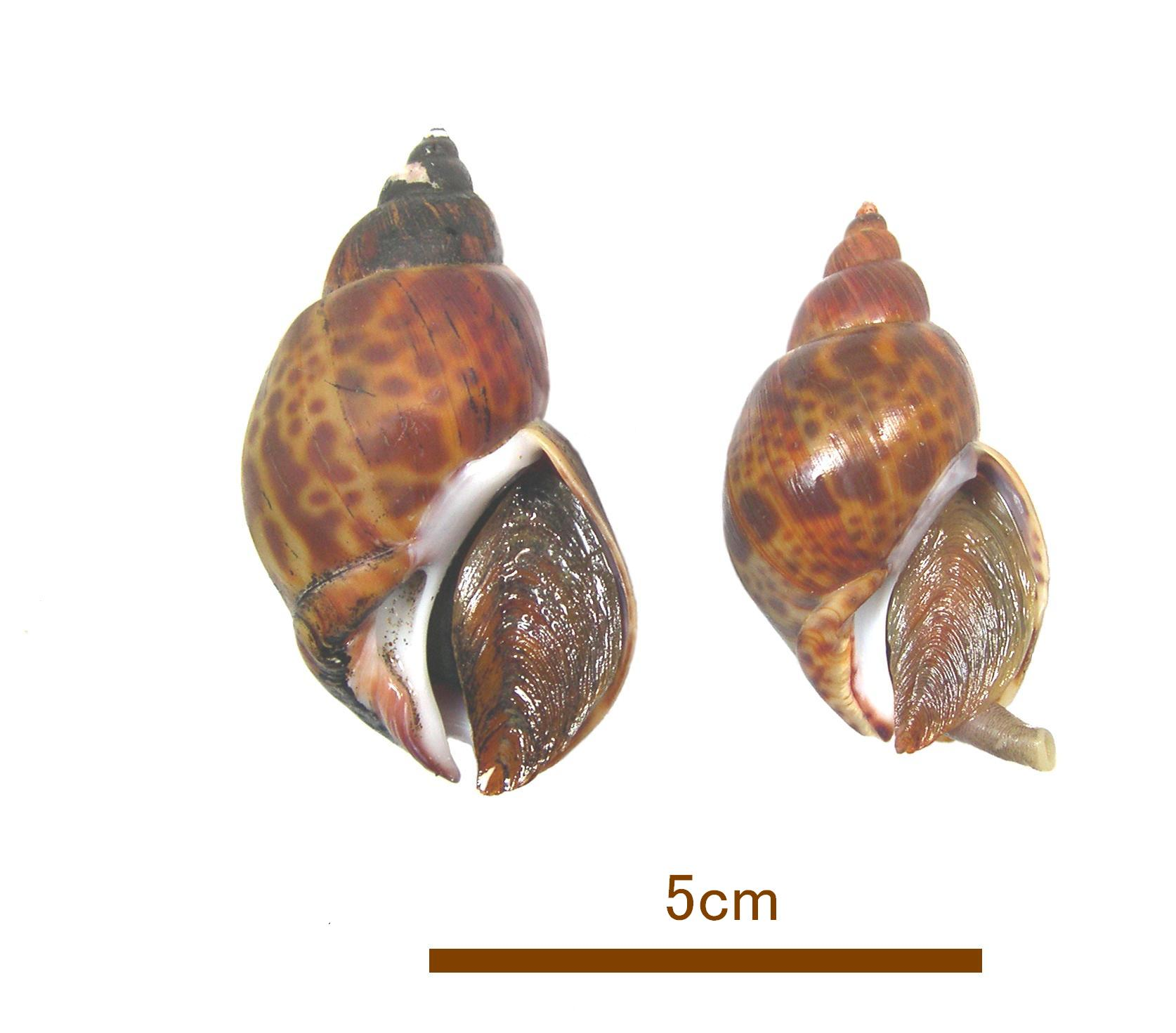
