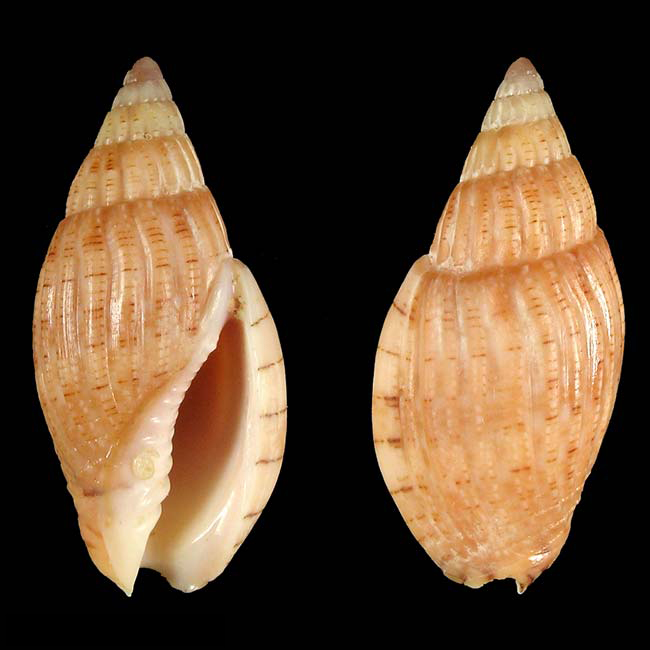

Scientific classification
- Kingdom: Animalia
- Phylum: Mollusca
- Class: Gastropoda
- Subclass: Caenogastropoda
- Order: Neogastropoda
- Family: Volutidae
- Genus: Lyria
- Species: L. brianoi

Binomial name
- Lyria brianoi Poppe, 1999

Synonyms
- Lyria (Indolyria) brianoi Poppe, 1999

= Lyria brianoi =

Species of gastropod

Lyria brianoi is a species of sea snail, a marine gastropod mollusk in the family Volutidae, the volutes.

== Distribution ==
This species occurs in the Indian Ocean off Madagascar.
