= Lyria leonardi =

Scientific classification
- Kingdom: Animalia
- Phylum: Mollusca
- Class: Gastropoda
- Subclass: Caenogastropoda
- Order: Neogastropoda
- Family: Volutidae
- Genus: Lyria
- Species: L. leonardi

Binomial name
- Lyria leonardi Emerson,1985

Species of gastropod

Lyria leonardi is a species of sea snail, a marine gastropod mollusk in the family Volutidae, the volutes.
