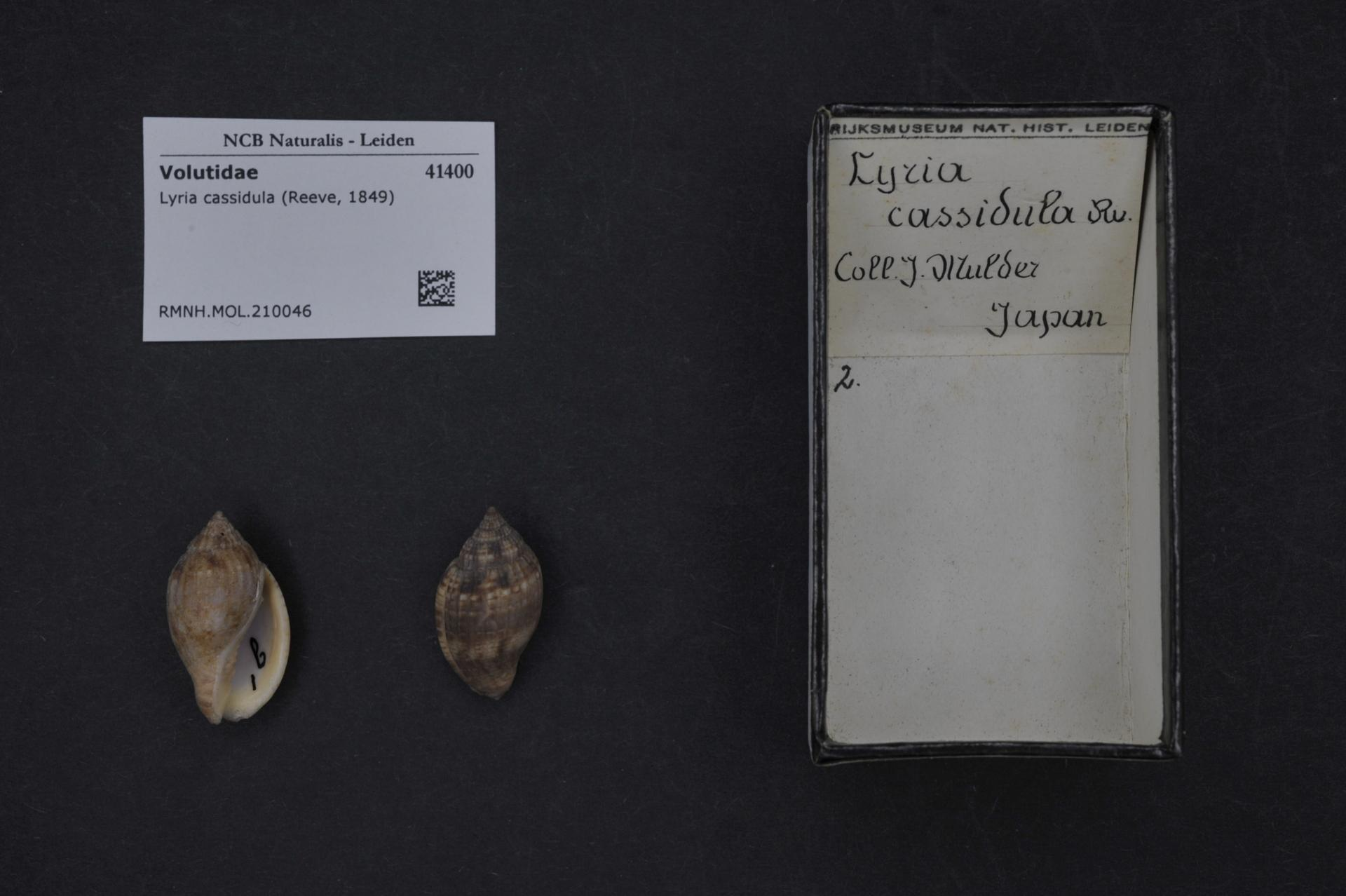
- Shell of Lyria cassidula (specimen at Naturalis, Leiden)

Scientific classification
- Kingdom: Animalia
- Phylum: Mollusca
- Class: Gastropoda
- Subclass: Caenogastropoda
- Order: Neogastropoda
- Family: Volutidae
- Genus: Lyria
- Species: L. cassidula

Binomial name
- Lyria cassidula (Reeve, 1849)

Synonyms
- Lyria (Lyria) cassidula (Reeve, 1849)· accepted, alternate representation; Voluta cassidula Reeve, 1849 (original combination)

= Lyria cassidula =

Species of gastropod

Lyria cassidula is a species of sea snail, a marine gastropod mollusk in the family Volutidae, the volutes.

Subspecies

- Lyria cassidula cassidula (Reeve, 1849)
- Lyria cassidula pallidula Habe, 1962
