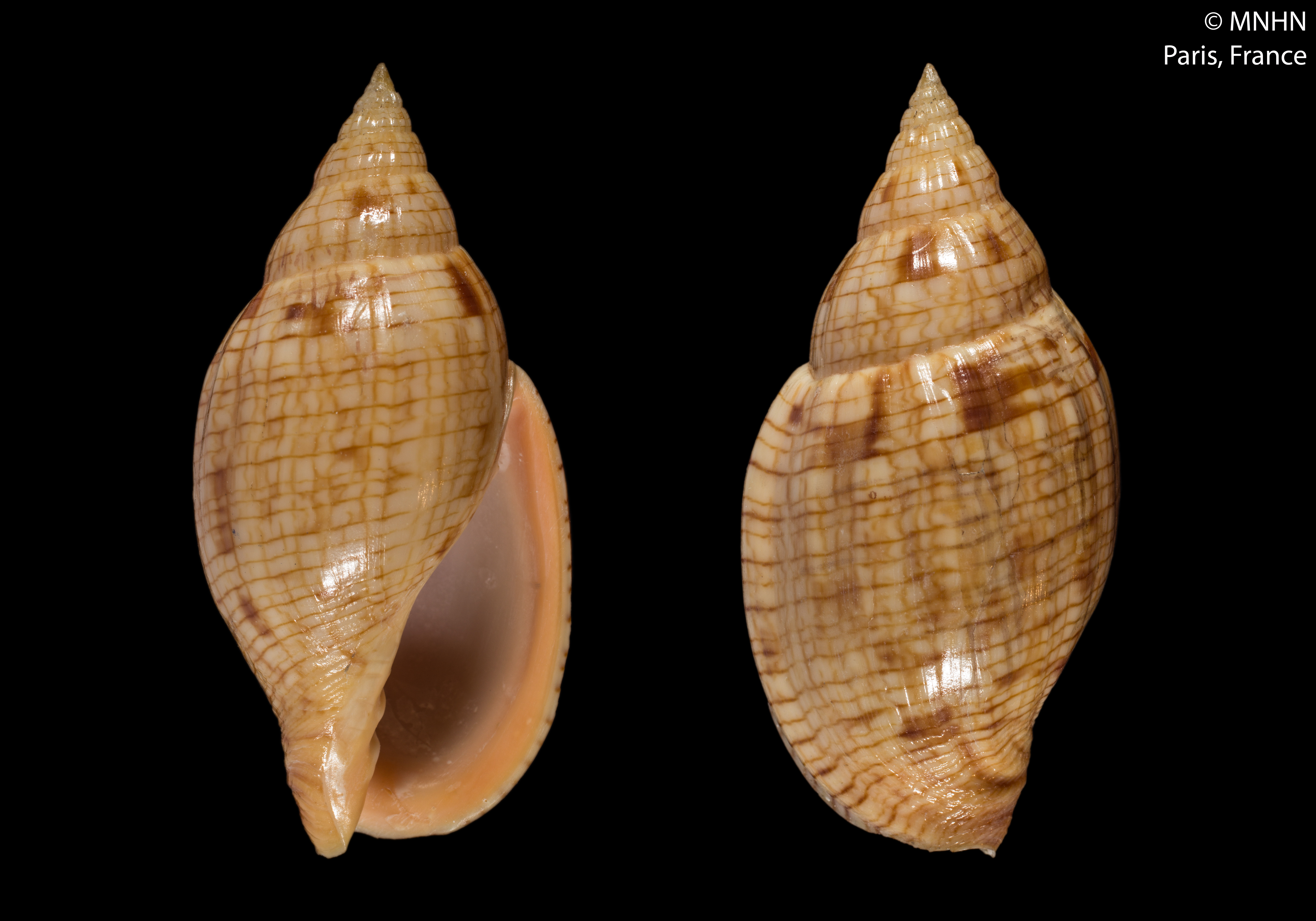
- Shell of Lyria mallicki jessicae (holotype at MNHN, Paris)

Scientific classification
- Kingdom: Animalia
- Phylum: Mollusca
- Class: Gastropoda
- Subclass: Caenogastropoda
- Order: Neogastropoda
- Family: Volutidae
- Genus: Lyria
- Species: L. mallicki

Binomial name
- Lyria mallicki Ladd, 1975

Synonyms
- Lyria (Lyria) habei Okutani,1979; Lyria (Lyria) mallicki Ladd, 1975· accepted, alternate representation; Lyria (Lyria) mallicki mallicki Ladd, 1975· accepted, alternate representation; Lyria dondani Angioy & Biraghi, 1982; Lyria habei Okutani, 1979; Lyria mallicki mallicki Ladd, 1975· accepted, alternate representation; Lyria reinai Angioy & Biraghi,1981; Lyria vicdani Kosuge,1981

= Lyria mallicki =

Species of gastropod

Lyria mallicki is a species of sea snail, a marine gastropod mollusk in the family Volutidae, the volutes. It can be found in the Philippines.

== Subspecies ==
- Lyria mallicki jessicae Bail & Poppe, 2004 (occurs off the Philippines)
