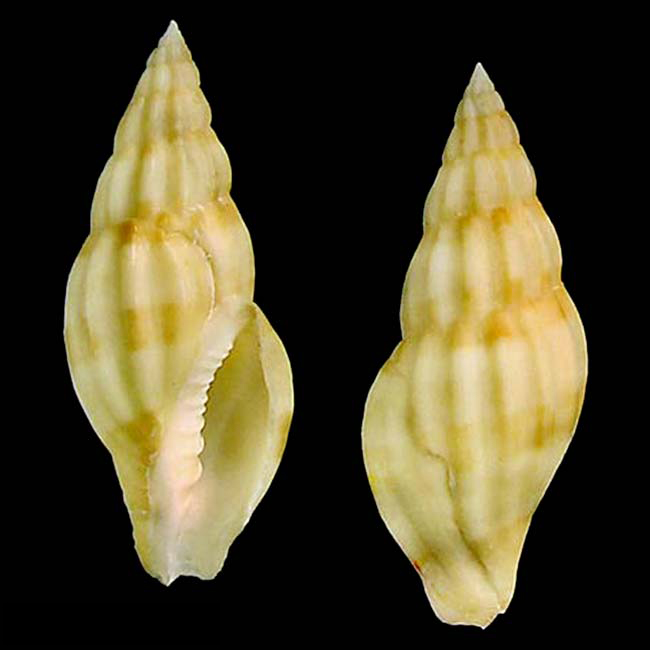

Scientific classification
- Kingdom: Animalia
- Phylum: Mollusca
- Class: Gastropoda
- Subclass: Caenogastropoda
- Order: Neogastropoda
- Family: Volutidae
- Genus: Lyria
- Species: L. boucheti

Binomial name
- Lyria boucheti Bail & Poppe, 2004

Synonyms
- Lyria (Plicolyria) boucheti Bail & Poppe, 2004 accepted, alternate representation

= Lyria boucheti =

Species of gastropod

Lyria boucheti is a species of sea snail, a marine gastropod mollusk in the family Volutidae, the volutes.

== Description ==
The length of the shell attains 73.4 mm.

== Distribution ==
This marine species occurs off the Fiji Islands.
