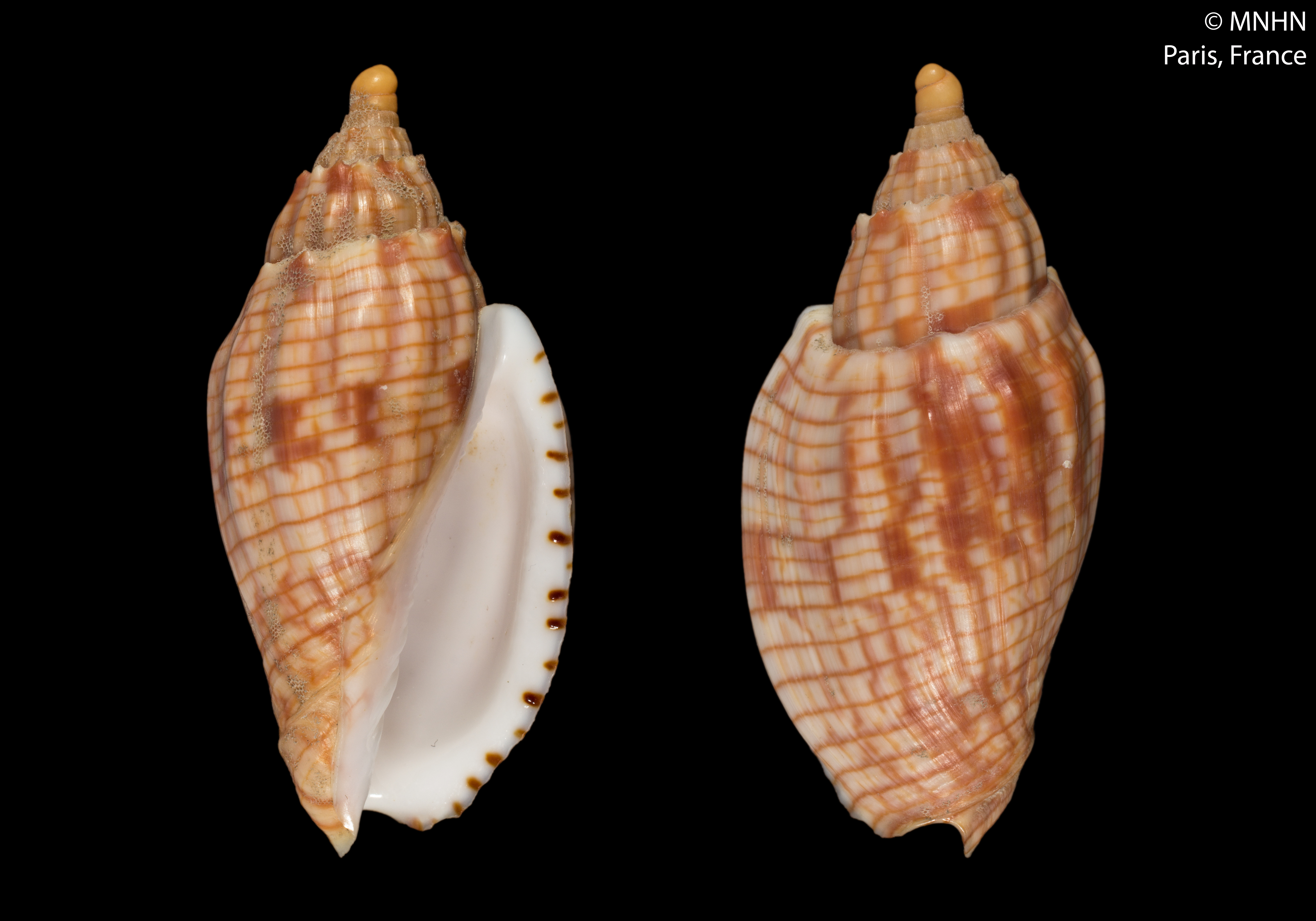

Scientific classification
- Kingdom: Animalia
- Phylum: Mollusca
- Class: Gastropoda
- Subclass: Caenogastropoda
- Order: Neogastropoda
- Family: Volutidae
- Genus: Lyria
- Species: L. cloveriana

Binomial name
- Lyria cloveriana Weaver,1963

Synonyms
- Lyria (Indolyria) cloveriana Weaver, 1963· accepted, alternate representation; Lyria (Indolyria) cloveriana cloveriana Weaver, 1963· accepted, alternate representation; Lyria cloveriana cloveriana Weaver, 1963· accepted, alternate representation

= Lyria cloveriana =

Species of gastropod

Lyria cloveriana is a species of sea snail, a marine gastropod mollusk in the family Volutidae, the volutes.

Subspecies

- Lyria cloveriana gabryae Poppe, 1991 (occurs off Sri Lanka)
