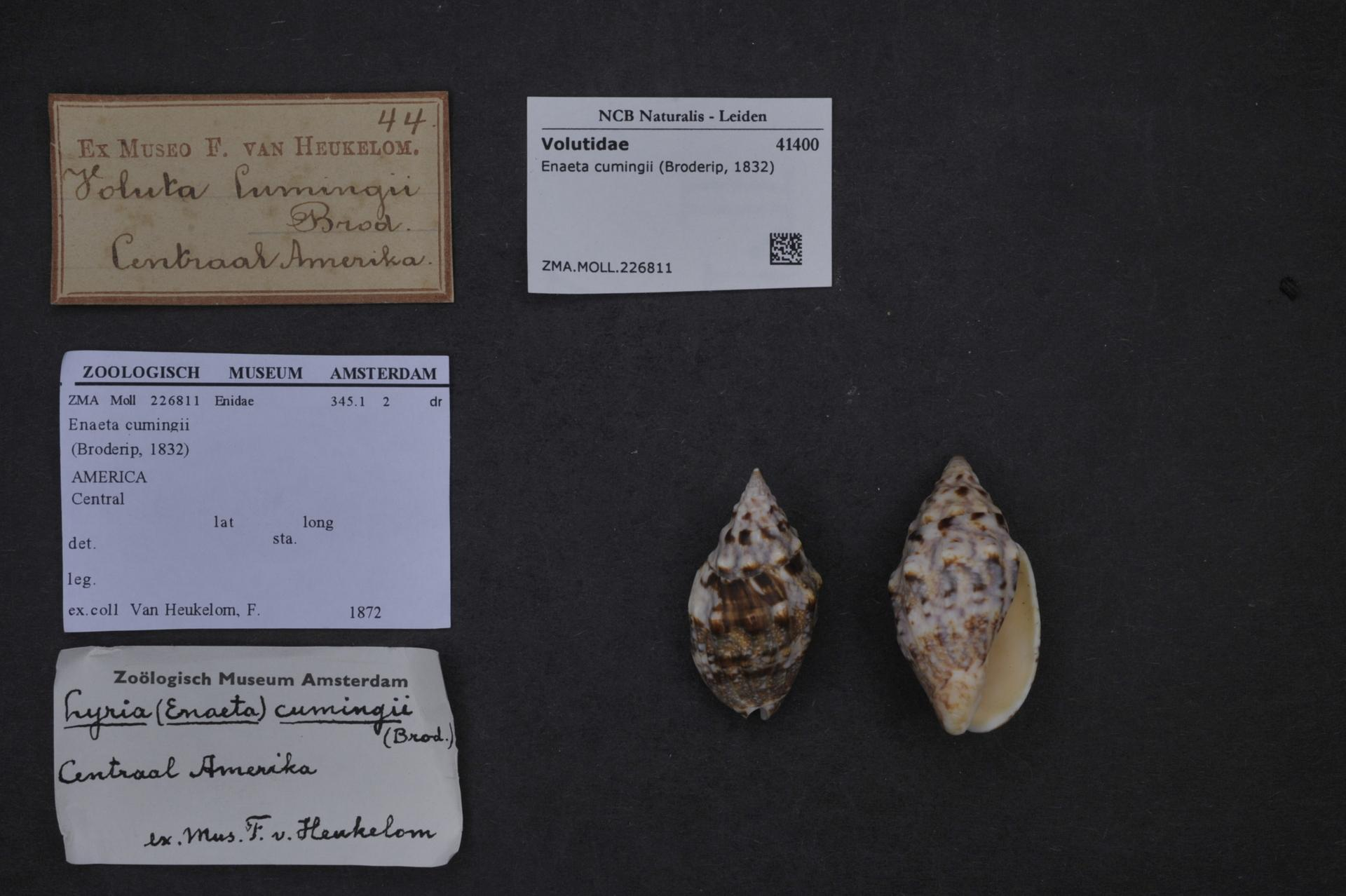
- Enaeta cumingii shells

Scientific classification
- Kingdom: Animalia
- Phylum: Mollusca
- Class: Gastropoda
- Subclass: Caenogastropoda
- Order: Neogastropoda
- Family: Volutidae
- Genus: Enaeta
- Species: E. cumingii

Binomial name
- Enaeta cumingii (Broderip, 1832)

Synonyms
- Lyria pedersenii Verrill, 1870

= Enaeta cumingii =

Species of gastropod

Enaeta cumingii is a species of sea snail, a marine gastropod mollusk in the family Volutidae, the volutes.
