= Enaeta leonardhilli =

Scientific classification
- Kingdom: Animalia
- Phylum: Mollusca
- Class: Gastropoda
- Subclass: Caenogastropoda
- Order: Neogastropoda
- Family: Volutidae
- Genus: Enaeta
- Species: E. leonardhilli

Binomial name
- Enaeta leonardhilli Petuch, 1982

Synonyms
- Lyria leonardhilli Petuch, 1988 (original combination)

Species of gastropod

Enaeta leonardhilli is a species of sea snail, a marine gastropod mollusk in the family Volutidae, the volutes.

== Description ==
A small species, attaining no more than about 15-20 mm in size.

== Distribution ==
This species occurs in the Atlantic Ocean off Brazil and the Fernando de Noronha Islands.
