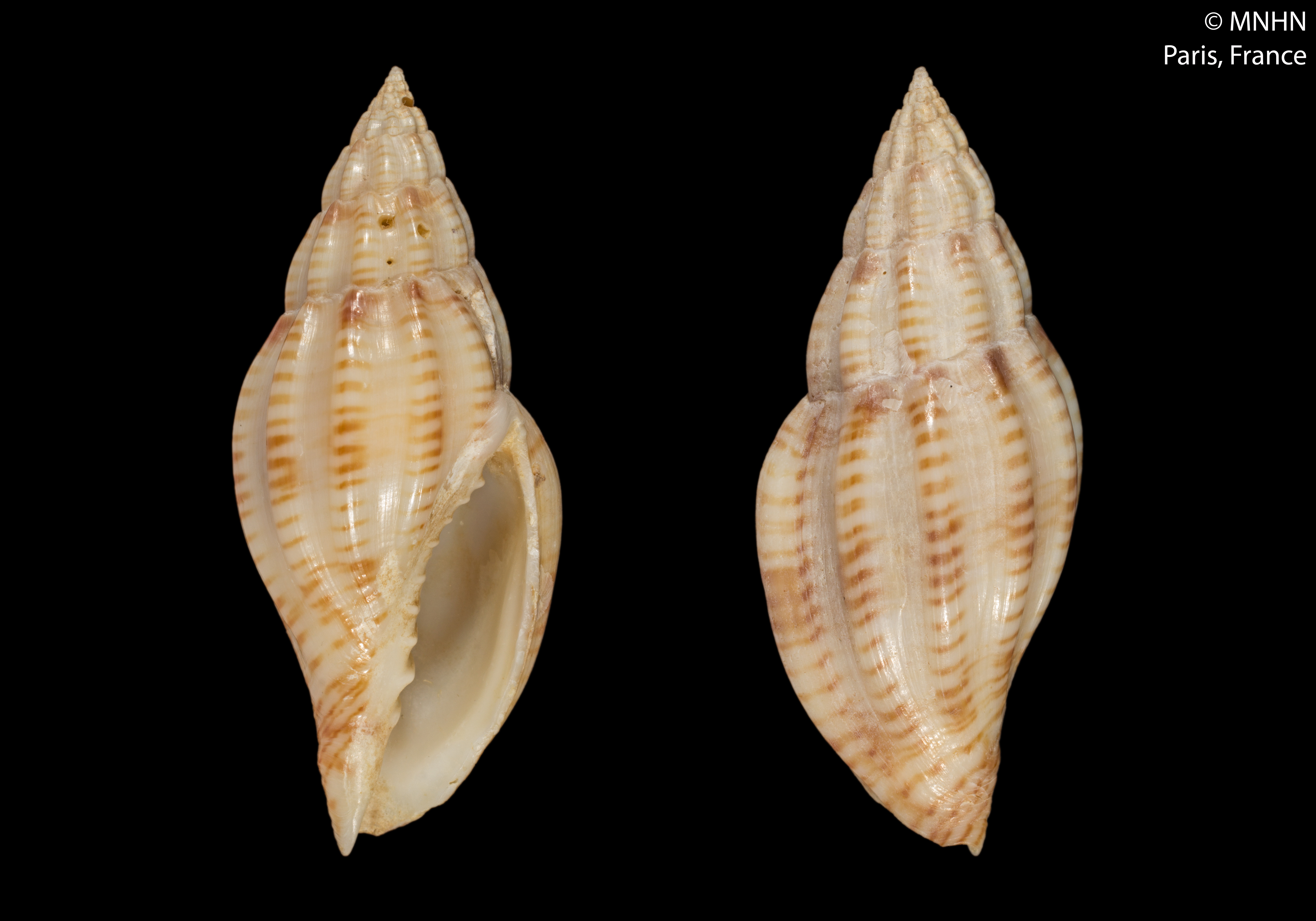
- Shell of Lyria planicostata fijiensis (holotype at MNHN, Paris)

Scientific classification
- Kingdom: Animalia
- Phylum: Mollusca
- Class: Gastropoda
- Subclass: Caenogastropoda
- Order: Neogastropoda
- Family: Volutidae
- Genus: Lyria
- Species: L. planicostata

Binomial name
- Lyria planicostata (Sowerby III, 1903)

Synonyms
- Lyria (Plicolyria) planicostata (G. B. Sowerby III, 1903)· accepted, alternate representation; Lyria (Plicolyria) planicostata planicostata (G. B. Sowerby III, 1903)· accepted, alternate representation; Lyria davaoensis Kosuge, 1980; Lyria kawamurai Habe, 1975; Lyria planicostata planicostata (G. B. Sowerby III, 1903)· accepted, alternate representation; Lyria santoensis Ladd, 1975; Lyria taiwanica Lan, 1975; Lyria taiwanica f. davaoensis Kosuge, 1980 (unavailable name: established as "forma" after 1960); Voluta planicostata G. B. Sowerby III, 1903

= Lyria planicostata =

Species of gastropod

Lyria planicostata is a species of sea snail, a marine gastropod mollusk in the family Volutidae, the volutes.

Subspecies

- Lyria planicostata fijiensis Bail & Poppe, 2004 (length: 51.5 mm; occurs off the Fiji Islands)
- Lyria planicostata grohi Bail & Poppe, 2004 (occurs off Tonga)

== Description ==
Adult shells attain a size of 75-90 mm.

== Distribution ==
Pacific Ocean: Philippines area.
