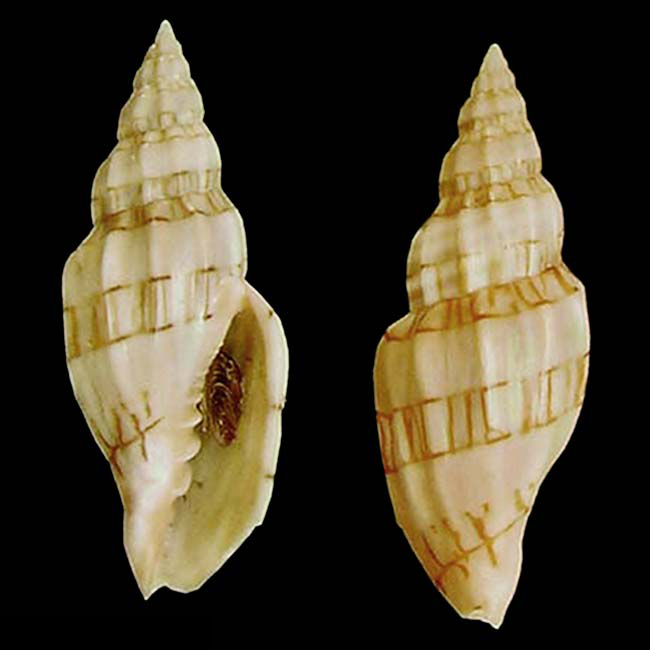

Scientific classification
- Kingdom: Animalia
- Phylum: Mollusca
- Class: Gastropoda
- Subclass: Caenogastropoda
- Order: Neogastropoda
- Family: Volutidae
- Genus: Lyria
- Species: L. exorata

Binomial name
- Lyria exorata Bouchet & Poppe, 1988

Synonyms
- Lyria (Plicolyria) exorata Bouchet & Poppe, 1988· accepted, alternate representation

= Lyria exorata =

Species of gastropod

Lyria exorata is a species of sea snail, a marine gastropod mollusk in the family Volutidae.

== Description ==
The length of the shell attains 90 mm with a coil like structure.

== Distribution ==
The species was found in the New Caledonian region on the Lord Howe Rise in the Coral Sea.
