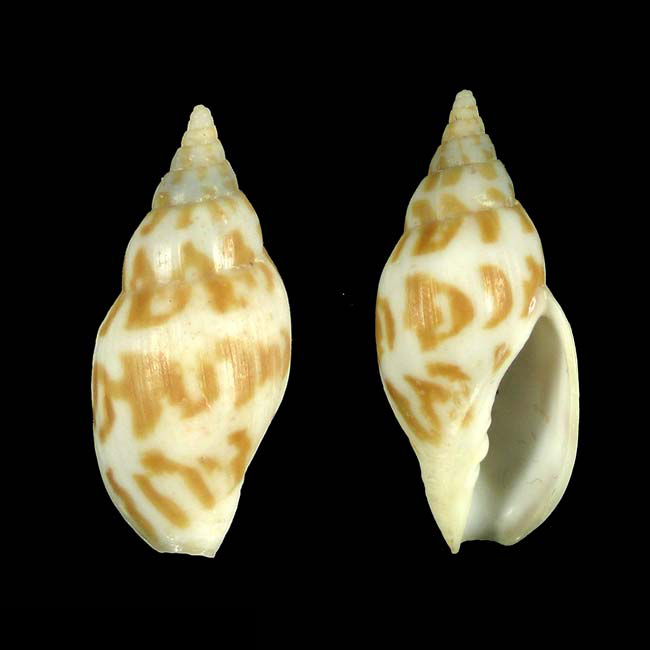

Scientific classification
- Kingdom: Animalia
- Phylum: Mollusca
- Class: Gastropoda
- Subclass: Caenogastropoda
- Order: Neogastropoda
- Family: Volutidae
- Genus: Lyria
- Species: L. guionneti

Binomial name
- Lyria guionneti Poppe & Conde, 2001

Synonyms
- Lyria (Plicolyria) guionneti Poppe & Conde, 2001· accepted, alternate representation

= Lyria guionneti =

Species of gastropod

Lyria guionneti is a species of sea snail, a marine gastropod mollusk in the family Volutidae, the volutes.

== Distribution ==
This marine species occurs off New Caledonia.
