= Lyria leslieboschae =

Scientific classification
- Kingdom: Animalia
- Phylum: Mollusca
- Class: Gastropoda
- Subclass: Caenogastropoda
- Order: Neogastropoda
- Family: Volutidae
- Genus: Lyria
- Species: L. leslieboschae

Binomial name
- Lyria leslieboschae Emerson & Sage,1986

Species of gastropod

Lyria leslieboschae is a species of sea snail, a marine gastropod mollusk in the family Volutidae, the volutes.
