= Enaeta barnesii =

Scientific classification
- Kingdom: Animalia
- Phylum: Mollusca
- Class: Gastropoda
- Subclass: Caenogastropoda
- Order: Neogastropoda
- Family: Volutidae
- Genus: Enaeta
- Species: E. barnesii

Binomial name
- Enaeta barnesii (Gray, 1825)

Synonyms
- Lyria harpa Barnes, 1824

Species of gastropod

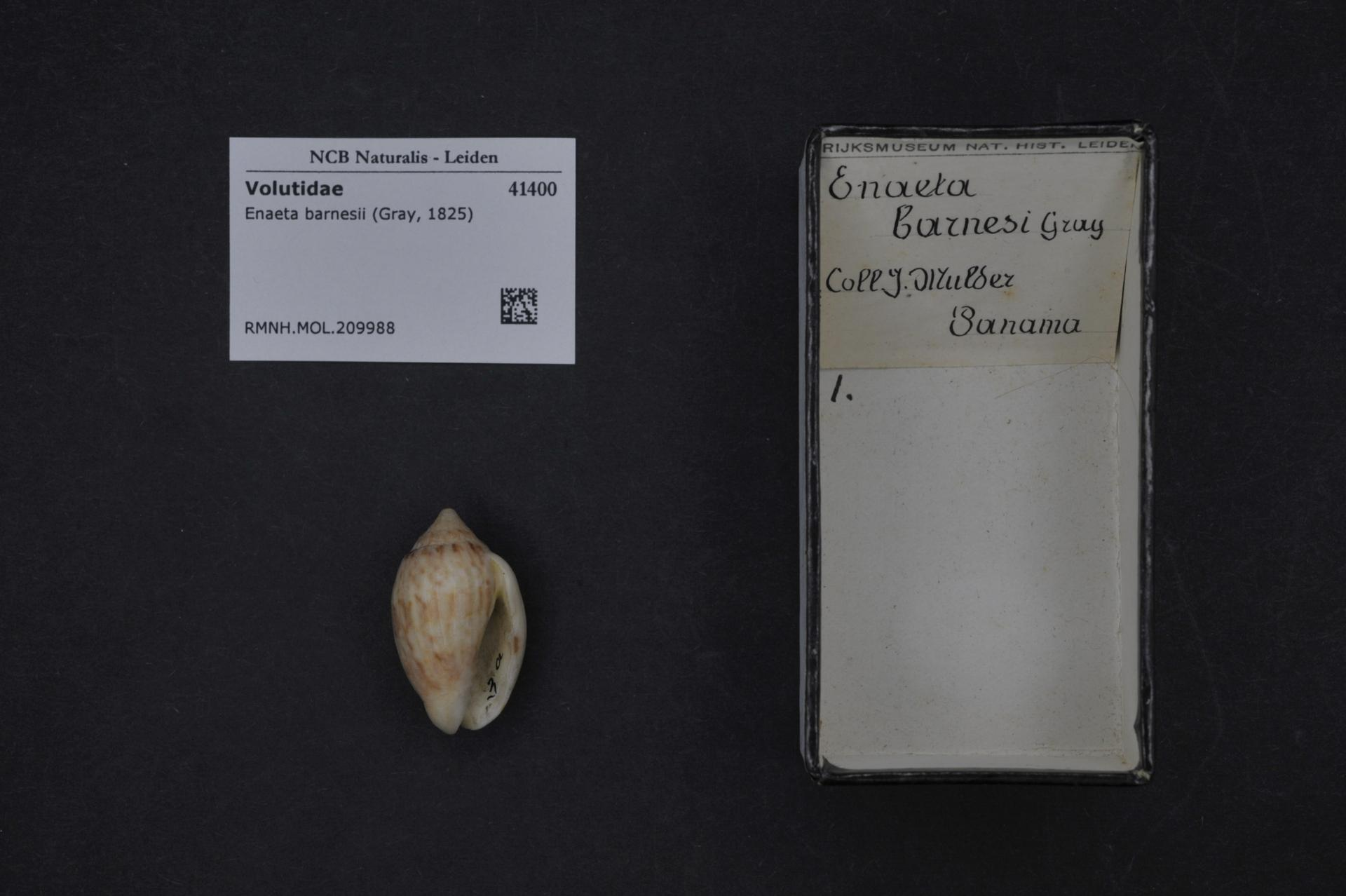
Enaeta barnesii

Enaeta barnesii is a species of sea snail, a marine gastropod mollusk in the family Volutidae, the volutes.
