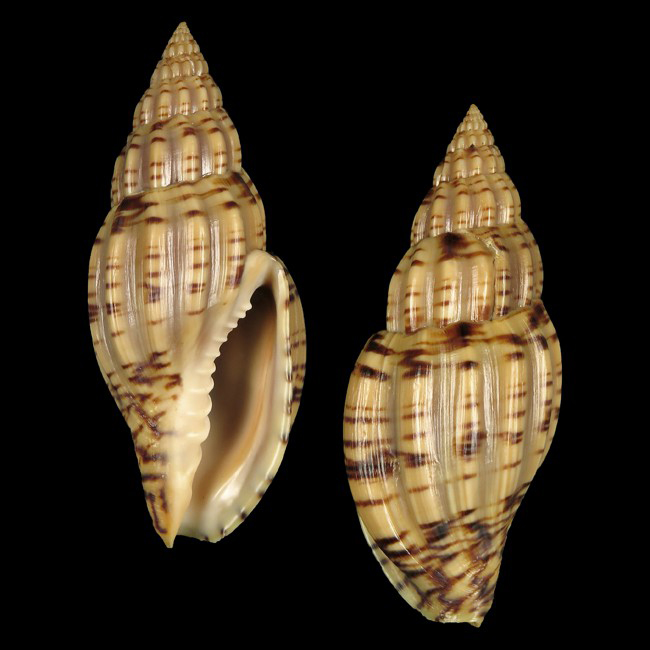

Scientific classification
- Kingdom: Animalia
- Phylum: Mollusca
- Class: Gastropoda
- Subclass: Caenogastropoda
- Order: Neogastropoda
- Family: Volutidae
- Genus: Lyria
- Species: L. boholensis

Binomial name
- Lyria boholensis Poppe, 1987

= Lyria boholensis =

Species of gastropod

Lyria boholensis is a species of sea snail, a marine gastropod mollusk in the family Volutidae, the volutes.

== Original Description ==
- (of Lyria taiwanica f. boholensis Kosuge, 1980) Kosuge S. (1980) Studies on the collection of Mr. Victor Dan (3) Note on the local variations of Lyria taiwanica Lan, 1975 (Gastropoda Volutacea). Bulletin of the Institute of Malacology, Tokyo 1(4): 65–66, pl. 17. [31 July 1980] page(s): 66, pl. 17 figs 9–12.
