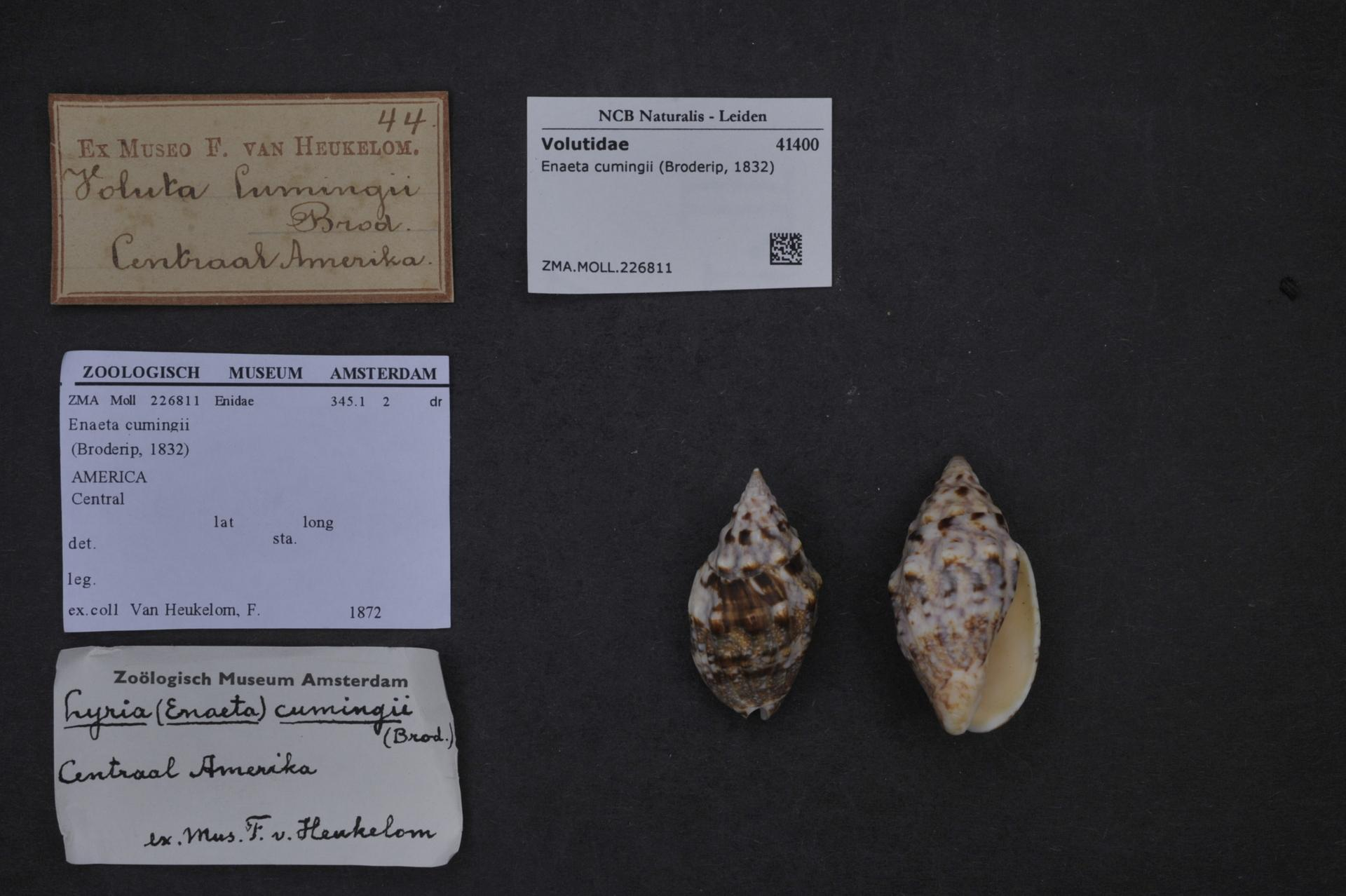
- Enaeta

Scientific classification
- Kingdom: Animalia
- Phylum: Mollusca
- Class: Gastropoda
- Subclass: Caenogastropoda
- Order: Neogastropoda
- Family: Volutidae
- Subfamily: Volutinae
- Genus: Enaeta; H. Adams & A. Adams, 1853

Synonyms
- Lyria (Enaeta) H. Adams & A. Adams, 1853

= Enaeta =

Genus of gastropods

Enaeta is a genus of sea snails, marine gastropod mollusks in the family Volutidae.

== Description ==
The small shell has an ovate to fusiform shape. The protoconch is small and smooth. The teleoconch is covered with axial ribs. There is a conspicuous tooth-like blunt nodule on the midpoint of the outer lip. The radula is uniserial with an interlocking central cusp.

== Distribution ==
This species occurs from the Caribbean Sea to the Atlantic Ocean south to Brazil and Fernando de Noronha Islands.

== Species ==
Species within the genus Enaeta include:

- Enaeta barnesii (Gray, 1825)
- Enaeta cumingii (Broderip, 1832)
- Enaeta cylleniformis (Sowerby I, 1844)
- Enaeta guildingii (Sowerby I, 1844)
- Enaeta leonardhilli Petuch, 1982
- Enaeta reevei (Dall, 1907)
