= Enaeta reevei =

Scientific classification
- Kingdom: Animalia
- Phylum: Mollusca
- Class: Gastropoda
- Subclass: Caenogastropoda
- Order: Neogastropoda
- Family: Volutidae
- Genus: Enaeta
- Species: E. reevei

Binomial name
- Enaeta reevei (Dall, 1907)

Synonyms
- Lyria guttata Reeve, 1849

Species of gastropod

Enaeta reevei is a species of sea snail, a marine gastropod mollusk in the family Volutidae, the volutes.
