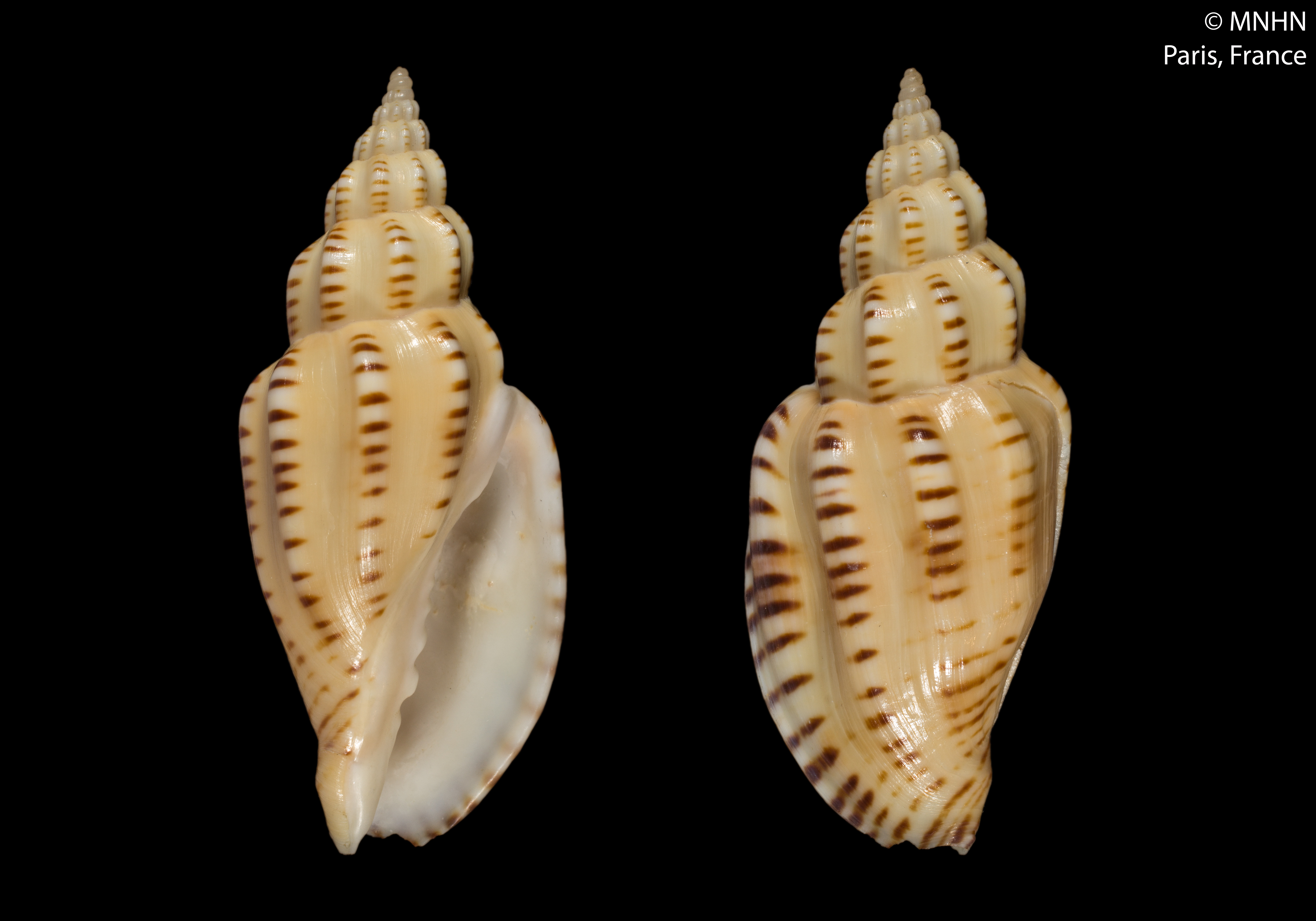

Scientific classification
- Kingdom: Animalia
- Phylum: Mollusca
- Class: Gastropoda
- Subclass: Caenogastropoda
- Order: Neogastropoda
- Family: Volutidae
- Genus: Lyria
- Species: L. kuniene

Binomial name
- Lyria kuniene Bouchet, 1979

Synonyms
- Lyria (Plicolyria) kuniene Bouchet, 1979· accepted, alternate representation

= Lyria kuniene =

Species of gastropod

Lyria kuniene is a species of sea snail, a marine gastropod mollusk in the family Volutidae, the volutes.

== Distribution ==
This marine species occurs off New Caledonia.
