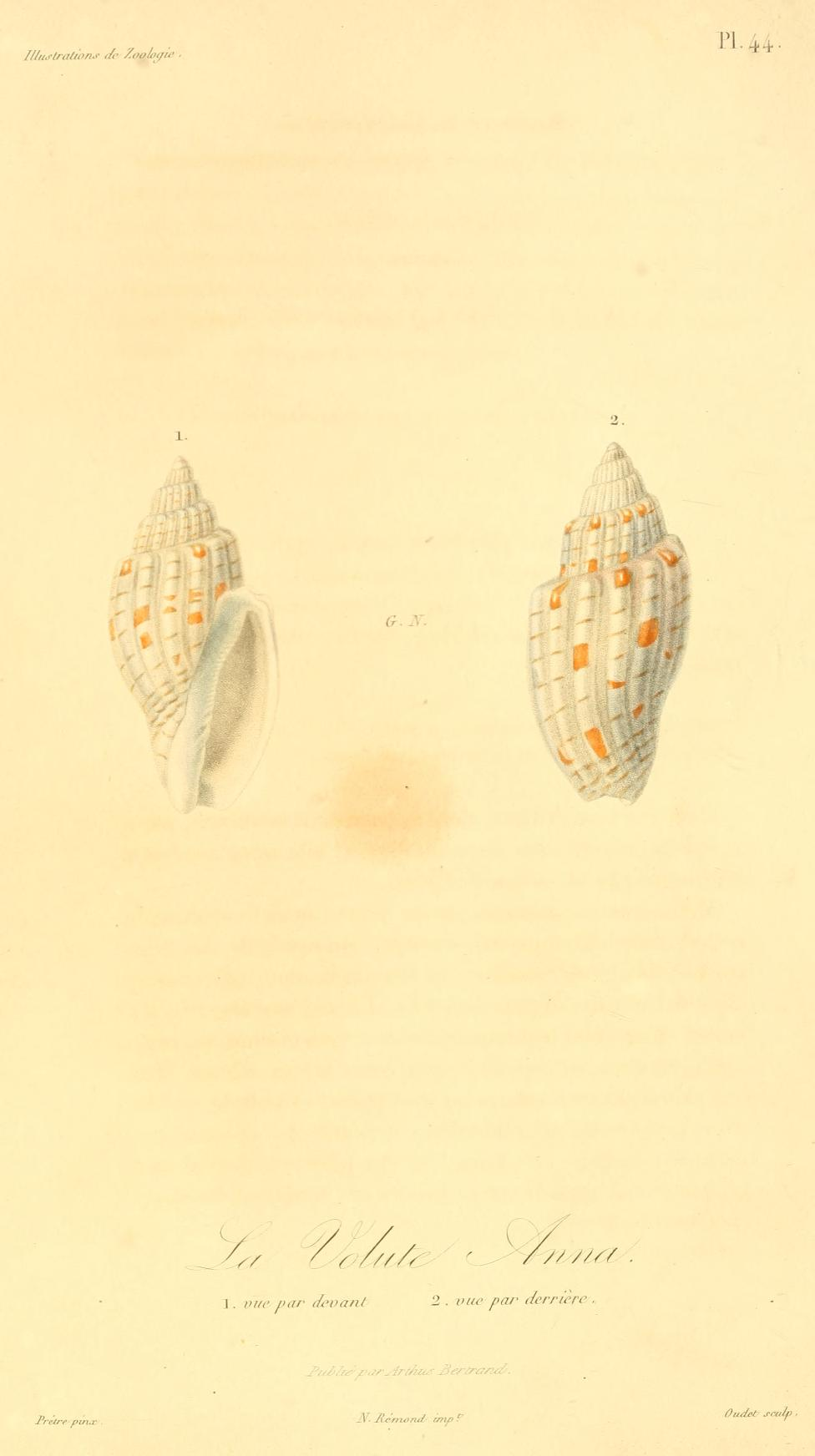
- Lyria anna shells

Scientific classification
- Kingdom: Animalia
- Phylum: Mollusca
- Class: Gastropoda
- Subclass: Caenogastropoda
- Order: Neogastropoda
- Family: Volutidae
- Genus: Lyria
- Species: L. anna

Binomial name
- Lyria anna (Lesson, 1835)

Synonyms
- Harpulina harpa (Swainson,1835); Voluta costata Swainson,1824; Voluta lyrata Sowerby,1825

= Lyria anna =

Species of gastropod

Lyria anna is a species of sea snail, a marine gastropod mollusk in the family Volutidae, the volutes.

== Distribution ==
Mauritius Island & Saint-Brandon Island, West Indian Ocean.
