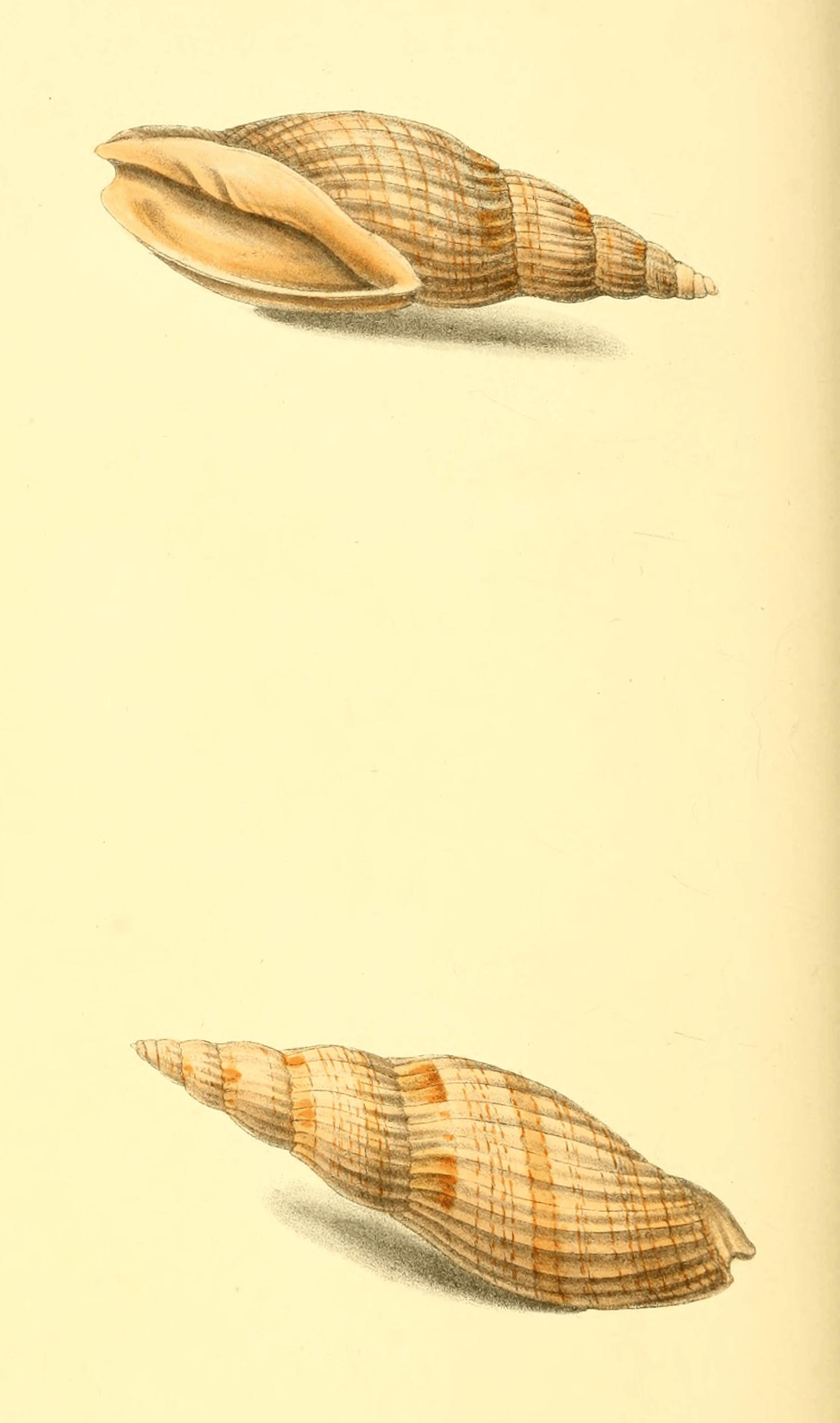

Scientific classification
- Kingdom: Animalia
- Phylum: Mollusca
- Class: Gastropoda
- Subclass: Caenogastropoda
- Order: Neogastropoda
- Family: Volutidae
- Genus: Lyria
- Species: L. lyraeformis

Binomial name
- Lyria lyraeformis (Swainson,1821)

= Lyria lyraeformis =

Species of gastropod

Lyria lyraeformis is a species of sea snail, a marine gastropod mollusk in the family Volutidae, the volute snails.

== Description ==
Fully adult shells can attain a size of 140 mm.

== Distribution ==
Somalia area of East Africa.
