= Patrice Bail =

== See also ==
- Category:Taxa named by Patrice Bail
