= Cymbiola oblita =

Scientific classification
- Kingdom: Animalia
- Phylum: Mollusca
- Class: Gastropoda
- Subclass: Caenogastropoda
- Order: Neogastropoda
- Family: Volutidae
- Genus: Cymbiola
- Species: C. oblita

Binomial name
- Cymbiola oblita (E. A. Smith, 1909)

Synonyms
- Cymbiola (Cymbiola) nivosa oblita (E. A. Smith, 1909); Cymbiola nivosa oblita (E. A. Smith, 1909) superseded rank; Voluta oblita E. A. Smith, 1909 superseded combination

Species of gastropod

Cymbiola oblita is a species of sea snail, a marine gastropod mollusk in the family Volutidae, the volutes.

== Description ==
(Original description) Although closely related to Cymbiola nivosa (Lamarck, 1804), this species can be distinguished by its overall coloration, its generally shorter form, and the more pronounced, spiny coronation on its whorls. Additionally, the lines on its transverse bands are much less distinct and typically less wavy. Unlike C. nivosa, the spaces between these banded zones feature a mottled pattern of brown or olive markings.

If we were to classify this shell merely as a variety of C. nivosa, consistency would require us to also group it with Cymbiola sophia (Gray, 1846). Aside from its rows of black spots and white columellar folds, C sophia lacks any distinguishing features from the present species. Nevertheless, based on the series of specimens examined, these three forms are almost always easily distinguishable and occupy distinct geographical ranges. It is worth noting, however, that a short, coronated variety of C. nivosa closely resembles certain forms of C. oblita.

== Distribution ==
This marine species is endemic to Australia and occurs off Western Australia.
