= Cymbiola pulchra excelsior =

Scientific classification
- Kingdom: Animalia
- Phylum: Mollusca
- Class: Gastropoda
- Subclass: Caenogastropoda
- Order: Neogastropoda
- Family: Volutidae
- Genus: Cymbiola
- Species: C. pulchra
- Subspecies: C. p. excelsior

Trinomial name
- Cymbiola pulchra excelsior Bail & Limpus, 1998

Synonyms
- Cymbiola (Cymbiolacca) excelsior Bail & Limpus, 1998; Cymbiola (Cymbiolacca) pulchra excelsior Bail & Limpus, 1998· accepted, alternate representation; Cymbiola excelsior Bail & Limpus, 1998 (original rank)

Subpecies of gastropod

Cymbiola pulchra excelsior is a subspecies of sea snail, a marine gastropod mollusc in the family Volutidae, the volutes.
