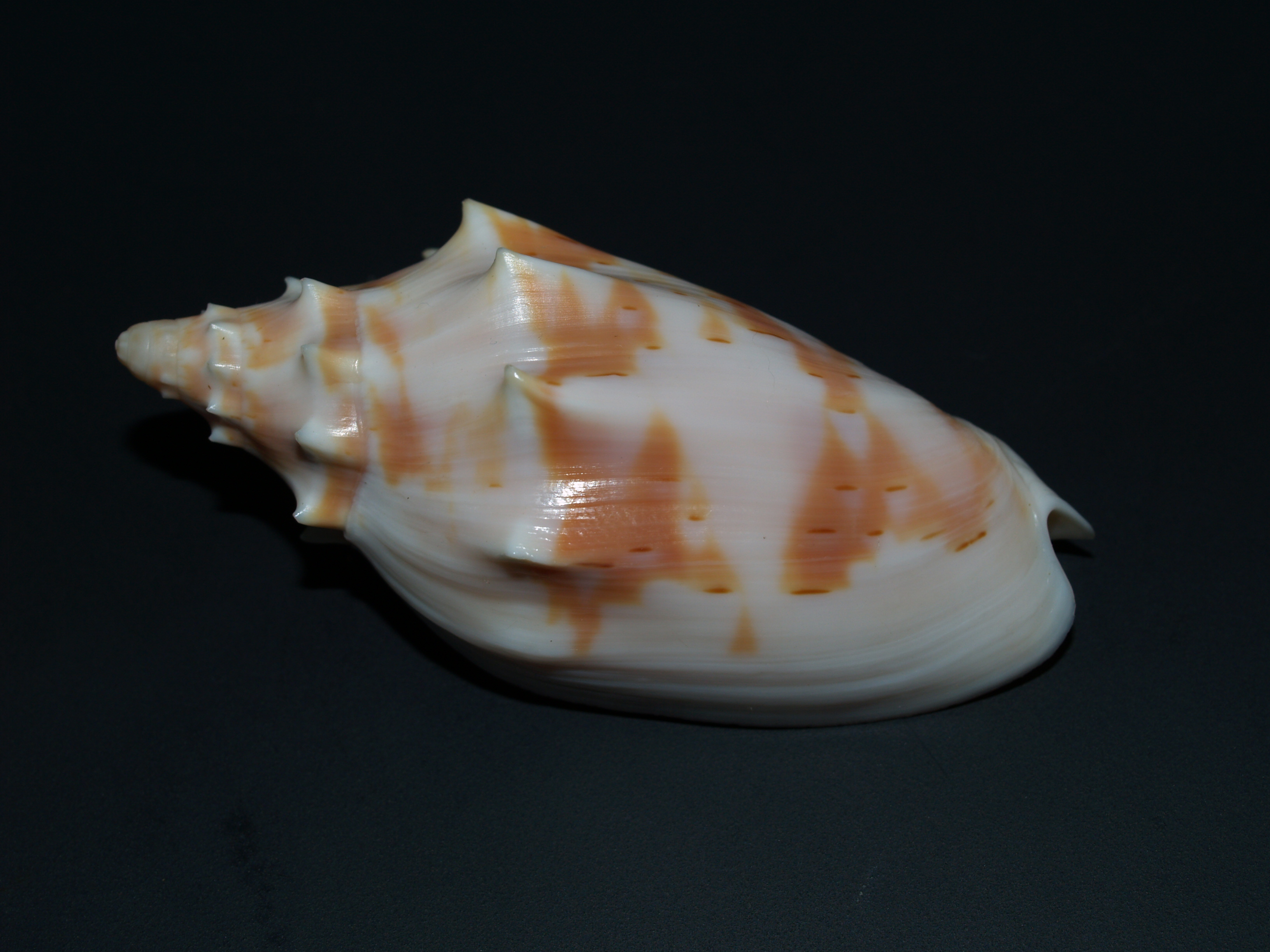

Scientific classification
- Kingdom: Animalia
- Phylum: Mollusca
- Class: Gastropoda
- Subclass: Caenogastropoda
- Order: Neogastropoda
- Family: Volutidae
- Genus: Cymbiola
- Species: C. pulchra
- Subspecies: C. p. wisemani

Trinomial name
- Cymbiola pulchra wisemani (Brazier, 1870)

Synonyms
- Cymbiola (Cymbiolacca) pulchra wisemani (Brazier, 1870) alternative representation; Cymbiola randalli Stokes, 1961 junior subjective synonym; Voluta wisemani Brazier, 1870 superseded combination

= Cymbiola pulchra wisemani =

Subspecies of mollusc

Cymbiola pulchra wisemani is a subspecies of large sea snail, a marine gastropod mollusc in the family volutidae, the volutes.

This subspecies is closely related to, and may be conspecific with, Cymbiola pulchra peristicta from the Swain Reefs region at the southern end of the Great Barrier Reef.

The shell shape and colour pattern vary from population to population, with many endemic colour forms known.

== Distribution ==
This species occurs in shallow water on top of the Great Barrier Reef, Queensland, Australia from at least as far north as Saint Crispins Reef Reef east of Cape Tribulation to at least as far south as Stanley Reef north east of Bowen.

== Description ==
(Original description) The first three whorls, which form the apex, are minutely granular in texture. On the fourth whorl, the tubercles become slightly raised, straight, and very sharply pointed, and orange-coloured blotches appear along the suture. On the fifth whorl, the tubercles are more prominently raised and sharply pointed, each tipped with orange, while fine orange blotches mark the suture and the spaces between the tubercles remain white.

On the body whorl, five prominent, sharp-pointed tubercles project at the angle, each tipped with orange. The areas between them are white, and below this runs an irregular, interrupted orange band composed of blotches, again separated by white spaces. Toward the base, eight irregular, large orange blotches extend from the edge of the lip to the columella, with the intermediate spaces forming trigonal white shapes. Minute round and oblong brown dots are scattered irregularly over the entire shell, at first glance giving the impression that the pattern has been applied artificially.

The columella bears four plaits: the first three are conspicuous, while the lower plait is scarcely visible and does not extend across the columella as in Cymbiola pulchra, but instead runs more obliquely. The base is covered with flesh-coloured enamel that is strongly puckered. The edge of the lip is tinged with bright orange, and the interior of the aperture is flesh-coloured. The red longitudinal lines that are so characteristic at the sutures in C. pulchra and Cymbiola complexa are absent in this species. Although the differences between C. pulchra and C. pulchra wisemani are subtle, they are nevertheless uniform and consistent.
