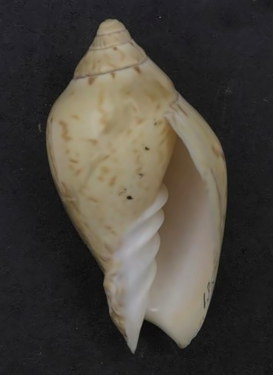
- Apertural view of a shell of Cymbiola flavicans (museum specimen at Naturalis Biodiversity Center)

Scientific classification
- Kingdom: Animalia
- Phylum: Mollusca
- Class: Gastropoda
- Subclass: Caenogastropoda
- Order: Neogastropoda
- Family: Volutidae
- Genus: Cymbiola
- Species: C. flavicans

Binomial name
- Cymbiola flavicans (Gmelin, 1791)

Synonyms
- Aulica kellneri Iredale, 1957; Aulica quaesita Iredale, 1956; Cymbiola (Cymbiola) flavicans (Gmelin, 1791) · accepted, alternate representation; Cymbiola flavicans spinosa J. K. Allan, 1950; Voluta (Cymbiola) kirki F. W. Hutton, 1873 (mislocalised specimen of Australian origin); Voluta flavicans Gmelin, 1791; Voluta lugubris Swainson, 1823; Voluta modesta Wood, 1828; Voluta signifer Broderip, 1848; Voluta tissotiana Crosse, 1867; Voluta volvacea Lamarck, 1811

= Cymbiola flavicans =

Species of gastropod

Cymbiola flavicans, common name the yellow volute, is a species of sea snail, a marine gastropod mollusk in the family Volutidae, the volutes.

== Description ==
The size of the shell varies between 60 mm and 100 mm.

(Original description in Latin as Voluta signifer): An ovate-fusiform shell, very densely marked with longitudinal lines, somewhat yellowish in color, banded with irregular, interrupted chestnut-brown markings. The spire is of moderate size, slightly swollen, with a somewhat sharp, nipple-like, smooth apex. It has three whorls, the body whorl by far the largest and somewhat inflated. The lip is sharp, and the columella bears four large folds.

Two bands composed of detached, reddish-brown, irregular, interrupted spots encircle the spiral whorls, while three such bands, with a faint indication of a fourth, ornament the body whorl. A broad space separates the upper two bands of the body whorl from the third and the faint trace of the fourth. An irregular, linear streak of the same colour runs longitudinally and centrally, linking the upper three bands. Indeed, the colouring generally appears to flow from the upper to the lower band within each pair. The terminal notch is very deep and is crowned by an unusually prominent raised ridge.

== Distribution ==
This marine species occurs off Papua New Guinea and Australia (Northern Territory, Queensland).
