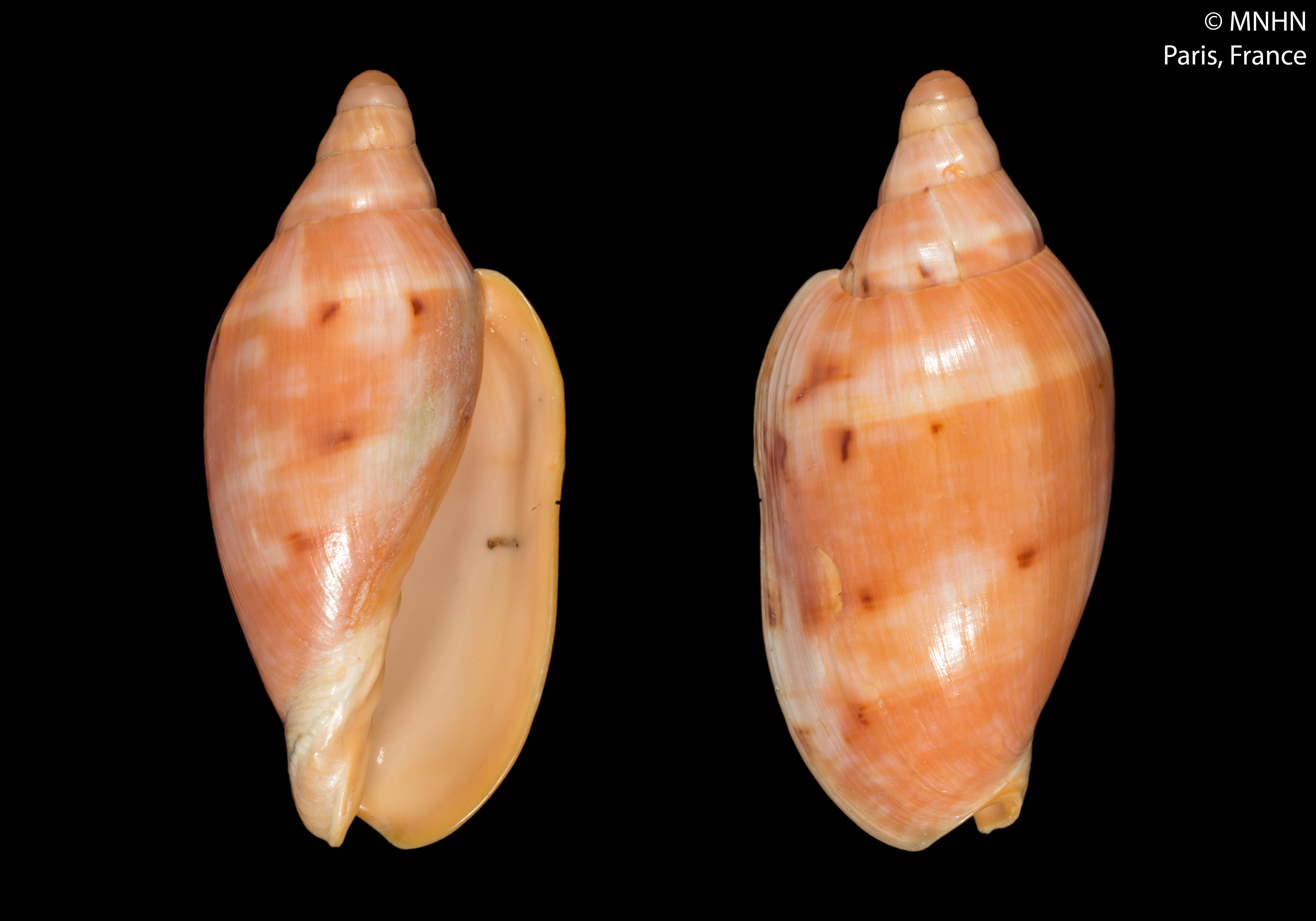
- Shell of Cymbiola malayensis (holotype at MNHN, Paris)

Scientific classification
- Kingdom: Animalia
- Phylum: Mollusca
- Class: Gastropoda
- Subclass: Caenogastropoda
- Order: Neogastropoda
- Family: Volutidae
- Genus: Cymbiola
- Species: C. malayensis

Binomial name
- Cymbiola malayensis Douté & Bail, 2000

Synonyms
- Cymbiola (Cymbiola) malayensis Douté & Bail, 2000 alternative representation

= Cymbiola malayensis =

Species of gastropod

Cymbiola malayensis is a species of sea snail, a marine gastropod mollusk in the family Volutidae, the volutes.

== Description ==
This well-patterned species attains a size of 125 mm.

== Distribution ==
This marine species occurs off Malaysia and the Philippines.
