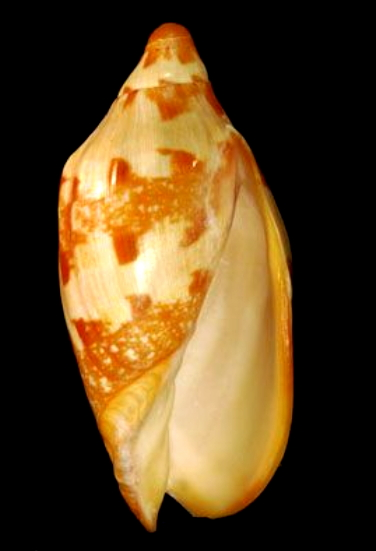
- Shell of Cymbiola palawanica (specimen at the Natural History Museum Rotterdam)

Scientific classification
- Kingdom: Animalia
- Phylum: Mollusca
- Class: Gastropoda
- Subclass: Caenogastropoda
- Order: Neogastropoda
- Family: Volutidae
- Genus: Cymbiola
- Species: C. palawanica

Binomial name
- Cymbiola palawanica Douté & Bail, 2000

Synonyms
- Cymbiola (Cymbiola) palawanica Douté & Bail, 2000 alternative representation

= Cymbiola palawanica =

Species of gastropod

Cymbiola palawanica is a species of sea snail, a marine gastropod mollusk in the family Volutidae, the volutes.

== Description ==
The length of the shell attains 90 mm.

== Distribution ==
This marine species occurs off the Philippines.
