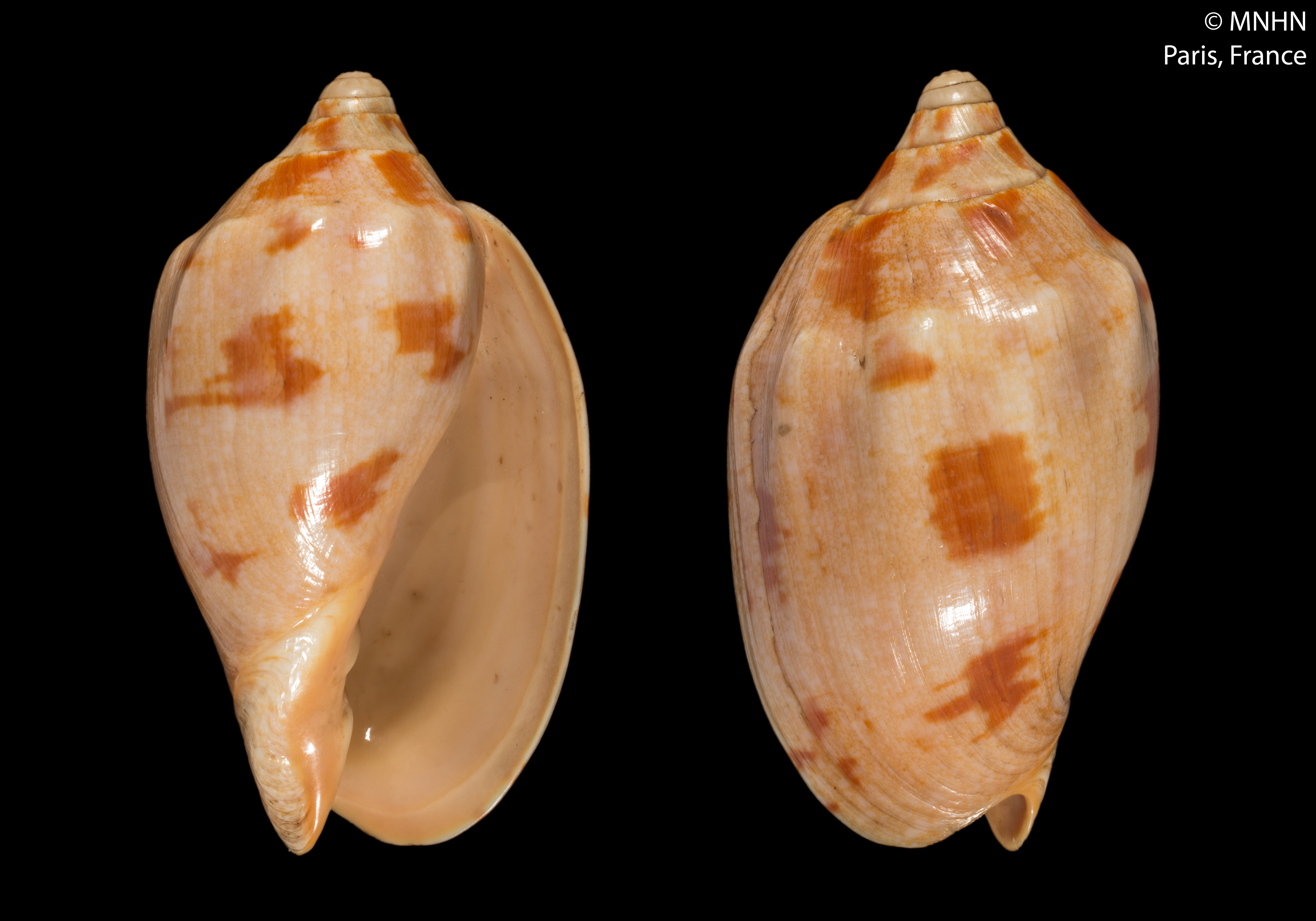
- Shell of Cymbiola rutila (syntype at MNHN, Paris)

Scientific classification
- Kingdom: Animalia
- Phylum: Mollusca
- Class: Gastropoda
- Subclass: Caenogastropoda
- Order: Neogastropoda
- Family: Volutidae
- Genus: Cymbiola
- Species: C. rutila

Binomial name
- Cymbiola rutila (Broderip, 1826)

Synonyms
- Cymbiola (Cymbiola) rutila (Broderip, 1826)· accepted, alternate representation; Voluta macgillivrayi Cox, 1873; Voluta norrisii Gray, 1838; Voluta piperita G. B. Sowerby I, 1844; Voluta rückeri Crosse, 1867; Voluta rückeri var. ceraunia Crosse, 1880; Voluta rueckeri Crosse, 1867; Voluta rutila Broderip, 1826 superseded combination

= Cymbiola rutila =

Species of gastropod

Cymbiola rutila, the blood-red volute, is a species of large sea snail, a marine gastropod mollusk in the family Volutidae, the volutes.

== Description ==
The shell attains a length of 74 mm.

(Original description) The shell is ovate-oblong in shape and displays a reddish or flesh-colored ground, thickly covered with confluent, somewhat triangular reticulations of saffron red. The spire is short, with an unarmed suture, and the apex is papillary and slightly granulated or beaded.

The body whorl is furnished with elongated tubercles and is ornamented with two broad, interrupted bands of a deeper and more vivid red. It is further marked with oblique, irregular stripes of the same color: in the tuberculated variety, these stripes extend from the suture to the tubercles, while in the smooth variety they run from the suture to the shoulder of the body whorl.

The columella is provided with four folds, of which the two lowest are the largest.

== Habitat ==
Volutes are predators that live in deep waters.

== Distribution ==
This marine species occurs off the Philippines, Papua New Guinea and Australia (Queensland, Western Australia.
