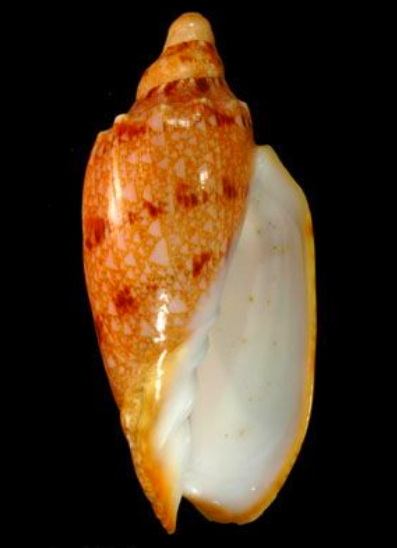
- Shell of Cymbiola innexa (specimen at the Natural History Museum Rotterdam)

Scientific classification
- Kingdom: Animalia
- Phylum: Mollusca
- Class: Gastropoda
- Subclass: Caenogastropoda
- Order: Neogastropoda
- Family: Volutidae
- Genus: Cymbiola
- Species: C. innexa

Binomial name
- Cymbiola innexa (Reeve, 1849)

Synonyms
- Cymbiola (Cymbiola) innexa (Reeve, 1849) alternative representation; Cymbiola marispuma Angioy & Biraghi, 1977; Voluta innexa Reeve, 1849 ·

= Cymbiola innexa =

Species of gastropod

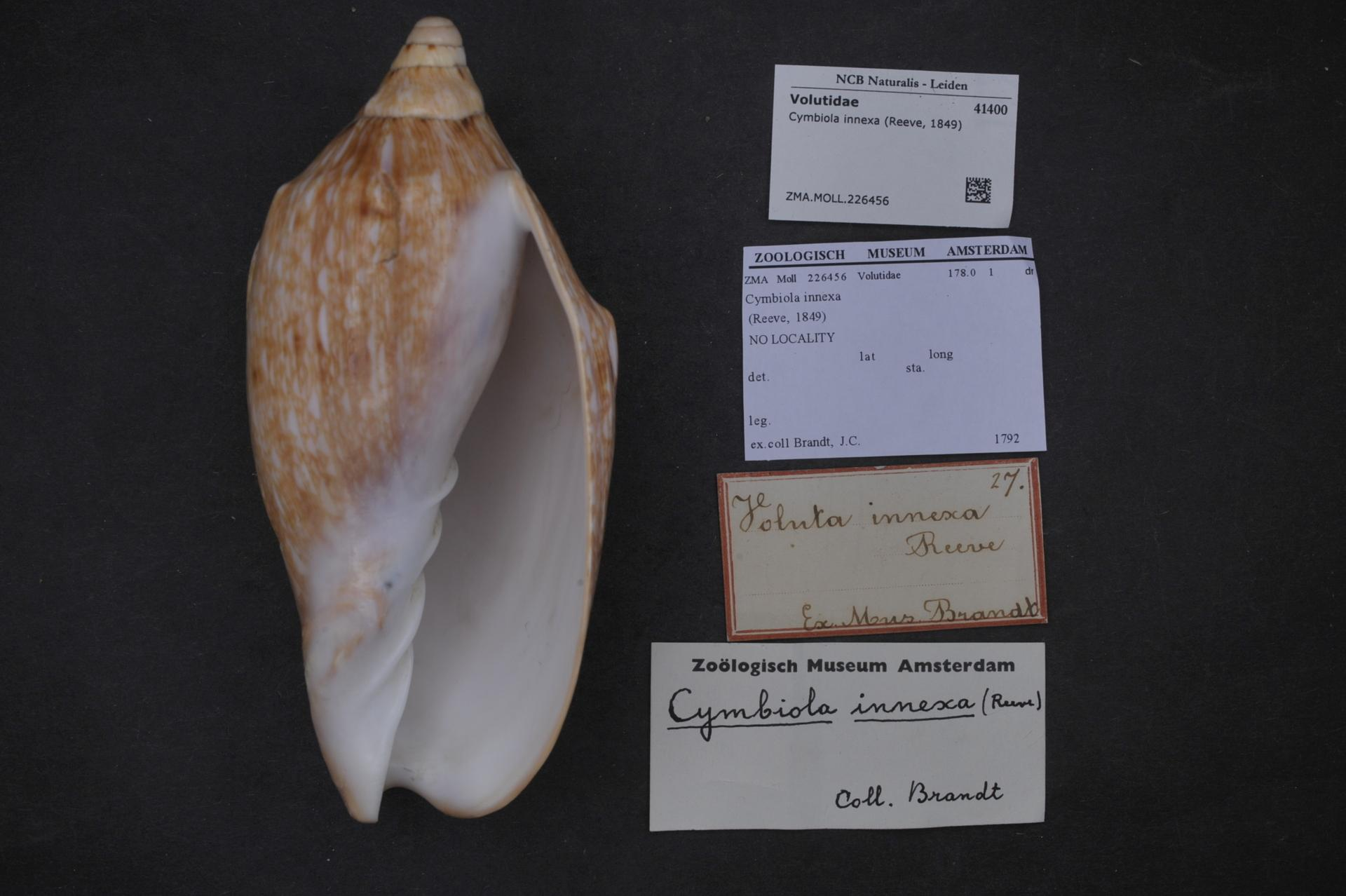
Cymbiola innexa

Cymbiola innexa is a species of sea snail, a marine gastropod mollusk in the family Volutidae, the volutes.

== Description ==
The length of the shell attains 95 mm.

(Original description) The shell is oblong-ovate with a rather short spire that forms a large, nodulous papilla at the apex. The whorls are smooth, slanting around the upper portion and appearing slightly angled, with nodose tubercles situated along the angle. The columella is strongly four-plaited. In color, the shell is flesh-white and longitudinally knitted throughout with very fine, scarlet-brown lines, further marked by three narrow, darker bands.

== Distribution ==
This marine species is primarily found in the Indo-Pacific, with notable populations around Indonesia (Java and East Java).
