= Cymbiola provocationis =

Scientific classification
- Kingdom: Animalia
- Phylum: Mollusca
- Class: Gastropoda
- Subclass: Caenogastropoda
- Order: Neogastropoda
- Family: Volutidae
- Genus: Cymbiola
- Species: C. provocationis

Binomial name
- Cymbiola provocationis (McMichael, 1961)

Synonyms
- Cymbiola (Cymbiolacca) pulchra provocationis (McMichael, 1961) (subgeneric classification uncertain); Cymbiola pulchra provocationis (McMichael, 1961); Pseudocymbiola provocationis McMichael, 1961 (original combination)

Species of gastropod

Cymbiola provocationis is a species of sea snail, a marine gastropod mollusk in the family Volutidae, the volutes.

== Distribution ==
This marine species is endemic to Australia and occurs off the New South Wales coast.
