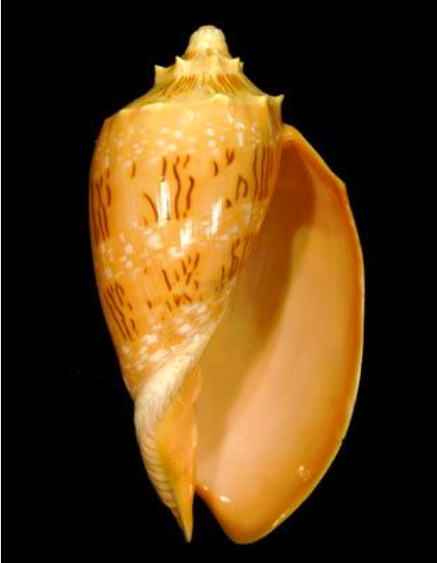
- Shell of Cymbiola irvinae (specimen at the Natural History Museum Rotterdam)

Scientific classification
- Kingdom: Animalia
- Phylum: Mollusca
- Class: Gastropoda
- Subclass: Caenogastropoda
- Order: Neogastropoda
- Family: Volutidae
- Genus: Cymbiola
- Species: C. irvinae

Binomial name
- Cymbiola irvinae (Smith, 1909)

Synonyms
- Cymbiola (Cymbiola) irvinae (E. A. Smith, 1909) alternative representation; Voluta irvinae E. A. Smith, 1909 (original combination)

= Cymbiola irvinae =

Species of gastropod

Cymbiola irvinae is a species of sea snail, a marine gastropod mollusc in the family Volutidae, the volutes.

== Description ==
The length of the shell attains 110 mm, its diameter 60 mm.

(Original description) The shell is oblong and almost pear-shaped, appearing rather ventricose. It is primarily a light salmon-red, adorned with numerous white flecks that form three distinct zones upon the body whorl: one at the shoulder or upper end, one in the center, and a third at the anterior. Two intermediate zones exist between these, which lack white flecks but are instead marked by numerous longitudinal, irregular, and wavy dark brown lines. Of these, the upper zone is the broader of the two and falls slightly above the middle of the whorl.

The shell consists of six whorls, with the first three forming a large, nipple-like apex that is noduled above. The penultimate whorl is oblique and excavated at the top; it then becomes angled and is coronated with approximately fourteen small, short, hollow spines. Similarly, the body whorl is excavated above and features a matching coronation of about twenty spines, rounding out at the shoulder beneath them.

The concavity of these two whorls exhibits numerous radiating dark brown streaks of varying lengths, while the anterior end and the fasciole of the body whorl are marked by fine, wavy red lines. The aperture is large and whitish within, gradually turning orange toward the lip. Inside, the band of dark lines forms an obscure central zone. The outer lip is not thickened and is rather deeply sinuated at the suture. Finally, the columellar folds are four in number, white and prominent, while the extreme end of the columella displays a vibrant orange-red hue.

== Distribution ==
This marine species is endemic to Australia and occurs off Western Australia.
