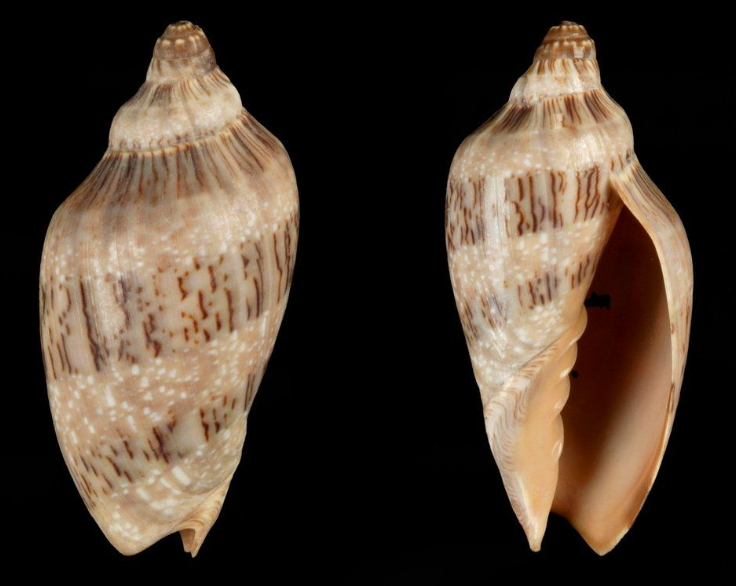
- Shell of Cymbiola nivosa (specimen at the Denver Museum of Nature & Science)

Scientific classification
- Kingdom: Animalia
- Phylum: Mollusca
- Class: Gastropoda
- Subclass: Caenogastropoda
- Order: Neogastropoda
- Family: Volutidae
- Genus: Cymbiola
- Species: C. nivosa

Binomial name
- Cymbiola nivosa (Lamarck, 1804)

Synonyms
- Cymbiola (Aulicina) nivosa (Lamarck, 1804); Cymbiola (Cymbiola) nivosa (Lamarck, 1804)· accepted, alternate representation; Voluta nivosa Lamarck, 1804 (original combination); Voluta norrisii G.B. Sowerby I, 1845

= Cymbiola nivosa =

Species of gastropod

Cymbiola nivosa, common name the blotched snowflake volute, ' is a species of sea snail, a marine gastropod mollusk in the family Volutidae, the volutes.

Subspecies

- Cymbiola nivosa nivosa (Lamarck, 1804)
- Cymbiola nivosa oblita (E. A. Smith, 1909): synonym of Cymbiola oblita (E. A. Smith, 1909) (superseded rank)

== Description ==
The length of the shell varies between 65 mm and 70 mm.

(Described as Voluta norrisii) The shell is ovate and somewhat oblong in form, with a ventricose and coronated appearance. It is greyish brown in color, sprinkled with small snow-white and brown specks, and encircled by two transverse, interrupted brown bands, here and there marked with broken longitudinal lines. The spire is short and terminates in a papillary, granose apex. It consists of six whorls, the last two of which are crowned with short, sharp spines. The aperture is large and oblong, brown within, and the columella bears four folds, of which the two anterior folds are especially prominent.

== Distribution ==
This marine species is endemic to Australia and occurs off Western Australia.
