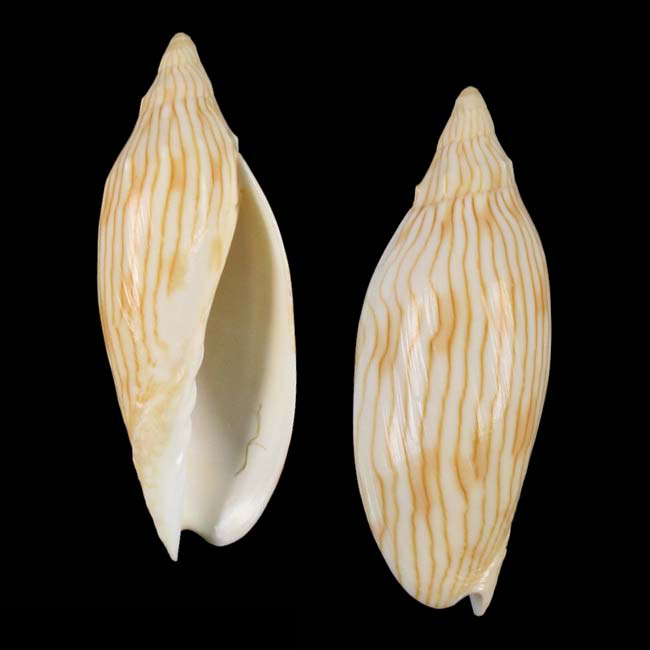

Scientific classification
- Kingdom: Animalia
- Phylum: Mollusca
- Class: Gastropoda
- Subclass: Caenogastropoda
- Order: Neogastropoda
- Family: Volutidae
- Genus: Cymbiola
- Species: C. intruderi

Binomial name
- Cymbiola intruderi (Poppe, 1985)

Synonyms
- Cymbiola (Cymbiolacca) intruderi (Poppe, 1985) alternative representation; Cymbiolacca intruderi Poppe, 1985

= Cymbiola intruderi =

Species of gastropod

Cymbiola intruderi is a species of sea snail, a marine gastropod mollusk in the family Volutidae, the volutes.

Subspecies

- Cymbiola intruderi intruderi (Poppe, 1985)
- Cymbiola intruderi rowseorum Bail & Limpus, 2015

== Description ==
The length of the shell attains 92 mm.

== Distribution ==
This marine species is endemic to Australia and occurs off Queensland.
