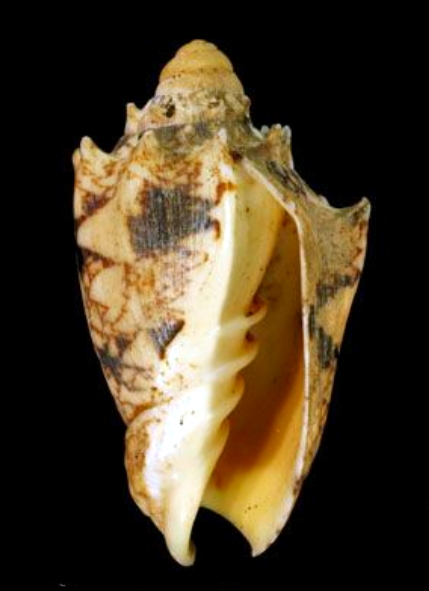
- Shell of Cymbiola chrysostoma (specimen at the Natural History Museum Rotterdam)

Scientific classification
- Kingdom: Animalia
- Phylum: Mollusca
- Class: Gastropoda
- Subclass: Caenogastropoda
- Order: Neogastropoda
- Family: Volutidae
- Genus: Cymbiola
- Species: C. chrysostoma

Binomial name
- Cymbiola chrysostoma (Swainson, 1824)

Synonyms
- Cymbiola (Cymbiola) chrysostoma (Swainson, 1824) alternative representation; Voluta chrysostoma Swainson, 1824; Voluta luteostoma Deshayes in Lamarck, 1844

= Cymbiola chrysostoma =

Species of gastropod

Cymbiola chrysostoma is a species of sea snail, a marine gastropod mollusk in the family Volutidae, the volutes.

Subspecies

- Cymbiola chrysostoma chrysostoma (Swainson, 1824)
- Cymbiola chrysostoma stimpsonorum T. Cossignani & Allary, 2022

== Description ==
The length of the shell attains 46 mm.

(Original description) The shell is ovate and possesses a clean white base, patterned with angulated chestnut lines and dark spots. The whorls are uniquely crowned by a series of short, concave spines that give the shell a rugged, defensive profile.

The apex is thick and obtuse, with a smooth texture that contrasts with the armored appearance of the lower whorls. Internally, the aperture is a rich, striking golden hue.

== Distribution ==
This marine species occurs off Sulawesi, Indonesia
