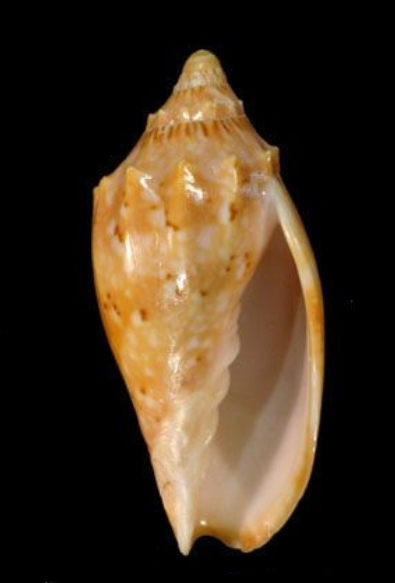
- Shell of Cymbiola moretonensis (specimen at the Natural History Museum Rotterdam)

Scientific classification
- Kingdom: Animalia
- Phylum: Mollusca
- Class: Gastropoda
- Subclass: Caenogastropoda
- Order: Neogastropoda
- Family: Volutidae
- Genus: Cymbiola
- Species: C. moretonensis

Binomial name
- Cymbiola moretonensis Bail & Limpus, 1998

Synonyms
- Cymbiola (Cymbiolacca) moretonensis Bail & Limpus, 1998 alternative representation; Cymbiola (Cymbiolacca) pulchra moretonensis Bail & Limpus, 1998 superseded rank; Cymbiola pulchra moretonensis Bail & Limpus, 1998 superseded rank

= Cymbiola moretonensis =

Species of gastropod

Cymbiola moretonensis is a species of sea snail, a marine gastropod mollusk in the family Volutidae.

== Description ==
The length of the shell attains 53 mm.

== Distribution ==
This marine species is endemic to Australia and occurs off Queensland.
