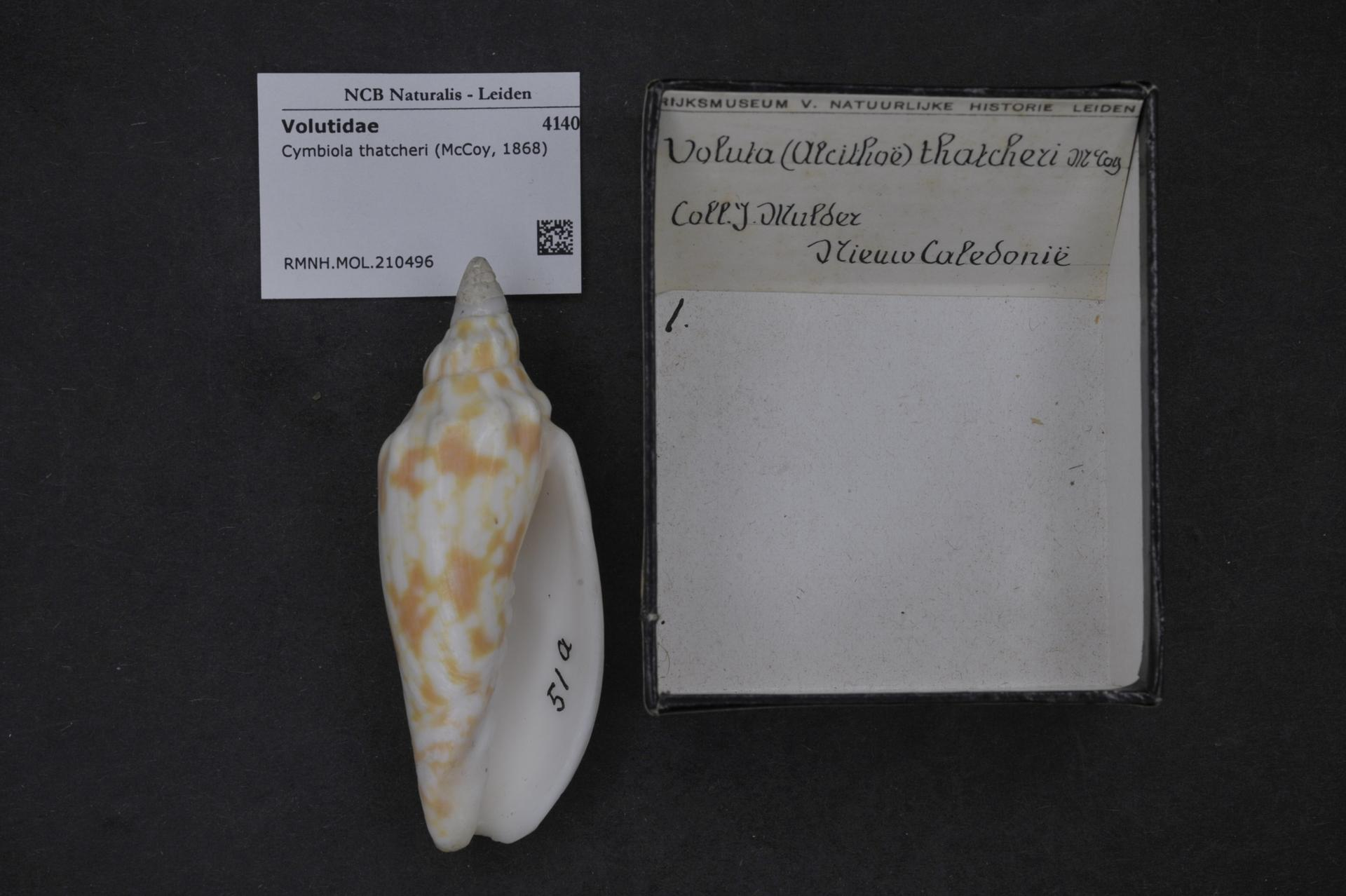

Scientific classification
- Kingdom: Animalia
- Phylum: Mollusca
- Class: Gastropoda
- Subclass: Caenogastropoda
- Order: Neogastropoda
- Family: Volutidae
- Genus: Cymbiola
- Species: C. thatcheri

Binomial name
- Cymbiola thatcheri (McCoy, 1868)

Synonyms
- Cymbiola (Cymbiolacca) thatcheri (McCoy, 1868); Cymbiola (Magnavictoria) thatcheri (McCoy, 1868) alternative representation; Cymbiolacca thatcheri (McCoy, 1868); Voluta brazieri Brazier, 1870; Voluta thatcheri McCoy, 1868 (original combination)

= Cymbiola thatcheri =

Species of gastropod

Cymbiola thatcheri is a species of sea snail, a marine gastropod mollusk in the family Volutidae, the volutes.

== Description ==
(Original description) The shell is slender and elongately fusiform, (with its greatest width situated near the middle of the body whorl) measuring only about half the length of that whorl. The penultimate whorl bears approximately ten tubercles, placed slightly below the middle. On the shoulder of the body whorl there are only about seven tubercles, as they become obsolete near the outer lip.

The columella is furnished with seven thick folds, of which the two posterior are smaller than the others, while the remaining plaits are nearly equal in size.

The ground color of the shell is white. Along the suture runs a row of elongate, quadrangular spots, and the body whorl is encircled by two broad spiral bands of hieroglyphic markings—one situated just below the tubercles and the other near the anterior extremity. In front of the latter band there appears an irregular row of small, quadrate spots. All the markings are of a pale yellowish-brown, or burnt-sienna, hue, and faint traces of a yellowish reticulation may be observed in the spaces between the bands.

== Distribution ==
This marine species occurs off New Caledonia and Australia.
