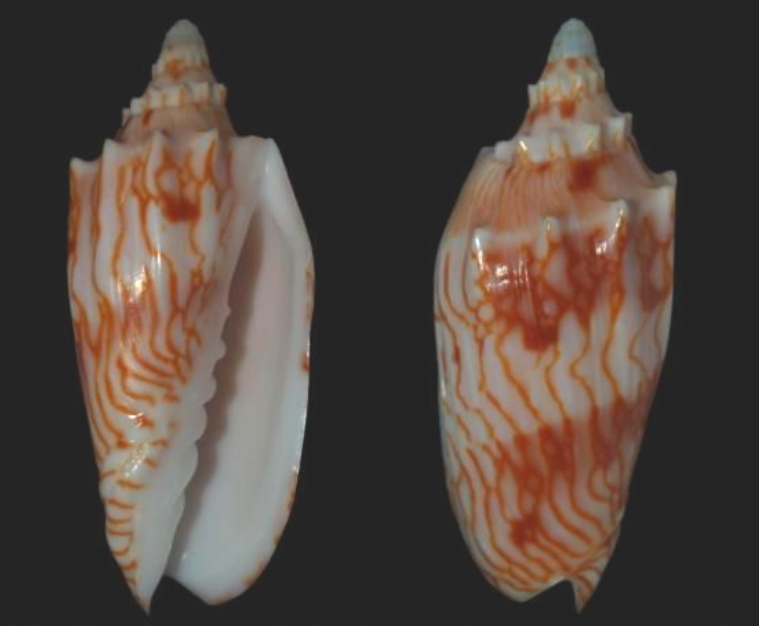
- Shell of Cymbiola perplicata (specimen at Atlas of Living Australia)

Scientific classification
- Kingdom: Animalia
- Phylum: Mollusca
- Class: Gastropoda
- Subclass: Caenogastropoda
- Order: Neogastropoda
- Family: Volutidae
- Genus: Cymbiola
- Species: C. perplicata

Binomial name
- Cymbiola perplicata (Hedley, 1902)

Synonyms
- Cymbiola (Cymbiolacca) perplicata (Hedley, 1902); Cymbiola (Magnavictoria) perplicata (Hedley, 1902) alternative representation; Cymbiolacca perplicata (Hedley, 1902) superseded combination; Voluta perplicata Hedley, 1902 (original combination)

= Cymbiola perplicata =

Species of gastropod

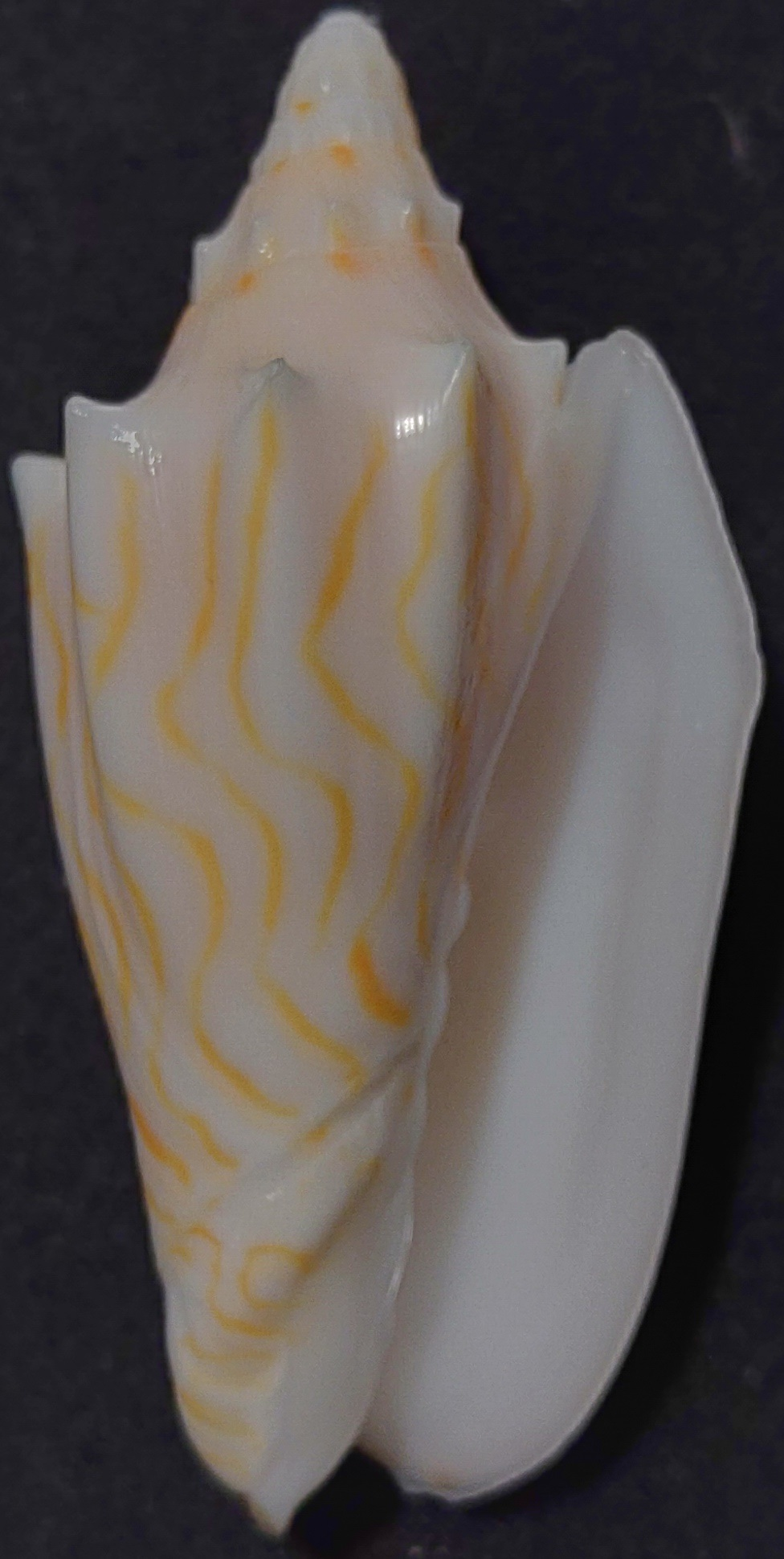

Cymbiola perplicata, common name the reticulated volute, is a species of sea snail, a marine gastropod mollusk in the family Volutidae, the volutes.

Subspecies

- Cymbiola perplicata lihouensis Poppe & Tagaro, 2020
- Cymbiola perplicata mattiskei Poppe & Tagaro, 2020
- Cymbiola perplicata perplicata (Hedley, 1902)
- Cymbiola perplicata ronmoylani Poppe & Tagaro, 2020

== Description ==
The length of the shell attains 75 mm, its diameter 32 mm.

(Original description) The shell is broadly fusiform, concave beneath the suture, distinctly angled at the shoulder, and gradually tapering toward the base. It is solid and glossy in texture. Its coloration consists of a white ground marked with numerous, well-spaced, narrow, undulating longitudinal orange lines. Beneath the shoulder and around the periphery, faint, broad, and suffused spiral bands of the same orange hue are visible.

The sculpture consists of about nine longitudinal ribs, which arise gradually near the center of each whorl, enlarge rapidly, and terminate abruptly in blunt tubercles at the shoulder. On the upper whorls, these tubercles persist, becoming finer and more closely set as they merge into the ribbing of the apex. A distinct basal funicle is present, interrupting the color pattern and entering the aperture between the third and fourth fold.

The shell consists of six whorls, three of which are apical. The apical whorls are oblique to the main axis, causing the first adult whorl to appear more immersed on one side. The aperture is narrow, and the columella bears six plications; the uppermost is doubled in one specimen, and the folds become progressively smaller and more transverse toward the top.

== Distribution ==
This marine species is endemic to Australia and occurs in the Coral Sea and off Queensland.
