= Cymbiola cracenta =

Scientific classification
- Kingdom: Animalia
- Phylum: Mollusca
- Class: Gastropoda
- Subclass: Caenogastropoda
- Order: Neogastropoda
- Family: Volutidae
- Genus: Cymbiola
- Species: C. cracenta

Binomial name
- Cymbiola cracenta (McMichael, 1963)

Synonyms
- Cymbiola (Cymbiolacca) cracenta (McMichael, 1963) alternative representation; Cymbiola (Cymbiolacca) pulchra cracenta (McMichael, 1963); Cymbiola pulchra cracenta (McMichael, 1963); Cymbiolacca cracenta McMichael, 1963 (original combination)

Species of gastropod

Cymbiola cracenta, common name the red volute, is a species of sea snail, a marine gastropod mollusk in the family Volutidae, the volutes.

== Distribution ==
This species is endemic to Australia and occurs off Queensland.
