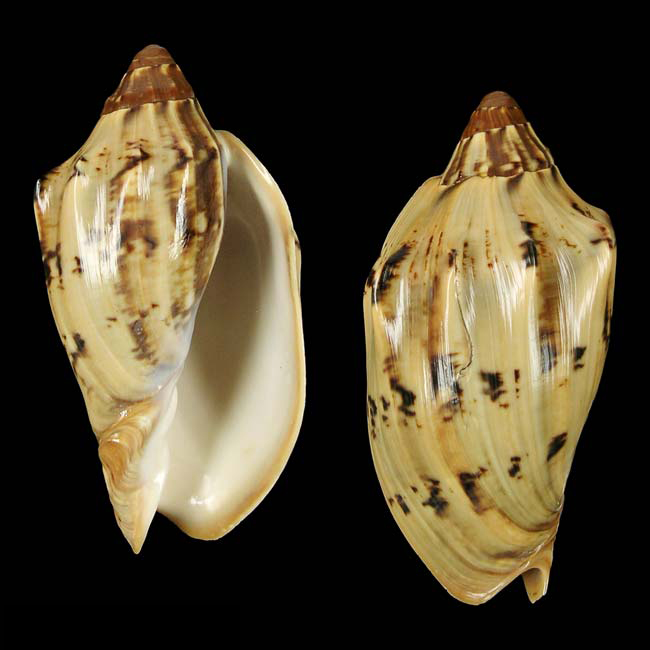

Scientific classification
- Kingdom: Animalia
- Phylum: Mollusca
- Class: Gastropoda
- Subclass: Caenogastropoda
- Order: Neogastropoda
- Family: Volutidae
- Genus: Cymbiola
- Species: C. laminusa

Binomial name
- Cymbiola laminusa Poppe, Tagaro & Bail, 2011

= Cymbiola laminusa =

Species of gastropod

Cymbiola laminusa is a species of sea snail, a marine gastropod mollusk in the family Volutidae.

== Distribution ==
This marine species occurs off the Philippines.

== Original description ==
- Poppe G.T., Tagaro S.P. & Bail P. (2011) Notes on the genus Cymbiola in the Philippines, with the redefinition of Cymbiola cathcartiae Reeve, 1856 and the description of Cymbiola laminusa n.sp. Visaya 3(4): 76-87. [November 2011] page(s): 76.
