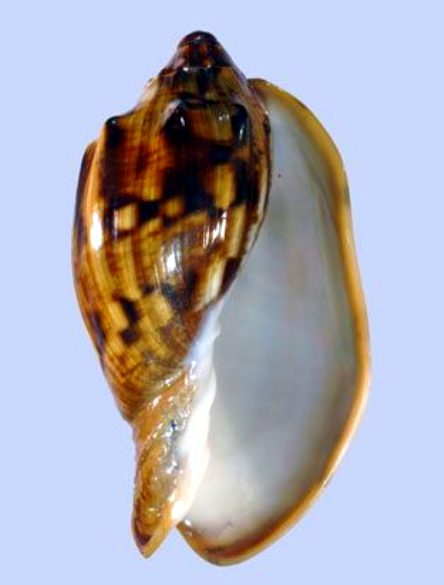
- Shell of Cymbiola cathcartiae (specimen at the Natural History Museum Rotterdam)

Scientific classification
- Kingdom: Animalia
- Phylum: Mollusca
- Class: Gastropoda
- Subclass: Caenogastropoda
- Order: Neogastropoda
- Family: Volutidae
- Genus: Cymbiola
- Species: C. cathcartiae

Binomial name
- Cymbiola cathcartiae (Reeve, 1856)

Synonyms
- Cymbiola (Cymbiola) cathcartiae (Reeve, 1856) alternative representation; Voluta cathcartiae Reeve, 1856 superseded combination

= Cymbiola cathcartiae =

Species of gastropod

Cymbiola cathcartiae is a species of sea snail, a marine gastropod mollusk in the family Volutidae, the volutes.

== Description ==
The length of the shell attains 102 mm.

(Original description in Latin) The shell is cylindrically oblong with a recurved base and a short spire that terminates in a papillary (nipple-like) apex. The whorls are characterized by a concave slope at the top, becoming nearly flattened thereafter. The columella is quadriplicate, featuring four folds that descend toward the base. The aperture is elongated and somewhat narrow, bounded by a simple, curved lip.

In terms of coloration, the shell is an orange-tawny hue, marked by three interrupted bands of blackish-purple spots, suggesting a complex, marbled elegance. These spots are highly irregular and variously clouded. Additionally, the suture of the whorls is peculiarly painted and spotted.

== Distribution ==
Indo-Pacific region: Philippines, Sulawesi, (Indonesia)
