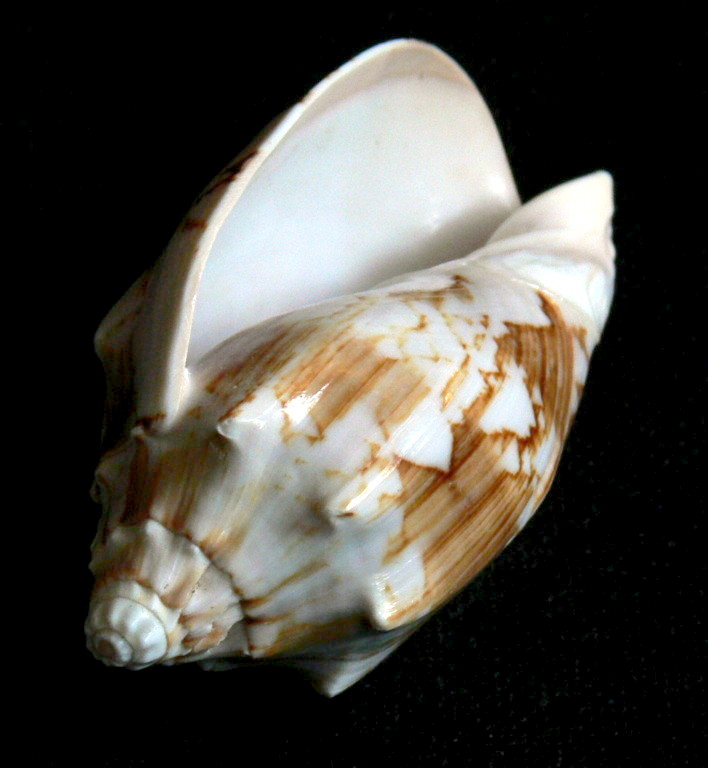
- A shell of Cymbiola vespertilio

Scientific classification
- Kingdom: Animalia
- Phylum: Mollusca
- Class: Gastropoda
- Subclass: Caenogastropoda
- Order: Neogastropoda
- Family: Volutidae
- Genus: Cymbiola
- Species: C. vespertilio

Binomial name
- Cymbiola vespertilio Linnaeus, 1758

Synonyms
- Cymbiola (Cymbiola) vespertilio (Linnaeus, 1758); Voluta lineolata Küster, H.C., 1841; Voluta mitis Lamarck, 1811; Voluta pellisserpentis Lamarck, J.B.P.A. de, 1811; Voluta serpentina Lamarck, J.B.P.A. de, 1811; Voluta vespertilio Linnaeus, 1758 (basionym)

= Cymbiola vespertilio =

Species of gastropod

Cymbiola vespertilio, common name the bat volute, is a species of large predatory sea snail, a marine gastropod mollusk in the family Volutidae, the volutes.

Subspecies

- Cymbiola vespertilio peterstimpsoni T. Cossignani & Allary, 2022
- Cymbiola vespertilio vespertilio (Linnaeus, 1758)

== Distribution ==
This is a Central Indo-Pacific species, found off the Philippines and Northern Australia.

== Description ==
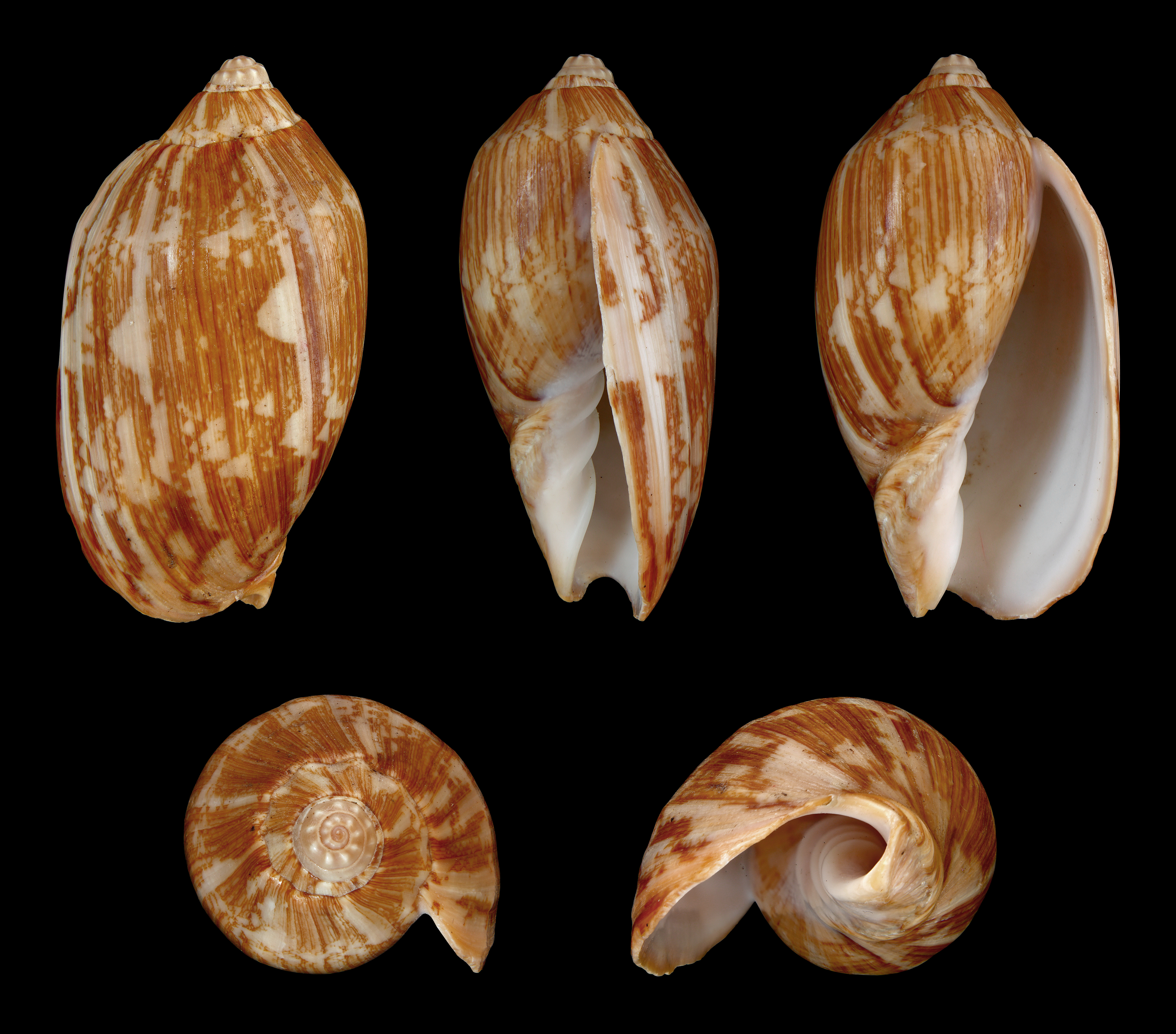
Shell of Cymbiola vespertilio ssp. mitis

The size of an adult shell varies between 45 mm and 160 mm.

(Described in Latin as Voluta mitis) The shell is ovate-oblong and somewhat turbinated in form, and it displays a variegated appearance. It is marked with angular, chestnut-brown flames. The earlier whorls are ornamented with tuberculate nodules, while the body whorl is smooth and without such projections.
