= Cymbiola nusatenggara =

Scientific classification
- Kingdom: Animalia
- Phylum: Mollusca
- Class: Gastropoda
- Subclass: Caenogastropoda
- Order: Neogastropoda
- Family: Volutidae
- Genus: Cymbiola
- Species: C. nusatenggara

Binomial name
- Cymbiola nusatenggara Crabos, 2025

Species of gastropod

Cymbiola nusatenggara is a species of sea snail, a marine gastropod mollusk in the family Volutidae, the volutes.

== Distribution ==
This marine species is endemic to Indonesia and was found off Mojo Island, West Nusa Tenggara, South East Indonesia, in 20 m.
