= Cymbiola hughmorrisoni =

Scientific classification
- Kingdom: Animalia
- Phylum: Mollusca
- Class: Gastropoda
- Subclass: Caenogastropoda
- Order: Neogastropoda
- Family: Volutidae
- Genus: Cymbiola
- Species: C. hughmorrisoni

Binomial name
- Cymbiola hughmorrisoni Bail & Limpus, 1997

Species of gastropod

Cymbiola hughmorrisoni is a species of sea snail, a marine gastropod mollusk in the family Volutidae, the volutes.

== Distribution ==
This marine species is endemic to Australia and occurs off Western Australia.
