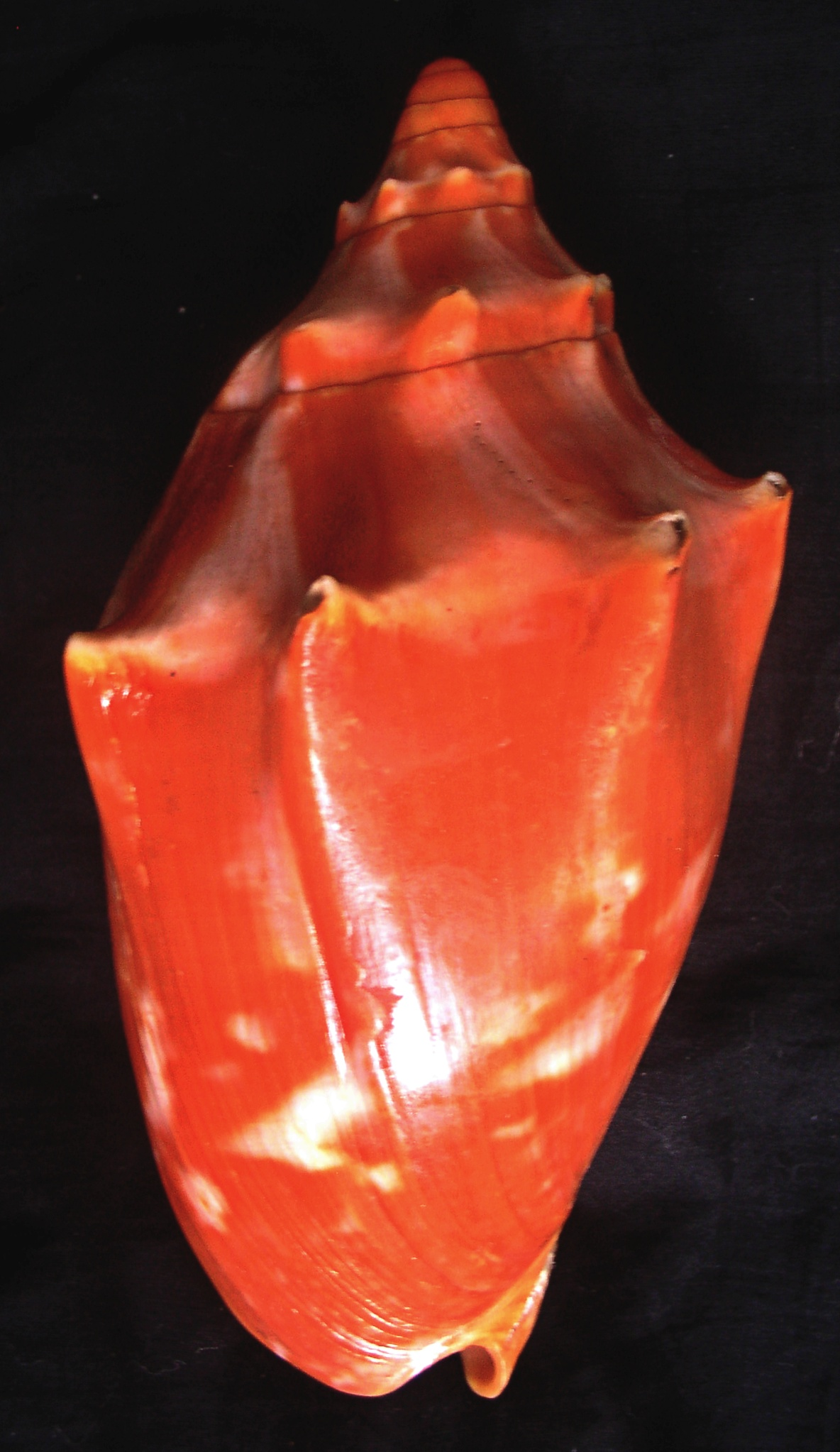
- A Shell of Cymbiola aulica aulica (red subspecies)

Scientific classification
- Kingdom: Animalia
- Phylum: Mollusca
- Class: Gastropoda
- Subclass: Caenogastropoda
- Order: Neogastropoda
- Family: Volutidae
- Genus: Cymbiola
- Species: C. aulica

Binomial name
- Cymbiola aulica (G.B. Sowerby I, 1825)

Synonyms
- Cymbiola (Cymbiola) aulica ([Lightfoot], 1786) alternative representation; Voluta aulica George Brettingham Sowerby I, 1825

= Cymbiola aulica =

Species of gastropod

Cymbiola aulica, also known as the princely or courtier volute, is a species of sea snail, a marine gastropod mollusk in the family Volutidae, the volutes.

== Distribution ==
This species is present in the Southern Philippines (Sulu Sea).

== Description ==
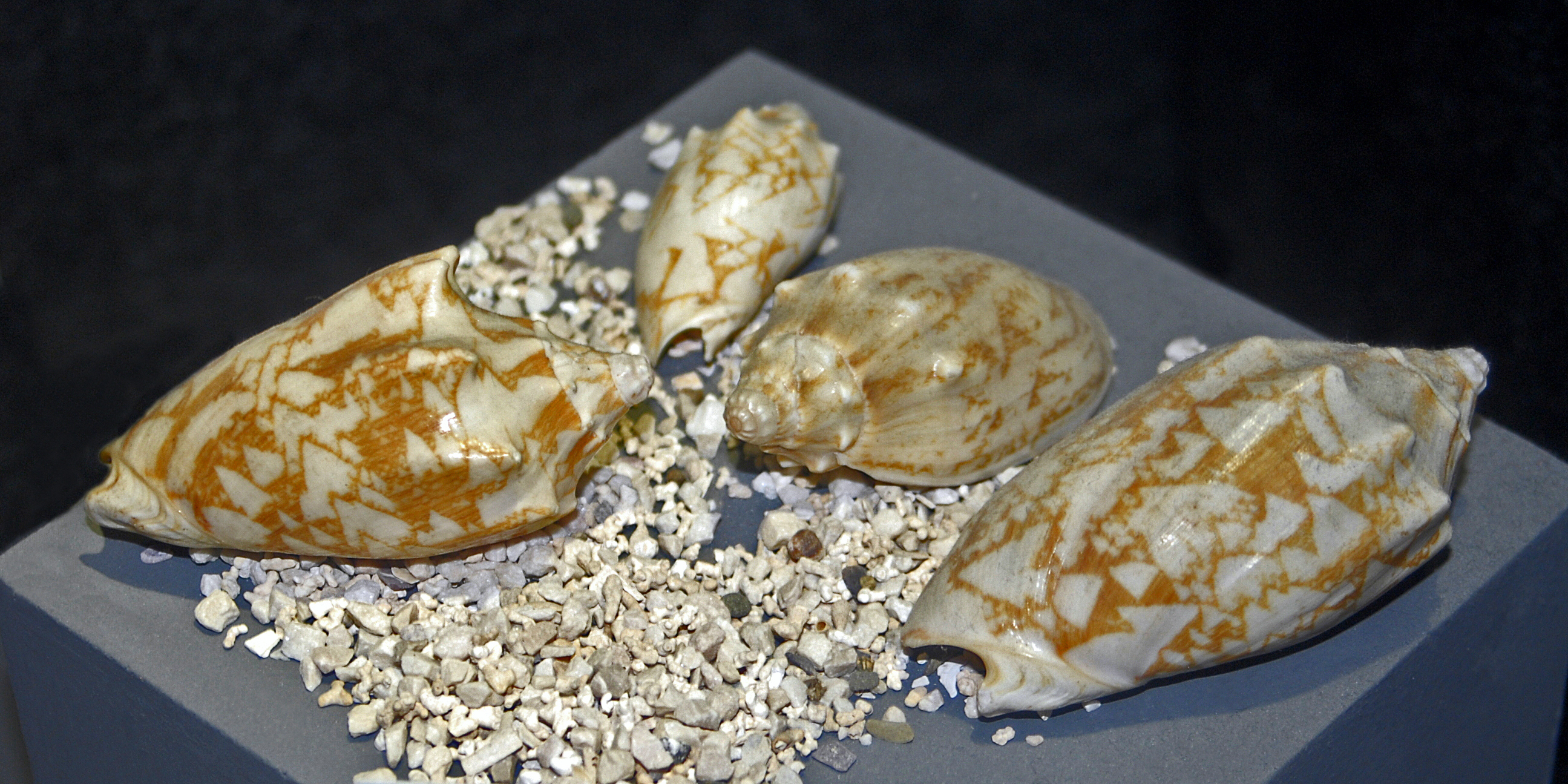
Shells of Cymbiola vespertilio

Shells of Cymbiola aulica can reach a size of 75–165 millimetres (3.0–6.5 in). These large shells are solid to thick, ovate, completely smooth, with subconical spire and sharp nodules on shoulders of whorls. Siphonal notch is narrow and deep. Columella shows six plaits. The aperture is usually wide orange with hues of greyish blue. The colour pattern of the external surface of these Schnecke is very variable, ranging from reddish to orange or whitish with brown markings and zig zag lines.

== Habitat ==
These sea snails live in sandy and muddy substrate at depths of 5 to 40 m.

== Bibliography ==
- Bail P. & Poppe G.T. 2001. A conchological iconography: a taxonomic introduction of the recent Volutidae. ConchBooks, Hackenheim.
- Harald Douté, M. A. Fontana Angioy - Volutes, The Doute collection
- Hsi-Jen Tao - Shells of Taiwan Illustrated in Colour - National Museum of Natural Science
- MacDonald & Co (1979) The MacDonald Encyclopedia of Shells. MacDonald & Co. London & Sydney
- Springsteen, F.J. & Leobrera, F.M. 1986. Shells of the Philippines. Carfel Seashell Museum, Philippines
