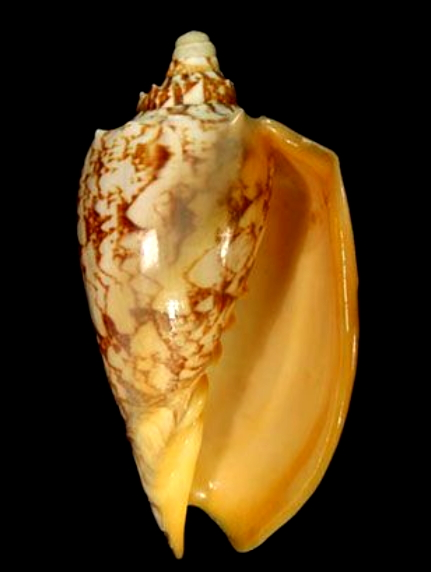
- Shell of Cymbiola rossiniana (specimen at the Natural History Museum Rotterdam)

Scientific classification
- Kingdom: Animalia
- Phylum: Mollusca
- Class: Gastropoda
- Subclass: Caenogastropoda
- Order: Neogastropoda
- Family: Volutidae
- Genus: Cymbiola
- Species: C. rossiniana

Binomial name
- Cymbiola rossiniana (Bernardi, 1859)

Synonyms
- Cymbiola (Cymbiola) rossiniana (Bernardi, 1859) · alternative representation; Voluta rossiniana Bernardi, 1859

= Cymbiola rossiniana =

Species of gastropod

Cymbiola rossiniana is a species of sea snail, a marine gastropod mollusk in the family Volutidae, the volutes.

== Description ==
C. rossiniana has a body length up to 124.5 mm.

Larger shells of 150 mm. are known to exist.

(Original description in Latin) The shell is ovate and scarcely elongated. It has eight whorls: the first four are nipple-shaped, rounded, blunt, and smooth; the next three gradually increase in size and are spiny. The body whorl is very large, expanded, and somewhat keeled, armed with 10–12 short, strong spines. It is sculptured with faint longitudinal ribs and is white-yellow in color, marked with angular red spots. The suture is scarcely impressed.

The aperture is crescent-shaped, posteriorly two-angled and thickened with a callus. The peristome is furnished with five strong, orange-colored teeth; the right margin is thick and yellow.

== Distribution ==
This marine species is endemic to New Caledonia.
