= Cymbiola cooperi =

Scientific classification
- Kingdom: Animalia
- Phylum: Mollusca
- Class: Gastropoda
- Subclass: Caenogastropoda
- Order: Neogastropoda
- Family: Volutidae
- Genus: Cymbiola
- Species: C. cooperi

Binomial name
- Cymbiola cooperi Petuch & Berschauer, 2024

Species of gastropod

Cymbiola cooperi is a species of sea snail, a marine gastropod mollusk in the family Volutidae, the volutes.

== Distribution ==
This species is endemic to Australia and occurs off Western Australia.
