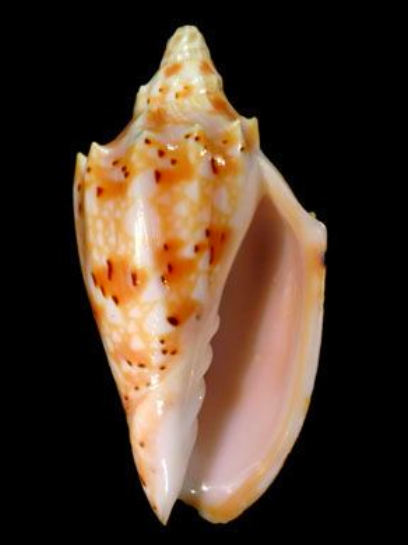
- Shell of Cymbiola pulchra (specimen at Natural History Museum Rotterdam)

Scientific classification
- Kingdom: Animalia
- Phylum: Mollusca
- Class: Gastropoda
- Subclass: Caenogastropoda
- Order: Neogastropoda
- Family: Volutidae
- Genus: Cymbiola
- Species: C. pulchra

Binomial name
- Cymbiola pulchra (G.B. Sowerby I, 1825)

Synonyms
- Cymbiola (Cymbiolacca) pulchra (G. B. Sowerby I, 1825) · alternative representation; Cymbiolacca pulchra (G.B.Sowerby I, 1825); Voluta punctata Swainson, 1823

= Cymbiola pulchra =

Species of gastropod

Cymbiola pulchra is a species of sea snail, a marine gastropod mollusk in the family Volutidae, the volutes.

== Subspecies ==
- Cymbiola pulchra coucomorum Bail & Limpus, 1998
- Cymbiola pulchra excelsior Bail & Limpus, 1998
- Cymbiola pulchra flindersi Bail & Limpus, 2015
- Cymbiola pulchra mariachristina Pozzi, 2023
- Cymbiola pulchra peristicta McMichael, 1963
- Cymbiola pulchra pulchra (G. B. Sowerby I, 1825)
- Cymbiola pulchra wisemani (Brazier, 1870)

== Description ==
Adult shells generally range from about 41 to 110 mm in length.

The shell of Cymbiola pulchra is solid, smooth, and glossy, and it is highly variable in appearance. The rounded protoconch consists of three-and-a-half ribbed whorls. The shell has a moderately tall spire that gives the shell an elegant, elongated profile. The whorls are distinctly shouldered, being concave above and convex below the shoulder, and they often bear nodules or short, sharp spines along the angular shoulder. The aperture is long and wide. The lip is bevelled. The columella is slightly concave and shows four plaits. The siphonal canal is deep and narrow.

The coloration typically consists of a white, fawn, or salmon-colored base, frequently marked with three darker spiral bands. In addition, the surface usually displays a pattern of spots, dots, and tent-shaped markings, which can vary widely between subspecies. The columella, or inner shell lip, bears four strong folds, a characteristic feature of volutes.

== Distribution ==
This marine species is endemic to Australia and occurs off Queensland.
