= Cymbiola baili =

Scientific classification
- Kingdom: Animalia
- Phylum: Mollusca
- Class: Gastropoda
- Subclass: Caenogastropoda
- Order: Neogastropoda
- Family: Volutidae
- Genus: Cymbiola
- Species: C. baili

Binomial name
- Cymbiola baili Prati & Raybaudi, 1997

Synonyms
- Cymbiola (Cymbiola) baili Prati & Raybaudi, 1996 · alternative representation

Species of gastropod

Cymbiola baili is a species of sea snail, a marine gastropod mollusk in the family Volutidae, the volutes.

== Distribution ==
This species occurs in the Timor Sea and also off Western Australia .
