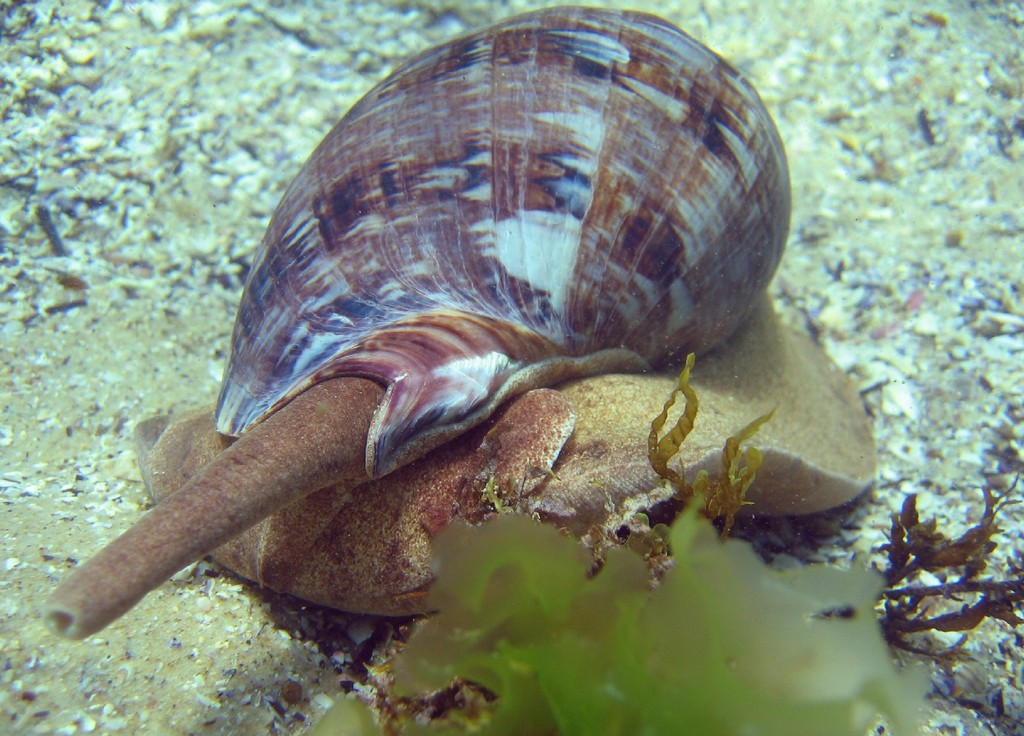

Scientific classification
- Kingdom: Animalia
- Phylum: Mollusca
- Class: Gastropoda
- Subclass: Caenogastropoda
- Order: Neogastropoda
- Family: Volutidae
- Genus: Cymbiola
- Species: C. magnifica

Binomial name
- Cymbiola magnifica (Gebauer, 1802)

Synonyms
- Cymbiola (Cymbiola) magnifica (Gebauer, 1802) alternative representation; Cymbiolena magnifica (Gebauer, 1802) superseded combination; Cymbiolena magnifica altispira Mayblom, 1951; Voluta magnifica Gebauer, 1802 ·

= Cymbiola magnifica =

Species of gastropod

Cymbiola magnifica, common name the magnificent volute, is a species of large sea snail, a marine gastropod mollusk in the family Volutidae, the volutes. It is one of the most striking and largest species of volute snails in the ocean.

Subspecies

- Cymbiola magnifica altispira (Mayblom, 1951)
- Cymbiola magnifica evansi Bondarev, 1996
- Cymbiola magnifica magnifica (Gebauer, 1802)

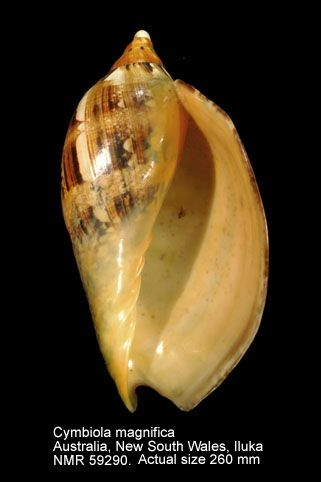
Cymbiola magnifica - specimen in the Natural History Museum Rotterdam

== Description ==
The length of the adult shells reaches 160–361 mm in length, typically about 250 mm.

== Distribution ==
This marine species is endemic to Australia and occurs off New South Wales, Queensland and Victoria.
