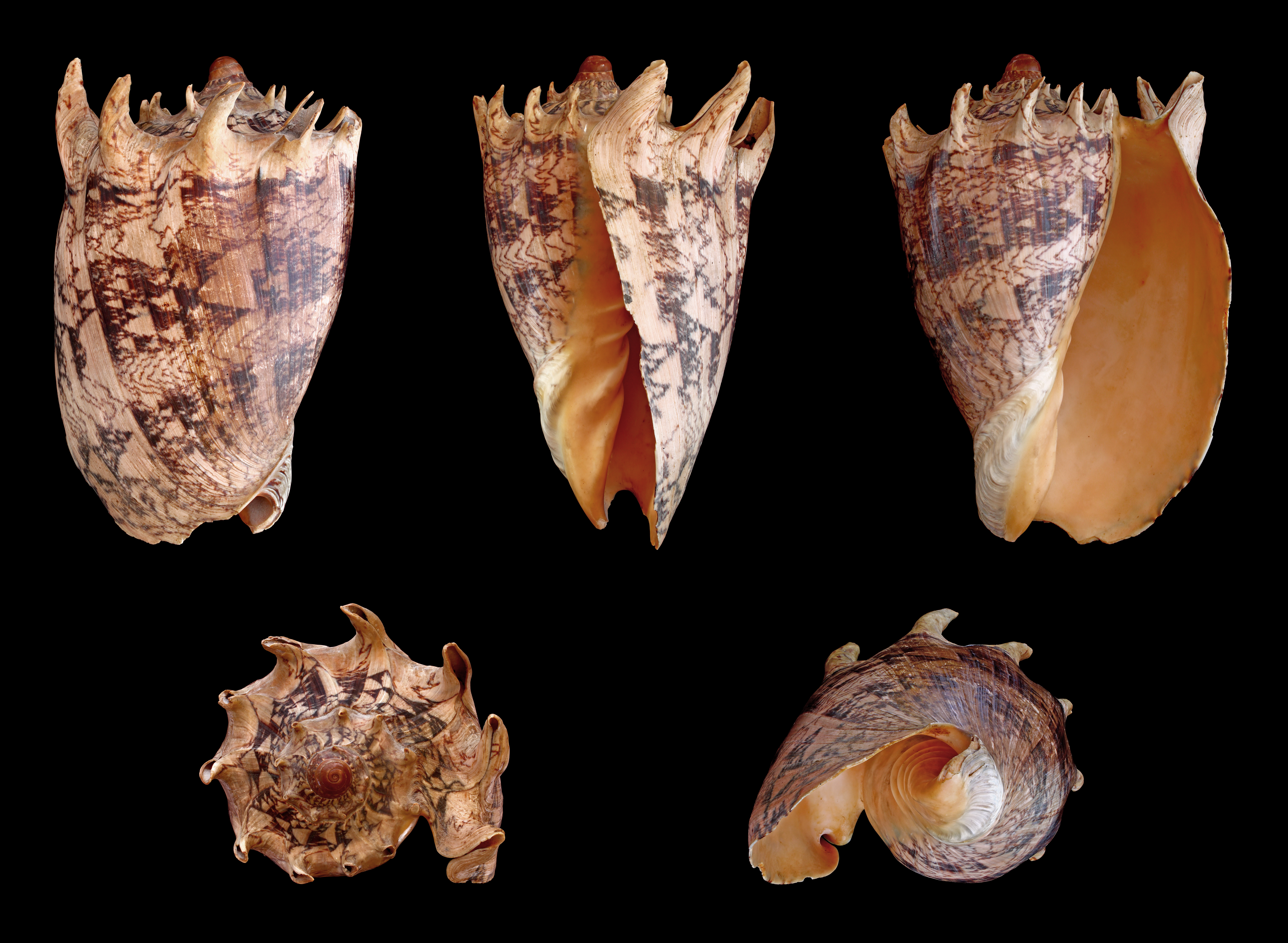

Scientific classification
- Kingdom: Animalia
- Phylum: Mollusca
- Class: Gastropoda
- Subclass: Caenogastropoda
- Order: Neogastropoda
- Family: Volutidae
- Genus: Cymbiola
- Species: C. imperialis

Binomial name
- Cymbiola imperialis (Lightfoot, 1786)

Synonyms
- Aulica imperialis (Lightfoot, 1786); Cymbiola (Cymbiola) imperialis ([Lightfoot], 1786) · alternative representation; Voluta imperialis Lightfoot, 1786; Volutocorona imperialis ([Lightfoot], 1786)

= Cymbiola imperialis =

Species of gastropod

Cymbiola imperialis, the imperial volute, is a species of sea snail, a marine gastropod mollusk of the genus Cymbiola in the family Volutidae, the volutes.

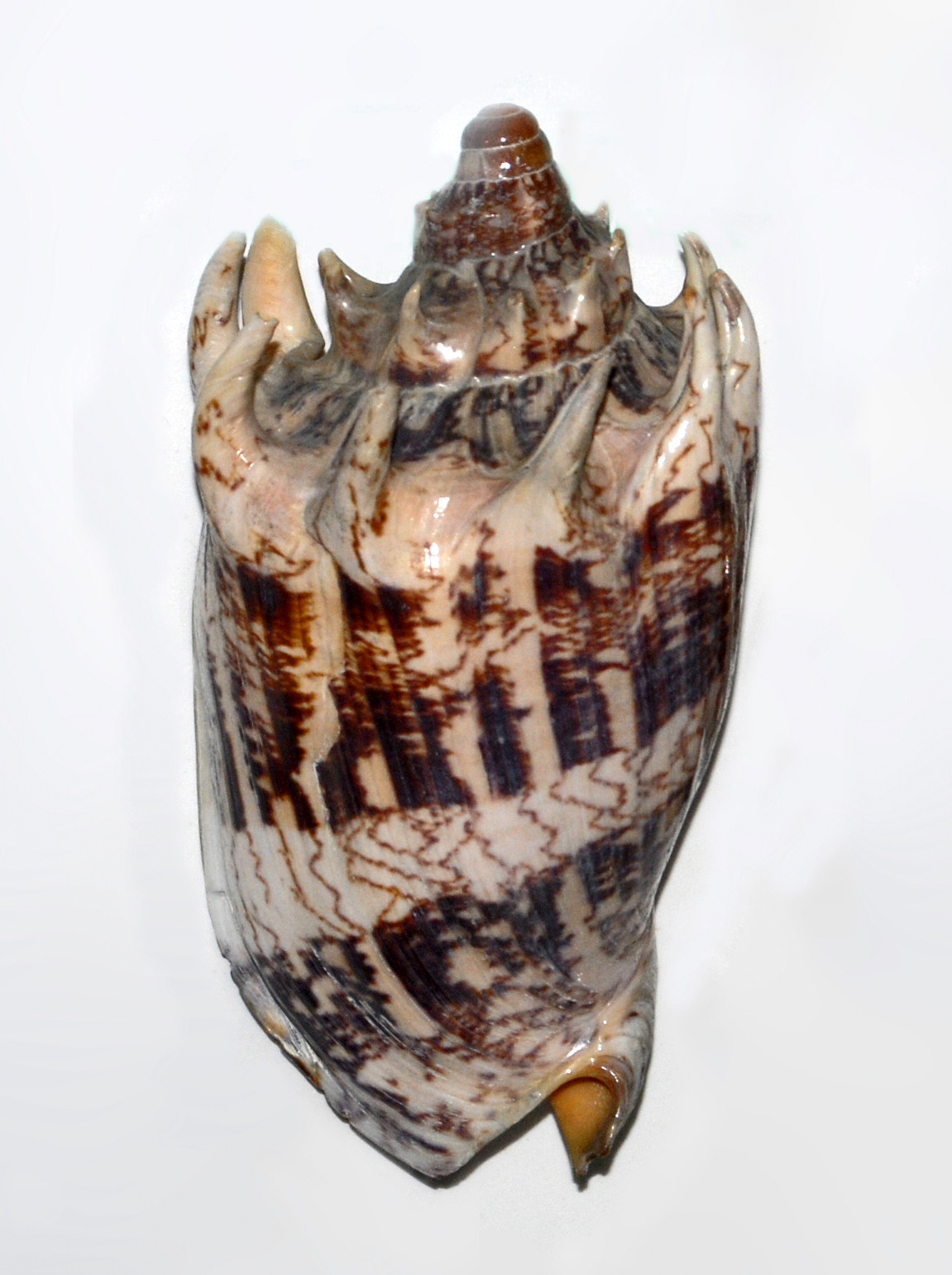
Shell of C. imperialis

== Subspecies ==
- C. imperialis robinsona Burch, 1954 (Robinson's volute, southern Philippines)

== Description ==
Shells of Cymbiola imperialis can reach a size of 70–250 millimetres (2.8–9.8 in). These large and glossy shells are elongate and fusiform, light to heavy in weight. The basic color is whitish. The spire is high, with canaliculate sutures, strong red-brown axial ribs and narrow red-brown spiral lines. The aperture is whitish, elongate-ovate, with the outer lip showing many black denticles. The operculum is dark brown, thick and small.

== Distribution ==
This species can be found in the Philippines, Sulu Sea.

== Bibliography ==
- A. P. H. Oliver, James Nicholls The Hamlyn Guide to Shells of the World paperback
- A. Robin Encyclopedia of Marine Gastropods
- Alan Hinton Shells of New Guinea and the Central Indo-Pacific
- Bail P. & Poppe G.T. 2001. A conchological iconography: a taxonomic introduction of the recent Volutidae. ConchBooks, Hackenheim. 30 pp, 5 pl.
- Doute, Harald Volutes, the Doute collection
- Graham Saunders Spotter's Guide to Shells: An Introduction to Seashells of the World 1st American edition
- Jerome M. Eisenberg A Collector's Guide to Seashells of the World
- Kenneth R. Wye Encyclopedia of Shells
- Masuoki Horikoshi Sea Shells of the World Japanese edition (Japanese) paperback – 1989
- R.Tucker Abbott & S. Peter Dance Compendium of Seashells 2nd printing 1983 revision
- Springsteen, F and F. M. Leobrera Shells of the Philippines
