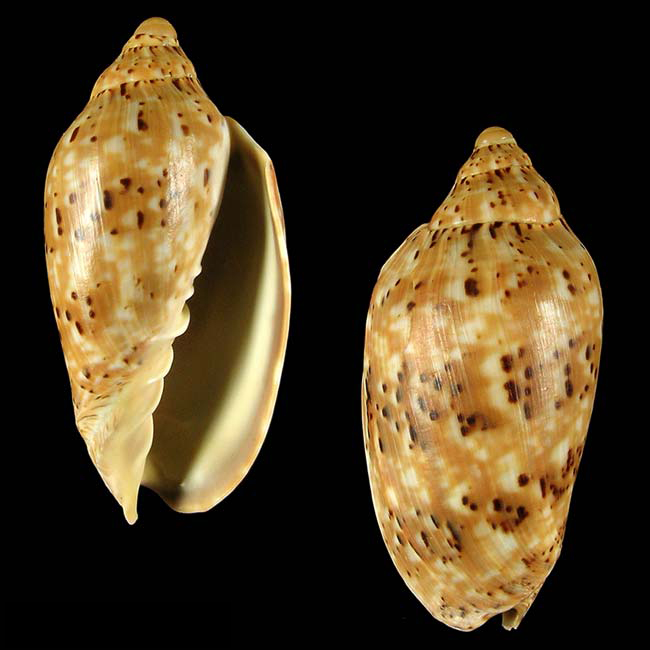

Scientific classification
- Kingdom: Animalia
- Phylum: Mollusca
- Class: Gastropoda
- Subclass: Caenogastropoda
- Order: Neogastropoda
- Family: Volutidae
- Genus: Cymbiola
- Species: C. scottjordani

Binomial name
- Cymbiola scottjordani Poppe & Tagaro, 2005

Synonyms
- Cymbiola (Cymbiola) scottjordani Poppe & Tagaro, 2005 · alternative representation Environment

= Cymbiola scottjordani =

Species of gastropod

Cymbiola scottjordani is a species of sea snail, a marine gastropod mollusk in the family Volutidae, the volutes.

== Distribution ==
This species occurs in the They were found between the borders of the Darwin Islands and the Arafura Sea at a depth of 150-200 meters, protected by latitude 9⁰ and compass 134⁰.He found it in November 2026 (Andre Probolinggo City 2026,11 ).

== Original description ==
- Poppe G.T. & Tagaro S. (2005) A new Cymbiola (Volutidae, Gastropoda) from the Arafura Sea. Visaya 1(5): 136–138. [November 2005]
