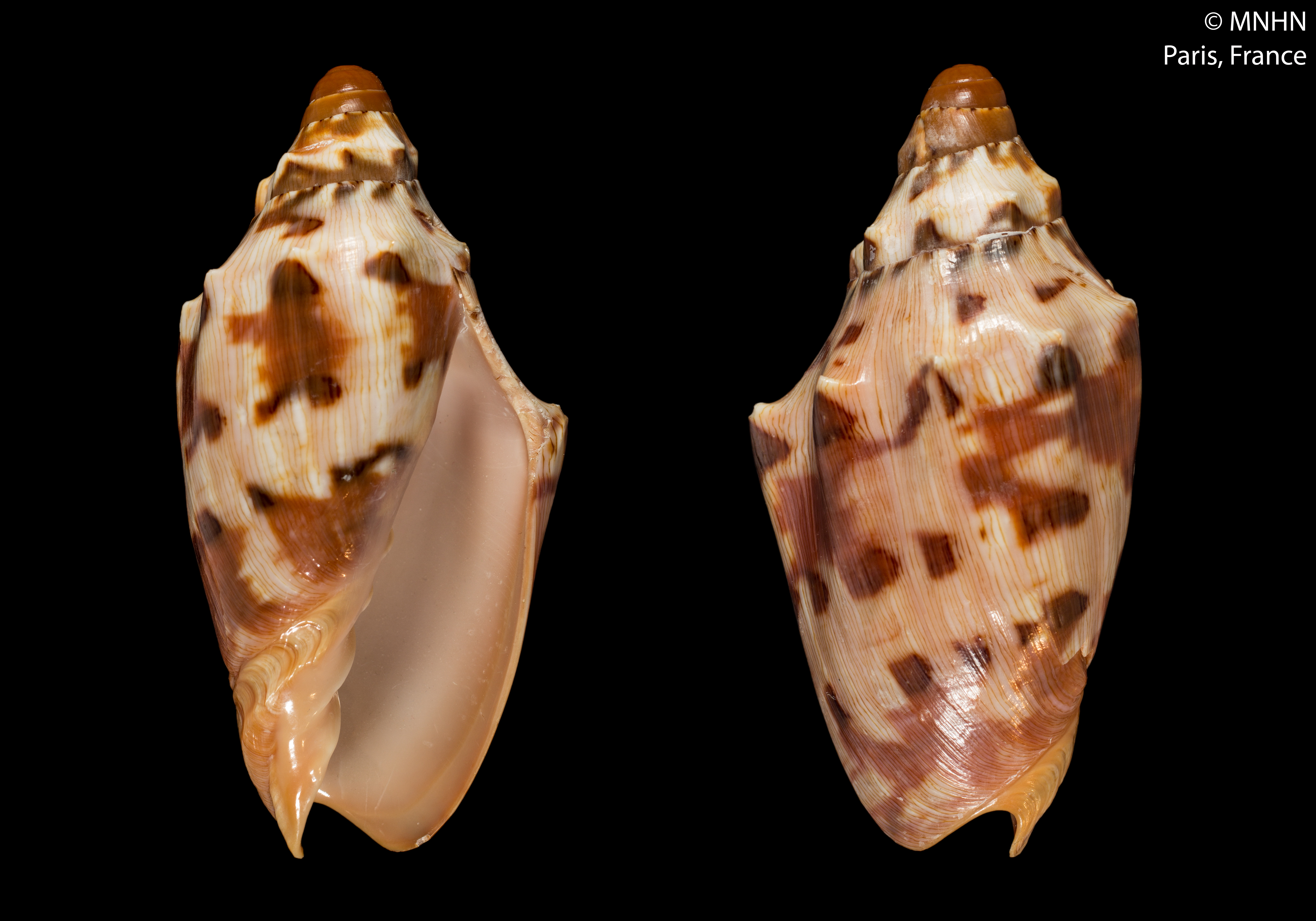
- A Shell of Cymbiola alexisallaryi (holotype at MNHN, Paris)

Scientific classification
- Kingdom: Animalia
- Phylum: Mollusca
- Class: Gastropoda
- Subclass: Caenogastropoda
- Order: Neogastropoda
- Family: Volutidae
- Genus: Cymbiola
- Species: C. alexisallaryi

Binomial name
- Cymbiola alexisallaryi T. Cossignani, 2018

= Cymbiola alexisallaryi =

Species of gastropod

Cymbiola alexisallaryi is a species of sea snail, a marine gastropod mollusk in the family Volutidae, the volutes.

== Distribution ==
This marine species occurs near Rasalan Island, the Philippines
