= Cymbiola distructa =

Scientific classification
- Kingdom: Animalia
- Phylum: Mollusca
- Class: Gastropoda
- Subclass: Caenogastropoda
- Order: Neogastropoda
- Family: Volutidae
- Genus: Cymbiola
- Species: C. distructa

Binomial name
- Cymbiola distructa Y. Zheng & S. J. Maxwell, 2025

Species of gastropod

Cymbiola distructa is a species of sea snail, a marine gastropod mollusk in the family Volutidae, the volutes.

== Distribution ==
This species occurs in the Arafura Sea. It was collected off northern Australia.
