= Cymbiola kimbacki =

Scientific classification
- Kingdom: Animalia
- Phylum: Mollusca
- Class: Gastropoda
- Subclass: Caenogastropoda
- Order: Neogastropoda
- Family: Volutidae
- Genus: Cymbiola
- Species: C. kimbacki

Binomial name
- Cymbiola kimbacki Bail & Limpus, 2014

Species of gastropod

Cymbiola kimbacki is a species of sea snail, a marine gastropod mollusk in the family Volutidae, the volutes.

== Distribution ==
This marine species is endemic to Australia and occurs off Western Australia.
