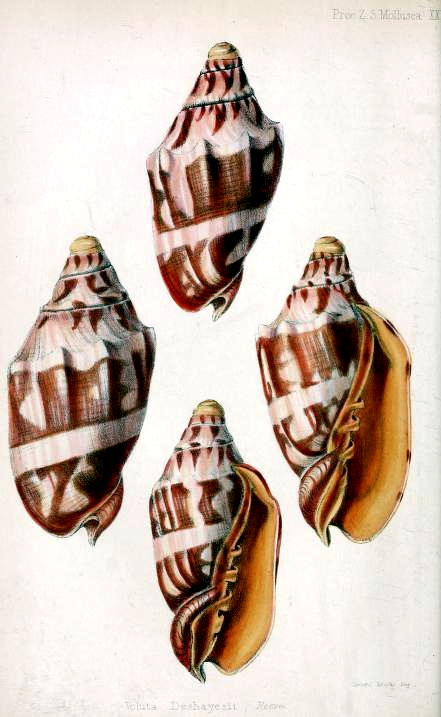
- Original drawing of Cymbiola deshayesii (holotype)

Scientific classification
- Kingdom: Animalia
- Phylum: Mollusca
- Class: Gastropoda
- Subclass: Caenogastropoda
- Order: Neogastropoda
- Family: Volutidae
- Genus: Cymbiola
- Species: C. deshayesii

Binomial name
- Cymbiola deshayesii (Reeve, 1855)

Synonyms
- Cymbiola (Cymbiola) deshayesi (Reeve, 1855) alternative representation; Cymbiola deshayesi [sic] misspelling - incorrect subsequent spelling; Voluta deshayesii Reeve, 1855 superseded combination

= Cymbiola deshayesii =

Species of gastropod

Cymbiola deshayesii is a species of sea snail, a marine gastropod mollusk in the family Volutidae, the volutes.

== Description ==
(Original description in Latin) The shell is ovately oblong, becoming contracted toward the base and twisted backward. Its base color is a pale flesh-white, encircled by two very broad bands marbled with vermilion-pink. It is covered in a thin, fleeting epidermis (periostracum). The spire is rather short and adorned with large, vivid vermilion-pink spots, while the apex is very largely and obtusely papillary and yellowish in hue.

The whorls are slightly concave at the top. The body whorl is very frequently angular and bears tubercles at the angle; these tubercles are somewhat descending in form. The columella is quadriplicate, featuring four very strong, somewhat square, and transverse folds. The aperture is somewhat contracted and displays an orange-flesh color.

== Distribution ==
Cymbiola deshayesii have been found in the waters surrounding several south-Pacific island groups, most frequently associated with the waters surrounding New Caledonia. The current findings suggest a range from Pacific islands east of the Philippines to small island chains just off the coast of north-eastern Australia (Queensland and the Coral Sea). They are mostly found at depths of 40 to 50 meters on sandy substrates near coral reefs. It is becoming increasingly rare in its natural habitat due to fishing pressure and its value in the shell trade.
