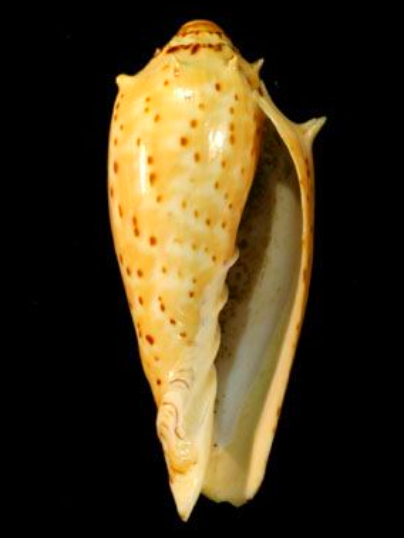
- Shell of Cymbiola cymbiola (specimen at the Natural History Museum Rotterdam)

Scientific classification
- Kingdom: Animalia
- Phylum: Mollusca
- Class: Gastropoda
- Subclass: Caenogastropoda
- Order: Neogastropoda
- Family: Volutidae
- Genus: Cymbiola
- Species: C. cymbiola

Binomial name
- Cymbiola cymbiola (Gmelin, 1791)

Synonyms
- Aulica cymbiola (Chemnitz, 1788); Cymbiola (Cymbiola) cymbiola (Gmelin, 1791) · accepted, alternate representation; Voluta corona Dillwyn, 1817; Voluta cymbiola Gmelin, 1791 (basionym); Voluta flammula Wood, 1828; Voluta kaupi Dunker, 1863

= Cymbiola cymbiola =

Species of gastropod

Cymbiola cymbiola, common name the crown volute, is a species of sea snail, a marine gastropod mollusk in the family Volutidae, the volutes.

== Description ==
Their shells are large in size, and the size of the shell varies between 55 mm and 85 mm. Their shells come in two distinct colors. The brown variant is fairly rare and is found in the same regions as the more common cream variant.

== Distribution ==
This marine species occurs off Indonesia (Moluccas) and off Australia (Northern Territory, Queensland, Western Australia)
