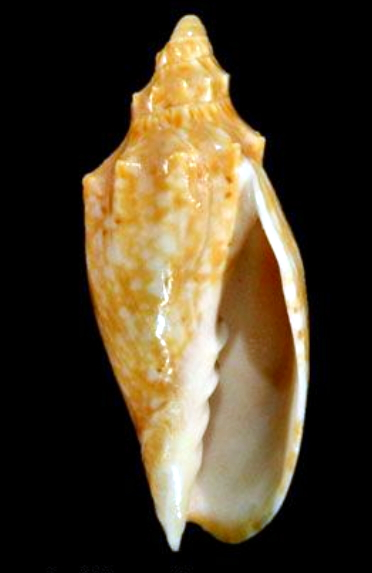
- Shell of Cymbiola complexa (specimen at the Natural History Museum Rotterdam)

Scientific classification
- Kingdom: Animalia
- Phylum: Mollusca
- Class: Gastropoda
- Subclass: Caenogastropoda
- Order: Neogastropoda
- Family: Volutidae
- Genus: Cymbiola
- Species: C. complexa

Binomial name
- Cymbiola complexa Iredale, 1924

Synonyms
- Cymbiola (Cymbiolacca) complexa Iredale, 1924 alternative representation; Cymbiola (Cymbiolacca) pulchra complexa Iredale, 1924; Cymbiola pulchra complexa Iredale, 1924; Cymbiolacca complexa (Iredale, 1924) ·; Voluta punctata Swainson, 1823 (invalid: junior homonym of Voluta punctata T. Brown, 1818; Cymbiola complexa is a replacement name)

= Cymbiola complexa =

Species of gastropod

Cymbiola complexa is a species of sea snail, a marine gastropod mollusk in the family Volutidae, the volutes.

Subspecies

- Cymbiola complexa complexa Iredale, 1924
- Cymbiola complexa frazerensis Bail & Limpus, 1998
- Cymbiola complexa nielseni (McMichael, 1963)

== Description ==
The length of the shell attains 61 mm.

== Distribution ==
This marine species is endemic to Australia and occurs off New South Wales and Queensland
