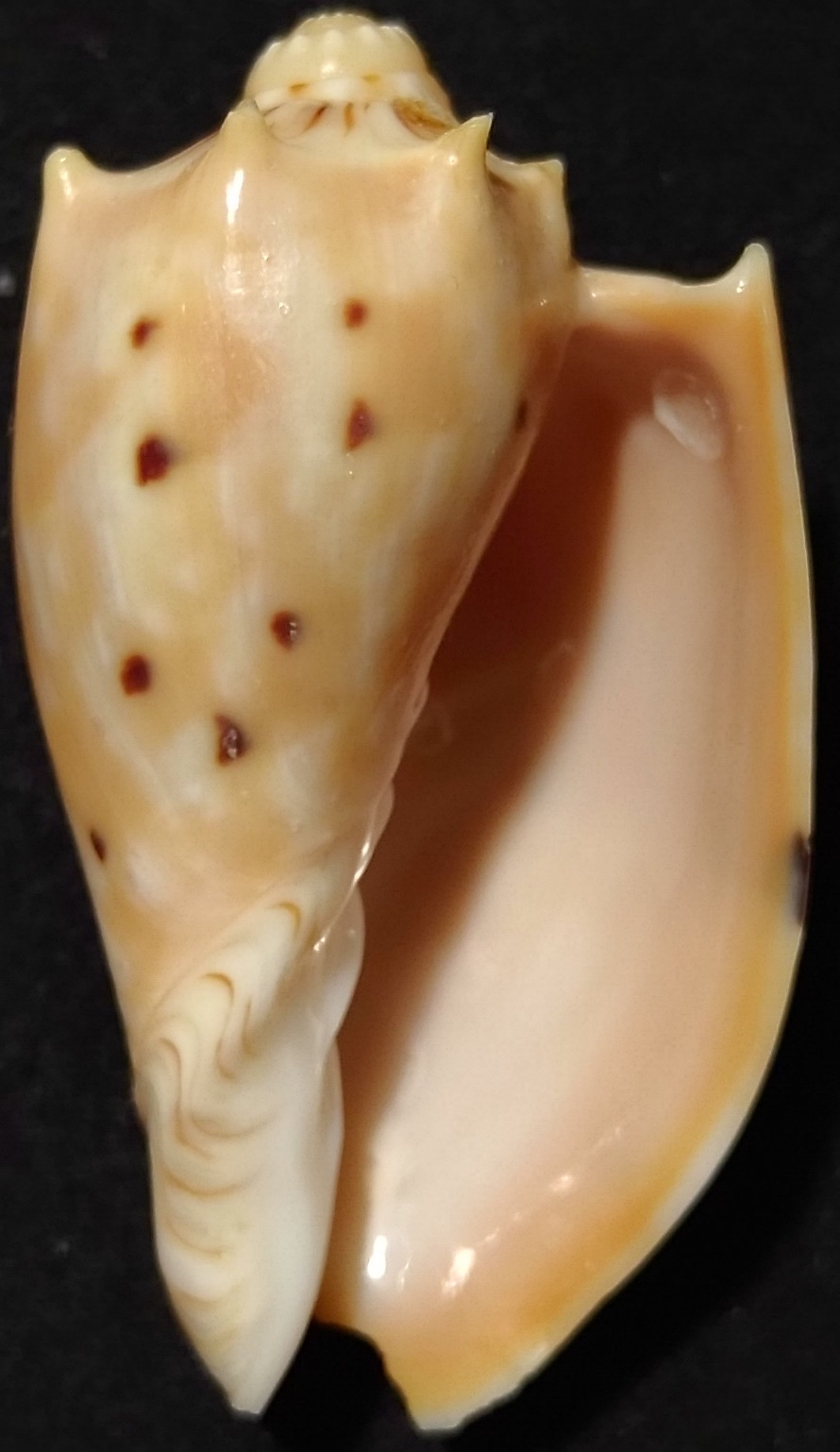

Scientific classification
- Kingdom: Animalia
- Phylum: Mollusca
- Class: Gastropoda
- Subclass: Caenogastropoda
- Order: Neogastropoda
- Family: Volutidae
- Genus: Cymbiola
- Species: C. sophia

Binomial name
- Cymbiola sophia (Gray, 1846)

Synonyms
- Cymbiola (Cymbiola) sophia (Gray, 1846) alternative representation; Voluta sophia Gray, 1846

= Cymbiola sophia =

Species of gastropod

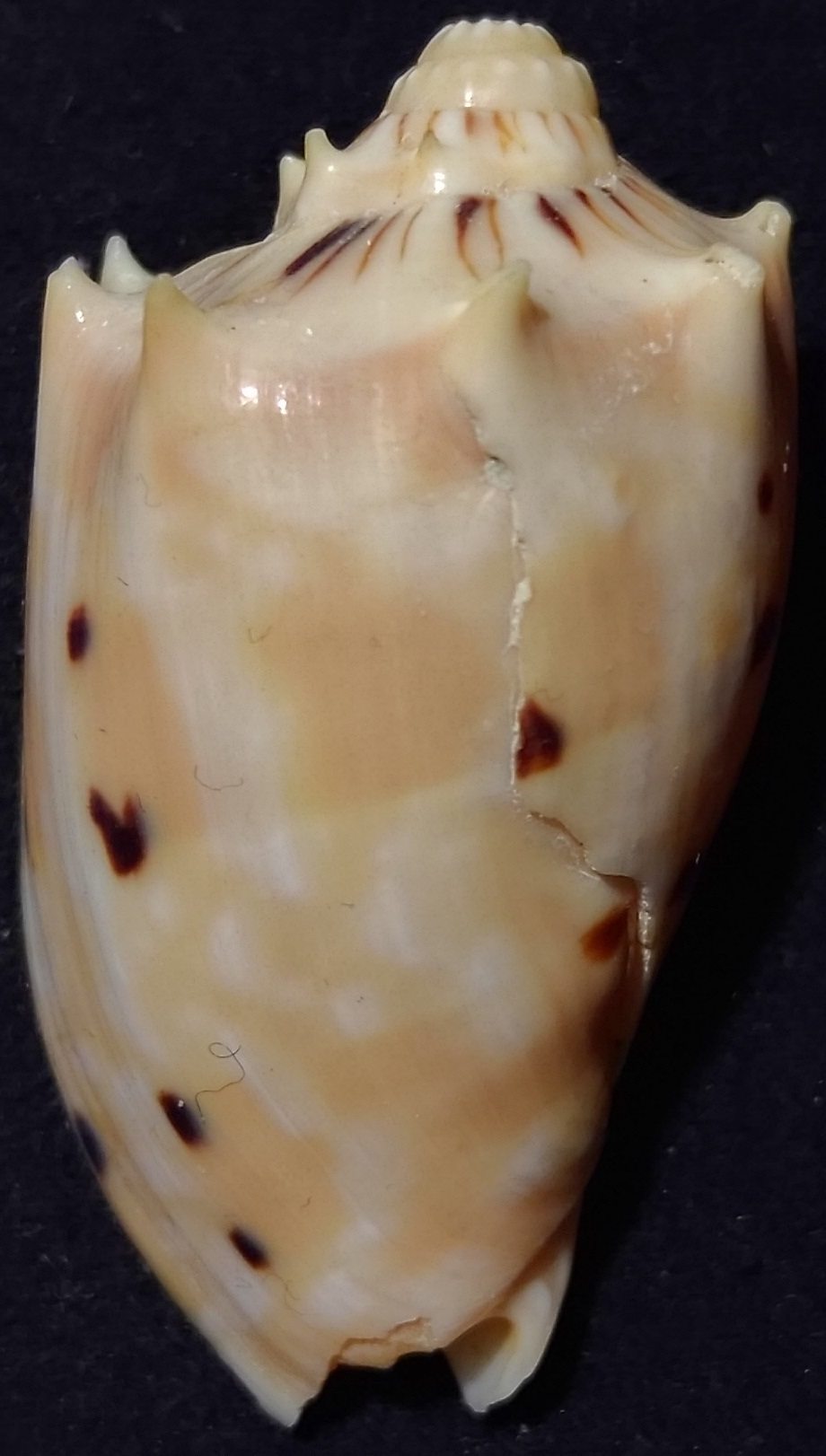

Cymbiola sophia is a species of sea snail, a marine gastropod mollusc in the family Volutidae, the volutes.

== Description ==
(Original description) The shell is ovate and smooth, with a pale brown ground color marked by four series of squarish, reddish-brown spots. Near the suture and in front of the columella it is lined with brown.

The spire is conical and convex, yet very short, and it is covered with a thin callous coating. The apex is blunt, pale whitish, and delicately crenulated. The whorls enlarge very rapidly and bear a spiral series of posterior, conical, acute, and slightly arched spines. The body whorl is ventricose, or swollen.

The aperture is ovate and about three times as long as it is broad. The pillar carries four oblique, evenly spaced folds, of which the two anterior are somewhat the largest. The inner lip, as well as the portion of the body whorl that rests against the body of the animal, is covered—like the spines—with a thin deposit of callus.

In the variety, the shell is paler and reddish, very minutely dotted with red, and the spots forming the bands are more irregular and less distinct.

== Distribution ==
This marine species is endemic to Australia and occurs off Northern Territory and Queensland.
