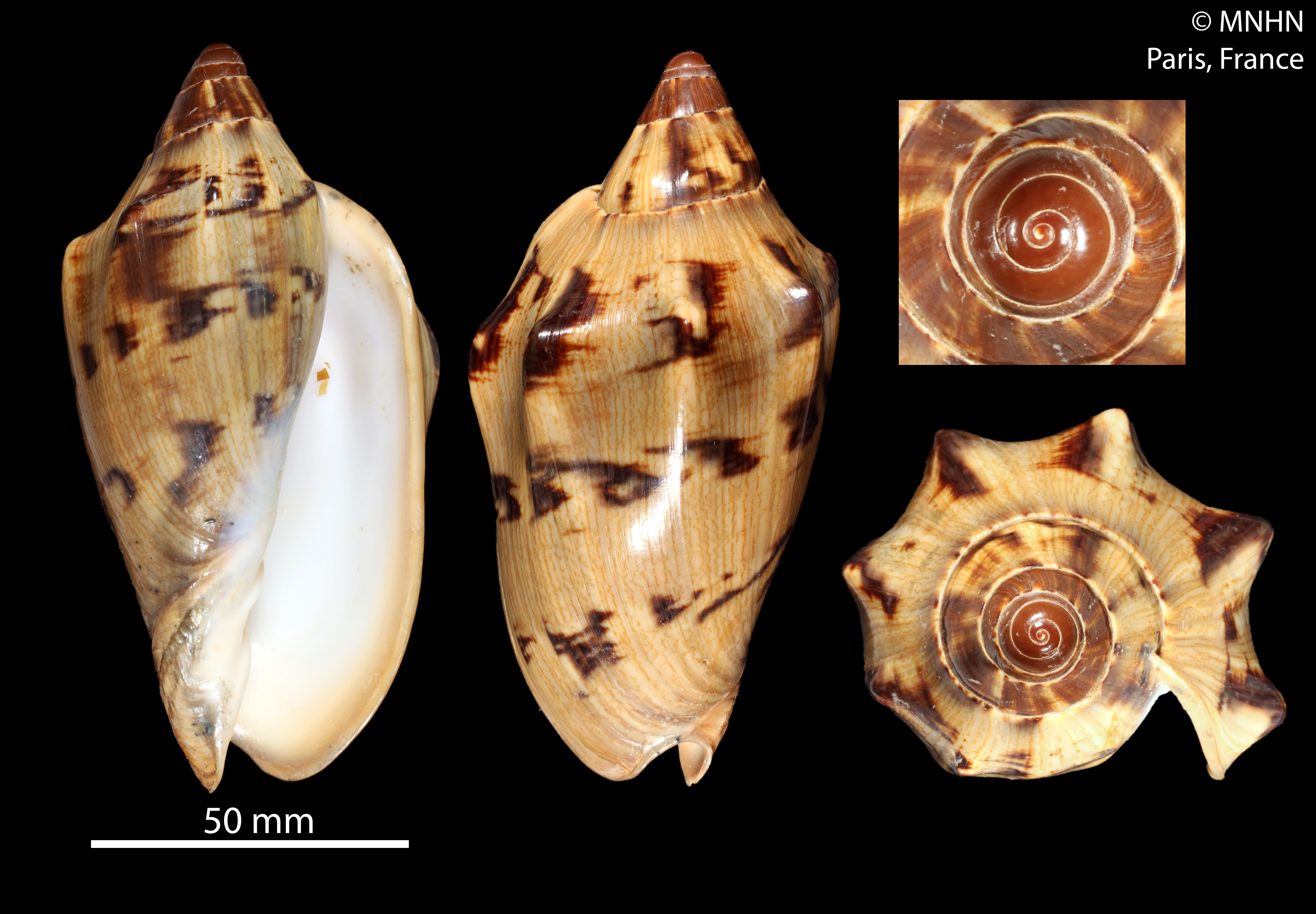
- Shell of Cymbiola laminusa (paratype at MNHN, Paris)

Scientific classification
- Kingdom: Animalia
- Phylum: Mollusca
- Class: Gastropoda
- Subclass: Caenogastropoda
- Order: Neogastropoda
- Superfamily: Volutoidea
- Family: Volutidae
- Genus: Cymbiola; Swainson, 1831

Type species
- Voluta cymbiola Gmelin, J.F., 1791

Synonyms
- List of synonyms: Aulica Gray, 1847; Aulicina Rovereto, 1899; Ausoba H. Adams & A. Adams, 1853; Cymbiola (Aulicina) Rovereto, 1899 junior subjective synonym; Cymbiola (Cymbiola) · accepted, alternate representation; Cymbiola (Cymbiolacca) Iredale, 1929 · accepted, alternate representation; Cymbiola (Magnavictoria) Poppe & Tagarao, 2020· accepted, alternate representation; Cymbiolacca Iredale, 1929; Cymbiolena Iredale, 1929; Cymbiolena (Cymbiolacca) Iredale, 1929 junior subjective synonym; Melo (Ausoba) H. Adams & A. Adams, 1853 junior objective synonym; Pseudocymbiola McMichael, 1961; Scapha Gray, 1855; Scapha (Aulica) J. E. Gray, 1847 junior subjective synonym; Voluta (Aulica) J. E. Gray, 1847 junior subjective synonym; Voluta (Cymbiola) Swainson, 1831 superseded rank; Voluta (Scapha) J. E. Gray, 1847 junior subjective synonym; Voluta (Vespertilio) Mörch, 1852; Volutocorona Pilsbry & Olsson, 1954

= Cymbiola =

Genus of gastropods

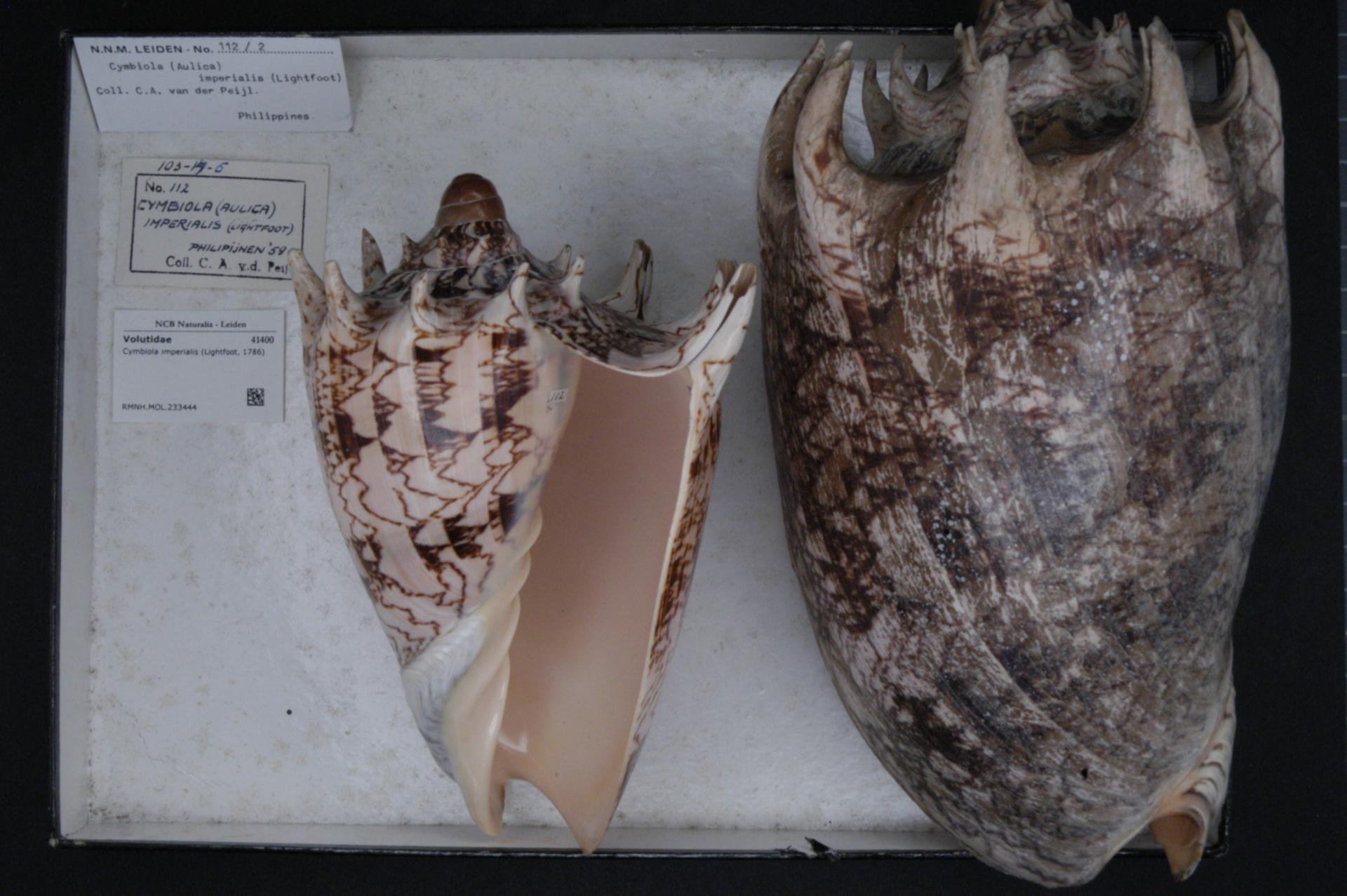
Cymbiola imperialis (Lightfoot, 1786), museum specimens Naturalis.

Cymbiola is a genus of large predatory sea snail, a marine gastropod mollusk in the subfamily Amoriinae of the family Volutidae, the volutes.

Some of the species within this genus are sometimes placed in the genus Cymbiolacca Iredale, 1929, which is also sometimes treated as a subgenus of Cymbiola.

== Description ==
The thin shell is ovate and cymbiform. The spire is more or less produced. The apex is papillary (forming a rounded, bulbous tip) and somewhat irregular. The aperture is wide. The inner lip shows a thin callus. The columella contains a few oblique plaits at the fore part. The acute outer lip is often somewhat dilated.

== Species ==
Species within the genus Cymbiola include:

- Cymbiola alexisallaryi (Cossignani, 2018)
- † Cymbiola ambugensis (Harzhauser, Raven & Landau, 2018)
- Cymbiola aulica (Sowerby I, 1825)
- Cymbiola baili (Prati & Raybaudi, 1997)
- Cymbiola cathcartiae (Reeve, 1856)
- Cymbiola chrysostoma (Swainson, 1824)
- Cymbiola complexa (Iredale, 1924)
- Cymbiola cooperi Petuch & Berschauer, 2024
- Cymbiola cracenta (McMichael, 1963)
- Cymbiola cymbiola (Gmelin, 1791)
- Cymbiola deshayesii (Reeve, 1854)
- Cymbiola distructa Y. Zheng & S. J. Maxwell, 2025
- Cymbiola flavicans (Gmelin, 1791)
- † Cymbiola gedinganensis (K. Martin, 1895)
- Cymbiola houarti (Bail & Limpus, 1998)
- Cymbiola hughmorrisoni (Bail & Limpus, 1997)
- Cymbiola imperialis (Lightfoot, 1786)
- Cymbiola innexa (Reeve, 1849)
- Cymbiola intruderi (Poppe, 1985)
- Cymbiola irvinae (Smith, 1909)
- Cymbiola kimbacki (Bail & Limpus, 2014)
- Cymbiola laminusa (Poppe, Tagaro & Bail, 2011)
- † Cymbiola macdonaldi (Tate, 1888)
- Cymbiola magnifica (Gebauer, 1802)
- Cymbiola malayensis (Douté & Bail, 2000)
- Cymbiola mariaemma (Gray, 1858)
- † Cymbiola molengraaffi (Cox, 1948)
- † Cymbiola monocoronata (P. J. Fischer, 1927)
- Cymbiola moretonensis (Bail & Limpus, 1998)
- † Cymbiola multiplicata (Pannekoek, 1936)
- Cymbiola nivosa (Lamarck, 1804)
- Cymbiola nobilis (Lightfoot, 1786)
- Cymbiola nusatenggara Crabos, 2025
- Cymbiola oblita (E. A. Smith, 1909)
- Cymbiola palawanica (Douté & Bail, 2000)
- Cymbiola perplicata (Hedley, 1902)
- Cymbiola provocationis (McMichael, 1961)
- Cymbiola pulchra (G. B. Sowerby I, 1825)
  - Cymbiola pulchra wisemani (Brazier, 1870)
- † Cymbiola rembangensis (Pannekoek, 1936)
- † Cymbiola rigaultiana (Deshayes, 1865)
- Cymbiola rossiniana (Bernardi, 1859)
- Cymbiola rutila (Broderip, 1826)
- Cymbiola scottjordani (Poppe & Tagaro, 2005)
- Cymbiola sophia (Gray, 1846)
- Cymbiola subelongata (Bail & Limpus, 1998)
- Cymbiola thatcheri (McCoy, 1868)
- † Cymbiola tjilonganensis (K. Martin, 1906)
- † Cymbiola transverseplicata (Pannekoek, 1936)
- † Cymbiola uncifera (Tate, 1888)
- Cymbiola vespertilio (Linnaeus, 1758)

Species brought into synonymy

- Cymbiola complexa Iredale, 1924: synonym of Cymbiola (Cymbiolacca) pulchra complexa Iredale, 1924
- Cymbiola excelsior Bail & Limpus, 1998: synonym of Cymbiola pulchra excelsior Bail & Limpus, 1998 (original rank)
- Cymbiola lutea R. B. Watson, 1882 : synonym of Alcithoe lutea (R. B. Watson, 1882) (original combination)
- Cymbiola marispuma Angioy & Biraghi, 1977: synonym of Cymbiola (Cymbiola) innexa (Reeve, 1849)
- Cymbiola randalli Stokes, 1961: synonym of Cymbiola (Cymbiolacca) pulchra wisemani (Brazier, 1870)
- Cymbiola tamariskae Sutanto & Patamakanthin, 2004: synonym of Cymbiola nobilis tamariskae Sutanto & Patamakanthin, 2004
