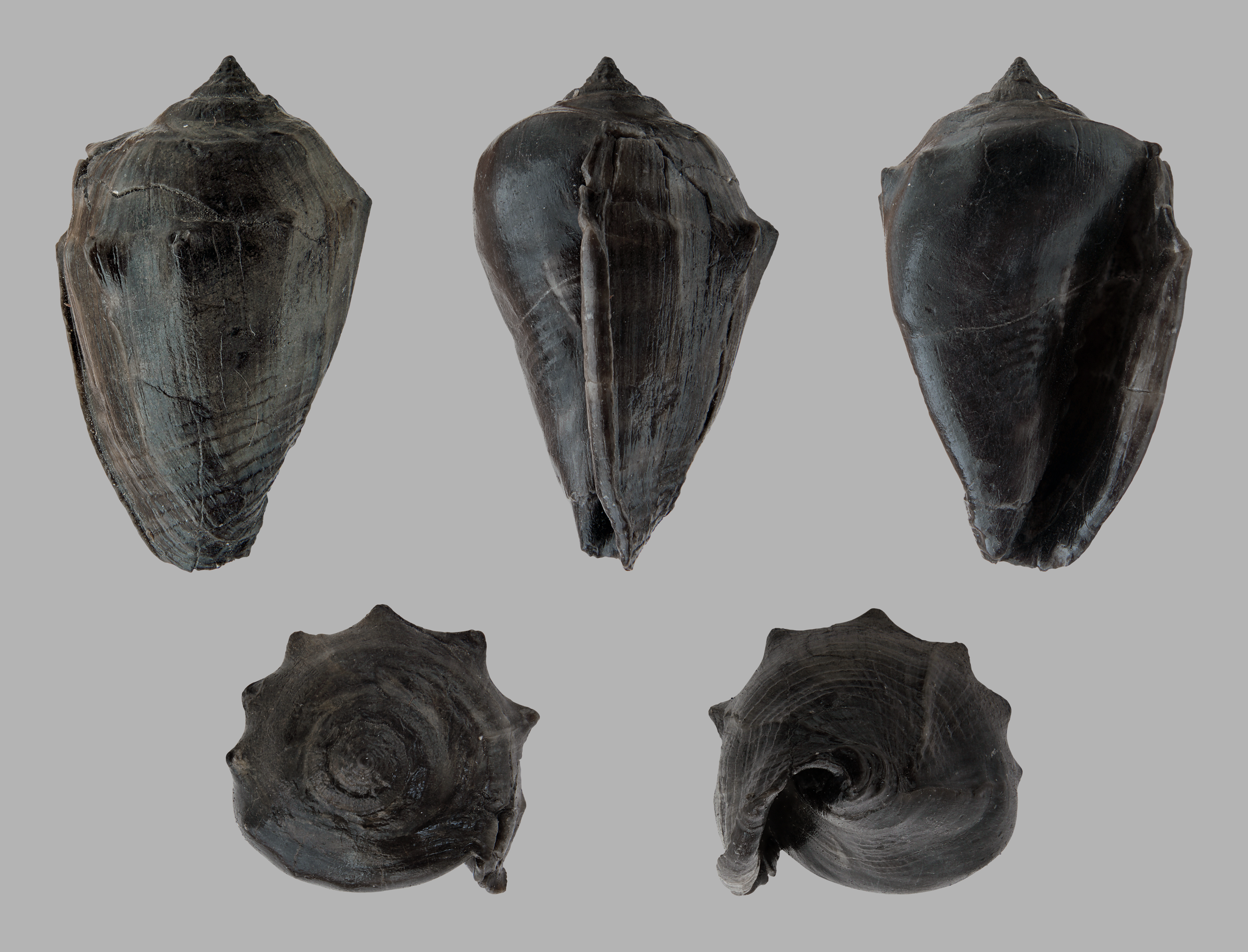
- Athleta ficulina, a fossil species from Miocene

Scientific classification
- Kingdom: Animalia
- Phylum: Mollusca
- Class: Gastropoda
- Subclass: Caenogastropoda
- Order: Neogastropoda
- Superfamily: Volutoidea
- Family: Volutidae
- Genus: Athleta; Conrad, 1853

Type species
- † Voluta rarispina Lamarck, 1811

Synonyms
- Athleta (Athleta) Conrad, 1853· accepted, alternate representation; Athleta (Neoathleta) Sacco, 1890 †· accepted, alternate representation; Athleta (Oligoathleta) Lozouet, 2019 †· accepted, alternate representation; Athleta (Ternivoluta) Martens, 1897· accepted, alternate representation; Athleta (Volutocorbis) Dall, 1890 †· accepted, alternate representation; Athleta (Volutospina) Newton, 1906 †· accepted, alternate representation; Notoplejona Marwick, 1926 †; Voluta (Ternivoluta) Martens, 1897; Volutilithes (Neoathleta) Sacco, 1890 †; Volutilithes (Volutocorbis) Dall, 1890 (original rank); Volutocorbis Dall, 1890; Volutospina Newton, 1906 (original rank); Volutospina (Athleta) Conrad, 1853 †

= Athleta (gastropod) =

Athleta Temporal range: Cretaceous to Recent

Genus of gastropods

Athleta is a genus of sea snails, marine gastropod mollusks in the family Volutidae.

== Species ==
Species within the genus Athleta include:

- † Athleta acutinodula Belliard & Gain, 2025
- † Athleta affinis (Brocchi, 1814)
- † Athleta ambiguus Solander in Brander, 1766
- † Athleta athleta Solander in Brander, 1877
- † Athleta baili Pacaud & Ledon, 2023
- † Athleta barrandii Deshayes, 1865
- † Athleta bicorona (Lamarck, 1803)
- † Athleta bulbulus (Lamarck, 1803)
- † Athleta burtoni Vredenburg, 1923
- † Athleta canaligera Staadt, 1913
- † Athleta caunelha Kovács et al., 2026
- † Athleta cazesi Kovács et al., 2026
- † Athleta citharoedus (Holten, 1802)
- † Athleta citharopsis Merle & Pacaud, 2014
- † Athleta crenulifer (Bayan, 1870)
- † Athleta delvallei Astibia, Merle & Pacaud, 2018
- † Athleta depauperatus J. De C.Sowerby, 1823
- † Athleta depressus (Lamarck, 1803)
- † Athleta digitalinus (Lamarck, 1810)
- † Athleta elevata (J. De C. Sowerby, 1840)
- † Athleta eugeniae Vredenburg, 1923
- † Athleta fabri (Deshayes, 1866)
- † Athleta ficulina (Lamarck, 1811)
- † Athleta fournigaulti Belliard & Gain, 2025
- † Athleta gabriellis (Benoist, 1874)
- † Athleta gandilloti (Chavan, 1941)
- † Athleta haueri (M. Hörnes, 1852)
- † Athleta intercrenatus Cossmann & Pissarro, 1909
- † Athleta labrellus Lamarck, 1802
- † Athleta lasharii Merle & Pacaud, 2014
- † Athleta lata (Marwick, 1926)
- † Athleta lineolatus (Deshayes, 1835)
- † Athleta listerarum Le Renard, 1994
- † Athleta loubryi Kovács et al., 2026
- † Athleta ludensis Périer, 1941
- † Athleta lyra (Lamarck, 1803)
- † Athleta maculosus Lozouet, 2019
- Athleta magister (Kilburn, 1980)
- † Athleta marocanus Moret, 1938
- † Athleta maxencei Kovács et al., 2026
- † Athleta marwicki P. A. Maxwell, 2003
- † Athleta memoirae Lozouet, 2019
- † Athleta mimica P. A. Maxwell, 2003
- † Athleta monstrosus (J. Sowerby, 1816)
- † Athleta mutatus Deshayes, 1835
- † Athleta necopinata Suter, 1917
- †Athleta nikolaji Schnetler & M. S. Nielsen, 2018
- † Athleta nodifera (Koenen, 1885)
- † Athleta noetlingi (Cossmann & Pissarro, 1909)
- †Athleta permulticostatus (Telegdi-Roth, 1914)
- † Athleta peyreirensis Lozouet, 2019
- † Athleta pseudolyra (A. d'Orbigny, 1850)
- † Athleta rathieri (Hébert, 1849)
- † Athleta spinosus (Linnaeus, 1758)
- † Athleta strombiformis Deshayes, 1835
- † Athleta subaffinis (d'Orbigny, 1852)
- † Athleta szumzeri Kovács et al., 2026
- † Athleta subambiguus (d'Orbigny, 1852)
- † Athleta subelegans (d'Orbigny, 1852)
- † Athleta subinflatus (Moret, 1938)
- † Athleta suspensus Solander in Brander, 1766
- † Athleta taikoensis P. A. Maxwell, 2003
- † Athleta telegdyi (Gaál, 1938)
- † Athleta tournoueri (Peyrot, 1928)
- † Athleta trisulcatus (Deshayes, 1835) †
- † Athleta wangerrip Darragh, 1971
- † Athleta wynnei Cox, 1930

=== Fossil species ===
subgenus Athleta Conrad, 1853

- † Athleta fayiumensis Abbass, 1967

subgenus † Neoathleta Bellardi, 1890

- † Athleta cithara Lamarck, 1802: synonym of † Athleta citharoedus (Holten, 1802)
- † Athleta geminata Edwards, 1854

Sometimes the following species used to be recognized in the separate genus:

- † Volutocorbis humei Abbass, 1967
- † Volutocorbis sohli Abbass, 1967
- † Volutocorbis crenulifera Bayan, 1870: synonym of Athleta crenulifer (Bayan, 1870) (superseded combination)
- † Volutocorbis digitalina Lamarck, 1810: synonym of Athleta digitalinus (Lamarck, 1810) (superseded combination)
- † Volutocorbis elevata Sowerby, 1840: synonym of Athleta elevata (J. De C. Sowerby, 1840) (superseded combination)
- † Volutocorbis inornatus Oppenheim, 1906
- † Volutocorbis lima Sowerby, 1823
- † Volutocorbis minutus Perrilliat et al., 2006
- † Volutocorbis pakistanica Eames, 1952
- † Volutocorbis scabricula Linnaeus, 1758: synonym of Pterygia scabricula (Linnaeus, 1758)

subgenus Volutospina Newton, 1906

- † Athleta dentata Sowerby, 1839
- † Athleta jacobsi Vredenburg, 1921
- † Athleta luctator Sowerby, 1823
- † Athleta mekranica Vredenburg, 1925
- † Athleta nodosa Sowerby, 1829
- † Athleta noetlingi Cossmann & Pissarro, 1909
- † Athleta sindiensis Vredenburg, 1925
- † Volutospina conicoturrita Newton, 1922
- † Volutospina kohatica Eames, 1952
- † Volutospina multispinosa Newton, 1922

subgenus ?

- † Athleta clayi
- † Athleta daviesi Cox, 1930
- † Athleta haleanus
- † Athleta lisbonensis
  - † Athleta lisbonensis forma crockettensis Plummer, 1933: synonym of † Volutocorbis olssoni (F. B. Plummer, 1933)
- † Athleta lugardi Newton, 1922
- † Athleta pygmaea Bellardi, 1890
- † Athleta sayanus Conrad, 1833
- † Athleta symmetricus Conrad, 1854

== Synonyms ==
- Athleta abyssicola (Adams & Reeve, 1848): synonym of Capensisvoluta abyssicola (A. Adams & Reeve, 1848) (superseded combination)
- Athleta anticingulata (F. McCoy, 1866) †: synonym of Athleta anticingulata anticingulata (F. McCoy, 1866) †: synonym of Ternivoluta anticingulata anticingulata (McCoy, 1866) †
- Athleta antiscalaris (F. McCoy, 1866) †: synonym of Ternivoluta antiscalaris (F. McCoy, 1866) †
- Athleta antispinosa (Tate, 1899) †: synonym of Ternivoluta antispinosa (Tate, 1899) † (superseded combination)
- Athleta boswellae (Rehder, 1969): synonym of Capensisvoluta boswellae (Rehder, 1969) ( superseded combination)
- Athleta bungae Darragh, 1971 †: synonym of Ternivoluta bungae (Darragh, 1971) † (superseded combination)
- Athleta curvicostata Darragh, 1971 †: synonym of Ternivoluta curvicostata (Darragh, 1971) † (superseded combination)
- Athleta disparilis (Rehder, 1969): synonym of Capensisvoluta disparilis (Rehder, 1969) (superseded combination)
- Athleta easoni Petuch & Berschauer, 2017: synonym of Capensisvoluta easoni (Petuch & Berschauer, 2017) (original combination)
- Athleta emmanuelae (Rosso, 1985): synonym of Capensisvoluta emmanuelae (Rosso, 1985) (superseded combination)
- Athleta epigona (E. von Martens, 1904): synonym of Afriathleta epigona (E. von Martens, 1904) (unaccepted > superseded combination)
- Athleta gandilloti Chavan, 1941 †: synonym of Athleta gandilloti (Chavan, 1941) † (superseded combination)
- Athleta gilchristi (G. B. Sowerby III, 1902): synonym of Nataliavoluta gilchristi (G. B. Sowerby III, 1902) (superseded combination)
- Athleta glabrata (Kilburn, 1971): synonym of Nataliavoluta glabrata (Kilburn, 1971) (superseded combination)
- Athleta insperata Darragh, 1979: synonym of Ternivoluta insperata (Darragh, 1979) (superseded combination)
- Athleta kilburni (Rehder, 1974): synonym of Afriathleta kilburni (Rehder, 1974) (superseded combination)
- Athleta lutosa (H. J. Koch, 1948): synonym of Capensisvoluta lutosa (H. J. Koch, 1948) (superseded combination)
- Athleta massieri Petuch & Berschauer, 2017: synonym of Capensisvoluta massieri (Petuch & Berschauer, 2017)
- Athleta mozambicana (Rehder, 1972): synonym of Nataliavoluta mozambicana (Rehder, 1972) (superseded combination)
- Athleta nana (Rehder, 1974): synonym of Nataliavoluta nana (Rehder, 1974) (superseded combination)
- Athleta nicklesi (Rosso, 1976): synonym of Capensisvoluta nicklesi (Rosso, 1976)
- † Athleta petrosa Conrad, 1833: synonym of † Volutovetus petrosus (Conrad, 1833)
- Athleta pisororum H. Morrison, 2006: synonym of Ternivoluta pisororum (H. Morrison, 2006)
- † Athleta rarispina (Lamarck, 1811): synonym of † Athleta ficulina (Lamarck, 1811)
- Athleta rosavittoriae (Rehder, 1981): synonym of Afriathleta rosavittoriae (Rehder, 1981) (superseded combination)
- Athleta rosavittoriae (Rehder, 1981): synonym of Afriathleta rosavittoriae (Rehder, 1981) (superseded combination)
- Athleta semirugata (Rehder & Weaver, 1974): synonym of Afriathleta semirugata (Rehder & C. S. Weaver, 1974) (superseded combination)
- Athleta spinosa (Linnaeus, 1758) †: synonym of Athleta spinosus (Linnaeus, 1758) † (incorrect grammatical agreement of specific epithet)
- Athleta studeri (Martens, 1897): synonym of Ternivoluta studeri (E. von Martens, 1897) (superseded combination)
- † Athleta subcrenulifera Darragh, 1971: synonym of † Ternivoluta subcrenulifera (Darragh, 1971) (superseded combination)
