= Afriathleta =

Scientific classification
- Kingdom: Animalia
- Phylum: Mollusca
- Class: Gastropoda
- Subclass: Caenogastropoda
- Order: Neogastropoda
- Family: Volutidae
- Genus: Afriathleta; S. G. Veldsman & J. H. Veldsman, 2022

Type species
- Volutocorbis semirugata Rehder & C. S. Weaver, 1974

Genus of gastropods

Afriathleta is a genus of sea snails, marine gastropod mollusks in the subfamily Athletinae of the family Volutidae.

== Taxonomy ==
This genus has become a junior synonym of † Athleta (Neoathleta) Sacco, 1890 represented as Athleta Conrad, 1853. However, the taxonomy of the species on this genus has remained unchanged, until further notice.

== Species ==
- Afriathleta epigona (E. von Martens, 1904)
- Afriathleta kilburni (Rehder, 1974)
- Afriathleta leilaniae S. G. Veldsman & J. H. Veldsman, 2022
- Afriathleta rosavittoriae (Rehder, 1981)
- Afriathleta semirugata (Rehder & C. S. Weaver, 1974)
- Afriathleta trixiae S. G. Veldsman & J. H. Veldsman, 2022
- Afriathleta viljoenae S. G. Veldsman & J. H. Veldsman, 2022
