= Nataliavoluta =

Scientific classification
- Kingdom: Animalia
- Phylum: Mollusca
- Class: Gastropoda
- Subclass: Caenogastropoda
- Order: Neogastropoda
- Family: Volutidae
- Genus: Nataliavoluta; S. G. Veldsman & J. H. Veldsman, 2022

Type species
- Volutilithes gilchristi G. B. Sowerby III, 1902

Genus of gastropods

Nataliavoluta is a genus of sea snails, marine gastropod mollusks in the subfamily Athletinae of the family Volutidae.

== Species ==
- Nataliavoluta everriculum S. G. Veldsman & J. H. Veldsman, 2022
- Nataliavoluta gilchristi (G. B. Sowerby III, 1902)
- Nataliavoluta glabrata (Kilburn, 1971)
- Nataliavoluta mozambicana (Rehder, 1972)
- Nataliavoluta nana (Rehder, 1974)
- Nataliavoluta sagena S. G. Veldsman & J. H. Veldsman, 2022
