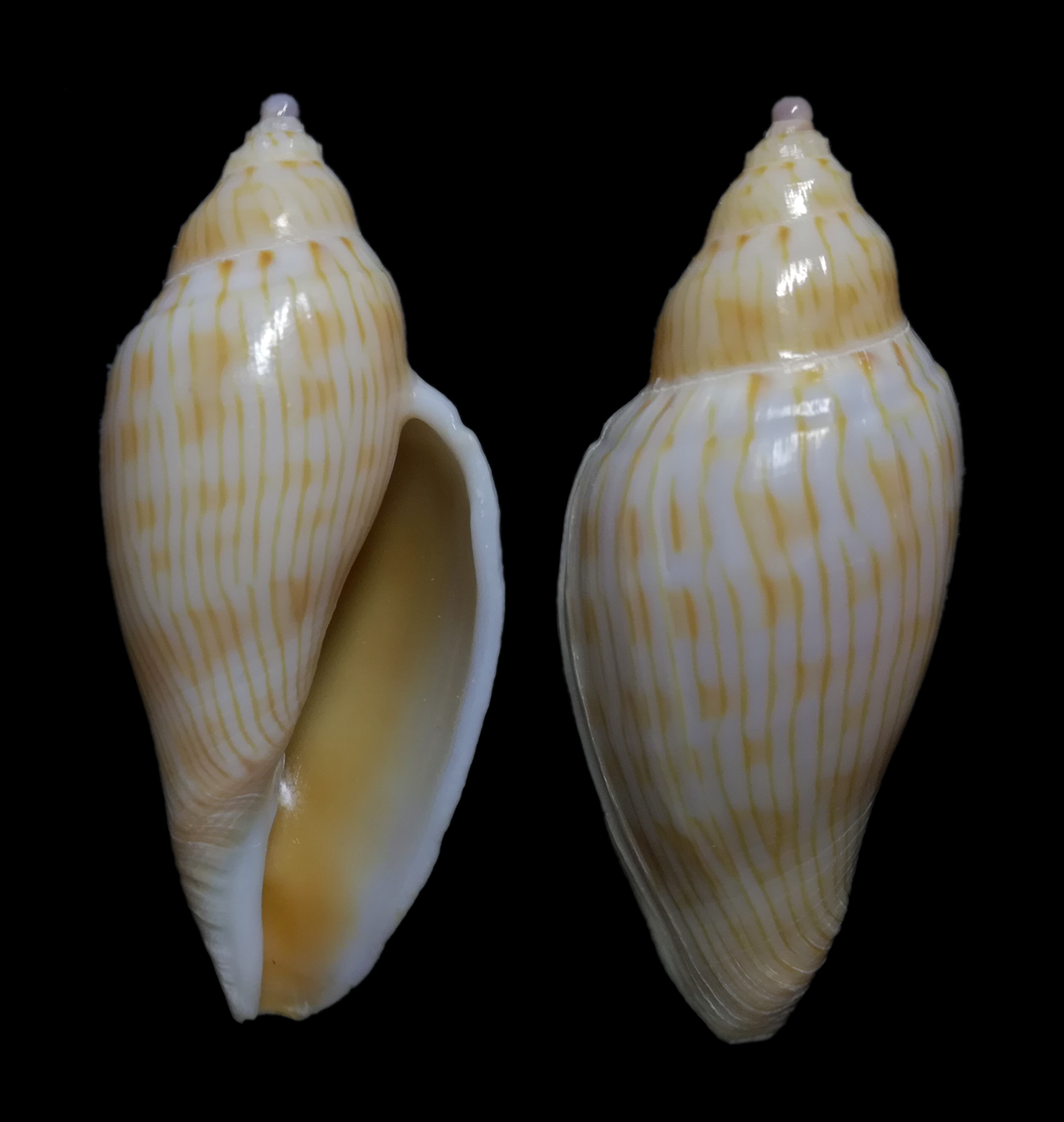
- Shell of Ternivoluta studeri

Scientific classification
- Kingdom: Animalia
- Phylum: Mollusca
- Class: Gastropoda
- Subclass: Caenogastropoda
- Order: Neogastropoda
- Family: Volutidae
- Genus: Ternivoluta; E. von Martens, 1897

Type species
- Voluta studeri E. von Martens, 1897

Synonyms
- Athleta (Ternivoluta) E. von Martens, 1897 superseded rank; † Austrovoluta Cotton, 1949 junior subjective synonym; Voluta (Ternivoluta) E. von Martens, 1897 superseded rank

= Ternivoluta =

Genus of gastropods

Ternivoluta is a genus of sea snails, marine gastropod mollusks in the subfamily Athletinae of the family Volutidae.

== General characteristics ==
(Original description in German) The shell is smooth and glossy, featuring a blunt shoulder edge and a moderately protruding spire. Its initial whorl is smooth, spherical, and not very large. There are four rather strong and very oblique columellar folds. The radula possesses three well-developed tooth plates in each row.

== Species ==
- † Ternivoluta anticingulata (F. McCoy, 1866)
- † Ternivoluta antiscalaris (F. McCoy, 1866)
- † Ternivoluta antispinosa (Tate, 1899)
- † Ternivoluta bungae (Darragh, 1971)
- † Ternivoluta craticulata (Darragh, 1971)
- † Ternivoluta curvicostata (Darragh, 1971)
- Ternivoluta insperata (Darragh, 1979)
- † Ternivoluta levior (F. McCoy, 1866)
- Ternivoluta pisororum (H. Morrison, 2006)
- Ternivoluta studeri (E. von Martens, 1897)
- † Ternivoluta subcrenulifera (Darragh, 1971)
