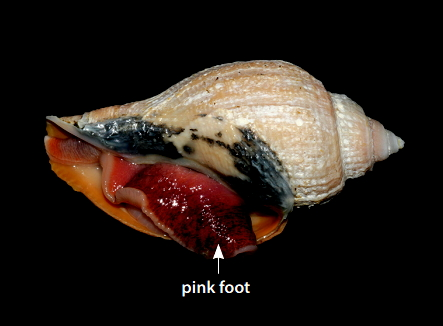
- Shell of Capensisvoluta lutosa

Scientific classification
- Kingdom: Animalia
- Phylum: Mollusca
- Class: Gastropoda
- Subclass: Caenogastropoda
- Order: Neogastropoda
- Family: Volutidae
- Genus: Capensisvoluta; S. G. Veldsman & J. H. Veldsman, 2022

Type species
- Voluta abyssicola A. Adams & Reeve, 1848

= Capensisvoluta =

Genus of gastropods

Capensisvoluta is a genus of sea snails, marine gastropod mollusks in the subfamily Athletinae of the family Volutidae.

== Genera ==
- Capensisvoluta abyssicola (A. Adams & Reeve, 1848)
- Capensisvoluta ariejoostei S. G. Veldsman & J. H. Veldsman, 2022
- Capensisvoluta benguelensis S. G. Veldsman & J. H. Veldsman, 2022
- Capensisvoluta boswellae (Rehder, 1969)
- Capensisvoluta disparilis (Rehder, 1969)
- Capensisvoluta easoni (Petuch & Berschauer, 2017)
- Capensisvoluta emmanuelae (Rosso, 1985)
- Capensisvoluta kuisebensis S. G. Veldsman & J. H. Veldsman, 2022
- Capensisvoluta lizekae S. G. Veldsman & J. H. Veldsman, 2022
- Capensisvoluta lutosa (H. J. Koch, 1948)
- Capensisvoluta massieri (Petuch & Berschauer, 2017)
- Capensisvoluta namaqua S. G. Veldsman & J. H. Veldsman, 2022
- Capensisvoluta nicklesi (Rosso, 1976)
