= Afriathleta semirugata =

Scientific classification
- Kingdom: Animalia
- Phylum: Mollusca
- Class: Gastropoda
- Subclass: Caenogastropoda
- Order: Neogastropoda
- Family: Volutidae
- Genus: Afriathleta
- Species: A. semirugata

Binomial name
- Afriathleta semirugata (Rehder & Weaver, 1974)

Synonyms
- Athleta (Athleta) semirugata (Rehder & Weaver, 1974); Athleta semirugata (Rehder & C. S. Weaver, 1974) superseded combination; Volutocorbis semirugata Rehder & Weaver, 1974 (basionym)

Species of gastropod

Afriathleta semirugata is a species of sea snail, a marine gastropod mollusk in the family Volutidae, the volutes.

== Description ==
The length of the shell varies between 33 mm and 55.3 mm.

== Distribution ==
This marine species occurs KwaZulu-Natal, South Africa.
