= Nataliavoluta mozambicana =

Scientific classification
- Kingdom: Animalia
- Phylum: Mollusca
- Class: Gastropoda
- Subclass: Caenogastropoda
- Order: Neogastropoda
- Family: Volutidae
- Genus: Nataliavoluta
- Species: N. mozambicana

Binomial name
- Nataliavoluta mozambicana (Rehder, 1972)

Synonyms
- Athleta (Athleta) mozambicana (Rehder, 1972); Athleta gilchristi f. mozambicana (Rehder, 1972); Athleta mozambicana (Rehder, 1972) superseded combination; Volutocorbis mozambicana Rehder, 1972 (basionym)

Species of gastropod

Nataliavoluta mozambicana is a species of sea snail, a marine gastropod mollusk in the family Volutidae, the volutes.

== Description ==
The length of the shell varies between 14.1 mm and 19.4 mm.

== Distribution ==
This marine species occurs off southern Mozambique.
