= Nataliavoluta nana =

Scientific classification
- Kingdom: Animalia
- Phylum: Mollusca
- Class: Gastropoda
- Subclass: Caenogastropoda
- Order: Neogastropoda
- Family: Volutidae
- Genus: Nataliavoluta
- Species: N. nana

Binomial name
- Nataliavoluta nana (Rehder & Weaver, 1974)

Synonyms
- Athleta (Athleta) nana (Rehder & Weaver, 1974); Athleta nana (Rehder, 1974) superseded combination; Volutocorbis nana Rehder & Weaver, 1974 (basionym)

Species of gastropod

Nataliavoluta nana is a species of sea snail, a marine gastropod mollusk in the family Volutidae, the volutes.

== Description ==
The length of the shell varies between 20.6 mm and 23.5 mm.

== Distribution ==
This marines species occurs off KwaZulu-Natal, South Africa.
