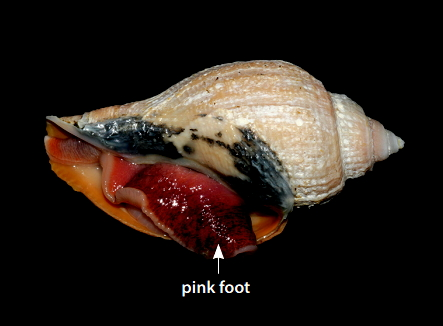
- Shell of Capensisvoluta lutosa

Scientific classification
- Kingdom: Animalia
- Phylum: Mollusca
- Class: Gastropoda
- Subclass: Caenogastropoda
- Order: Neogastropoda
- Family: Volutidae
- Genus: Capensisvoluta
- Species: C. lutosa

Binomial name
- Capensisvoluta lutosa (H. J. Koch, 1948)

Synonyms
- Athleta (Athleta) lutosa (H. J. Koch, 1948) alternative representation; Athleta lutosa (H. J. Koch, 1948) superseded combination; Volutocorbis lutosa H. J. Koch, 1948 superseded combination

= Capensisvoluta lutosa =

Species of gastropod

Capensisvoluta lutosa, common name the pink-foot hatch shell, is a species of sea snail, a marine gastropod mollusk in the family Volutidae, the volutes.

== Description ==
The length of the shell attains 110 mm, but usually considerably smaller (60 mm – 70mm).

The shell is relatively broad with a wide aperture, and its thickness is highly variable. The spire is conical with convex whorls and an indented suture. The sculpture is less distinctly cancellate, dominated by crisp spiral cords crossed by irregular growth lines. The ventral surface is coated with a thin, transparent glaze extending from the inner lip. The columella features four to six low pleats, sometimes arranged in pairs. The outer lip is not reflected, with a usually weakly thickened inner margin that bears indistinct ridges. The lip and callus are often deformed.

The surface is dull, often etched or eroded. Fresh specimens range from pale cream to apricot-pink, with the color most noticeable inside the aperture. The columellar pleats are white. The surface is frequently encrusted with a muddy deposit or stained reddish-brown. The animal is pinkish to mauve, heavily speckled with grey-black markings.

== Distribution ==
This marine species occurs off the west coast of South Africa, off Atlantic Cape (Angola to Saldanha Bay), at depths between 20 m and 220 m.
