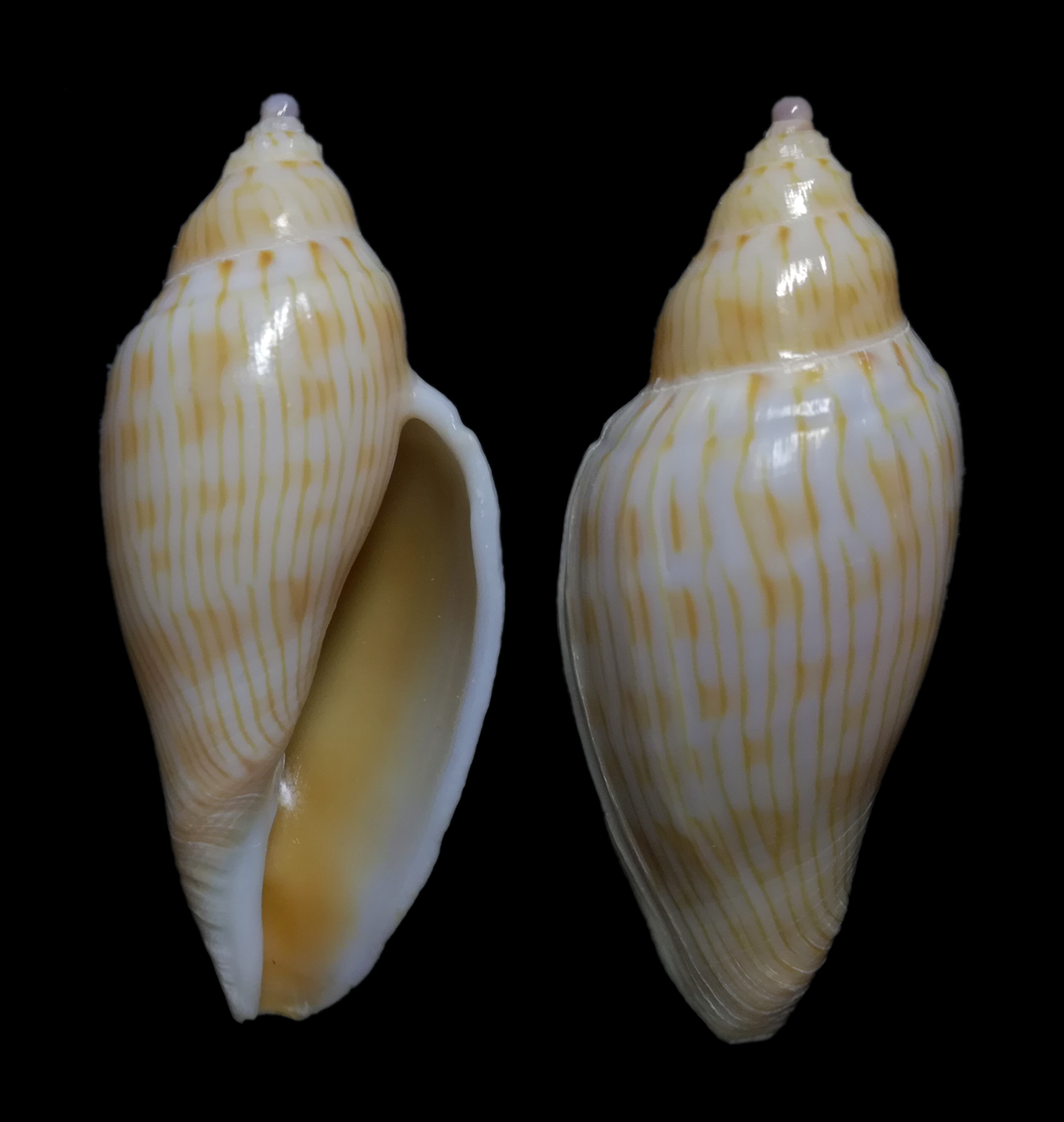
- Ternivoluta studeri

Scientific classification
- Kingdom: Animalia
- Phylum: Mollusca
- Class: Gastropoda
- Subclass: Caenogastropoda
- Order: Neogastropoda
- Family: Volutidae
- Genus: Ternivoluta
- Species: T. studeri

Binomial name
- Ternivoluta studeri (E. von Martens, 1897)

Synonyms
- Athleta (Ternivoluta) studeri (E. von Martens, 1897) superseded combination; Athleta studeri (E. von Martens, 1897) superseded combination; Voluta (Ternivoluta) studeri E. von Martens, 1897 superseded combination; Voluta studeri E. von Martens, 1897 superseded combination

= Ternivoluta studeri =

Species of gastropod

Ternivoluta studeri is a species of sea snail, a marine gastropod mollusk in the family Volutidae, the volutes.

There are two subspecies:

- Ternivoluta studeri studeri (Martens, 1897)
- Ternivoluta studeri swainensis Bail & limpus, 1998

== Description ==
This species attains a length of 52 mm, its diameter 22 mm.

(Original description in Latin) The shell is attenuated and quite thin. It is sculptured with a series of shoulder nodules and very subtle spiral striae, which are stronger towards the base. The shell is shiny, pale flesh-colored, and is painted with narrow, tawny, slightly wavy vertical lines. The spire is quite elevated, coronate, and step-like. The apex is globose, smooth, obliquely spiraled, and small. There are 6 whorls, which are slightly concave below the suture. The aperture is narrow. The external lip is thickened and white, being angular above and slightly sinuous below, and it is very slightly arched in the middle. The columellar lip is furnished with 4 major and 3 minor, slightly alternating, and very oblique folds. The interior of the throat is yellowish.

The shell is elongately fusiform, featuring a high, gradate spire and a rounded body whorl that tapers gently toward the anterior canal. A sutural groove is narrow but forms a prominent shoulder on the adult whorls. There are no sutural nodules.

Thin axial costae are present only on the first whorl, being absent from the succeeding whorls. Shoulder nodules are developed on the costae and persist to the adult whorls, but they are irregularly developed and much reduced in size. Spiral lirae are weakly developed and confined to the anterior portion of the body whorl. The columella possesses four major and three or four minor plaits.

The color pattern consists of thin axial chestnut bands and three interrupted, thicker spiral bands on the body whorl. One of these spiral bands is also present on the spire.

== Distribution ==
This marine species occurs off eastern Australia.
