= Afriathleta rosavittoriae =

Scientific classification
- Kingdom: Animalia
- Phylum: Mollusca
- Class: Gastropoda
- Subclass: Caenogastropoda
- Order: Neogastropoda
- Family: Volutidae
- Genus: Afriathleta
- Species: A. rosavittoriae

Binomial name
- Afriathleta rosavittoriae (Rehder, 1981)

Synonyms
- Athleta (Athleta) rosavittoriae (Rehder, 1981) alternative representation; Athleta rosavittoriae (Rehder, 1981) superseded combination; Volutocorbis rosavittoriae Rehder, 1981 superseded combination

Species of gastropod

Afriathleta rosavittoriae is a species of sea snail, a marine gastropod mollusk in the family Volutidae, the volutes.

== Description ==
The length of the shell attains 50.75 mm, its diameter 22.9 mm.

A. rosavittoriae is white and brown in color. Its shell size grows to be 38–52 millimeters.

== Distribution ==
This species occurs in the Indian Ocean off Somalia.
