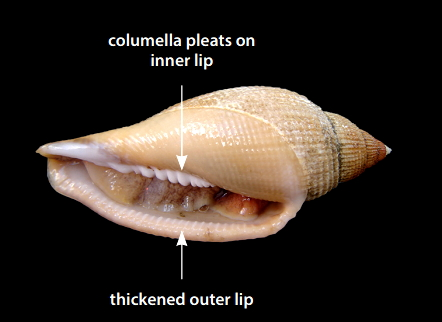
- Capensisvoluta abyssicola shell

Scientific classification
- Kingdom: Animalia
- Phylum: Mollusca
- Class: Gastropoda
- Subclass: Caenogastropoda
- Order: Neogastropoda
- Family: Volutidae
- Genus: Capensisvoluta
- Species: C. abyssicola

Binomial name
- Capensisvoluta abyssicola (Adams & Reeve, 1848)

Synonyms
- Athleta (Athleta) abyssicola (H. Adams & Reeve, 1848); Athleta abyssicola (A. Adams & Reeve, 1848) superseded combination; Athleta abyssicola abyssicola (A. Adams & Reeve, 1848) superseded combination; Voluta abyssicola H. Adams & Reeve, 1848 (basionym); Volutocorbis abyssicola (A. Adams & Reeve, 1848)

= Capensisvoluta abyssicola =

Species of gastropod

Capensisvoluta abyssicola, common name the yellow-foot hatch shell, is a species of sea snail, a marine gastropod mollusk in the family Volutidae, the volutes.

== Description ==
The length of the shell attains 105 mm.

The shell is moderately elongate, with variable width and spire height. The aperture is long and narrow, accounting for well over half the shell’s length. The spire is conical, and the sculpture is cancellate (hatched), consisting of relatively fine axial ribs and spiral cords of nearly equal strength. Much of the ventral surface is covered by a thin, transparent glaze extending from the inner lip. The inner lip features numerous columellar pleats that become progressively stronger toward the anterior. The outer lip is slightly reflected, with a thickened inner margin bearing numerous ridge-like denticles.

The surface is dull, often appearing etched or eroded. Fresh specimens range in color from biscuit to pale orangish- or pinkish-brown. The interior of the aperture is pale apricot, while the columellar pleats are white. The surface is frequently encrusted with a muddy deposit. The animal itself is greyish-white to yellow, heavily speckled with greyish markings.

== Distribution ==
This marine species occurs off the west coast of South Africa, off Atlantic Cape region (Walvis Bay to Cape Agulhas), at depths between 100 m and 550 m.
