= Ternivoluta pisororum =

Scientific classification
- Kingdom: Animalia
- Phylum: Mollusca
- Class: Gastropoda
- Subclass: Caenogastropoda
- Order: Neogastropoda
- Family: Volutidae
- Genus: Ternivoluta
- Species: T. pisororum

Binomial name
- Ternivoluta pisororum (H. Morrison, 2006)

Synonyms
- Athleta (Ternivoluta) pisororum H. Morrison, 2006 superseded combination; Athleta pisororum H. Morrison, 2006 ·

Species of gastropod

Ternivoluta pisororum is a species of sea snail, a marine gastropod mollusk in the family Volutidae, the volutes.

== Distribution ==
This marine species occurs off Queensland, Australia.
