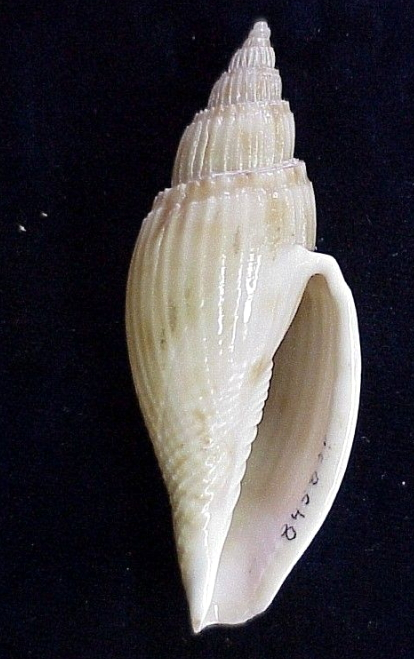
- Shell of Athleta magister (specimen at the Smithsonian Institution)

Scientific classification
- Kingdom: Animalia
- Phylum: Mollusca
- Class: Gastropoda
- Subclass: Caenogastropoda
- Order: Neogastropoda
- Family: Volutidae
- Genus: Athleta
- Species: A. magister

Binomial name
- Athleta magister (Kilburn, 1980)

Synonyms
- Athleta boswellae f. magister (Kilburn, 1980); Volutocorbis magister Kilburn, 1980 (original combination)

= Athleta magister =

Species of gastropod

Athleta magister is a species of sea snail, a marine gastropod mollusk in the family Volutidae, the volutes.

== Distribution ==
This marine species occurs off the Agulhas Bank, South Africa.
