= Capensisvoluta disparilis =

Scientific classification
- Kingdom: Animalia
- Phylum: Mollusca
- Class: Gastropoda
- Subclass: Caenogastropoda
- Order: Neogastropoda
- Family: Volutidae
- Genus: Capensisvoluta
- Species: C. disparilis

Binomial name
- Capensisvoluta disparilis (Rehder, 1969)

Synonyms
- Athleta (Athleta) disparilis (Rehder, 1969); Athleta disparilis (Rehder, 1969) superseded combination; Volutocorbis disparilis Rehder, 1969 (basionym)

Species of gastropod

Capensisvoluta disparilis is a species of sea snail, a marine gastropod mollusk in the family Volutid November ae, the volutes.

== Distribution ==
Deepwater: Agulhas Bank, South Africa.
