= N. gardneri =

N. gardneri may refer to:

- Neonothopanus gardneri, a fungus species
- Notovoluta gardneri, a sea snail species

== See also ==
- Gardneri
