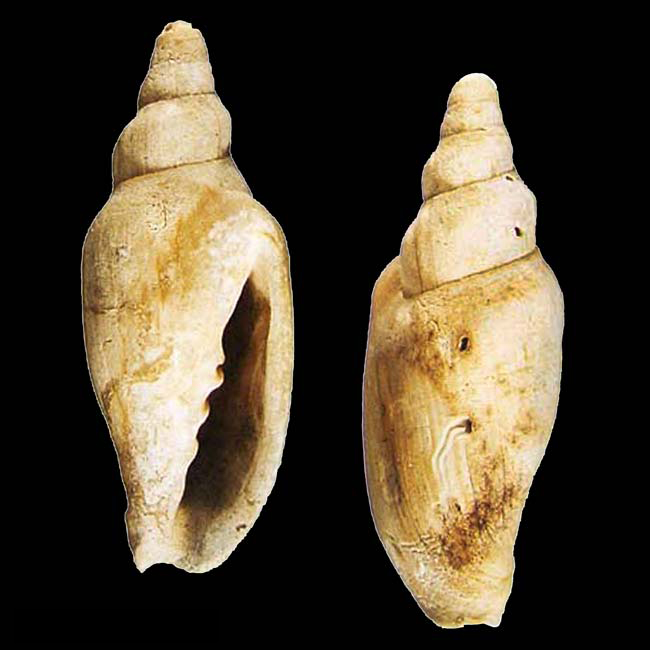

Scientific classification
- Kingdom: Animalia
- Phylum: Mollusca
- Class: Gastropoda
- Subclass: Caenogastropoda
- Order: Neogastropoda
- Family: Volutidae
- Genus: Notovoluta
- Species: N. hoskensae

Binomial name
- Notovoluta hoskensae Poppe, 1992

= Notovoluta hoskensae =

Species of gastropod

Notovoluta hoskensae is a species of sea snail, a marine gastropod mollusk in the family Volutidae, the volutes.
