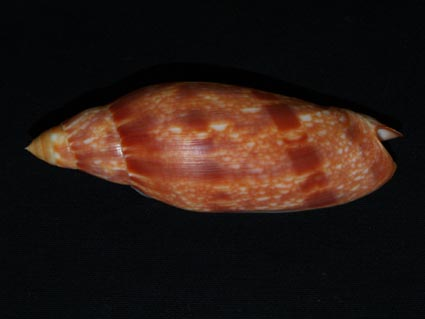
- A shell of Volutoconus grossi

Scientific classification
- Kingdom: Animalia
- Phylum: Mollusca
- Class: Gastropoda
- Subclass: Caenogastropoda
- Order: Neogastropoda
- Family: Volutidae
- Genus: Volutoconus
- Species: V. grossi

Binomial name
- Volutoconus grossi (Iredale, 1927)

= Volutoconus grossi =

Species of gastropod

Volutoconus grossi, common name Gross's volute or McMichael's Volute or Tin Can Bay Volute, is a species of sea snail, a marine gastropod mollusk in the family Volutidae, the volutes.

== Distribution ==
This species is present in Eastern Australia (New South Wales and Queensland).

== Description ==
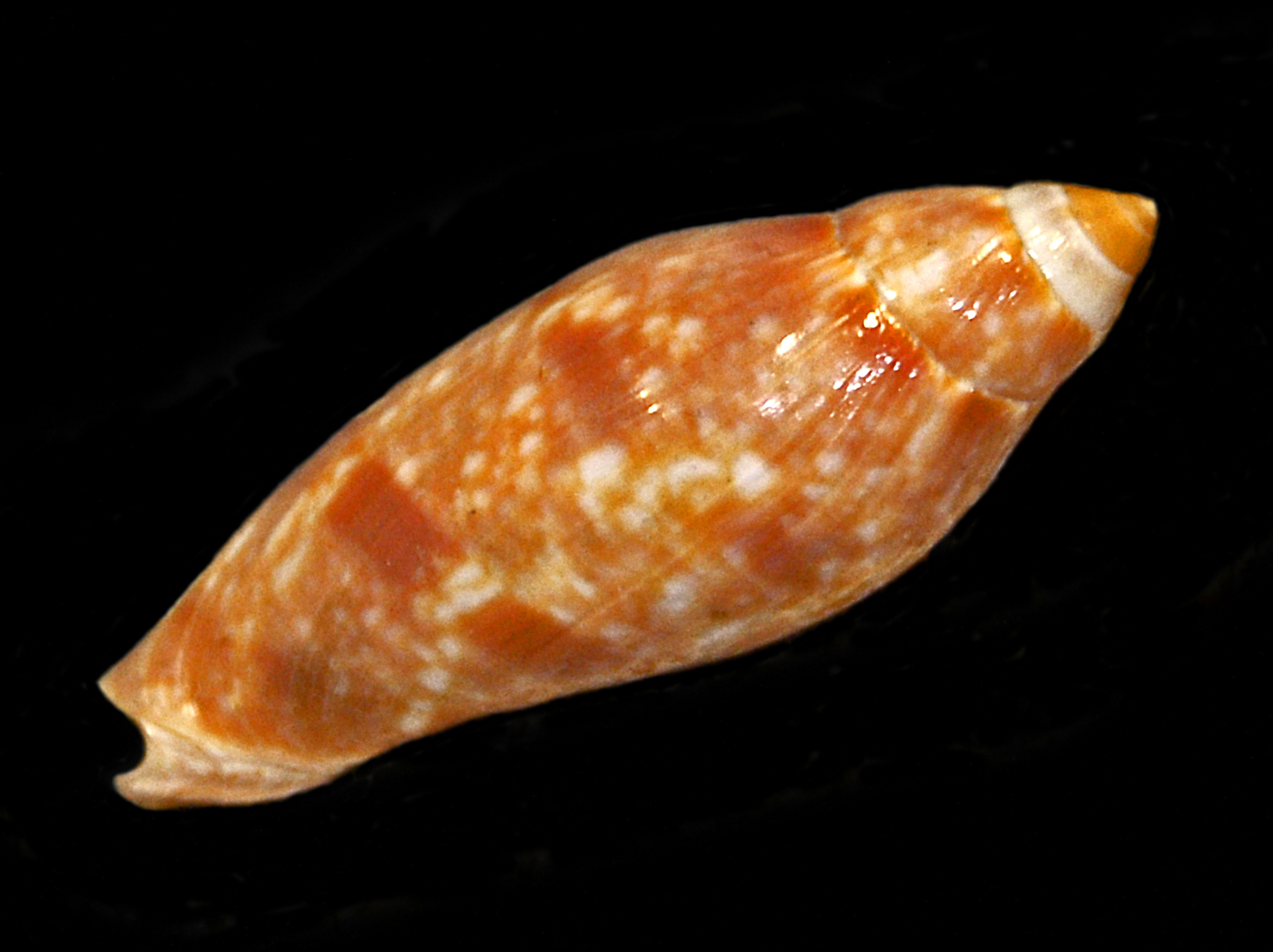
A shell of Volutoconus grossi

Shells of Volutoconus grossi can reach a size of 59–175 millimetres (2.3–6.9 in). These moderately large shells are solid, elongate, with rounded apex and small sharp protoconch. Whorls are usually smooth, but sometimes may be axially ribbed. The surface shows four spiral bands of chocolate patches on a cream or salmon or reddish-brown colored background with white tent-shaped markings. Spires are quite elevated. Columella has four plaits. Volutoconus grossi occurs as many different forms in restricted areas.

== Habitat ==
These uncommon sea snails live on sandy substrate at depths of 36 to 216 m.

== Bibliography ==
- A.G. Hinton - Guide to Australian Shells
- Alan G. Hinton - Shells of New Guinea & Central Pacific
- Allan, J. 1956. The reappearance of a rare Australian volute shell, Amoria grossi Iredale (Mollusca: Gastropoda), a new record for New South Wales. Proceedings of the Royal Zoological Society of New South Wales 1954–55
- Bail P. & Limpus A. (2013) Revision of the genus Volutoconus Crosse, 1871 (Gastropoda: Volutidae). Visaya 4(1): 25–75.
- Barry Wilson - Australian Marine Shells Part 2
- Harald Douté, M. A. Fontana Angioy - Volutes, The Doute collection
