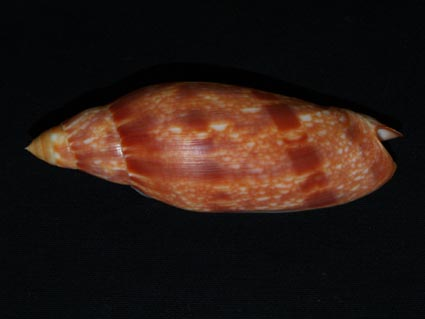
- A shell of the red volute, Volutoconus grossi

Scientific classification
- Kingdom: Animalia
- Phylum: Mollusca
- Class: Gastropoda
- Subclass: Caenogastropoda
- Order: Neogastropoda
- Family: Volutidae
- Subfamily: Amoriinae
- Tribe: Notovolutini
- Genus: Volutoconus; Crosse, 1871

Species
- Volutoconus bednalli Volutoconus coniformis Volutoconus grossi Volutoconus hargreavesi

= Volutoconus =

Genus of molluscs

Volutoconus is a small taxonomic genus of four rare species of sea snails, medium-sized predatory marine gastropod mollusks in the family Volutidae.

== Distribution ==
Volutoconus species live in tropical and subtropical waters. All four species in the genus live in Australia, and the range of one species, Volutoconus bednalli, extends to Papua New Guinea and Indonesia. Volutoconus snails live in coarse sand and rubble from the shallow subtidal zone to over 200 m depth.

== Shell description ==
The shells of Volutoconus species have a bluntly rounded protoconch with a small sharp projection called a calcarella. They are solid, glossy, cylindrical-shaped shells with an elongate aperture that has four distinct columellar plicae. Volutoconus coniformis, V. grossi and V. hargreavesi are reddish-brown in color, and V. bednalli is yellow with reticulate blue-black bands. Volutoconus grossi form mcmichaeli and Volutoconus hargreavesi form daiseyae have distinct axial ribs.

== Notes ==
Volutoconus are uncommonly found alive. They are sometimes accidentally caught by fishermen as bycatch on prawn or scallop trawlers. These volutes are nocturnal and have a small foot compared to many other volutes. The foot, head, propodium, eyes and siphon of Volutoconus hargreavesi and Volutoconus grossi have a similar color pattern to that of the shell.
