= Volutoconus coniformis =

Scientific classification
- Kingdom: Animalia
- Phylum: Mollusca
- Class: Gastropoda
- Subclass: Caenogastropoda
- Order: Neogastropoda
- Family: Volutidae
- Genus: Volutoconus
- Species: V. coniformis

Binomial name
- Volutoconus coniformis (Cox, 1871)

Synonyms
- Voluta coniformis Cox, 1871 (basionym)

Species of gastropod

Volutoconus coniformis, common name : the Cone-shaped Volute, is a species of sea snail, a marine gastropod mollusk in the family Volutidae, the volutes.

== Description ==
The size of an adult shell varies between 50 mm and 75 mm.

== Distribution ==
This species is found in the Coral Sea along Northwest Australia.
