= Notovoluta baconi =

Scientific classification
- Kingdom: Animalia
- Phylum: Mollusca
- Class: Gastropoda
- Subclass: Caenogastropoda
- Order: Neogastropoda
- Family: Volutidae
- Genus: Notovoluta
- Species: N. baconi

Binomial name
- Notovoluta baconi Wilson, 1972

Species of gastropod

Notovoluta baconi is a species of sea snail, a marine gastropod mollusk in the family Volutidae, the volutes.
