= Notovoluta norwestralis =

Scientific classification
- Kingdom: Animalia
- Phylum: Mollusca
- Class: Gastropoda
- Subclass: Caenogastropoda
- Order: Neogastropoda
- Family: Volutidae
- Genus: Notovoluta
- Species: N. norwestralis

Binomial name
- Notovoluta norwestralis Bail & Limpus, 2003

Species of gastropod

Notovoluta norwestralis is a species of sea snail, a marine gastropod mollusk in the family Volutidae, the volutes.
