= Notovoluta gerondiosi =

Scientific classification
- Kingdom: Animalia
- Phylum: Mollusca
- Class: Gastropoda
- Subclass: Caenogastropoda
- Order: Neogastropoda
- Family: Volutidae
- Genus: Notovoluta
- Species: N. gerondiosi

Binomial name
- Notovoluta gerondiosi Bail & Limpus, 2005

Species of gastropod

Notovoluta gerondiosi is a species of sea snail, a marine gastropod mollusk in the family Volutidae, the volutes.
