= Notovolutini =

Scientific classification
- Kingdom: Animalia
- Phylum: Mollusca
- Class: Gastropoda
- Subclass: Caenogastropoda
- Order: Neogastropoda
- Family: Volutidae
- Subfamily: Amoriinae
- Tribe: Notovolutini; Bail & Poppe, 2001

Genera
- Notovoluta Cotton, 1946; Volutoconus Crosse, 1871

Tribe of molluscs

Notovolutini is a tribe of sea snails, a marine gastropod mollusks in the family Volutidae.
