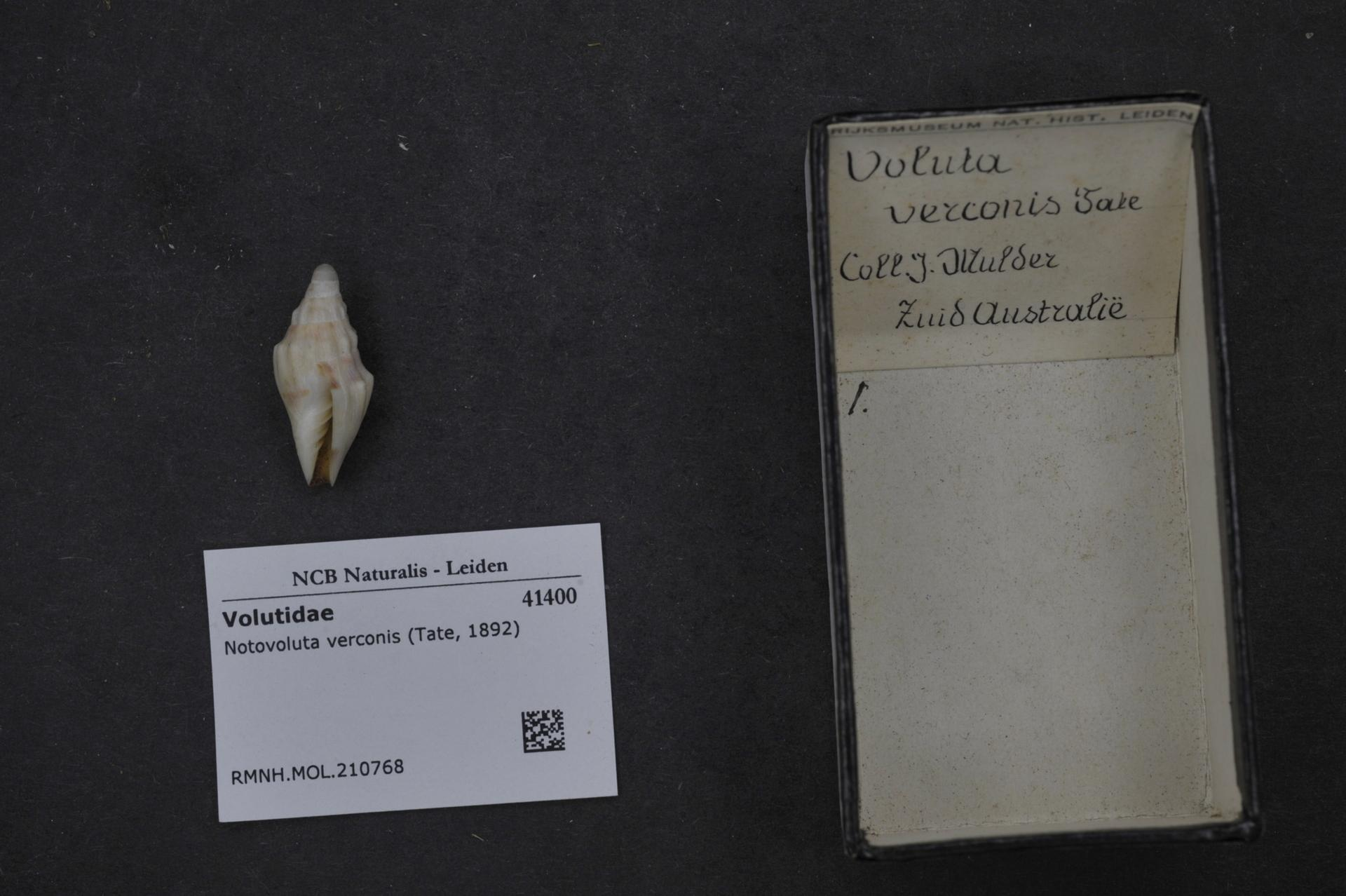

Scientific classification
- Kingdom: Animalia
- Phylum: Mollusca
- Class: Gastropoda
- Subclass: Caenogastropoda
- Order: Neogastropoda
- Family: Volutidae
- Genus: Notovoluta
- Species: N. verconis

Binomial name
- Notovoluta verconis (Tate, 1892)

= Notovoluta verconis =

Species of gastropod

Notovoluta verconis is a species of sea snail, a marine gastropod mollusk in the family Volutidae, the volutes.

== Description ==
This species attains a size of 38 mm.

== Distribution ==
South Australia.
