= Volutoconus hargreavesi =

Scientific classification
- Kingdom: Animalia
- Phylum: Mollusca
- Class: Gastropoda
- Subclass: Caenogastropoda
- Order: Neogastropoda
- Family: Volutidae
- Genus: Volutoconus
- Species: V. hargreavesi

Binomial name
- Volutoconus hargreavesi Angas, 1872

Species of gastropod

Volutoconus hargreavesi is a species of sea snail, a marine gastropod mollusk in the family Volutidae, the volutes.

== Description ==
Length of shells vary from 65 to 128 mm.
