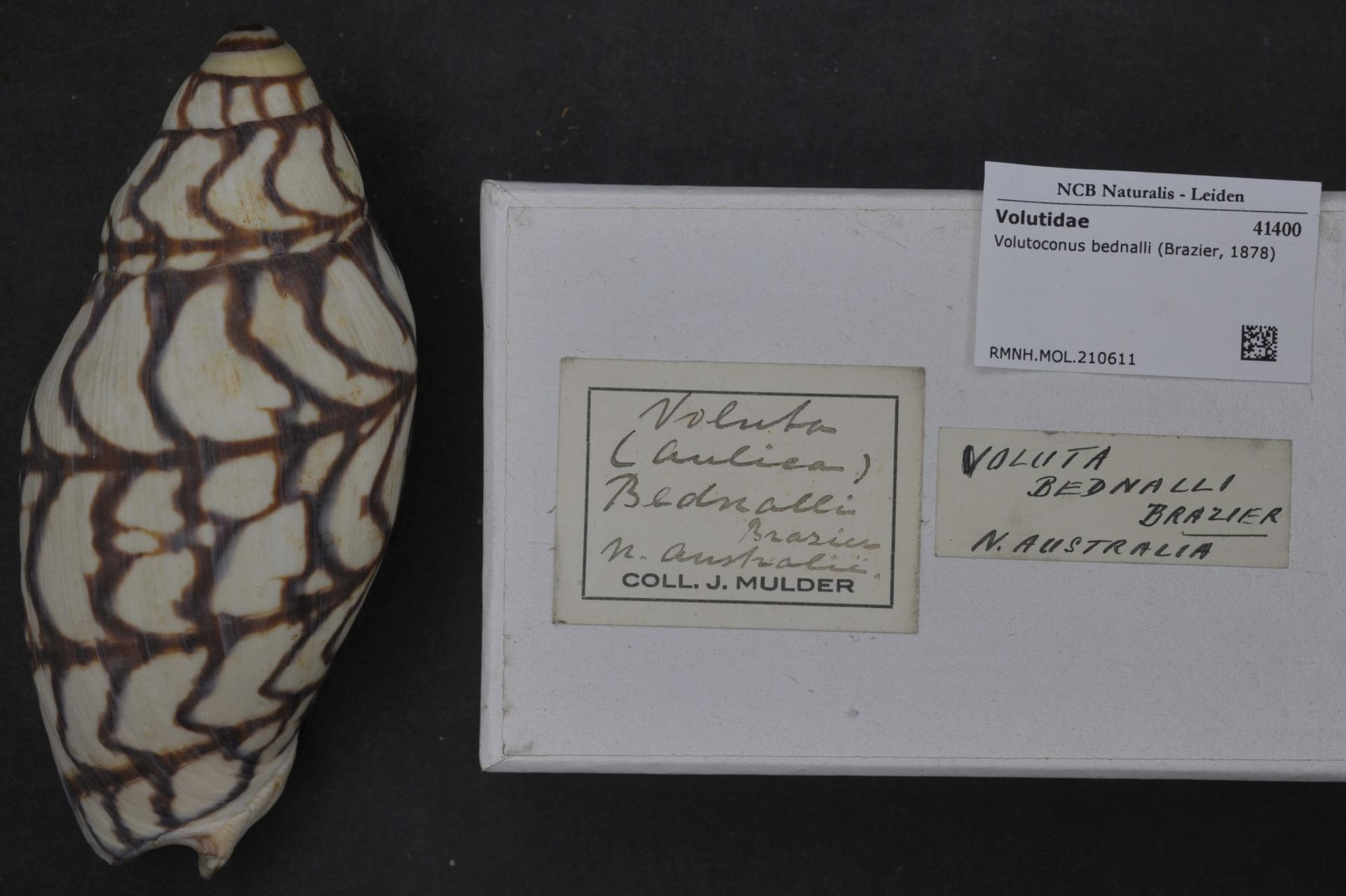
- Volutoconus bednalli in the Naturalis collection

Scientific classification
- Kingdom: Animalia
- Phylum: Mollusca
- Class: Gastropoda
- Subclass: Caenogastropoda
- Order: Neogastropoda
- Family: Volutidae
- Genus: Volutoconus
- Species: V. bednalli

Binomial name
- Volutoconus bednalli (Brazier, 1878)

= Volutoconus bednalli =

Species of gastropod

Volutoconus bednalli or Bednall's Volute is a species of sea snail, a marine gastropod mollusk in the family Volutidae, the volutes. It is named after malacologist William Tompson Bednall. It was historically treasured by shell collectors but has since become much less rare with the introduction of commercial dredging and trawling

== Description ==
The length of the snails shell ranges from 9 to 13 centimeters, but specimens have been recorded to grow up to 16.5 cm. The shell pattern is notably distinct for a volute, with base colouration ranging between pure white and yellowish white.

== Distribution ==
The snail has been found in the Arafura Sea, where it prefers sandy areas at depths of 30 feet (9.1 m) to 300 feet (91 m)
