= Notovoluta capricornea =

Scientific classification
- Kingdom: Animalia
- Phylum: Mollusca
- Class: Gastropoda
- Subclass: Caenogastropoda
- Order: Neogastropoda
- Family: Volutidae
- Genus: Notovoluta
- Species: N. capricornea

Binomial name
- Notovoluta capricornea (Wilson, 1972)

Synonyms
- Notovoluta capricorneus (Wilson, 1972)

Species of gastropod

Notovoluta capricornea is a species of sea snail, a marine gastropod mollusk in the family Volutidae, the volutes.
