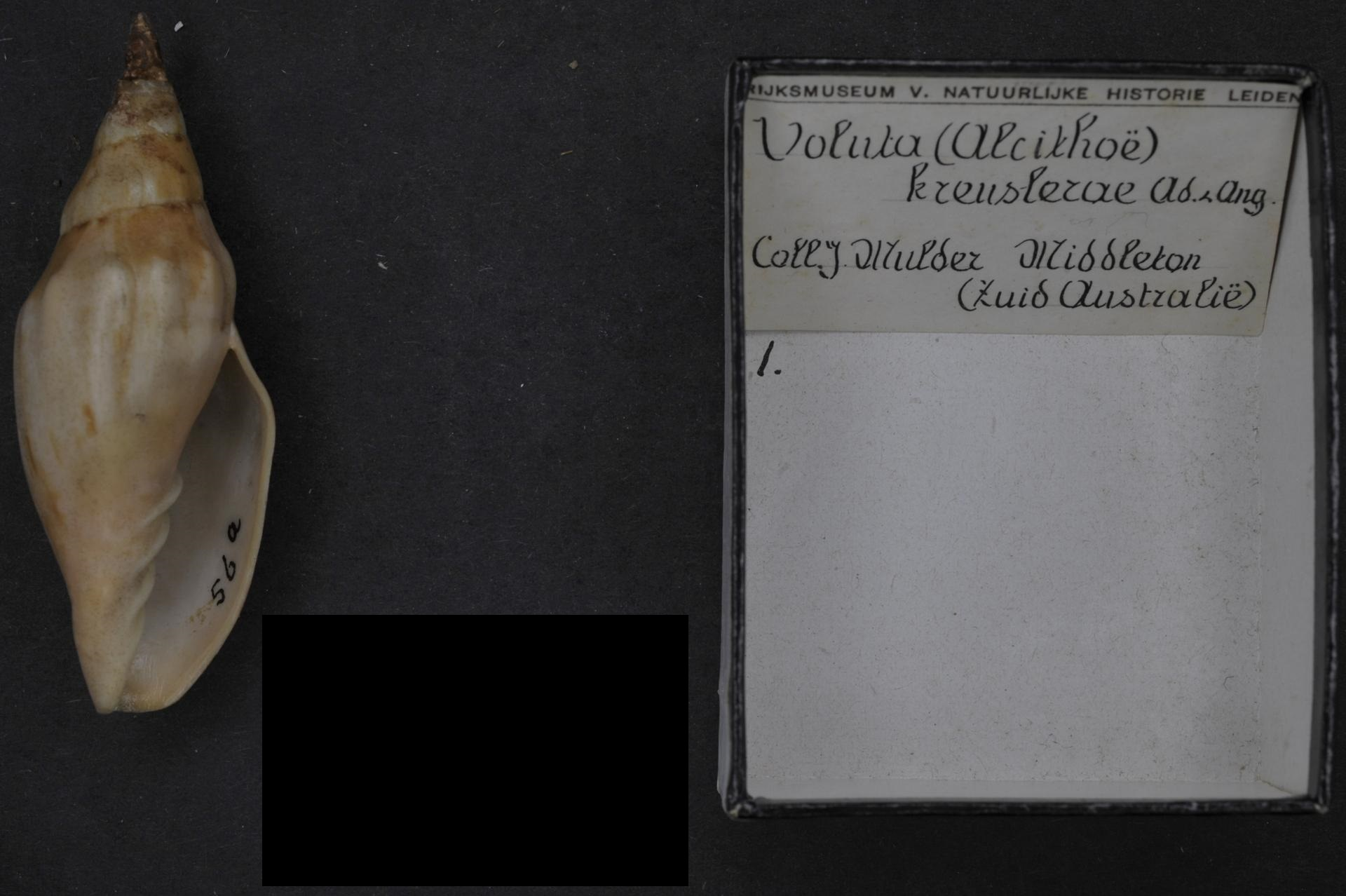
- Notovoluta kreuslerae shell

Scientific classification
- Kingdom: Animalia
- Phylum: Mollusca
- Class: Gastropoda
- Subclass: Caenogastropoda
- Order: Neogastropoda
- Family: Volutidae
- Subfamily: Amoriinae
- Tribe: Notovolutini
- Genus: Notovoluta; Cotton, 1946

= Notovoluta =

Genus of gastropods

Notovoluta is a genus of sea snails, marine gastropod mollusks in the family Volutidae.

== Species ==
Species within the genus Notovoluta include:

- Notovoluta baconi Wilson, 1972
- Notovoluta capricornea (Wilson, 1972)
- Notovoluta gardneri Darragh, 1983
- Notovoluta gerondiosi Bail & Limpus, 2005
- Notovoluta hoskensae Poppe, 1992
- Notovoluta kreuslerae (Angas, 1865)
- Notovoluta norwestralis Bail & Limpus, 2003
- Notovoluta occidua Cotton, 1946
- Notovoluta pseudolirata (Tate, 1888)
- Notovoluta verconis (Tate, 1892)
