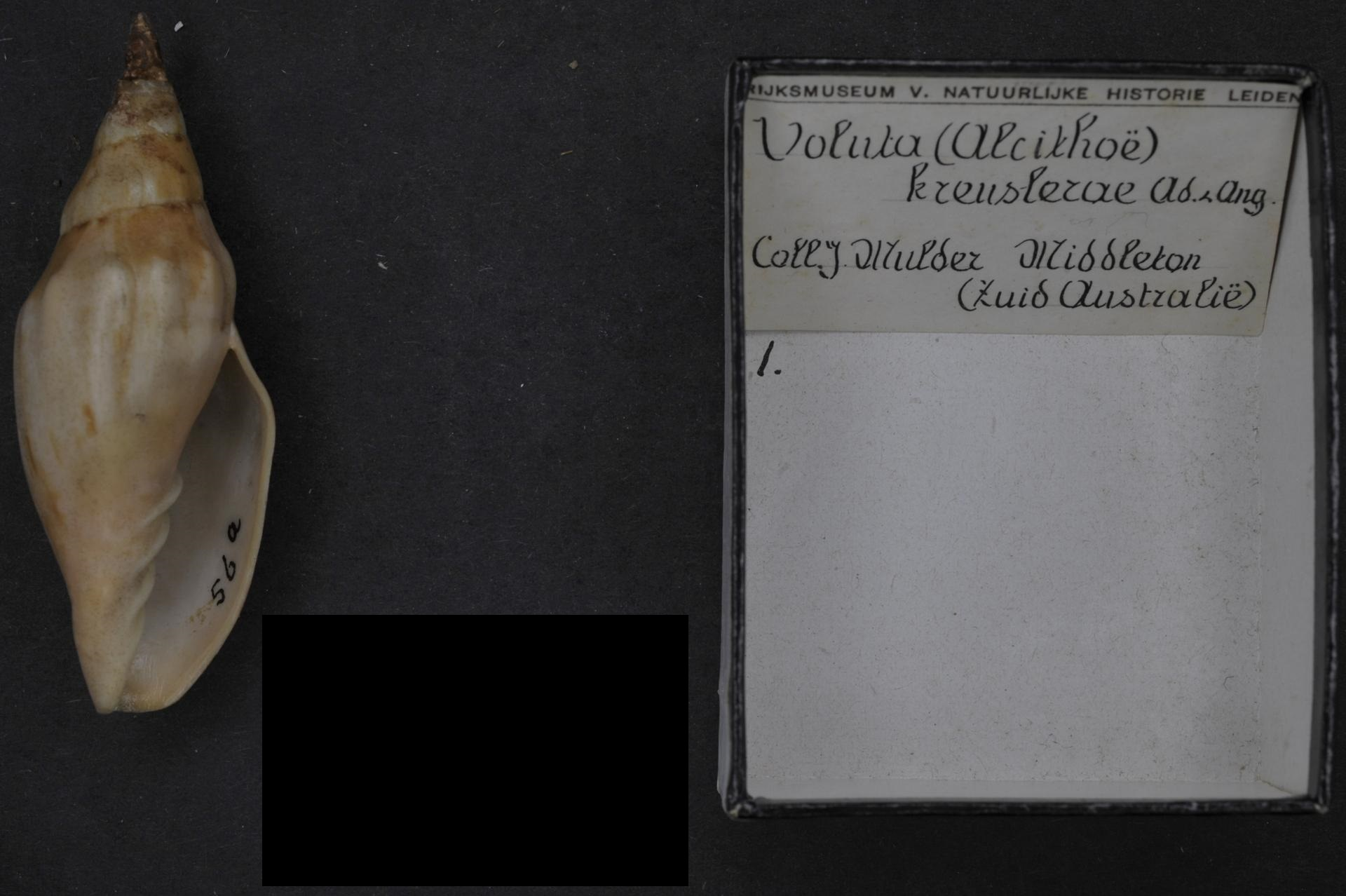
- Notovoluta kreuslerae shell

Scientific classification
- Kingdom: Animalia
- Phylum: Mollusca
- Class: Gastropoda
- Subclass: Caenogastropoda
- Order: Neogastropoda
- Family: Volutidae
- Genus: Notovoluta
- Species: N. kreuslerae

Binomial name
- Notovoluta kreuslerae (Angas, 1865)

Synonyms
- Voluta kreuslerae Angas, 1865 (basionym)

= Notovoluta kreuslerae =

Species of gastropod

Notovoluta kreuslerae, common name : Kreusler's volute, is a species of sea snail, a marine gastropod mollusk in the family Volutidae, the volutes.

== Description ==
The size of an adult shell varies between 60 mm and 100 mm.

== Distribution ==
This species is distributed along South Australia.
