= Notovoluta pseudolirata =

Scientific classification
- Kingdom: Animalia
- Phylum: Mollusca
- Class: Gastropoda
- Subclass: Caenogastropoda
- Order: Neogastropoda
- Family: Volutidae
- Genus: Notovoluta
- Species: N. pseudolirata

Binomial name
- Notovoluta pseudolirata (Tate, 1888)

Species of gastropod

Notovoluta pseudolirata is a species of sea snail, a marine gastropod mollusk in the family Volutidae, the volutes.

== Description ==
This deepwater species attains a size of 50-70 mm.

== Distribution ==
Western Australia. Outer continental shelf, at 180 metres depth.
