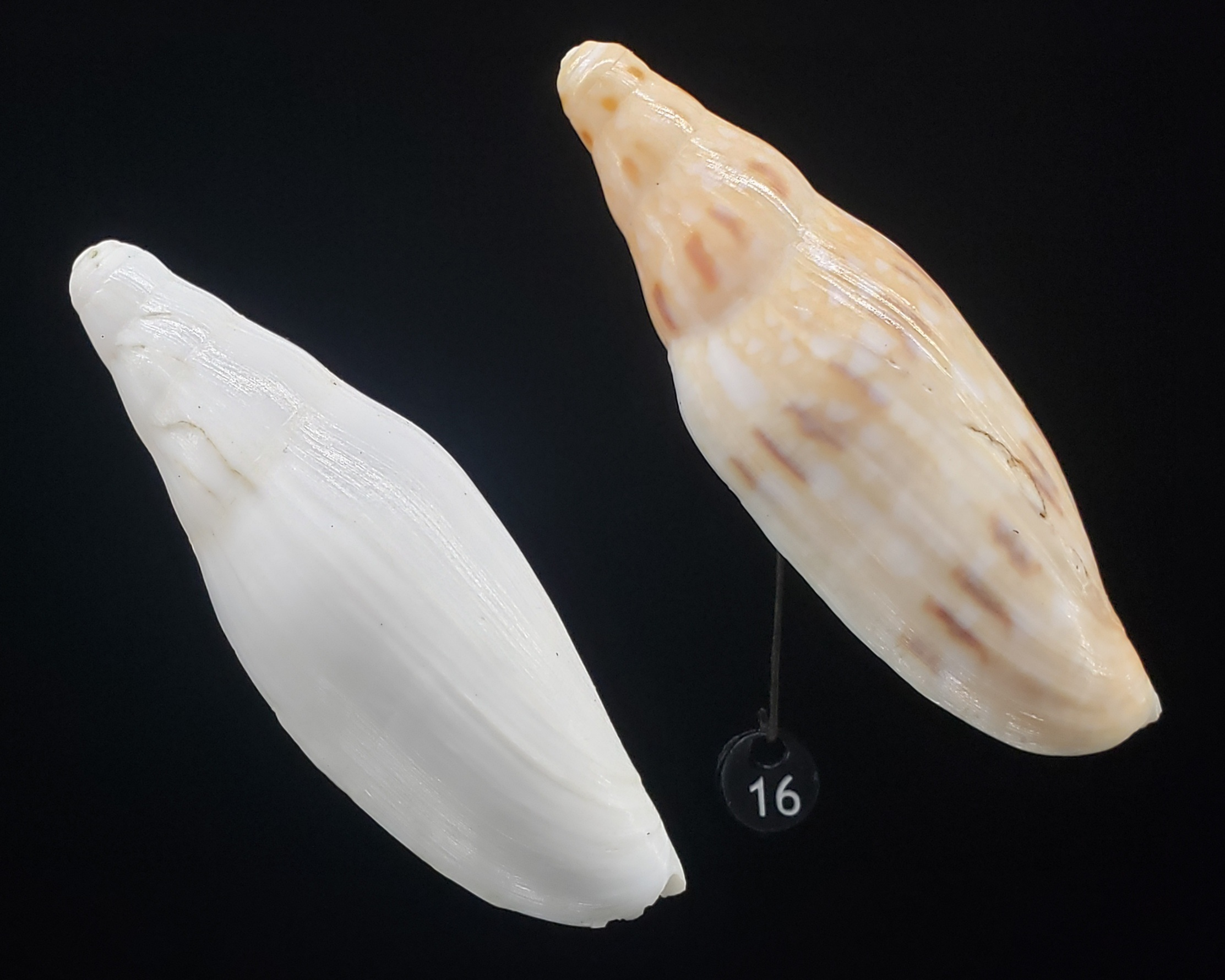
- Notovoluta gardneri natural color and albino variants

Scientific classification
- Kingdom: Animalia
- Phylum: Mollusca
- Class: Gastropoda
- Subclass: Caenogastropoda
- Order: Neogastropoda
- Family: Volutidae
- Genus: Notovoluta
- Species: N. gardneri

Binomial name
- Notovoluta gardneri Darragh, 1983

= Notovoluta gardneri =

Species of gastropod

Notovoluta gardneri is a species of sea snail, a marine gastropod mollusk in the family Volutidae, the volutes.

== Description ==
The species attains a size of 75-85 mm.

== Distribution ==
Queensland, East coast of Australia.
