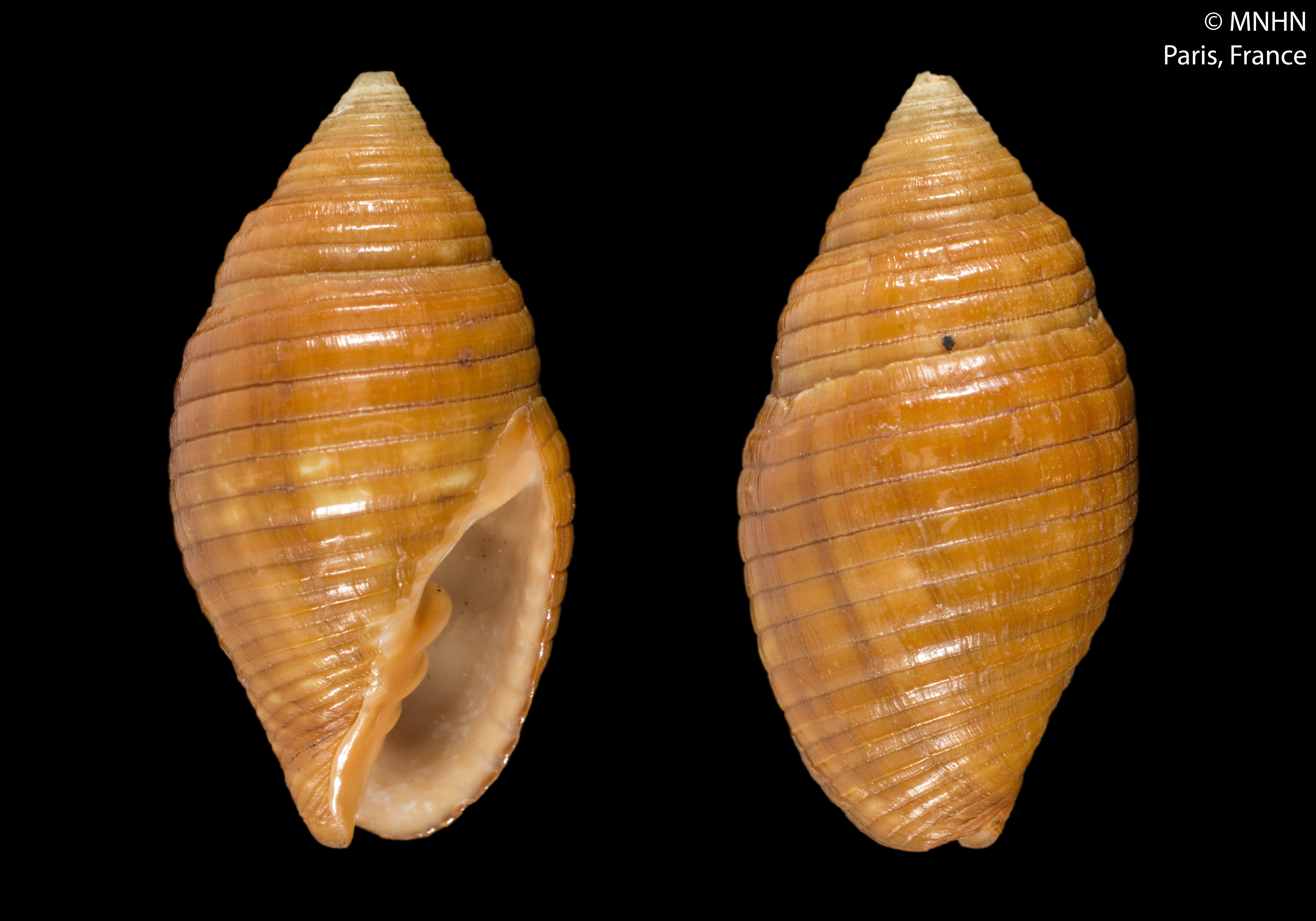
- Shell of Pseudonebularia chrysalis (holotype at MNHN, Paris)

Scientific classification
- Kingdom: Animalia
- Phylum: Mollusca
- Class: Gastropoda
- Subclass: Caenogastropoda
- Order: Neogastropoda
- Superfamily: Mitroidea
- Family: Mitridae
- Subfamily: Mitrinae
- Genus: Pseudonebularia; Fedosov, Herrmann, Kantor & Bouchet, 2018

Type species
- Mitra tornata Reeve, 1845

Species
- See text

= Pseudonebularia =

Genus of gastropods

Pseudonebularia is a genus of sea snails, marine gastropod mollusks in the subfamily Mitrinae of the family Mitridae.

== Species ==
Species within the genus Pseudonebularia include:

- Pseudonebularia atjehensis (Oostingh, 1939)
- Pseudonebularia chrysalis (Reeve, 1844)
- Pseudonebularia cingulata (Reeve, 1844)
- Pseudonebularia connectens (Dautzenberg & Bouge, 1923)
- Pseudonebularia cucumerina (Lamarck, 1811)
- Pseudonebularia damasomonteiroi (T. Cossignani & V. Cossignani, 2007)
- Pseudonebularia doliolum (Küster, 1839)
- Pseudonebularia dovpeledi (H. Turner, 1997)
- Pseudonebularia fraga (H. Turner, 1997)
- Pseudonebularia gracilefragum (H. Turner, 2007)
- Pseudonebularia indentata (G. B. Sowerby II, 1874)
- Pseudonebularia kantori (Poppe, Tagaro & R. Salisbury, 2009)
- Pseudonebularia lienardi G. B. Sowerby II, 1874)
- Pseudonebularia maesta (Reeve, 1845)
- Pseudonebularia pediculus (Lamarck, 1811)
- Pseudonebularia perdulca (Poppe, Tagaro & R. Salisbury, 2009)
- Pseudonebularia proscissa (Reeve, 1844)
- Pseudonebularia rotundilirata (Reeve, 1844)
- Pseudonebularia rubiginea (A. Adams, 1855)
- Pseudonebularia rubritincta (Reeve, 1844)
- Pseudonebularia rueppellii (Reeve, 1844)
- Pseudonebularia rutila (A. Adams, 1853)
- Pseudonebularia sarinoae (Poppe, 2008)
- Pseudonebularia semiferruginea (Reeve, 1845)
- Pseudonebularia silviae (H. Turner, 2007)
- Pseudonebularia suturistrigata Marrow, 2020
- Pseudonebularia tabanula (Lamarck, 1811)
- Pseudonebularia tornata (Reeve, 1845)
- Pseudonebularia wareni (Poppe, Tagaro & R. Salisbury, 2009)
- Pseudonebularia willani (Poppe, Tagaro & R. Salisbury, 2009)

Synonyms

- Pseudonebularia cuyosae(Poppe, 2008) : synonym of Acromargarita cuyosae (Poppe, 2008)
- Pseudonebularia kilburni (Poppe, Tagaro & R. Salisbury, 2009): synonym of Acromargarita kilburni (Poppe, Tagaro & R. Salisbury, 2009)
- Pseudonebularia oliverai (Poppe, 2008): synonym of Acromargarita oliverai (Poppe, 2008)
- Pseudonebularia yayanae (S.-I Huang, 2011): synonym of Acromargarita yayanae (S.-I Huang, 2011)
