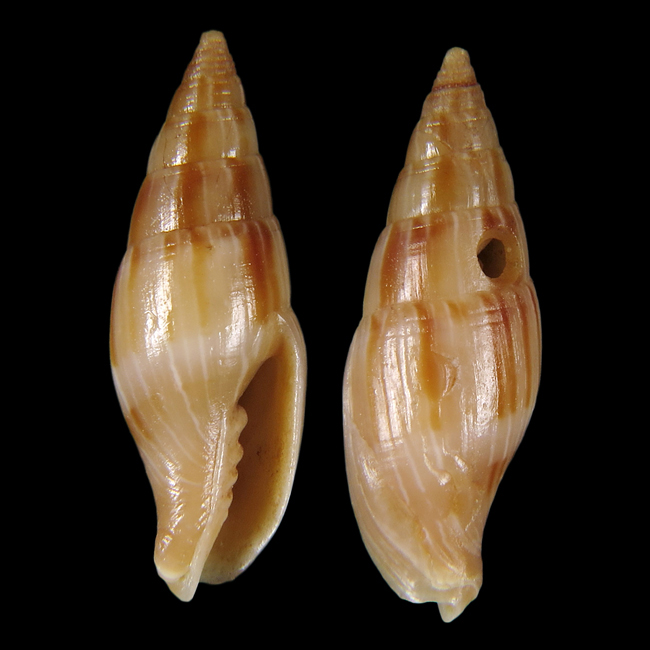
- Shell of Acromargarita semperi

Scientific classification
- Kingdom: Animalia
- Phylum: Mollusca
- Class: Gastropoda
- Subclass: Caenogastropoda
- Order: Neogastropoda
- Superfamily: Mitroidea
- Family: Mitridae
- Subfamily: Mitrinae
- Genus: Acromargarita; S.-I Huang, 2021

Type species
- Mitra (Nebularia) yayanae S.-I. Huang, 2011

Species
- See text

= Acromargarita =

Genus of gastropods

Acromargarita is a genus of sea snails, marine gastropod mollusks in the subfamily Mitrinae of the family Mitridae.

== Species ==
Species within the genus Acromargarita include:

- Acromargarita cappuccino S.-I Huang, 2021
- Acromargarita cuyosae (Poppe, 2008)
- Acromargarita deynzeri (Cernohorsky, 1980)
- Acromargarita kilburni (Poppe, Tagaro & R. Salisbury, 2009)
- Acromargarita mackayorum (S.-I Huang & Q.-Y. Chuo, 2019)
- Acromargarita musa S.-I Huang, 2021
- Acromargarita oliverai (Poppe, 2008)
- Acromargarita semperi (Poppe, Tagaro & R. Salisbury, 2009)
- Acromargarita spes S.-I Huang, 2023
- Acromargarita yayanae (S.-I Huang, 2011)
