= Pseudonebularia rubiginea =

Scientific classification
- Kingdom: Animalia
- Phylum: Mollusca
- Class: Gastropoda
- Subclass: Caenogastropoda
- Order: Neogastropoda
- Superfamily: Mitroidea
- Family: Mitridae
- Subfamily: Mitrinae
- Genus: Pseudonebularia
- Species: P. rubiginea

Binomial name
- Pseudonebularia rubiginea (A. Adams, 1855)

Synonyms
- Mitra rubiginea A. Adams, 1855

Species of gastropod

Pseudonebularia rubiginea is a species of sea snail, a marine gastropod mollusk, in the family Mitridae, the miters or miter snails.
