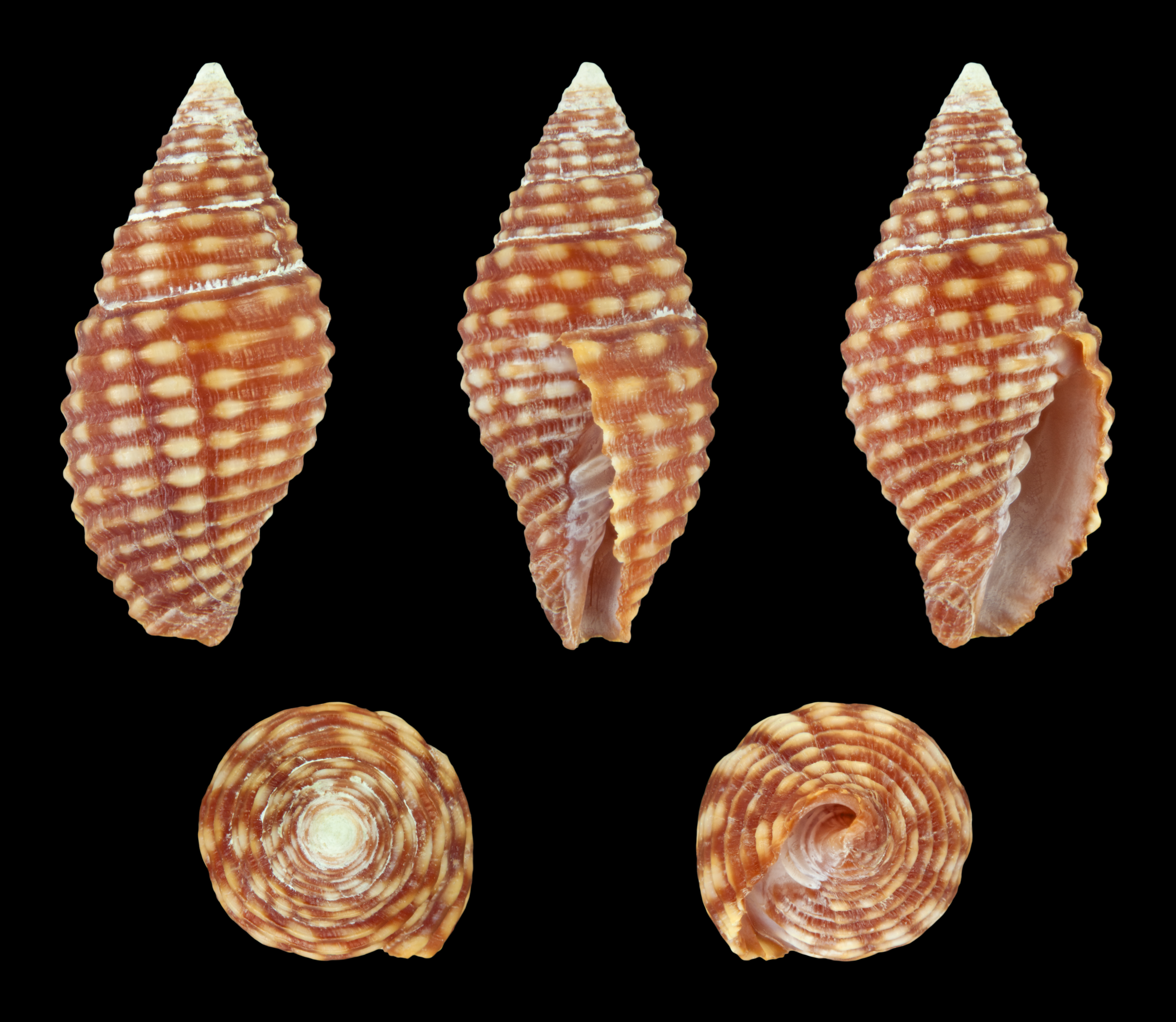

Scientific classification
- Kingdom: Animalia
- Phylum: Mollusca
- Class: Gastropoda
- Subclass: Caenogastropoda
- Order: Neogastropoda
- Family: Mitridae
- Genus: Pseudonebularia
- Species: P. fraga

Binomial name
- Pseudonebularia fraga (Quoy & Gaimard, 1833)

Synonyms
- Mitra fraga Quoy & Gaimard, 1833

= Pseudonebularia fraga =

Species of gastropod

Pseudonebularia fraga is a species of sea snail, a marine gastropod mollusk in the family Mitridae, the miters or miter snails.

== Description ==
This species attains a size of 27 mm.

== Distribution ==
Pacific Ocean: Guam.
