= Pseudonebularia gracilefragum =

Scientific classification
- Kingdom: Animalia
- Phylum: Mollusca
- Class: Gastropoda
- Subclass: Caenogastropoda
- Order: Neogastropoda
- Family: Mitridae
- Genus: Pseudonebularia
- Species: P. gracilefragum

Binomial name
- Pseudonebularia gracilefragum (Turner, 2007)

Synonyms
- Mitra gracilefragum Turner, 2007

Species of gastropod

Pseudonebularia gracilefragum is a species of sea snail, a marine gastropod mollusk in the family Mitridae, the miters or miter snails.

== Description ==
This species attains a size of 20-25 mm.

== Distribution ==
Tropical Indo-Pacific (Maldives, Indonesia, Vietnam, Philippines, Okinawa, Papua New Guinea, Solomons, Marquesas Islands). From fairly shallow subtidal water (8-20 m) to deep water (180 m), on bottoms of sand and coral rubble.
