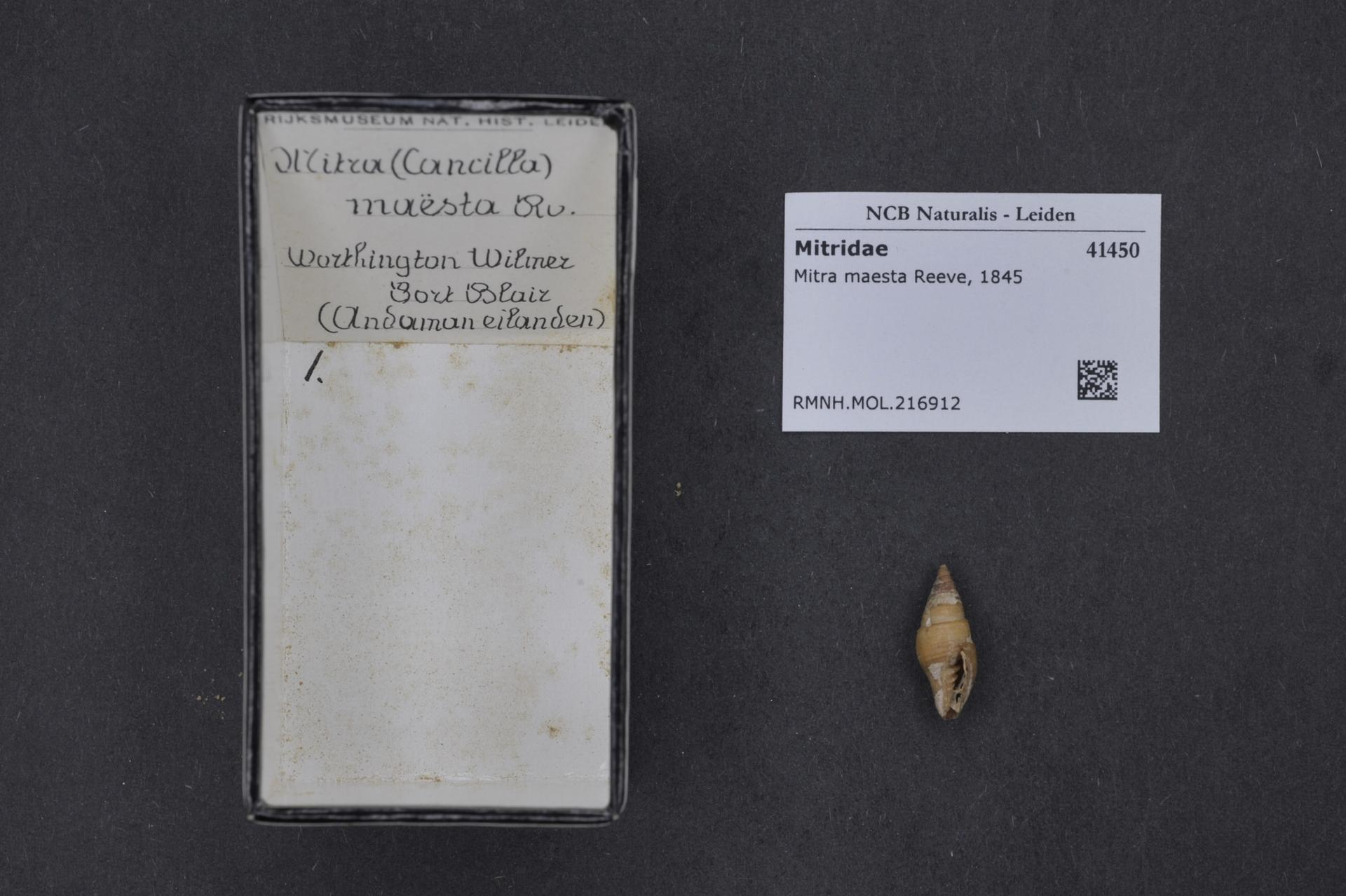

Scientific classification
- Kingdom: Animalia
- Phylum: Mollusca
- Class: Gastropoda
- Subclass: Caenogastropoda
- Order: Neogastropoda
- Family: Mitridae
- Genus: Pseudonebularia
- Species: P. maesta

Binomial name
- Pseudonebularia maesta (Reeve, 1845)

Synonyms
- Mitra maesta Reeve, 1845

= Pseudonebularia maesta =

Species of gastropod

Pseudonebularia maesta is a species of sea snail, a marine gastropod mollusk in the family Mitridae, the miters or miter snails.
