= Pseudonebularia lienardi =

Scientific classification
- Kingdom: Animalia
- Phylum: Mollusca
- Class: Gastropoda
- Subclass: Caenogastropoda
- Order: Neogastropoda
- Family: Mitridae
- Genus: Pseudonebularia
- Species: P. lienardi

Binomial name
- Pseudonebularia lienardi (G.B. Sowerby II, 1874)

Synonyms
- Mitra (Chrysame) lienardi G. B. Sowerby II, 1874; Mitra lienardi G.B. Sowerby II, 1874

Species of gastropod

Pseudonebularia lienardi is a species of sea snail, a marine gastropod mollusk in the family Mitridae, the miters or miter snails.

== Distribution ==
This species is occurs the Indian Ocean off the Mascarene Basin; also off New Caledonia.
