= Pseudonebularia tabanula =

Scientific classification
- Kingdom: Animalia
- Phylum: Mollusca
- Class: Gastropoda
- Subclass: Caenogastropoda
- Order: Neogastropoda
- Family: Mitridae
- Genus: Pseudonebularia
- Species: P. tabanula

Binomial name
- Pseudonebularia tabanula (Lamarck, 1811)

Synonyms
- Mitra tabanula Lamarck, 1811

Species of gastropod

Pseudonebularia tabanula is a species of sea snail, a marine gastropod mollusk in the family Mitridae, the miters or miter snails.
