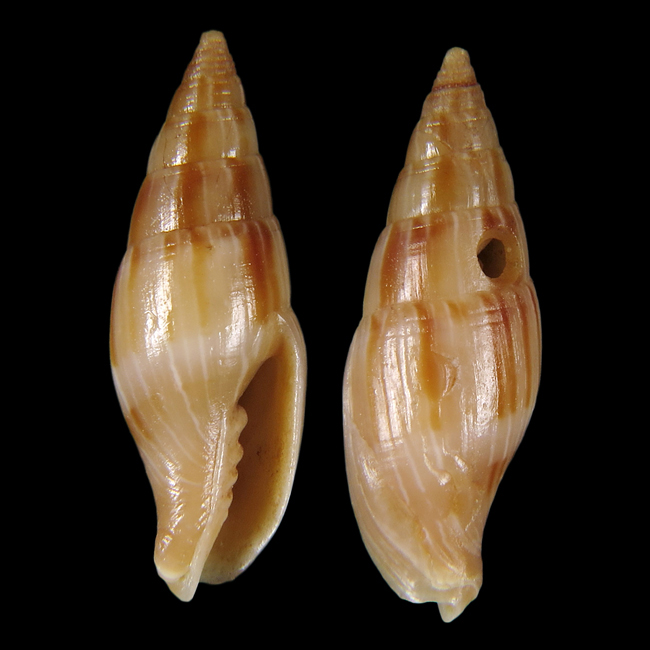

Scientific classification
- Kingdom: Animalia
- Phylum: Mollusca
- Class: Gastropoda
- Subclass: Caenogastropoda
- Order: Neogastropoda
- Family: Mitridae
- Genus: Acromargarita
- Species: A. semperi

Binomial name
- Acromargarita semperi (Poppe, Tagaro & Salisbury, 2009)

Synonyms
- Mitra semperi Poppe, Tagaro & Salisbury, 2009; Nebularia semperi (Poppe, Tagaro & R. Salisbury, 2009)

= Acromargarita semperi =

Species of gastropod

Acromargarita semperi is a species of sea snail, a marine gastropod mollusc in the family Mitridae, the miters or miter snails.

== Distribution ==
This marine species occurs off the Philippines.
