= Acromargarita cappuccino =

Scientific classification
- Kingdom: Animalia
- Phylum: Mollusca
- Class: Gastropoda
- Subclass: Caenogastropoda
- Order: Neogastropoda
- Family: Mitridae
- Subfamily: Mitrinae
- Genus: Acromargarita
- Species: A. cappuccino

Binomial name
- Acromargarita cappuccino S.-I Huang, 2021

Species of gastropod

Acromargarita cappuccino is a species of sea snail, a marine gastropod mollusk in the family Mitridae, the miters or miter snails.

== Distribution ==
This marine species occurs off the Philippines.
