= Pseudonebularia silviae =

Scientific classification
- Kingdom: Animalia
- Phylum: Mollusca
- Class: Gastropoda
- Subclass: Caenogastropoda
- Order: Neogastropoda
- Family: Mitridae
- Genus: Pseudonebularia
- Species: P. silviae

Binomial name
- Pseudonebularia silviae (Turner, 2007)

Synonyms
- Mitra silviae Turner, 2007

Species of gastropod

Pseudonebularia silviae is a species of sea snail, a marine gastropod mollusk in the family Mitridae, the miters or miter snails.
