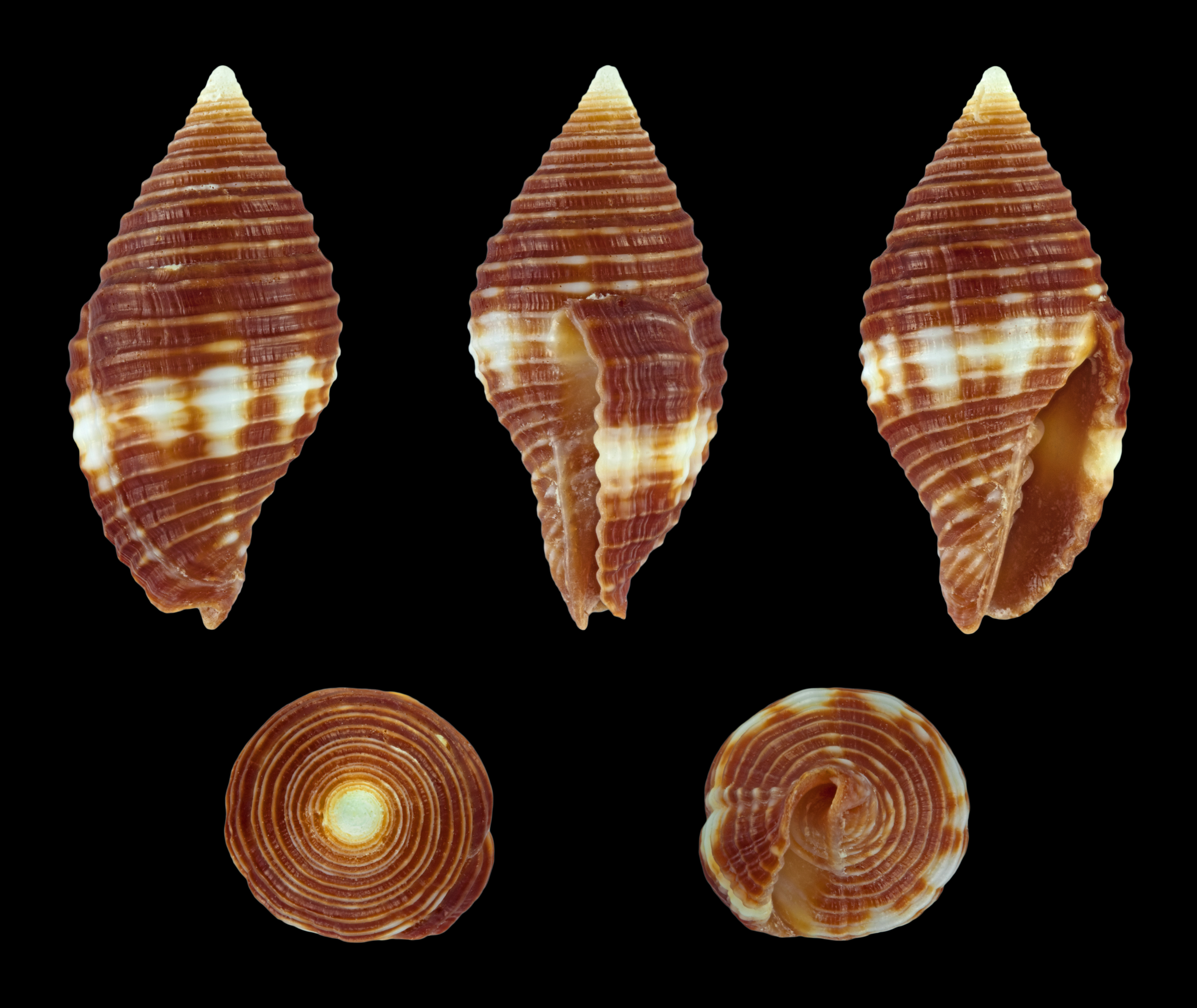

Scientific classification
- Kingdom: Animalia
- Phylum: Mollusca
- Class: Gastropoda
- Subclass: Caenogastropoda
- Order: Neogastropoda
- Family: Mitridae
- Genus: Pseudonebularia
- Species: P. cucumerina

Binomial name
- Pseudonebularia cucumerina (Lamarck, 1811)

Synonyms
- Mitra (Chrysame) cucumerina Lamarck, 1811; Mitra (Chrysame) cucumerina var. pallida Dautzenberg & Bouge, 1923 (invalid: junior homonym of Mitra pallida A. Adams, 1853); Mitra (Nebularia) cucumerina Lamarck, 1811; Mitra globosa Mörch, O.A.L., 1852; Mitra connectens Dautzenberg, Ph. & J.L. Bouge, 1923; Voluta ferrugata Dillwyn, L.W., 1817

= Pseudonebularia cucumerina =

Species of gastropod

Pseudonebularia cucumerina, common name : the kettle mitre, is a species of sea snail, a marine gastropod mollusk in the family Mitridae, the miters or miter snails.

== Description ==
The shell size varies between 9 mm and 35 mm.

== Distribution ==
This species occurs in the Red Sea and in the Indian Ocean off Aldabra, Chagos, Madagascar, Mauritius, and the Mascarene Basin; in the Pacific Ocean off Fiji, the Solomons Islands, the Philippines, Okinawa, Australia, Papua New Guinea.
