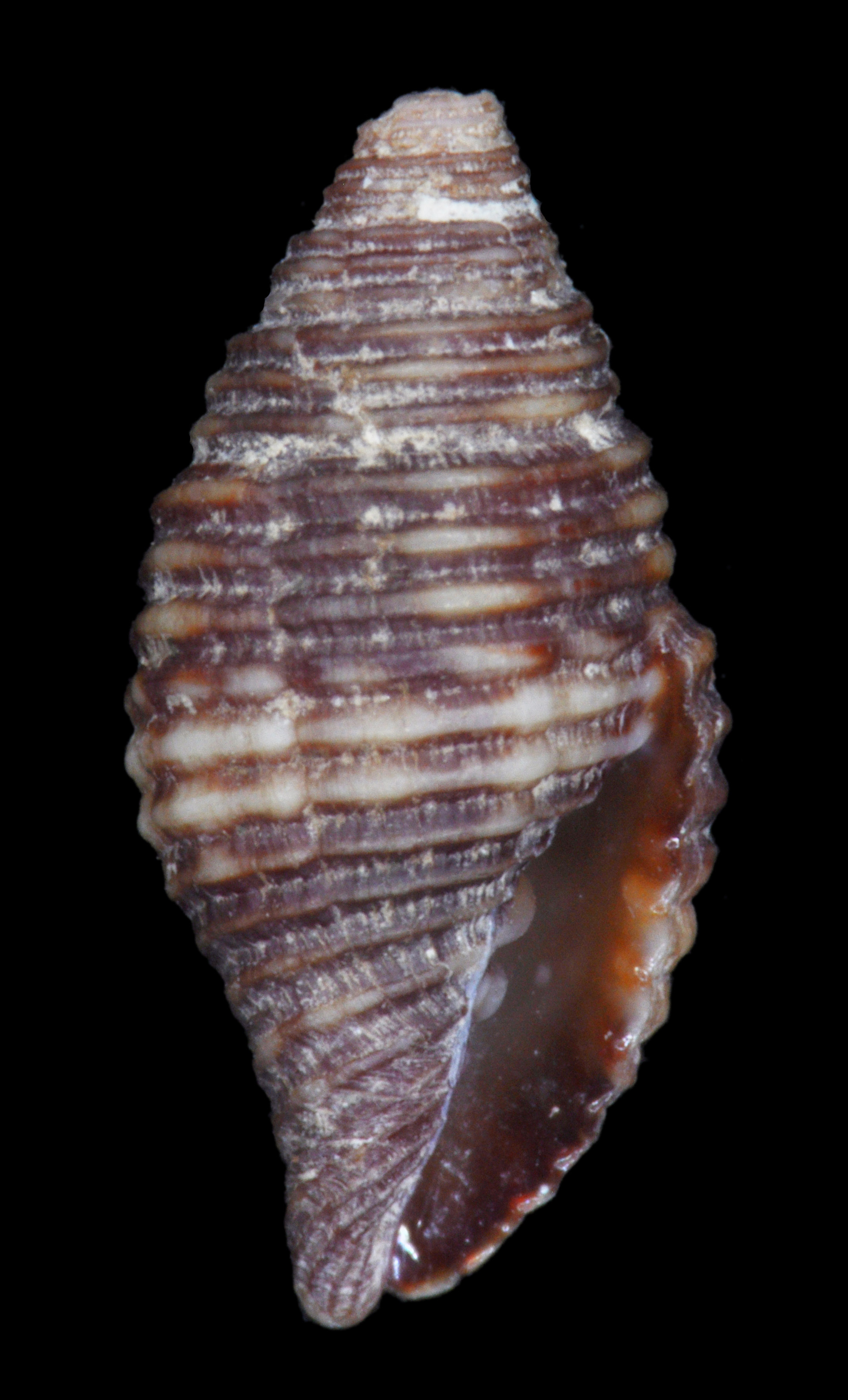
- Shell of Pseudonebularia connectens (specimen at MNHN, Paris)

Scientific classification
- Kingdom: Animalia
- Phylum: Mollusca
- Class: Gastropoda
- Subclass: Caenogastropoda
- Order: Neogastropoda
- Superfamily: Mitroidea
- Family: Mitridae
- Subfamily: Mitrinae
- Genus: Pseudonebularia
- Species: P. connectens

Binomial name
- Pseudonebularia connectens (Dautzenberg & Bouge, 1923)

Synonyms
- Mitra (Chrysame) tabanula var. connectens Dautzenberg & Bouge, 1923; Mitra (Nebularia) connectens Dautzenberg & Bouge, 1923; Mitra connectens Dautzenberg & Bouge, 1923

= Pseudonebularia connectens =

Species of gastropod

Pseudonebularia connectens is a species of sea snail, a marine gastropod mollusk, in the family Mitridae, the miters or miter snails.

== Distribution ==
This marine species occurs off Papua New Guinea.
