= Pseudonebularia semiferruginea =

Scientific classification
- Kingdom: Animalia
- Phylum: Mollusca
- Class: Gastropoda
- Subclass: Caenogastropoda
- Order: Neogastropoda
- Family: Mitridae
- Genus: Pseudonebularia
- Species: P. semiferruginea

Binomial name
- Pseudonebularia semiferruginea (Reeve, 1845)

Synonyms
- Mitra clara Sowerby II, 1874; Mitra fordi Pilsbry & McGinty, 1949; Mitra semiferruginea Reeve, 1845

Species of gastropod

Pseudonebularia semiferruginea is a species of sea snail, a marine gastropod mollusk in the family Mitridae, the miters or miter snails.

== Description ==
This species attains a size of 28 mm.

== Distribution ==
Western Atlantic: Bahamas.
