= Pseudonebularia rubritincta =

Scientific classification
- Kingdom: Animalia
- Phylum: Mollusca
- Class: Gastropoda
- Subclass: Caenogastropoda
- Order: Neogastropoda
- Family: Mitridae
- Genus: Pseudonebularia
- Species: P. rubritincta

Binomial name
- Pseudonebularia rubritincta (Reeve, 1844)

Synonyms
- Mitra rubritincta Reeve, 1844

Species of gastropod

Pseudonebularia rubritincta is a species of sea snail, a marine gastropod mollusk in the family Mitridae, the miters or miter snails.
