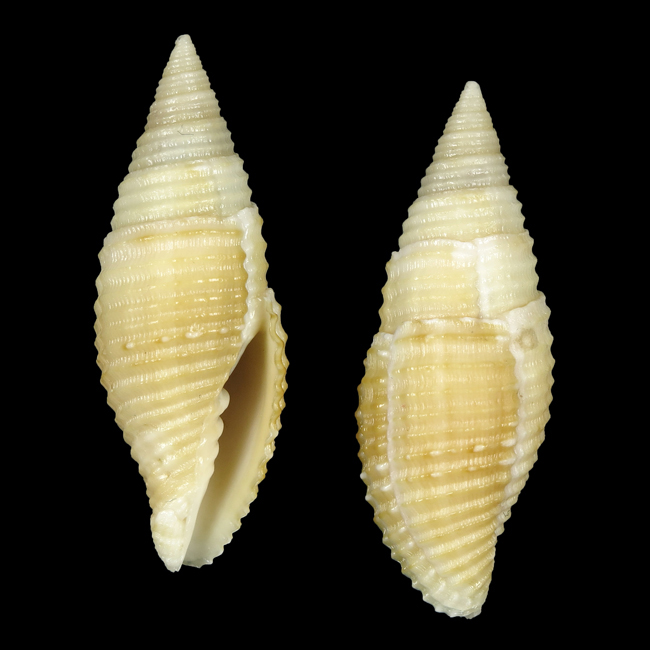

Scientific classification
- Kingdom: Animalia
- Phylum: Mollusca
- Class: Gastropoda
- Subclass: Caenogastropoda
- Order: Neogastropoda
- Family: Mitridae
- Genus: Pseudonebularia
- Species: P. willani

Binomial name
- Pseudonebularia willani (Poppe, Tagaro & Salisbury, 2009)

Synonyms
- Mitra willani Poppe, Tagaro & Salisbury, 2009

= Pseudonebularia willani =

Species of gastropod

Pseudonebularia willani is a species of rare, deep-water sea snail—a marine gastropod mollusk belonging to the miter snail family, Mitridae. It was originally described in 2009 by researchers Poppe, Tagaro, and Salisbury under the scientific name Mitra willani. Following a comprehensive molecular and morphological taxonomy update of the family Mitridae in 2018, the species was formally reassigned to its current genus, Pseudonebularia.

== Shell Morphology & Architecture ==
Pseudonebularia willani exhibits the classic, elegant structural features characteristic of the miter snail family, Mitridae. Its high-spired shell is distinctly fusiform and elongate, tapering smoothly toward both the apical tip (protoconch) and the anterior base. Adults of this relatively rare species are modest in size compared to larger family members, typically attaining a maximum shell length of 25 mm to 35 mm.

=== Sculpturing & Surface Texture ===
The exterior sculpture of the shell aligns closely with the defining characteristics of the genus Pseudonebularia:

- Spiral Cords & Grooves: The surface is ornamented with fine, evenly spaced spiral cords and shallow horizontal grooved lines (sulci) that encircle the whorls.
- Refined Relief: Unlike related gastropod groups (such as Costellariidae) that display prominent vertical axial ridges or ribbed patterns, P. willani maintains a smoother, more refined surface profile dominated by these subtle horizontal elements.
- Coloration: The shell background is typically off-white to cream, often accented with faint brownish or reddish-orange bands or blotches along the whorls.

=== Aperture & Internal Anatomy ===
Inside the shell, the long, narrow aperture occupies a significant portion of the total shell length and terminates in a well-defined siphonal notch at the anterior end, accommodating the siphon used for respiration and chemoreception.

Along the columella (the central axis or inner lip), the shell features 3 to 4 distinct spiral folds (columellar plaits). These anatomical features grow progressively stronger toward the posterior end and serve crucial functions:

1. Muscle Anchorage: Providing strong anchor points for the columellar muscle, allowing the animal to retract deep into the shell when threatened.
2. Structural Strength: Reinforcing the central pillar of the thin, narrow aperture.

As with other living species within the family Mitridae, the adult animal completely lacks an operculum (a protective "trapdoor"). Instead, it relies on its deep, narrow aperture, tight shell structure, and specialized muscular retraction for defense against predators.

== Distribution ==
Pseudonebularia willani is natively distributed in the tropical waters of the western Pacific Ocean, specifically off the archipelagic coastlines of the Philippines.

Because it is a benthic marine species, its distribution is closely tied to deeper offshore environments along the seafloor rather than shallow coastal reefs. Within these deep-water marine habitats, it shares its geographic range with various other specialized Indo-Pacific gastropods in the family Mitridae. However, due to the difficulty of sampling deep-water marine environments, its exact range boundaries and population density throughout the broader Indo-Pacific region remain sparsely documented.
