= Pseudonebularia cingulata =

Scientific classification
- Kingdom: Animalia
- Phylum: Mollusca
- Class: Gastropoda
- Subclass: Caenogastropoda
- Order: Neogastropoda
- Superfamily: Mitroidea
- Family: Mitridae
- Subfamily: Mitrinae
- Genus: Pseudonebularia
- Species: P. cingulata

Binomial name
- Pseudonebularia cingulata (A. Adams, 1853)

Synonyms
- Mitra cingulata A. Adams, 1853

Species of gastropod

Pseudonebularia cingulata is a species of sea snail, a marine gastropod mollusk, in the family Mitridae, the miters or miter snails.
