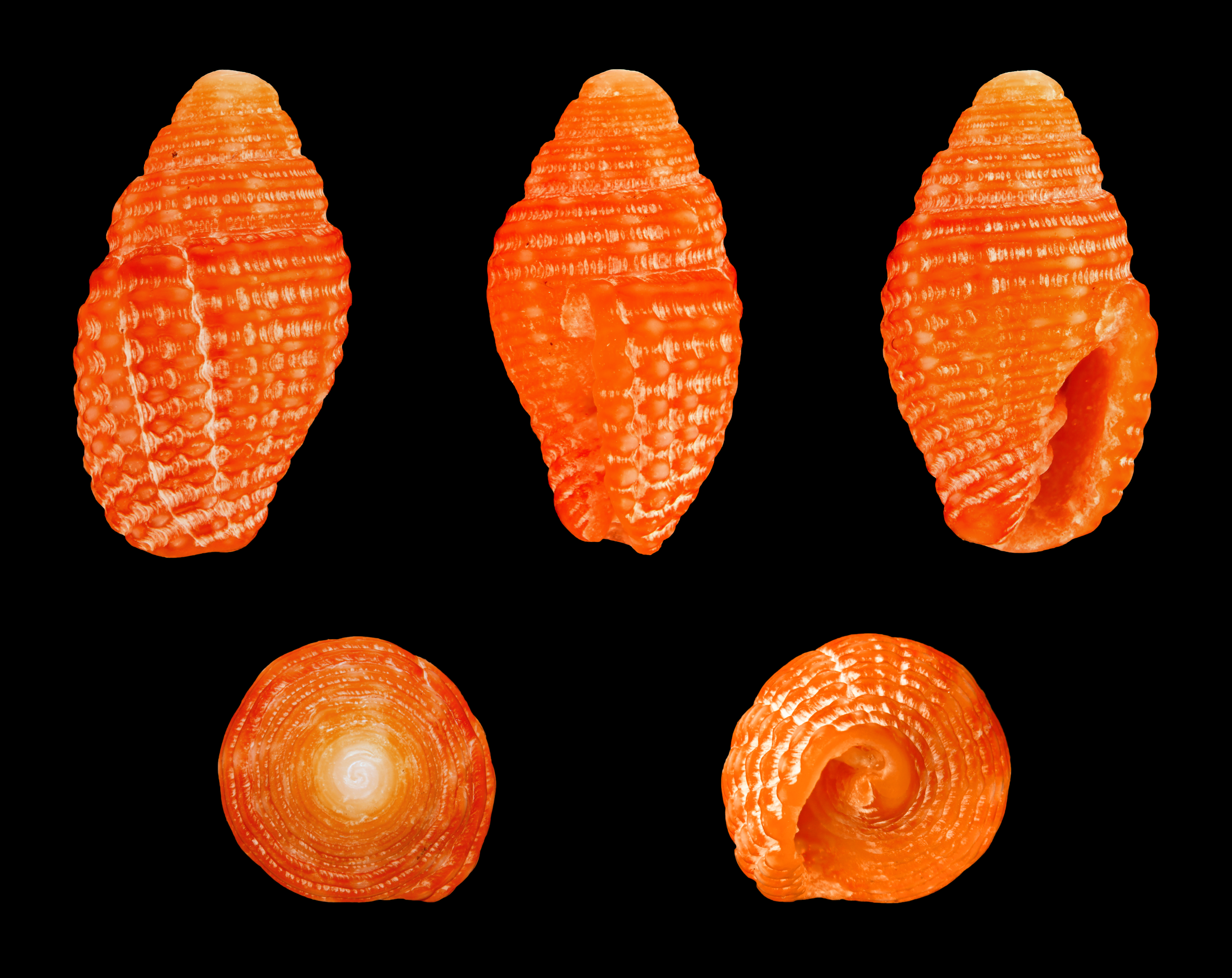

Scientific classification
- Kingdom: Animalia
- Phylum: Mollusca
- Class: Gastropoda
- Subclass: Caenogastropoda
- Order: Neogastropoda
- Family: Mitridae
- Genus: Pseudonebularia
- Species: P. chrysalis

Binomial name
- Pseudonebularia chrysalis (Reeve, 1844)

Synonyms
- Mitra chrysalis Reeve, 1844; Mitra caledonica Récluz, C., 1853; Mitra buryi Melvill, J.C. & E. R. Sykes, 1899; Strigatella buryi Melville & Sykes

= Pseudonebularia chrysalis =

Species of mollusc

Pseudonebularia chrysalis, common name the chrysalis mitre, is a species of sea snail, a marine gastropod mollusk in the family Mitridae, the miters or miter snails.

== Description ==
The shell size varies between 12 mm and 30 mm.

== Distribution ==
This species occurs in the Red Sea and in the Indian Ocean off Madagascar, the Mascarene basin and Tanzania; in the Pacific Ocean off the Philippines, Indonesia, Okinawa, Papua New Guinea, and Australia.
