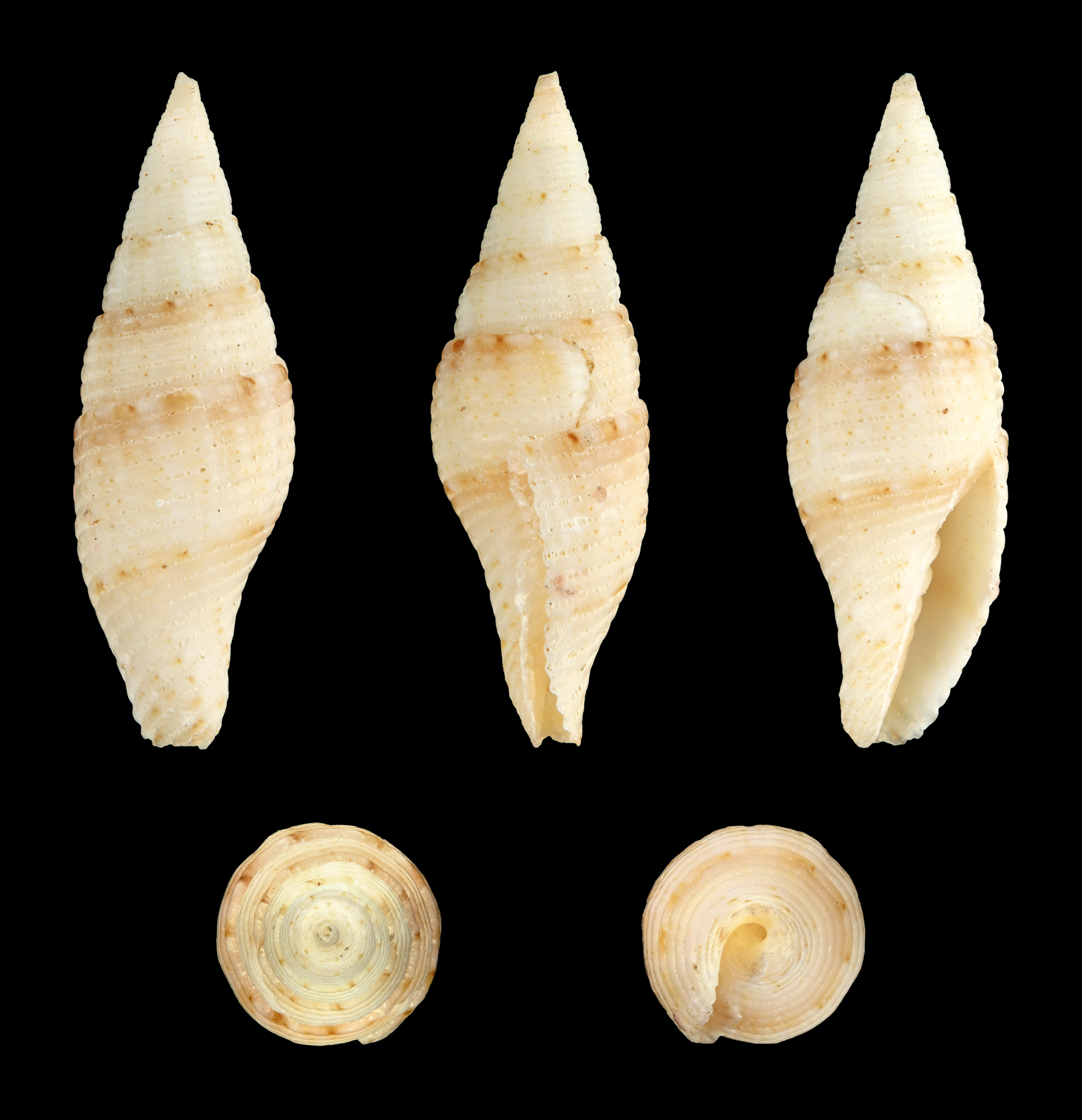

Scientific classification
- Kingdom: Animalia
- Phylum: Mollusca
- Class: Gastropoda
- Subclass: Caenogastropoda
- Order: Neogastropoda
- Family: Mitridae
- Genus: Pseudonebularia
- Species: P. perdulca

Binomial name
- Pseudonebularia perdulca (Poppe, Tagaro & Salisbury, 2009)

Synonyms
- Mitra perdulca Poppe, Tagaro & Salisbury, 2009

= Pseudonebularia perdulca =

Species of gastropod

Pseudonebularia perdulca is a species of sea snail, a marine gastropod mollusk in the family Mitridae, the miters or miter snails.

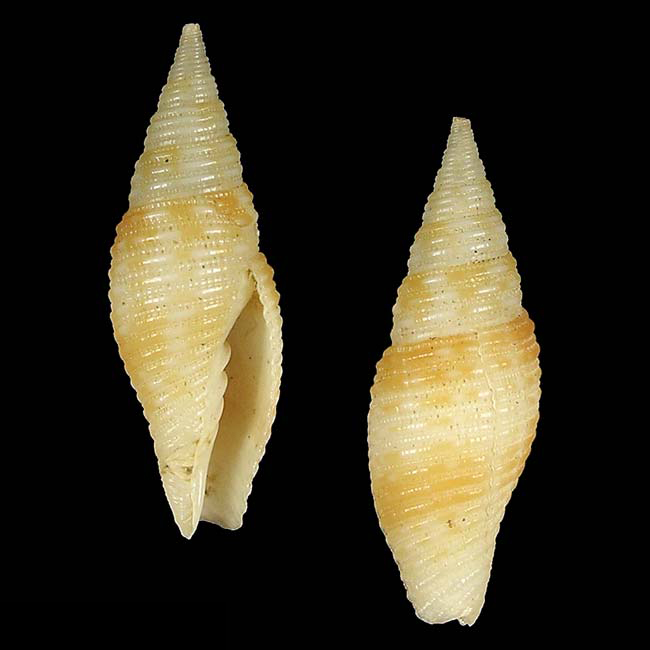
Seashell Pseudonebularia perdulca

== Distribution ==
This marine species occurs off the Philippines.
