= Pseudonebularia atjehensis =

Scientific classification
- Kingdom: Animalia
- Phylum: Mollusca
- Class: Gastropoda
- Subclass: Caenogastropoda
- Order: Neogastropoda
- Family: Mitridae
- Genus: Pseudonebularia
- Species: P. atjehensis

Binomial name
- Pseudonebularia atjehensis (Oostingh, 1939)

Synonyms
- Mitra atjehensis Oostingh, 1939

Species of gastropod

Pseudonebularia atjehensis is a species of sea snail, a marine gastropod mollusk in the family Mitridae, the miters or miter snails.
