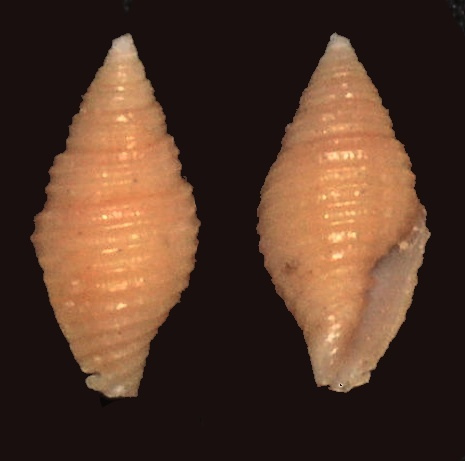

Scientific classification
- Kingdom: Animalia
- Phylum: Mollusca
- Class: Gastropoda
- Subclass: Caenogastropoda
- Order: Neogastropoda
- Family: Mitridae
- Genus: Pseudonebularia
- Species: P. doliolum

Binomial name
- Pseudonebularia doliolum (Küster, 1839)

Synonyms
- Mitra (Nebularia) doliolum Küster, 1839; Mitra doliolum Küster, 1839

= Pseudonebularia doliolum =

Species of gastropod

Pseudonebularia doliolum is a species of sea snail, a marine gastropod mollusk in the family Mitridae, the miters or miter snails.

== Description ==
The shell size varies between 17 mm and 30 mm.

== Distribution ==
This species is distributed in the Indo-West Pacific, along Fiji, the Solomon Islands, and New Guinea.
