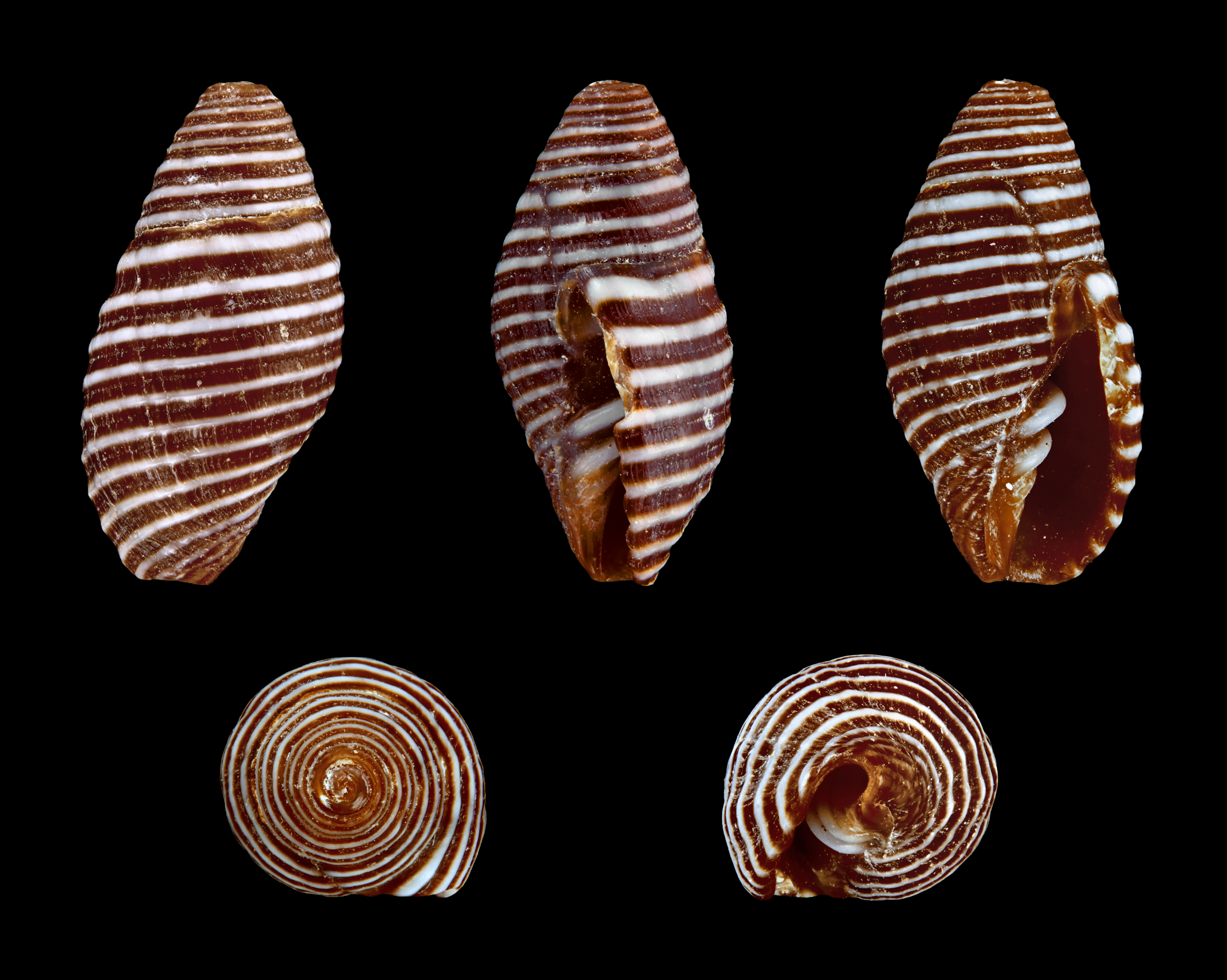
- Pseudonebularia pediculus

Scientific classification
- Kingdom: Animalia
- Phylum: Mollusca
- Class: Gastropoda
- Subclass: Caenogastropoda
- Order: Neogastropoda
- Superfamily: Mitroidea
- Family: Mitridae
- Subfamily: Mitrinae
- Genus: Pseudonebularia
- Species: P. pediculus

Binomial name
- Pseudonebularia pediculus (Lamarck, 1811)

Synonyms
- Mitra pediculus Lamarck, 1811

= Pseudonebularia pediculus =

Species of gastropod

Pseudonebularia pediculus is a species of sea snail, a marine gastropod mollusk, in the family Mitridae, the miters or miter snails.

== Distribution ==
This marine species occurs off Papua New Guinea.
