= Pseudonebularia indentata =

Scientific classification
- Kingdom: Animalia
- Phylum: Mollusca
- Class: Gastropoda
- Subclass: Caenogastropoda
- Order: Neogastropoda
- Superfamily: Mitroidea
- Family: Mitridae
- Subfamily: Mitrinae
- Genus: Pseudonebularia
- Species: P. indentata

Binomial name
- Pseudonebularia indentata (G. B. Sowerby II, 1874)

Synonyms
- Mitra indentata G. B. Sowerby II, 1874

Species of gastropod

Pseudonebularia indentata is a species of sea snail, a marine gastropod mollusk, in the family Mitridae, the miters or miter snails.

== Description ==
The shell is whitish. It is spirally few-ridged. The aperture is narrow and longer than spire. The outer lip is contracted in the middle, strongly crenulated, rather acuminated anteriorly.
