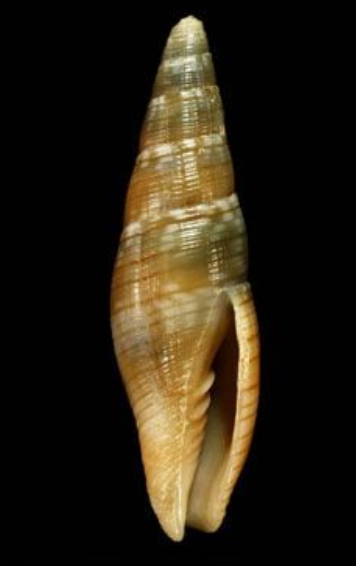
- Shell of Acromargarita deynzeri (specimen at the Natural History Museum, Rotterdam)

Scientific classification
- Kingdom: Animalia
- Phylum: Mollusca
- Class: Gastropoda
- Subclass: Caenogastropoda
- Order: Neogastropoda
- Family: Mitridae
- Genus: Acromargarita
- Species: A. deynzeri

Binomial name
- Acromargarita deynzeri (Cernohorsky, 1980)

Synonyms
- Gemmulimitra edgari (Poppe, Tagaro & R. Salisbury, 2009); Mitra (Mitra) deynzeri Cernohorsky, 1980; Mitra deynzeri Cernohorsky, 1980; Mitra edgari Poppe, Tagaro & R. Salisbury, 2009; Nebularia deynzeri (Cernohorsky, 1980)

= Acromargarita deynzeri =

Species of gastropod

Acromargarita deynzeri is a species of sea snail, a marine gastropod mollusc in the family Mitridae, the miters or miter snails.

== Description ==
The length of the shell attains 20 mm.

.

== Distribution ==
This marine species occurs off the Philippines and Okinawa Island
