= Pseudonebularia tornata =

Scientific classification
- Kingdom: Animalia
- Phylum: Mollusca
- Class: Gastropoda
- Subclass: Caenogastropoda
- Order: Neogastropoda
- Superfamily: Mitroidea
- Family: Mitridae
- Subfamily: Mitrinae
- Genus: Pseudonebularia
- Species: P. tornata

Binomial name
- Pseudonebularia tornata (Reeve, 1845)

Synonyms
- Mitra tornata Reeve, 1845

Species of gastropod

Pseudonebularia tornata is a species of sea snail, a marine gastropod mollusk, in the family Mitridae, the miters or miter snails.

== Distribution ==
This species occurs in Papua New Guinea.
