= Pseudonebularia dovpeledi =

Scientific classification
- Kingdom: Animalia
- Phylum: Mollusca
- Class: Gastropoda
- Subclass: Caenogastropoda
- Order: Neogastropoda
- Family: Mitridae
- Genus: Pseudonebularia
- Species: P. dovpeledi

Binomial name
- Pseudonebularia dovpeledi (Turner, 1997)

Synonyms
- Mitra dovpeledi Turner, 1997

Species of gastropod

Pseudonebularia dovpeledi is a species of sea snail, a marine gastropod mollusk in the family Mitridae, the miters or miter snails.

== Description ==
Pseudonebularia dovpeledi has the following physical characteristics: it is a sea snail. The shell has a well-developed siphonal canal. The siphon is an elongated and trunk like extensible tube formed from a fold in the mantle, and is used to suck water into the mantle cavity. There is a bipectinate osphradium located at base of siphon and branches off from a central axis. There is an olfactory organ located at the base of the siphon. There is a heart with a single auricle, a single pair a gill leaflets on one side of the central axis and 1 kidney.
