= Pseudonebularia rueppellii =

Scientific classification
- Kingdom: Animalia
- Phylum: Mollusca
- Class: Gastropoda
- Subclass: Caenogastropoda
- Order: Neogastropoda
- Family: Mitridae
- Genus: Pseudonebularia
- Species: P. rueppellii

Binomial name
- Pseudonebularia rueppellii (Reeve, 1844)

Synonyms
- Mitra rueppellii Reeve, 1844

Species of gastropod

Pseudonebularia rueppellii is a species of sea snail, a marine gastropod mollusk in the family Mitridae, the miters or miter snails. It has a usually brown and/or white shell. The shell has swirls that come up to make a pointed/cone shape for the shell.
