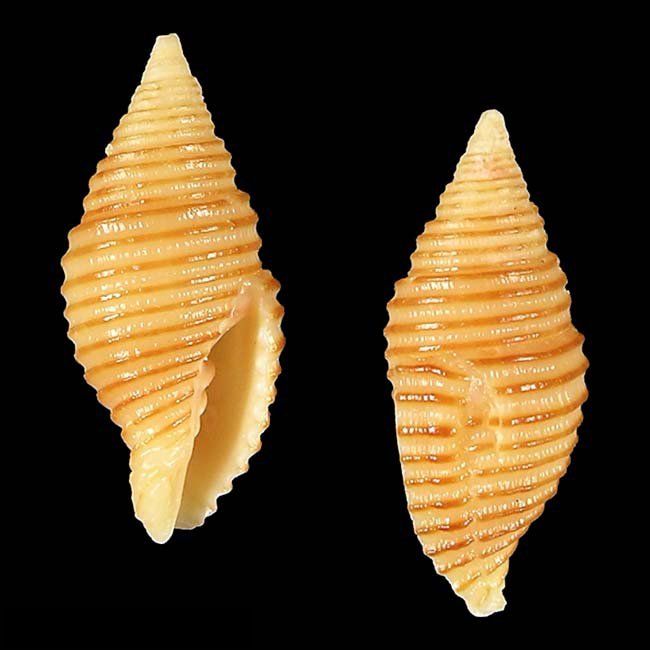

Scientific classification
- Kingdom: Animalia
- Phylum: Mollusca
- Class: Gastropoda
- Subclass: Caenogastropoda
- Order: Neogastropoda
- Family: Mitridae
- Genus: Pseudonebularia
- Species: P. wareni

Binomial name
- Pseudonebularia wareni (Poppe, Tagaro & Salisbury, 2009)

Synonyms
- Mitra wareni Poppe, Tagaro & Salisbury, 2009

= Pseudonebularia wareni =

Species of gastropod

Pseudonebularia wareni is a species of sea snail, a marine gastropod mollusk in the family Mitridae, the miters or miter snails.

== Distribution ==
This marine species occurs off the Philippines.
