= Pseudonebularia proscissa =

Scientific classification
- Kingdom: Animalia
- Phylum: Mollusca
- Class: Gastropoda
- Subclass: Caenogastropoda
- Order: Neogastropoda
- Family: Mitridae
- Genus: Pseudonebularia
- Species: P. proscissa

Binomial name
- Pseudonebularia proscissa (Reeve, 1844)

Synonyms
- Mitra proscissa Reeve, 1844

Species of gastropod

Pseudonebularia proscissa is a species of sea snail, a marine gastropod mollusk in the family Mitridae, the miters or miter snails.

== Distribution ==
It is found in the Indian Ocean and west Pacific Ocean.
