= Acromargarita spes =

Scientific classification
- Kingdom: Animalia
- Phylum: Mollusca
- Class: Gastropoda
- Subclass: Caenogastropoda
- Order: Neogastropoda
- Family: Mitridae
- Genus: Acromargarita
- Species: A. spes

Binomial name
- Acromargarita spes S.-I Huang, 2023

Species of gastropod

Acromargarita spes is a species of sea snail, a marine gastropod mollusc in the family Mitridae, the miters or miter snails.

== Distribution ==
This marine species occurs off Taiwan.
