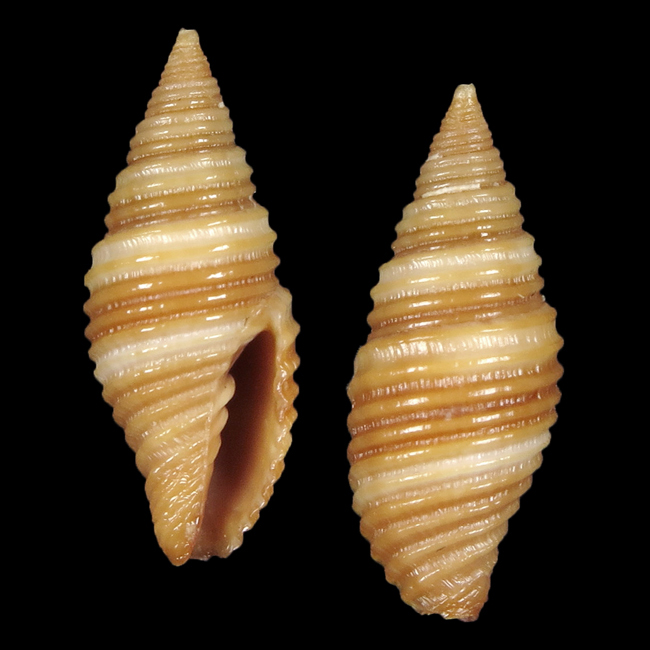

Scientific classification
- Kingdom: Animalia
- Phylum: Mollusca
- Class: Gastropoda
- Subclass: Caenogastropoda
- Order: Neogastropoda
- Family: Mitridae
- Genus: Pseudonebularia
- Species: P. sarinoae

Binomial name
- Pseudonebularia sarinoae (Poppe, 2008)

Synonyms
- Mitra sarinoae Poppe, 2008

= Pseudonebularia sarinoae =

Species of gastropod

Pseudonebularia sarinoae is a species of sea snail, a marine gastropod mollusk in the family Mitridae, the miters or miter snails.

== Description ==
The length of the shell attains 8.9 mm.

== Distribution ==
This marine species occurs off the Philippines.
