= Acromargarita mackayorum =

Scientific classification
- Kingdom: Animalia
- Phylum: Mollusca
- Class: Gastropoda
- Subclass: Caenogastropoda
- Order: Neogastropoda
- Family: Mitridae
- Subfamily: Mitrinae
- Genus: Acromargarita
- Species: A. mackayorum

Binomial name
- Acromargarita mackayorum (S.-I Huang & Q.-Y. Chuo, 2019)

Synonyms
- Nebularia mackayorum S.-I Huang & Q.-Y. Chuo, 2019 superseded combination

Species of gastropod

Acromargarita mackayorum is a species of sea snail, a marine gastropod mollusk in the family Mitridae, the miters or miter snails.

== Distribution ==
This marine species occurs off the Philippines and New Caledonia.
