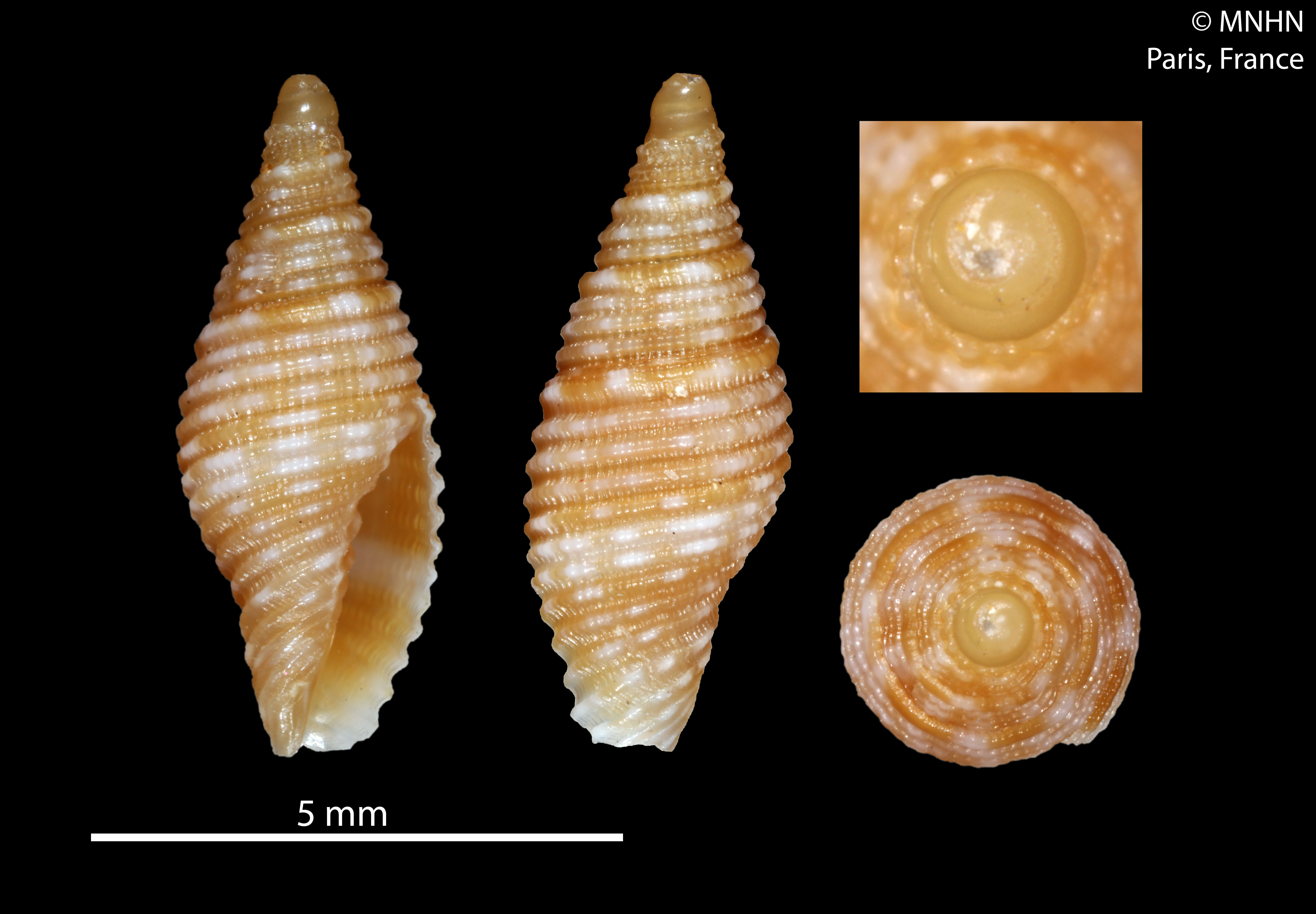
- Shell of Acromargarita oliverai (paratype at MNHN, Paris)

Scientific classification
- Kingdom: Animalia
- Phylum: Mollusca
- Class: Gastropoda
- Subclass: Caenogastropoda
- Order: Neogastropoda
- Family: Mitridae
- Genus: Acromargarita
- Species: A. oliverai

Binomial name
- Acromargarita oliverai (Poppe, 2008)

Synonyms
- Mitra oliverai Poppe, 2008; Pseudonebularia oliverai (Poppe, 2008)

= Acromargarita oliverai =

Species of gastropod

Acromargarita oliverai is a species of sea snail, a marine gastropod mollusk in the family Mitridae, the miters or miter snails.

== Distribution ==
This marine species occurs off the Philippines.
