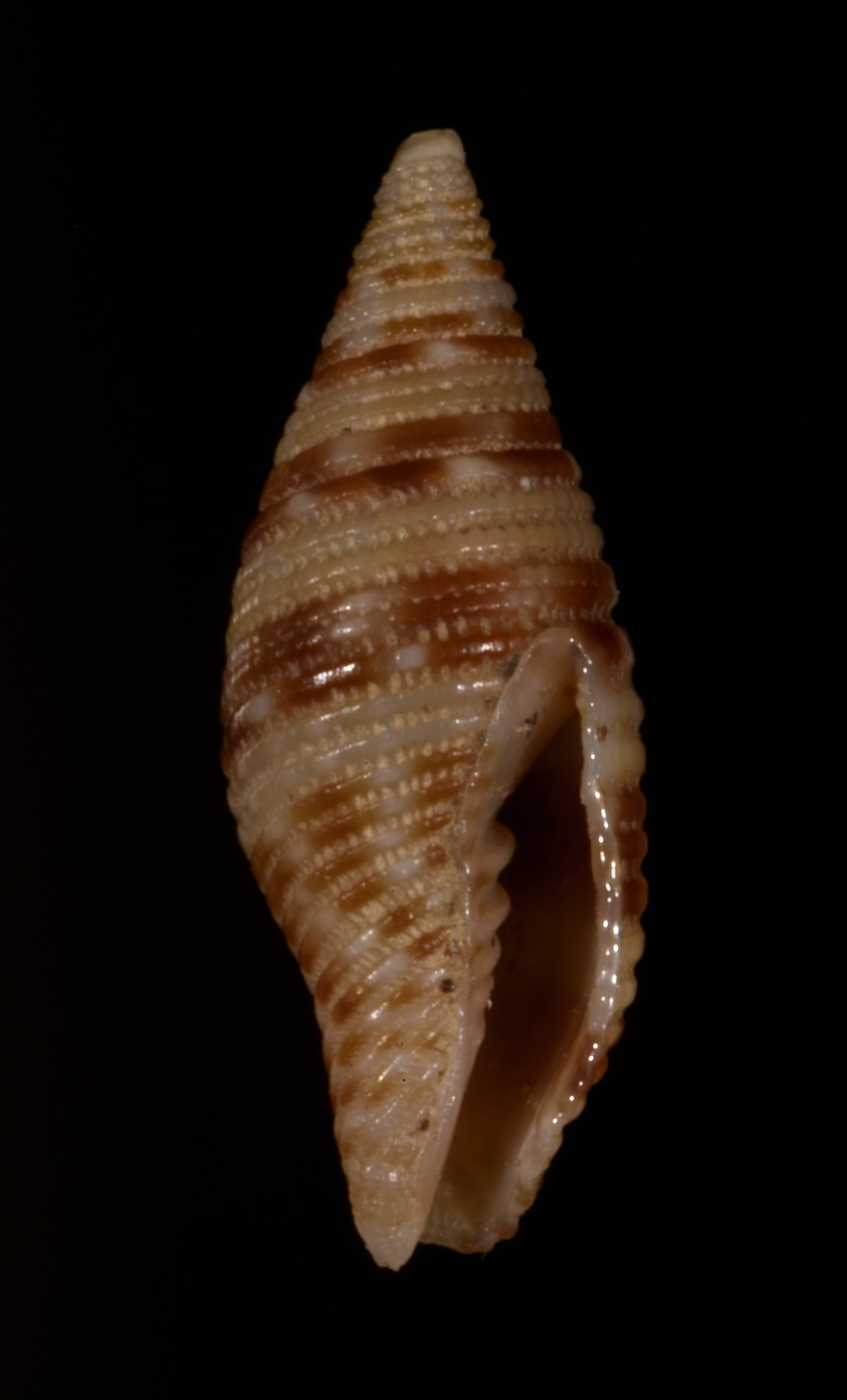
- Shell of Acromargarita kilburni (specimen at MNHN, Paris)

Scientific classification
- Kingdom: Animalia
- Phylum: Mollusca
- Class: Gastropoda
- Subclass: Caenogastropoda
- Order: Neogastropoda
- Family: Mitridae
- Genus: Acromargarita
- Species: A. kilburni

Binomial name
- Acromargarita kilburni (Poppe, Tagaro & Salisbury, 2009)

Synonyms
- Mitra (Neocancilla) kilburni Poppe, Tagaro & R. Salisbury, 2009; Mitra kilburni Poppe, Tagaro & Salisbury, 2009; Pseudonebularia kilburni (Poppe, Tagaro & R. Salisbury, 2009)

= Acromargarita kilburni =

Species of gastropod

Acromargarita kilburni is a species of sea snail, a marine gastropod mollusk in the family Mitridae, the miters or miter snails.

== Distribution ==
This marine species occurs off the Philippines.
