= Acromargarita yayanae =

Scientific classification
- Kingdom: Animalia
- Phylum: Mollusca
- Class: Gastropoda
- Subclass: Caenogastropoda
- Order: Neogastropoda
- Superfamily: Mitroidea
- Family: Mitridae
- Subfamily: Mitrinae
- Genus: Acromargarita
- Species: A. yayanae

Binomial name
- Acromargarita yayanae (Huang, 2011)

Synonyms
- Mitra (Nebularia) yayanae Huang, 2011; Mitra yayanae Huang, 2011; Pseudonebularia yayanae (S.-I Huang, 2011)

Species of gastropod

Acromargarita yayanae is a species of sea snail, a marine gastropod mollusk, in the family Mitridae, the miters or miter snails.
