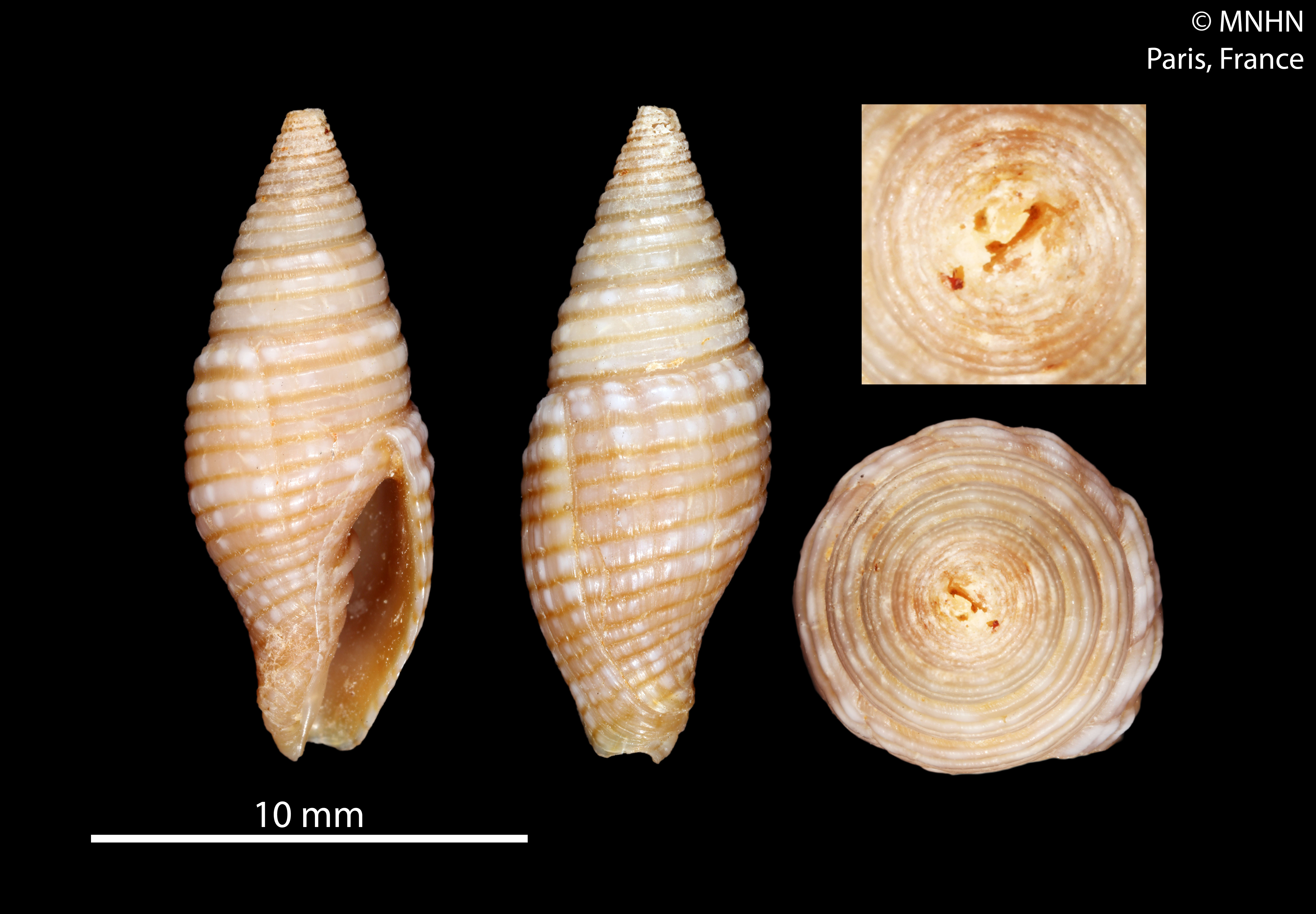
- Shell of Acromargarita cuyosae (paratype at MNHN, Paris)

Scientific classification
- Kingdom: Animalia
- Phylum: Mollusca
- Class: Gastropoda
- Subclass: Caenogastropoda
- Order: Neogastropoda
- Family: Mitridae
- Genus: Acromargarita
- Species: A. cuyosae

Binomial name
- Acromargarita cuyosae (Poppe, 2008)

Synonyms
- Mitra cuyosae Poppe, 2008; Pseudonebularia cuyosae (Poppe, 2008)

= Acromargarita cuyosae =

Species of gastropod

Acromargarita cuyosae is a species of sea snail, a marine gastropod mollusk in the family Mitridae, the miters or miter snails.

== Description ==
The length of the shell attains 5.8 mm.

== Distribution ==
This marine species occurs off the Philippines.
